= Presidents of the Hunterian Society =

Chairs of a medical society

This is a list of presidents of the Hunterian Society, founded in London in 1819 in honour of the surgeon and anatomist John Hunter. Between 1940 and 1945 there was no president. Several were based at St Thomas' Hospital, Guy's Hospital, and the London Hospital. Thirty-six of the society's first 48 presidents delivered the Hunterian Society Oration.

== 1819 - 1840 ==
Nº	Portrait	Name (Birth–Death)	Term	Oration/notes	Base
1		Sir William Blizard (1743 – 1835)	1819 – 1822	Founding member Having been a pupil of Hunter, he suggested the title of the "Hunterian Society" rather than the initially proposed "London and Medical Physical"; Elected president for three consecutive years	London Hospital
2		Benjamin Robinson (d. 1828)	1822 – 1824	During his presidency, the annual dinner was established, combined with the annual report and oration. Formerly, he had been the society's first treasurer. In the year before becoming president, he noted that percussion of the chest could be used to detect diseases of the lung. Died a fortnight after he delivered the Hunterian oration in 1828.	London Hospital
3		William Babington (1756 – 1833)	1824 – 1826	Founding member. Elected president for three consecutive years	Guy's Hospital
4		Sir Benjamin Travers (1783 – 1858)	1826 – 1828	Simultaneously served as president of the Royal Medical and Chirurgical Society of London, and delivered the society's Hunterian oration 1837.	St Thomas' Hospital
5		Archibald Billing (1791 – 1881)	1828 – 1830	Joined the Society in 1822. "An essay on auscultation of the heart" (1932)	London Hospital
6		Thomas Callaway (1791 – 1848)	1830 – 1832	A former apprentice to Astley Cooper, Callaway delivered the society's oration to a large audience including Sir Robert Peel, nine days after Coopers death.	Guy's Hospital
7		Charles Aston Key (1793 – 1849)	1832 – 1834	Key had shared his knowledge of a disorder of heart valves with his colleague Thomas Hodgkin, who subsequently gave the first accurate description of what became known as aortic insufficiency; In 1827 and 1829, Hodgkin read out his letters to the Society on what he called "retroversion of the valves of the aorta".	Guy's Hospital
8		Benjamin Guy Babington (1794 – 1866)	1834 – 1836	The son of William Babington, a former Hunterian Society president, he served in the Indian Civil Service prior to returning to England to study medicine. 26 years before Manuel García, Babington described to the society a mirror to inspect the throat.	Guy's Hospital
9		Bransby Blake Cooper (1792 – 1853)	1836 – 1838	Nephew of Astley Cooper.	Guy's Hospital
10		John Whiting (d. 1863)	1838 – 1838		
11		John Scott	1839 – 1841		

== 1841 - 1851 ==
Nº	Portrait	Name (Birth–Death)	Term	Oration/notes	Base
12		William Cooke (1785 – 1873)	1841 – 1843	Having co-founded the society, he retained position as its secretary for 20 years.	St Bartholomew's Hospital
13		James Luke	1843 – 1845	Joined the society in 1827; Upon the death of William Blizard, was appointed a principal surgeon at the London Hospital.	London Hospital
14		Richard Bright	1845 – 1847	15 Years before elected president, he had address the society on the topic of puerperal inflammation.	
15		Gilbert Wakefield Macmurdo	1847 – 1848		
16		Francis Henry Ramsbotham	1848 – 1849		
17		Edward Cock	1849 – 1850		
18		Henry Marshall Hughes (1805 – 1858)	1850 – 1851	Studied under Astley Cooper, Richard Bright, and Thomas Addison, and later took over as full physician upon Babington's retirement.	Guy's Hospital

== 1851 - 1863 ==
Nº	Portrait	Name (Birth–Death)	Term	Oration/notes	Base
19		John Adams	1851 – 1852	At the society's centenary in 1919, he was awarded a silver medal for his work on congenital syphilis.	
20		Henry Greenwood	1852 – 1853		
21		John Hilton	1853 – 1854		
22		John Charles Weaver Leve	1854 – 1855		
23		Thomas Blizard Curling	1855 – 1856	In 1848 he had addressed the society with "The Advantages of Ether and Chloroform in Operative Surgery", he argued that surgical pain was unequivocally "an evil" dismissing the idea that endurance of suffering reflected moral courage, and that examples of those who perversely relished suffering demonstrated that pain itself possessed no moral virtue.	
24		George Hilary Barlow	1856 – 1857		
25		Samuel Solly	1857 – 1858		
26		William James Little	1858 – 1859		
27		D. Henry Walne	1859 – 1860		
28		Sir James Risdon Bennett	1860 – 1861		
29		George Critchett	1861 – 1863		

== 1863 - 1872 ==
Nº	Portrait	Name (Birth–Death)	Term	Oration/notes	Base
30		Thomas Mee Dalby	1863 – 1865		
31		Alfred Smee	1865 – 1866		
32		Stephen Henry Ward	1866 – 1867		
33		John Jackson	1867 – 1868		
34		Thomas Bevill Peacock	1868 – 1869		
35		Jonathan Hutchinson	1869 – 1870		
36		Dennis De Berdt Hovell	1871 – 1872		"The power above matter"

== 1872 - 1895 ==
Nº	Portrait	Name (Birth–Death)	Term	Oration/notes	Base
37		Herbert Davies	1872 – 1873		
38		Thomas Bryant	1873 – 1874		
39		Robert Barnes	1874 – 1875		
40		William Sedwick Saunders	1875 – 1876		
41		Henry Isaac Fotherby	1876 – 1877	Joined the Society in 1854, became its secretary in 1857, and delivered the oration in 1969 on "The Rise, Progress, and Influence of the Society". Treasurer between 1872-1887.	
42		Arthur Edward Durham	1877 – 1878		
43		Sir Thomas Boor Crosby	1878 – 1879		
44		John Braxton Hicks	1879 – 1880		
45		John Couper	1880 – 1881		
46		Peter Lodwick Burchill	1881 – 1882		
47		John Hughlings Jackson	1882 – 1883		
48		Walter Rivington (1835 – 1897)	1883 – 1885	Related to Sir William Blizard, Rivington had also previously delivered the society's oration.	
49		Philip Pye-Smith	1885 – 1886		
50		Francis Mead Corner	1866 – 1887		
51		Henry Gervis	1887 – 1888		
52		Richard Clement Lucas	1888 – 1890		
53		Stephen Mackenzie	1890 – 1892		
54		Frederick Gordon Brown	1892 – 1894		
55		Charters James Symonds	1894 – 1896		

== 1896 - 1908 ==
Nº	Portrait	Name (Birth–Death)	Term	Oration/notes	Base
56		George Ernest Herman	1896 – 1898		
57		John Sell Edmund Cotman	1898 – 1900		
58		James Dundas-Grant	1900 – 1903		
59		Alfred Lewis Galabin	1902 – 1904		
60		Stephen Herbert Appleford	1903 – 1904		
61		Frederick John Smith	1904 – 1906		
62		John Poland	1906 – 1907		
63		Francis Rowland Humphris	1907 – 1908		

== 1908 - 1915 ==
Nº	Portrait	Name (Birth–Death)	Term	Oration/notes	Base
64		Arthur Templer Davies	1908 – 1909		
65		Thomas Horrocks Openshaw	1909 – 1910		
66		John Adams	1910 – 1911		
67		Richard Hingston Fox	1911 – 1912		
68		Alfred Herbert Tubby	1912 – 1913		
69		William J. McCulloch Ettles	1913 – 1914		
70		Thomas Glover Lyon	1914 – 1915		

== 1915 - 1930 ==
Nº	Portrait	Name (Birth–Death)	Term	Oration/notes	Base
71		William Henry Kelson (1862 – 1940)	1915 – 1916		
72		A.S. Currie	1916 – 1917		
73		Hugh Lett (1876 – 1964)	1917 – 1918		
74		W. Langdon Brown	1918 – 1920		
75		A.C. Jordan	11920 – 1921		
76		Russell Howard	1921 – 1922		
77		R. Fortescue Fox	1922 – 1923		
78		Sir Bruce Bruce-Porter	1923 – 1924		
79		H.W. Carson	1924 – 1925		
80		F. Howard Humphris	1925 – 1926		
81		Albert Edward Mortimer Woolf	1926 – 1925		
82		Arthur Westerman (1878 – 1963)	1925 – 1928	Joined the society in 1909.	St Bartholomew's Hospital
83		Ernest Young	1929 – 1930		

== 1931 - 1940 ==
Nº	Portrait	Name (Birth–Death)	Term	Oration/notes	Base
84		A.W. Sheen	1930 – 1931		
85		David Ross	1931 – 1932		
86		Nathan Raw	1932 – 1933		
87		W.E. Tanner	1933 – 1934		
88		W. H. F. Oxley	1934 – 1935		
89		W. Brander	1935 – 1936		
90		H. L. Attwater	1936 – 1937		
91		D.C. Norris	1937 – 1938		
92		Andrew McAllister	1938 – 1939		
93		John Eyre	1939 – 1940		

== 1945 - 1960 ==
94	Albert Edward Mortimer Woolf	1945 – 1946	
95	J. Basil Cook	1946 – 1947	
96	Alexander Ernest Roche	1947 – 1948	
97	G.R. Mather Cordiner	1948 – 1949	"The role of radiology in the peptic ulcer problem"
98	W. Thompson Brown	1949 – 1950	
99	Arthur Porritt, Baron Porritt	1950 – 1952	
100	Basil T. Parsons-Smith	1952 – 1953	
101	William Heneage Ogilvie (1887 – 1971)	1953 – 1954	
102	W.S.C. Copeman	1954 – 1955	
103	A. Dickson Wright	1955 – 1956	
104	Cecil D. Coyle	1956 – 1957	
105	John Ainsworth-Davis	1957 – 1958	
106	Francis Leslie	1958 – 1959	
107	Alec W. Badenoch	1959 – 1960	

== 1960 - 1970 ==
108	Gordon B. Mitchell-Heggs	1960 – 1961
109	Sir Cecil Wakeley	1961 – 1962
110	John Henderson Hunt	1962 – 1963
111	A. Lawrence Abel	1963 – 1964
112	W. Gordon Sears	1964 – 1965
113	N. Asherson	1965 – 1966
114	George Qvist	1966 – 1967
115	Clement C. Chesterman	1967 – 1968
116	Sir Eric Riches	1968 – 1969
117	C.W. Kesson	1969 – 1970

== 1970 - 1985 ==
118	Reginald S. Murley	1970 – 1971	
119	Fred Wrigley	1971 – 1972	Introduced to the society by William Copeman, his presidential address was title "Mankind is Man" (146th session)
120	Thomas Vangh Lee Crichow (1901-1988)	1972 – 1973	
121	Oliver Garrod	1973 – 1974	"Hibernation of mammals"
122	Kenneth Owen	1974 – 1975	
123	Kenneth Heathfield	1975 – 1976	
124	Henry Thompson	1976 – 1978	
125	A. Kingsley Brown	1978 – 1979	
126	Douglas Langton Woolf	1979 – 1980	
127	David Morris	1980 – 1981	
128	G.W.E. Little	1981 – 1982	
129	David T.D. Hughes	1982 – 1983	
130	N.F.E. Burrows	1983 – 1984	
131	W.J.C. Currie	1984 – 1985	

== 1985 - 2000 ==
132	Anne M. Jepson	1985 – 1986	
133	Georges Jantet	1986 – 1987	
134	C.H. Flood	1987 – 1988	
135	David W. Findlay	1988 – 1989	
136	Elliot Philipp (1915 – 2010)	1989 – 1990	
137	Christopher Wastell (1932 – 2012)	1990 – 1991	A member of the Hunterian Society, he delivered the society’s oration in 1988 on "John Hunter-a man of his time". Two years later he became its president and delivered his address, "Pedagogues and surgeons", in which he posed the question "are professors of surgery necessary?"
138	Basil Helal	1991 – 1992	
139	A.E. Fyfe	1992 – 1993	
140	Derek W. Zutshi	1993 – 1994	
141	Michael Dulake (1928 – 2016)	1994 – 1995	
142	R.M. Kirk	1995 – 1996	
143	Ravi Kunzru	1996 – 1997	
144	Sir Montague Levine	1997 – 1998	
145	Jeffrey Rosenberg	1998 – 1999	
146	Brian Owen-Smith	1999 – 2000	

== 2000 - 2015 ==
Nº	Portrait	Name (Birth–Death)	Term	Oration/notes
147		Barbara Ansell	2000 – 2001	
148		James P.S. Thomson	2001 – 2002	
149		Michael Laurence	2002 – 2003	
150		Brian Gibberd	2003 – 2004	
151		Harvey White	2004 – 2005	
152		John Maynard	2005 – 2006	
153		Stephen Challacombe	2006 – 2007	
154		Neil Weir	2007 – 2008	
155		Richard Cory-Pearce	2008 – 2009	
156		Nicholas Cambridge	2009 – 2011	
157		Ian Stephen	2011 – 2012	
158		Prokar Dasgupta	2012 – 2013	
159		Sue Weir	2013 – 2014	

== 2015 - 2026 ==
Nº	Portrait	Name (Birth–Death)	Term	Oration/notes
160		Nigel Thomas	2015 – 2017	
161		John Skipper	2017 – 2018	
162		Stephen Challacombe	2018 – 2019	
163		Susan Standring	2019 – 2021	
164		Richard Pusey	2021 – 2022	
165		Mike Gleeson	2022 – 2023	
166		John Tricker	2023 – 2024	
167		Cathy Corbishley	2024 – 2026	
168		Roger Kirby	2026-	

== Bibliography ==
- Fotherby, Henry I. (1869). Scientific associations : their rise, progress, and influence : with a history of the Hunterian Society : an oration Fotherby. London: Bell & Daldy.
- Fowler, Robert (1882). The Attributes, Professional and Social, of the So-Called "Family Doctor". Verlag. ISBN 978-3-385-39190-1.
