= Hunterian Society =

English society of physicians and dentists

- Hunterian Society
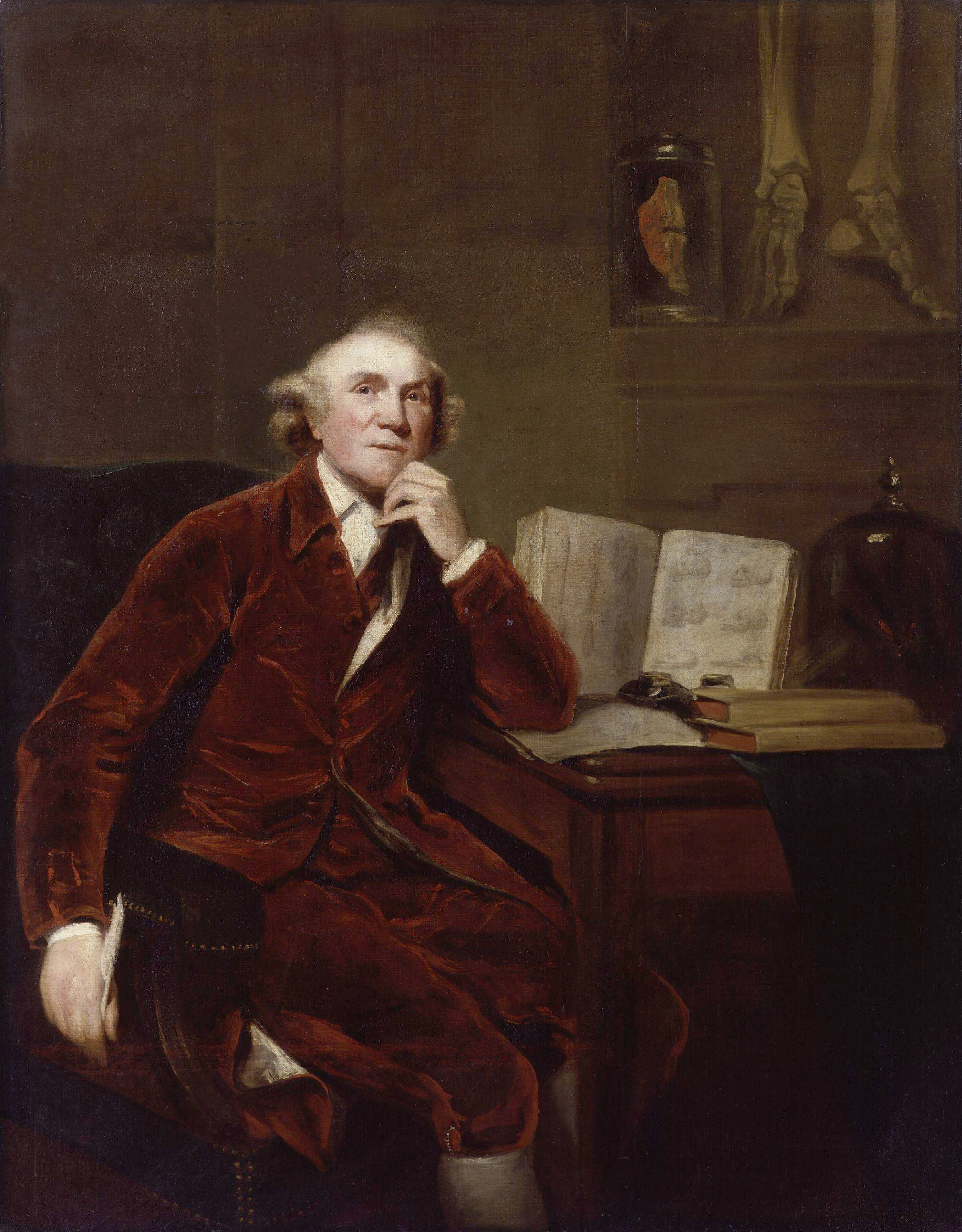
- John Hunter by John Jackson
- Formation: 1819
- Headquarters: Medical Society of London
- Location: London, UK

The Hunterian Society, founded in February 1819 in honour of the Scottish surgeon John Hunter (1728–1793), is a medical society based at the Medical Society of London, London.

Established by William Cooke, a general practitioner, and Thomas Armiger, a surgeon, who both practiced in the City of London and the East End of London, the Society has devoted its activities for over two hundred years towards the pursuit of medical knowledge and learning. Meetings are always held over dinner, which precedes the subject for debate.

Between 1815 and 1828, Sir William Blizard (1743–1835), who was a former pupil of John Hunter, praised Hunter at the Royal College of Surgeons of England in three Hunterian Orations, and it is believed to be due to his influence that the new Society adopted the name 'Hunterian', rather than 'The London Medical and Physical Society', which was the name first proposed for it.

Blizard became the Society's first President and had the aim of keeping it within the Hunterian tradition. In an oration of 1826, he said: "May the honoured name of Hunter ever have a magic influence on the minds of its members".

The Society promotes an annual oration and awards an annual medal.

== Hunterian Society Oration ==
According to the rules of the society: "The Annual Oration, to be called the Hunterian Society Oration, shall be delivered by the Orator for the current session, at a Meeting of the Society. The primary purpose of the Oration is to Commemorate the life and work of John Hunter, as also of his brother William Hunter, and to set forth the influence of the Hunterian example and tradition in the development of the science and art of Medicine. This tradition includes exact observation, experiment, and the application of anatomical and physiological science, human and comparative, to practical Medicine. It is not intended to exclude from the scope of the Annual Oration topics bearing upon the History of Medicine, and upon the relation of Medicine to other sciences and to human life in its widest sense, as well as other topics which cannot suitably be made the subject of an ordinary medical communication"..

Not to be confused with the Hunterian oration at the Royal College of Surgeons of England.

== Orators ==
- 2025: Dr Adam Rutherford
- 2024: Dr Simon Spiro
- 2023: Dr Owase Jeelani
- 2022: Sir Mark Walport
- 2021: Mungo Campbell
- 2020: no oration due to covid-19 pandemic
- 2019: Prof David Cooper
- 2018: W.J. Coker
- 2017: no oration
- 2016: Prof Nigel Heaton
- 2015: Prof Martin Birchall
- 2014: Prof Martin Mailey
- 2013: Andrew Leather
- 2012: Timothy Martin Cox
- 2010: Michael Crumplin, John Hunter and Medical Aspects of the Peninsular War
- 2009: Sir Bruce Keogh
- 2008: Richard Ramsden
- 2007: John Greenspan
- 2006: Prof Steven Challacombe
- 2005: Barry M. Jones, Facial Aesthetic Surgery: The use of scientific principles to optimise outcome and limit risk.
- 2004: W. Randolph Chitwood, Robotic Cardiac Surgery - In John Hunter's Shadow
- 2003: Prof Clement Sledge
- 2002: William Shand
- 2000: Prof Gedree Sheldon
- 1999: Paul Michael Aichroth
- 1998: Robert Maurice-Williams
- 1997: Prof Anthony William Goode
- 1996: Barbara Ansell CBE
- 1995: Prof Lewis Wolpert
- 1994: Brian Owen-Smith, Hunter, Hedgehogs and Hibernation
- 1993: Dame Josephine Barnes
- 1992: Harvey White
- 1991: John Kirkup, John Hunter's Surgical Instruments and Surgical Procedures
- 1990: Barry Jackson
- 1989: Raymond M. Kirk
- 1988: Prof Christopher Wastell, John Hunter - a man of his time
- 1987: Basil Helal
- 1986: Elliot Philipp
- 1985: Douglas Woolf
- 1984: A. Kingsley-Brown MBE
- 1983: D. Geraint James
- 1982: Miss Jessie Dobson
- 1981: David Hughes
- 1980: A. Phillips
- 1979: F.J. Hebbert
- 1978: Kenneth Owens
- 1977: Reginald S. Murley
- 1976: Henry S. Pasmore, John Hunter in Kensington
- 1975: Sir Gordon Wolstenholme OBE
- 1974: David Morris
- 1973: Sir Thomas Holmes Sellors PRCS
- 1972: George Qvist
- 1971: Edward F. Stewart
- 1970: Oliver Garrod MBE
- 1969: Sir Henry Osmond-Clark CBE
- 1968: Alistair L. Gunn
- 1967: Sir Eric Riches
- 1966: Lt-Gen Sir Robert Drew CBE
- 1965: Francis E. Camps
- 1964: Sir Clement Clapton Chesterman OBE
- 1963: Alexander Ernest Roche
- 1962 A. Lawrence Abel
- 1961: Sir Cecil Wakeley KBE
- 1960: C. Robert Rudolf
- 1959: Sir Arthur Porritt, John Hunter's Women
- 1958 McDonald Critchley
- 1957 Alec W. Badenoch
- 1956: Sir Henry Cohen
- 1955: Lionel E.C. Norbury
- 1954: Sir Gordon Gordon-Taylor
- 1953: A. Dickson Wright
- 1952: George Day, P.P.S. : Pneuma, Psyche, and Soma
- 1951: William E. Tanner
- 1950: Sir Daniel T. Davies, John Hunter, the Man and his Message
- 1949: Sir Heneage Ogilvie KBE
- 1948: William Sydney Charles Copeman OBE
- 1947: V. Zachary Cope
- 1940–46: no oration
- 1939: Cedric Lane-Roberts, A Plea for the Woman in Gynaecology and Obstetrics
- 1937: Lord Horder, Hunter, the great Researcher
- 1936: Sir G. Lenthal Cheatle, John Hunter's Time and Our Own Time
- 1935: Prof John Eyre, Undulant Fever; A Retrospect
- 1934: Basil T. Parsons-Smith, Cardiac Failure in the 18th Century and its Modern Conception
- 1933: Sir Thomas Crisp English KCMG
- 1932: J.B. Christopherson
- 1931: A.E. Mortimer Woolf
- 1930: J. Campbell McLure, Psychology and the Practice of Medicine
- 1929: A.W. Sheen CBE
- 1928: Howard Atwood Kelly 200th Anniversary of Birth of John Hunter.
- 1928: Anthony Feiling, Sciatica: its varieties and Treatments
- 1927: Girling Ball, The Value of Modern Methods of Investigation in the Diagnosis and Treatment of Haematuria
- 1926: George Newman, The Private Practitioner as Pioneer in Preventive Medicine
- 1925: H. Letheby Tidy, On the Haemorrhagic Diathesis: Angio-Staxis
- 1924: Sir Sydney R. Wells
- 1923: Herbert William Carson, The Evolution of the Modern Treatment of Septic Peritonitis
- 1922: Theodore Thompson, Upon Alimentary Toxaemia in Nervous Disorders
- 1921: Sir Arbuthnot Lane KCMG
- 1920: Leonard Hill FRS, On Blood Vessels and Pressure
- 1919: Hugh Lett CBE
- 1918: Oliver K. Williamson, On the Symptoms Which Precede and are Associated with General Arterio-Sclerosis
- 1917: W. Langdon Brown, On the Hunterian Tradition in Cardiac Research
- 1916: A.S. Currie
- 1915: Henry Russell Andrews, William Hunter and his Work in Midwifery
- 1914: Arnold Chaplin
- 1913: Edward W Goodall, On Serum Sickness
- 1912: Thomas Oliver Lyon, The Care of Consumptives. A Review and a Forecast.
- 1911: James H. Sequeira, On the Progress of Dermatology since Hunter's Time
- 1910: R. Fortescue Fox, On some Principals in the Treatment of Chronic Disease
- 1909: William Rawes
- 1908: William James McCulloch Ettles
- 1907: Lauriston Elgie Shaw
- 1906: Alfred Herbert Tubby, Recent Surgical Methods in the Treatment of Certain Types of Paralysis
- 1905: Francis Rowland Humphreys, Excretion, more Especially in regard to Vicarious Excretion in Bright's Disease
- 1904: John Francis Woods, On the Psychic Side of Therapeutics
- 1903: Thomas Horrocks Openshaw
- 1902: Arthur Templar Davies, On Organo-Therapy
- 1901: John Poland, A Retrospect of Surgery During the Past Century
- 1900: Frederick John Smith, On then and now; or, the Influence of Modern Surgery upon Medical Practice
- 1899: Sir Hugh Reeve Beevor, 5th Baronet, On the Declension of Phthisis (Pulmonary Tuberculosis)
- 1898: Peter Horrocks
- 1897: Richard Kingston Fox, William Hunter, Anatomist, Physician, Obstetrician
- 1896: George Newton Pitt, Reflections on John Hunter as a Physician and on his Relation to the Medical Societies of the Last Century
- 1895: Sir Patrick Manson FRS
- 1894: James Dundas Grant
- 1893: John Sell Edmund Cotton
- 1892: Charters James Symonds
- 1891: Fletcher Beach, Psychological Medicine in John Hunter's Time and the Progress it has Since Made
- 1890: Sir Stephen Mackenzie
- 1889: George Ernest Herman
- 1888: Richard Clement Lucas, On the life-work of John Hunter and his Influence on Surgery
- 1887: Alfred Lewis Galabin, The Etiology of Puerperal Fever
- 1886: Sir Andrew Clark, 1st Baronet FRS
- 1885: James Edward Adams
- 1884: Francis Charlewood Turner
- 1883: Edward Gillette Gilbert
- 1882: Robert Fowler, The attributes, professional and social, of the so-called "Family Doctor"
- 1881: Alfred Henry Smee
- 1880: Philip Henry Pye-Smith FRS
- 1879: Walter Rivington
- 1878: Peter Lodwick Burchell, A Brief Sketch of the Ancient History of Medicine
- 1877: Walter Moxon
- 1876: Henry Gawen Sutton
- 1875: Henry Gervis
- 1874: John Couper
- 1873: Arthur Edward Durham
- 1872: John Hughlings Jackson FRS, The Physiological Aspects of Education
- 1871: Thomas Boor Crosby, Modern Medicine: has it kept pace in advancement with the times?
- 1870: Thomas Bryant on Drugs and their Uses
- 1869: Henry Isaac Fotherby
- 1868: John Braxton Hicks FRS
- 1867: William Sedgwick Saunders
- 1866: Dennis de Berdt Hovell
- 1865: Jonathan Hutchinson FRS, The Advance of Physic
- 1864: John Jackson
- 1863: Robert Barnes
- 1862: Thomas Bevill Peacock
- 1861: Sir William Withey Gull FRS
- 1860: Stephen Henry Ward
- 1859: Alfred Smee FRS
- 1858: William Munk
- 1857: Henry Oldham
- 1856: Thomas Calloway, jnr
- 1855: Joseph Ridge
- 1854: George Owen Rees FRS
- 1853: Thomas Mee Daldy
- 1852: William James Little
- 1851: John Charles Weaver Lever
- 1850: George Critchett
- 1849: Sir James Risdon Bennett
- 1848: Thomas Blizard Curling FRS
- 1847: George Hilaro Barlow
- 1846: John Adams
- 1845: John Thomson
- 1844: John Hilton
- 1843: Francis Henry Ramsbotham
- 1842: Samuel Solly FRS
- 1841: Samuel Ashwell
- 1840: Thomas Bell FRS
- 1839: William Cooke, Minds and the Emotions considered in relation to Health
- 1838: William Coulson
- 1837: Benjamin Guy Babington FRS
- 1836: Bransby Blake Cooper FRS
- 1832: Archibald Billing FRS
- 1831: Charles Aston Key
- 1830: John Tricker Conquest
- 1829: Benjamin Travers FRS
- 1828: Benjamin Robinson
- 1827: William Babington
- 1826: Sir William Blizard FRS (Inaugural Oration)

== Hunterian Society awards ==
The Hunterian Medal, the Hunterian Scholarship(s) and the Hunterian Prize and are awarded at the discretion of the council.

The Hunterian Medal shall be awarded at the discretion of Council from time to time to an individual who is judged to have made an outstanding contribution to the Science and Practice of Medicine.

The Hunterian Scholarship: to assist with the fees and examination for the History of Medicine Course of the Worshipful Society of Apothecaries of London, shall be awarded at the discretion of Council from time to time to a fully registered, non-Consultant grade doctor, dentist, medical scientist, medical student or dental student on the basis of the submission of a dissertation with some relevance to John or William Hunter or medicine in the 18th century.

The Hunterian Prize: The Society awards an annual prize of £500, to a student or practitioner of non-consultant grade in medicine or dentistry or a medical scientist, on the basis of an essay which may be modern but should have a Hunterian flavour. The shortlisted essays will be given as presentations to a meeting of the Society at Lettsom House.

Hunterian Prize winners:

- 2012 - Ian Alberts
- 2013 - Hutan Ashrafian
- 2014 - Emma Stapleton
- 2015 - Charlotte Whittingham, Aimee Rowe, Rajiv Dave (joint winners)
- 2016 - (no award made)
- 2017 - Mark McKelvie
- 2018 - Jake Suett
- 2019 - Mae-Sing Lim-Cooke, Nadine McCauley (joint winners)
- 2020 - Tamari Nyakunengwa 'John Hunter's unsung contribution to Obstetric Medicine'. Runners-up: Paul Williams, Anthony Yip, Sen Tan

== See also ==
- Presidents of the Hunterian Society

== Bibliography ==
- Findlay, David W. (ed.) The Hunterian Society - a catalogue of its records and collections relating to John Hunter and the Hunterian Tradition with a history of the society (London: The Hunterian Society, 1990)
