= Edward Rigby (disambiguation) =

Edward Rigby was an actor.

Edward Rigby may also refer to:

- Edward Rigby (priest), archdeacon of Niagara, 1964–1973
- Edward Rigby (died 1706), MP for Preston
- Edward Rigby (physician) (1747–1821), English physician, writer, and local politician
- Edward Rigby (obstetrician) (1804–1860), English obstetrician and medical writer
