= James H. Aveling =

British obstetrician (1828–1892)

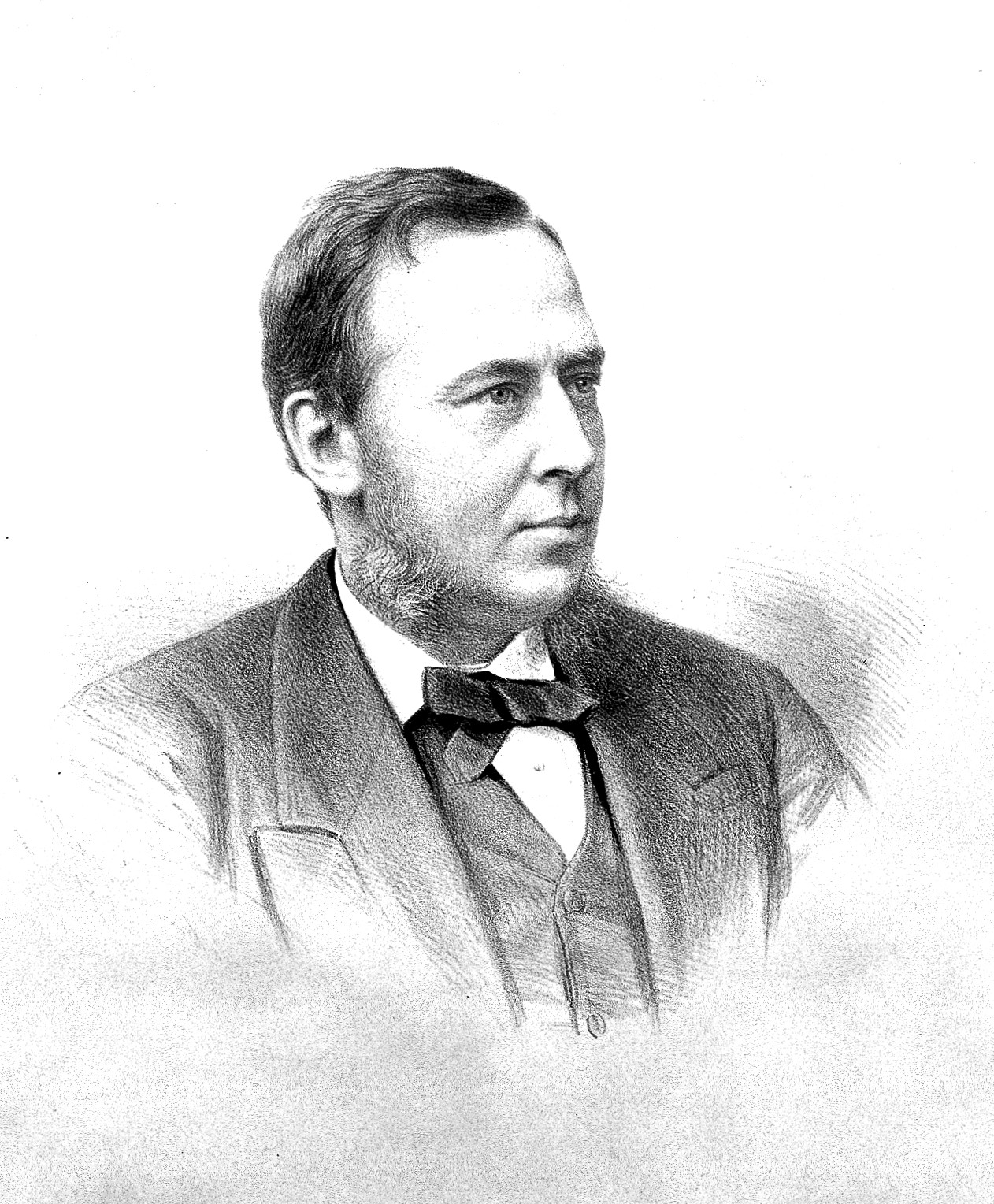
James Hobson Aveling, aged 49

James Hobson Aveling (Note: Aveling published both as J. H. Aveling and as James H. Aveling.) (25 January 1828 – 12 December 1892) was a British obstetrician and gynaecologist, author and inventor of medical devices. He practised in the Sheffield area and later in London, and was instrumental in founding two women's hospitals, the Sheffield Hospital for Women – one of the earliest such hospitals in England – and the Chelsea Hospital for Women. He advocated for better training and supervision of midwives. An innovative practitioner, he was one of the first to use chloroform as an anaesthetic in childbirth and also experimented with blood transfusion. His inventions include a device for treating uterine inversion. He wrote medical monographs and books on the history of obstetrics, most notably English Midwives, their History and Prospects (1872) and The Chemberlens and the Midwifery Forceps (1882), and was the founding editor of The Obstetrical Journal of Great Britain and Ireland (1873–76). Archaeology was among his interests; he was an elected fellow of the Society of Antiquaries (1877) and published a history of Roche Abbey (1870).

== Early life and education ==
James Hobson Aveling was born on 25 January 1828 in the Fenland District of Cambridgeshire, variously given as in Elm, near Wisbech, or in Whittlesea, to Ann (née Hobson; 1802–73) and Thomas Aveling (1801–35); the Avelings had long been associated with Cambridgeshire and his father owned a large estate in the county. He was the youngest of three brothers, with his eldest brother being the engineer and inventor Thomas Aveling. While he was still a child his father died; his mother married the clergyman John D'Urban a couple of years later, and removed the family to Hoo, near Rochester in Kent.

He read medicine at the University of Aberdeen, gaining a medal in anatomy (1848), qualifying MRCS (1851) and receiving MB (1856) and MD degrees (1857). At some point in the 1850s he is said to have studied under the Edinburgh obstetrician James Young Simpson, who discovered the anaesthetic properties of chloroform.

== Career ==
Aveling first practised in Ecclesfield, near Sheffield in South Yorkshire, in 1852, and then moved to Sheffield itself in 1856, where he quickly established a flourishing practice. He early began to specialise in treating women, and was soon known for administering chloroform to women during labour. He was a lecturer in midwifery, gynaecology and paediatrics at Sheffield Medical School. He started to try to attract funds for a women's hospital in the town as early as 1857, and in 1863 established the (initially twelve-bed) Sheffield Hospital for Women (later the Jessop Hospital for Women), which opened in 1864 on Figtree Lane; his Lancet obituary and Oxford Dictionary of National Biography entry describe this as among England's earliest women's hospitals. He remained associated with the hospital as consulting medical officer until his death.

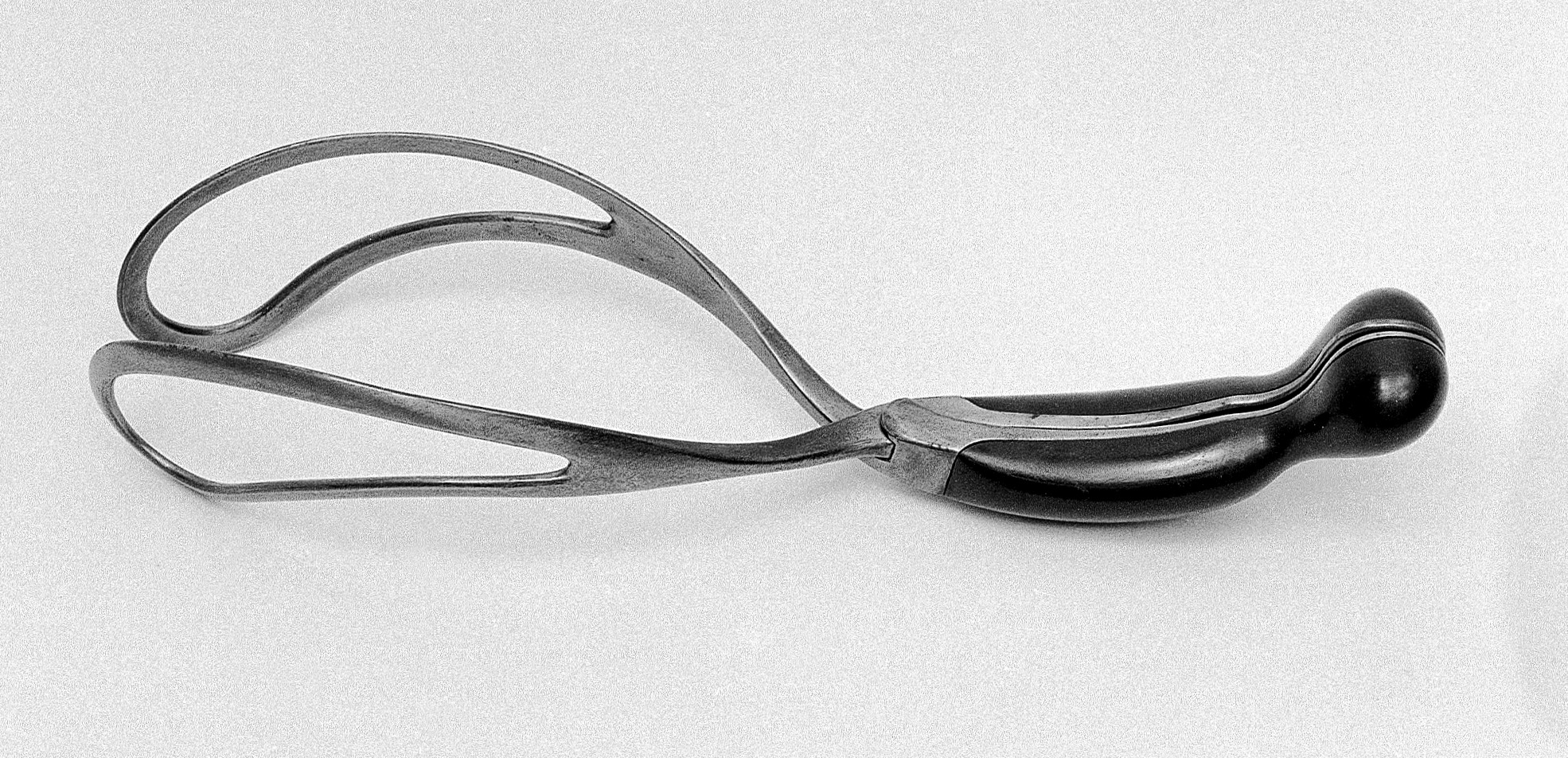
Aveling's forceps, showing the curved handle

In 1868 he left Sheffield, ostensibly because his wife was ill, but possibly to find a wider range of female patients. He briefly lived in Rochester, where Thomas Aveling was based, before establishing a practice on Upper Wimpole Street, London, in 1870 or 1871. There he specialised entirely in treating women and by the end of 1871, with Thomas Chambers and Robert Barnes, founded a small women's hospital on King's Road in Chelsea, which became known as the Chelsea Hospital for Women. Initially providing only six or eight beds, the hospital quickly grew to sixty beds. Aveling became one of the hospital's two senior physicians (with Barnes), retiring in 1886 but continuing to serve as consulting physician until his death. In retirement he was also associated with a new convalescent home at St Leonards-on-Sea in Sussex, which opened in 1891.

He had a long interest in the work of female midwives, passionately advocating for their better education as well as for requiring them to register. J. Watt Black, president of Obstetrical Society of London, considered him to be the most important advocate for obligatory registration. Aveling served as an examiner from the outset of the Obstetrical Society's (voluntary) examination board for midwives (1872), and chaired the board (1878–82).

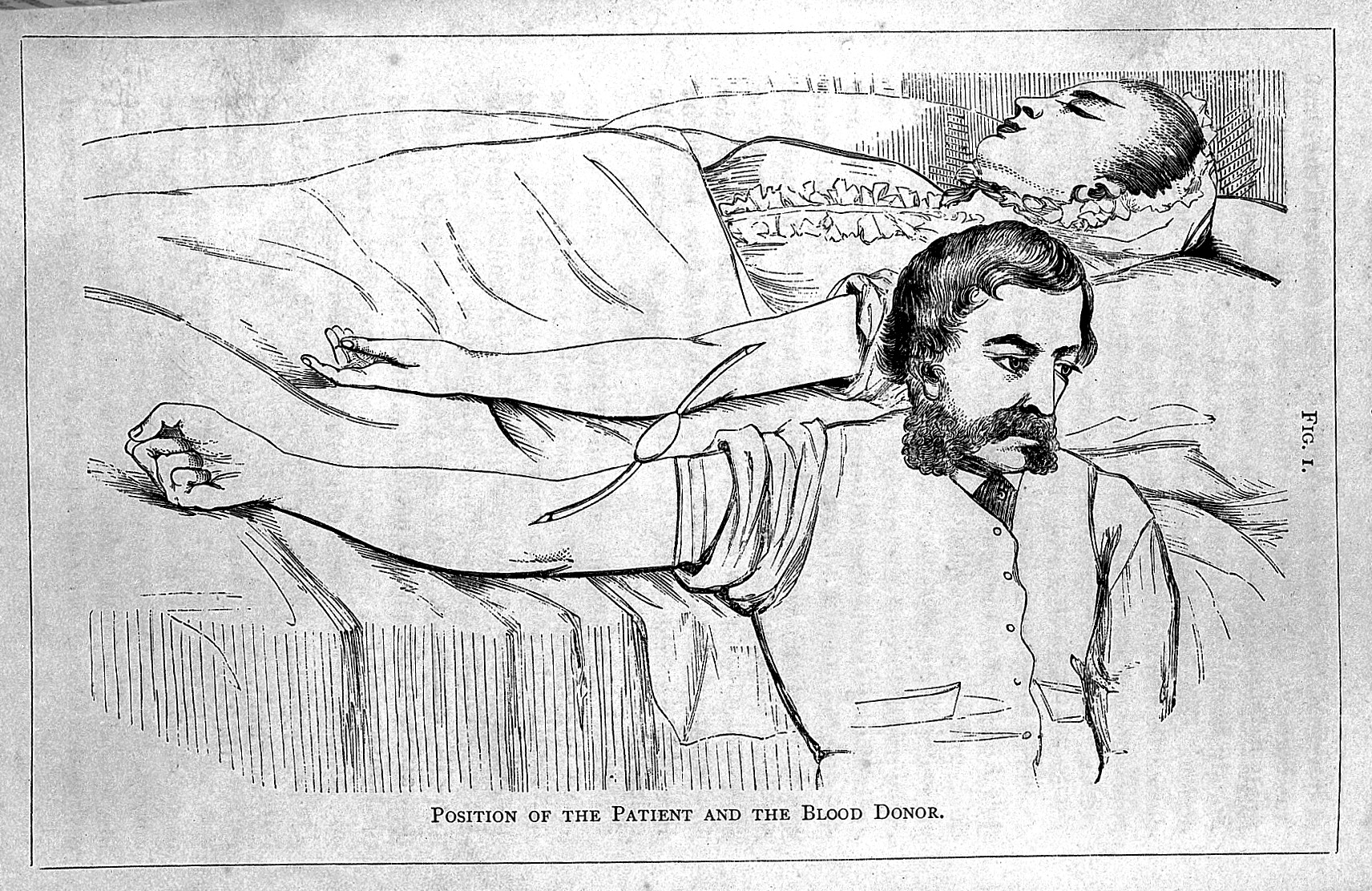
Blood transfusion, from his 1873 paper

As a medical inventor he altered the standard obstetrical forceps, introducing the perineal curve to the handle (1868), and invented shot and coil sutures, the polyptrite (a device for destroying endometrial polyps; 1862), the sigmoid repositor (a device for treating chronic uterine inversion; 1878), and a glass-tube applicator for menstrual tampons. The repositor – a wooden cup supported by elastic attached to sigmoid-shaped metal supports – was the most successful device for cases of uterine inversion, and was still remembered in 1967. He invented an apparatus for blood transfusion, with silver cannulae connected by rubber tubing with a central bulb for pumping, with which he performed a transfusion directly between a woman with postpartum bleeding and her coachman in 1872. He also experimented unsuccessfully with transfusing animal (lamb) blood. He was among the first to use chloroform as an anaesthetic in childbirth, and was a proponent of using electricity to treat diseases of the pelvis, particularly uterine cancers, following Georges Apostoli.

His British Medical Journal obituary describes him as an "able man, a hard worker, and a conscientious practitioner", while that of the Lancet characterises him not only as an "earnest worker" but also as unusually "original" and "inventive".

== Writing, editing and societies ==
As a writer, he is now best known for his contributions to documenting the history of obstetrics, particularly the book English Midwives, their History and Prospects (1872), described in 1967 as a "minor classic in obstetric histiography" for its "vivid" portrayals of 65 midwives spanning a period of 300 years. His other histories are Memorials of Harvey (1875) and The Chemberlens and the Midwifery Forceps (1882), about the inventors of the obstetrical forceps. He also wrote medical monographs including The Influence of Posture on Women in Gynecic and Obstetric Practice (1878) and On the Inversion of the Uterus (1886). He was the founding editor of The Obstetrical Journal of Great Britain and Ireland (1873–76), and was among the initial members of the Obstetrical Society of London (1859) as well as its splinter group, the British Gynaecological Society (1884), of which he was the founding vice-president.

In addition to his works in the medical field, he was interested in archaeology, and published History of Roche Abbey (Yorkshire) from its Foundation to its Dissolution (1870), as well as Fables, a book in verse (1886). He was elected a fellow of the Society of Antiquaries (1877) and served as president of the Sheffield Literary and Philosophical Society (1865).

== Personal life ==
He married Charlotte Jane Bryce (1829–96) on 19 April 1853 in Edinburgh; her father was a Free Church of Scotland minister in Aberdeen. The marriage did not result in any children.

Aveling died of typhoid fever on 12 December 1892, at Upper Wimpole Street in London. His remains were cremated at Woking Crematorium.

== Selected publications ==
Books and monographs

- On Vaginal Lithotomy (J.E. Adlard; 1864), booklet reprinted from Transactions of the Obstetrical Society of London
- History of Roche Abbey (Yorkshire) from its Foundation to its Dissolution (Robert White; 1870)
- English Midwives, their History and Prospects (Churchill, 1872; reprinted by Elliott, 1967, with a biographical introduction by John L. Thornton)
- On Nidation in the Human Female (1874)
- Memorials of Harvey: including a letter and autographs in facsimile (J. & A. Churchill, 1875), booklet
- The Influence of Posture on Women in Gynecic and Obstetric Practice (J. & A. Churchill; 1878)
- The Chemberlens and the Midwifery Forceps: memorials of the family and an essay on the invention of the instrument (J. & A. Churchill; 1882)
- On Inversion of the Uterus: with eleven cases successfully treated by the sigmoid repositor (J. & A. Churchill; 1886)
- Fables, a book in verse (Longmans, Green, and Co.; 1886)
- The Diagnosis and Electrical Treatment of Early Extra-uterine Gestation (John Bale & Sons, 1888), booklet

Research paper

- J. H. Aveling (1873). Immediate transfusion in England: seven cases, and the author's method of operating. The Obstetrical Journal of Great Britain and Ireland 289: 311

== References and notes ==
Sources

- Thomas F. Baskett. Eponyms and Names in Obstetrics and Gynaecology (3rd edn) (Cambridge University Press; 2019) doi:10.1017/9781108421706.010, ISBN 9781108421706
- Boel Berner. Strange Blood: The Rise and Fall of Lamb Blood Transfusion in 19th Century Medicine and Beyond (Transcript Verlag; 2020) JSTOR j.ctv371bscm.8, ISBN 9783837651638
- Rose George. Nine Pints: A Journey Through the Mysterious, Miraculous World of Blood (Portobello Books; 2018) ISBN 9781846276132
