= Kelson =

Kelson may refer to:

== Surname ==
- George Kelson (1835–1920), English amateur cricketer and sport angler
- John Joseph Kelson Jr. (1922–2012), known professionally as Jackie Kelso, American jazz musician
- Mark Kelson (b. 1976), Australian musician
- William Henry Kelson (1862–1940), English physician and writer

== Given name ==
- Kelson Pinto (b. 1976), Brazilian professional boxer

== Places ==
- Kelson, New Zealand, a suburb of Lower Hutt in Wellington, New Zealand

== Other ==
- A variant term for the keelson, a reinforcing structural member on top of the keel in the hull of a vessel
