= Obstetrical Society of London =

British medical society

The Obstetrical Society of London was formed in 1858 and merged in 1907 with the Royal Medical and Chirurgical Society of London to form the Royal Society of Medicine (RSM).

== History ==
The Society was set up in 1858, the successor to an Obstetric Society dating from 1825, and in the aftermath of the Medical Act 1858. The founding group included James Hobson Aveling, Robert Barnes, Graily Hewitt, Henry Oldham, Edward Rigby, William Tyler Smith, Thomas Hawkes Tanner, John Edward Tilt, Sir Charles Locock and Sir George Duncan Gibb.

Over its first 15 years the membership of the Society rose to about 600. The Act's proposals included regulation of medical practitioners, taken at the time to include midwifery; and the Society turned in time to certifying midwives. The diploma introduced in 1872 recognised the role of the midwife, in supervising "normal labour" and commonly appeared in advertisements or curricula vitae as Cert., L.O.S. Training was provided at London hospitals such as City of London Lying-in Hospital.

A dispute over ovariotomy, which other members opposed, led Barnes to leave and found the British Gynaecological Society in 1884. In the election for the presidency at the end of that year, matters came to a head when Alfred Meadows, supported by Aveling and Barnes, failed to be chosen by the Council. In 1907 both societies merged into the Royal Society of Medicine.

== Presidents ==
Presidents of the Society served a two-year term.

- 1859 Edward Rigby
- 1861 William Tyler Smith
- 1863 Henry Oldham
- 1865 Robert Barnes
- 1867 John Hall Davis
- 1869 Graily Hewitt
- 1871 John Braxton Hicks
- 1873 Edward John Tilt
- 1875 William Overend Priestley
- 1877 Charles West
- 1879 William Smoult Playfair
- 1881 James Matthews Duncan
- 1883 Henry Gervis
- 1885 John Baptiste Potter
- 1887 John Williams
- 1889 Alfred Lewis Galabin
- 1891 James Watt Black
- 1893 George Ernest Herman
- 1895 Francis Henry Champneys
- 1897 Charles James Cullingworth
- 1899 Alban Doran
- 1901 Peter Horrocks
- 1903 Edward Malins
- 1905 William Radford Dakin
- 1907 Herbert Ritchie Spencer, who became President of the Obstetrical and Gynaecological Section of the Royal Society of Medicine after the merger.
