= Samuel Solly =

English surgeon

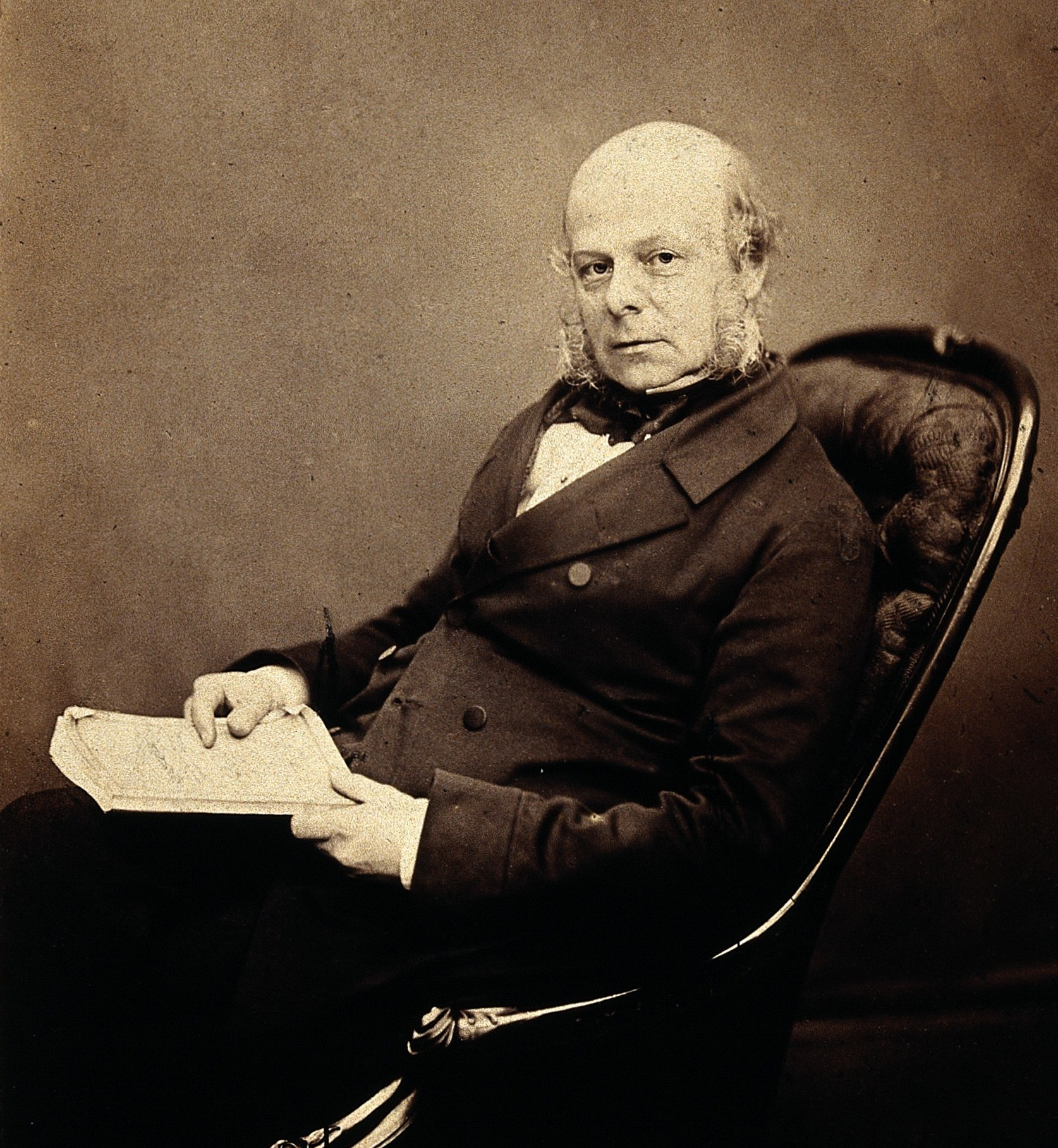
- Born: 13 May 1805
- Died: 24 September 1871 (aged 66)
- Occupation: Surgeon

Samuel Solly FRS (13 May 1805 – 24 September 1871) was an English surgeon.

== Biography ==
Samuel Solly was the son of Isaac Solly, a Baltic merchant. He was born on 13 May 1805 in Jeffrey Square, St. Mary Axe. Solly was educated under Eliezer Cogan of Higham Hill, Walthamstow, where Benjamin Disraeli, Dr. Renn Hampden, afterwards bishop of Hereford, and Russell Gurney, were among his schoolfellows. He was articled, somewhat against the wish of his father, in May 1822, to Benjamin Travers, surgeon to St. Thomas's Hospital, and he was one of the last of the surgeons to a London hospital who succeeded to his post by the payment of a large apprenticeship fee. He was admitted a member of the Royal College of Surgeons of England on 9 May 1828, and he then went to Paris to continue his medical studies. He commenced practice in his father's premises at St. Mary Axe in 1831, moving to St. Helen's in 1837, to Aston Key's house, on the death of that surgeon, in 1849, and afterwards to Savile Row. From 1833 to 1839 he was lecturer on anatomy and physiology in the medical school of St. Thomas's Hospital. He was appointed assistant-surgeon to St. Thomas's Hospital in 1841; twelve years later he became full surgeon, and was appointed lecturer on surgery. He was called upon to resign the office of surgeon in 1865, under a new rule which required the medical officers to retire at the age of sixty. He pleaded that the rule was not retrospective, and was reappointed till he should have completed his term of twenty years as full surgeon. His health gave way, however, and he resigned before the expiration of his term of office. Elected a fellow of the Royal College of Surgeons of England in 1843, he became a member of its council in 1856, and was twice a vice-president. He was elected a member of the court of examiners in 1867, and held the post of Arris and Gale professor of human anatomy and surgery in 1862. He was president of the Royal Medical and Chirurgical Society in 1867–8, and became a fellow of the Royal Society in 1836. He died suddenly at 6 Savile Row on 24 September 1871, and was buried at Chislehurst, Kent.

He married, on 22 May 1834, Jane, daughter of the Rev. Joseph Barrett, and by her had seven sons and four daughters.

Solly was a skilful operator, a florid lecturer, and a good clinical teacher; his opinion was specially sought in cases of injuries to the head and in diseases of the joints. He had a taste for art, and was skilful in the use of brush and pencil; his watercolour pictures more than once adorned the walls of the Royal Academy (Graves, Dict. of Artists, p. 220). He made his own lecture illustrations, many of which were purchased by the authorities of St. Thomas's Hospital in 1841.

After his death a marble bust was presented to St. Thomas's Hospital, and a Solly prize and medal in the medical school was established from the proceeds of a public subscription in his memory.

He wrote:

- ‘The Human Brain … illustrated by references to the Nervous System in the Lower Orders of Animals,’ London, 8vo, 1836. The work is dedicated to Benjamin Travers, and is illustrated by twelve well-executed lithographic plates. A second edition, in which the plates are replaced by figures in the text, was issued in 1847.
- ‘Surgical Experiences,’ London, 8vo, 1865; containing the embodiment of his teaching as lecturer on surgery at St. Thomas's Hospital.
- ‘An Analysis of Johan Müller's “Intimate Structure of Secreting Glands,”’ London, 8vo, 1839; dedicated to Sir Astley Cooper, bart. He also contributed papers to medical periodicals and to the ‘Transactions’ of the Royal Medical and Chirurgical Society.
