= James Dundas-Grant =

British otorhinolaryngologist

Sir James Dundas-Grant KBE FRCS FRCSE
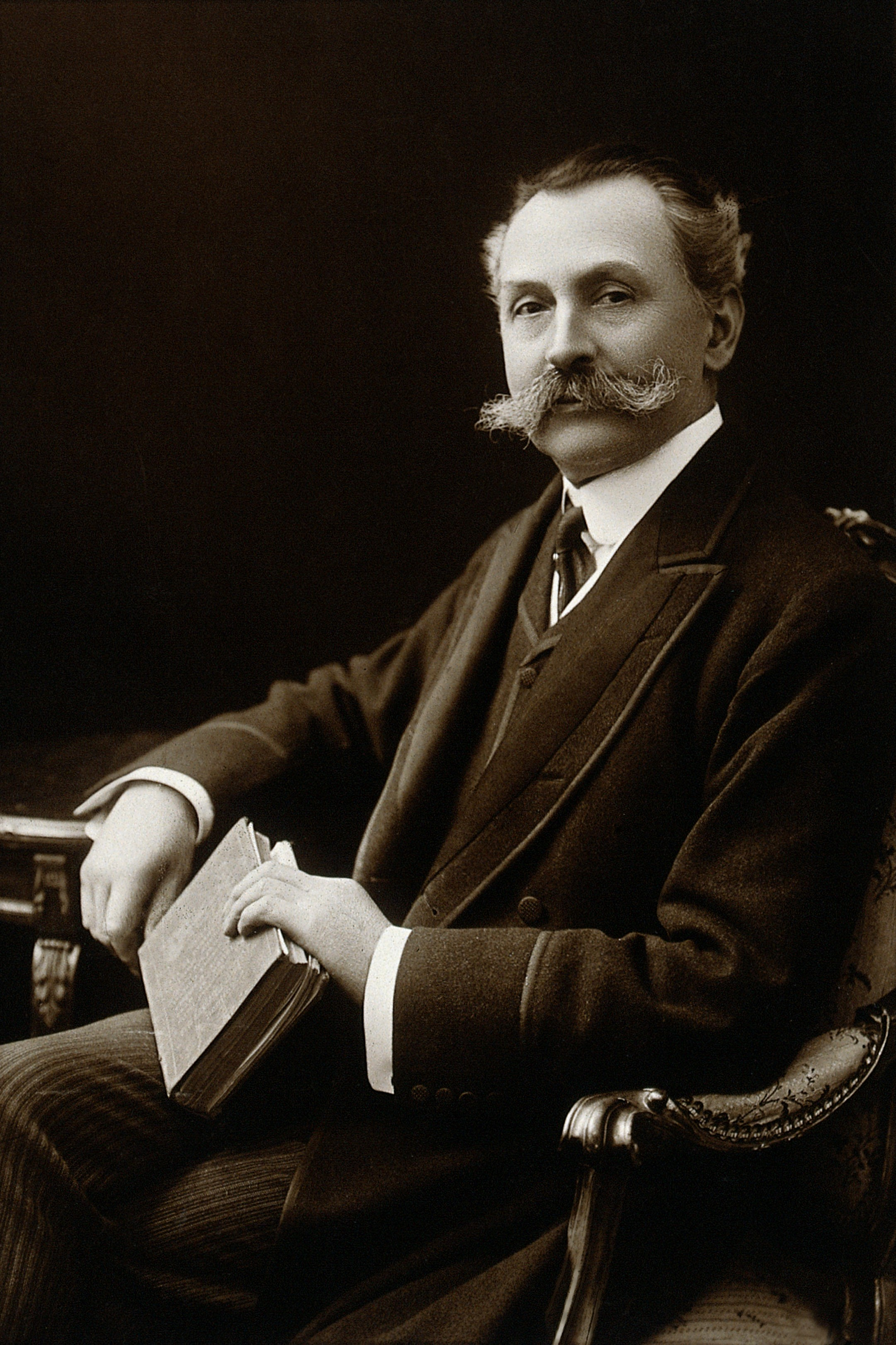
- Born: 13 June 1854; Edinburgh, Scotland
- Died: 13 November 1944 (aged 90); London, England
- Education: Edinburgh Academy; University of Edinburgh
- Occupation: Surgeon
- Spouse: Helen Frith (m. 1890)
- Children: 2
- Medical career
- Institutions: Central London Nose, Throat, and Ear Hospital
- Sub-specialties: Ear, Nose Throat surgery

Sir James Dundas-Grant KBE FRCS FRCSE (13 June 1854 – 13 November 1944) was a British ear, nose and throat surgeon. He was surgeon to a number of London hospitals and surgeon to several institutions. He was regarded as a prolific writer about a variety of topics within his speciality and devised a number of surgical instruments. In addition to his clinical practice he was president of several surgical speciality societies and was knighted in 1920.

== Early life ==
James Dundas-Grant was born in Edinburgh in 1854. His father was James Dundas-Grant, an Edinburgh advocate and his mother Louise Elizabeth Dundas-Grant (née Chapuy). He went to school at the Edinburgh Academy and finished his schooling at Dunkirk College in northern France. He matriculated as an undergraduate at the University of Edinburgh graduating Master of Arts (MA) in 1873. He then studied for a short time at the University of Würzburg in Bavaria before matriculating in the University of Edinburgh Medical School graduating MB CM in 1876. He was a house officer at the Edinburgh Royal Maternity Hospital then went on to set up in general practice in London. He had hospital attachments to Poplar Hospital and the Shadwell Lying-in Home and was able to attend clinics at London teaching hospitals, where his interest in oto-laryngology began. He graduated MD with honours from the University of Edinburgh in 1879. His first post in his chosen speciality was as a surgical registrar at the Central London Nose, Throat, and Ear Hospital (later the Royal National Throat, Nose and Ear Hospital).

== Surgical career ==
Dundas-Grant became pathologist and then surgeon at the Central London Nose, Throat, and Ear Hospital. He became a Fellow of the Royal College of Surgeons of Edinburgh (FRCSEd) in 1884 and of the Royal College of Surgeons of England six years later. He was also surgeon to the Brompton Hospital, the West End Hospital for Neurology and Neurosurgery, the Freemasons' Hospital and the Sussex Throat and Ear Hospital at Brighton. During WWI he was oto-laryngologist to several military hospitals including the King George Military Hospital, Lord Knutsford's Hospitals and the Russian Hospital for Officers. He also served as a surgeon-major in the reserve regiment the 24th Middlesex (Post Office) Rifle Volunteers and was medical officer to the London division of the National Reserve Corps.

He was a prolific writer contributing articles on a wide range of topics within his speciality. His knowledge of the specialty was regarded by colleagues as encyclopaedic. He had a particular panache for devising surgical instruments, several of which were widely used.

Dundas-Grant had a lifelong passion for music and was surgeon to the Royal Academy of Music and aural surgeon to the Royal Society of Musicians. A favourite pastime was conducting an orchestra which he had formed.

In 1917 he was made director of the aural clinics of the Ministry of Pensions and was appointed senior consultant to the ministry.

== Honours and awards ==
Dundas-Grant was a vice-president of the Royal Institution, president of the Section of Laryngology of the Royal Society of Medicine, president of the Section of Laryngology and Otology of the British Medical Association and president of the Hunterian Society. He was made an honorary member of specialist societies in France, Belgium, Germany and the United States. He was made a Knight Commander of the Order of the British Empire (KBE) in the 1920 Birthday Honours.

== Family ==
He married Helen Frith in 1890. They had two sons: Bramwell Dundas-Grant and Royal Navy Commander James Harold Dundas-Grant. The latter was an attender of the Inklings, the informal Oxonian literary discussion group associated with C.S. Lewis and J.R.R. Tolkien.

== Later life and death ==
A street accident in 1944 took its toll on his health and he died in London on 13 November 1944.

== Selected publications ==
- Labyrinth tests. Medical Press (1922), 103, 501.
- Enlarged tonsils and adenoids. West London Medical Journal. (1924), 29, 1.
- Catarrhal deafness. Practitioner, (1925), 64, 385.
- Tuberculosis and cancer of the larynx. Clinical Journal. (1925), 54, 469.
- Dundas-Grant, J (1934). "Aphonia of Forty-four Years' Duration caused by Inhalation of a Stud, requiring Tracheotomy: Voice reproduced during Digital Compression of Sides of Larynx". Proc R Soc Med. 27: 1275. doi:10.1177/003591573402700932. PMC 2205047. PMID 19989888.
- Dundas-Grant, J (1934). "Simplified Method of Determining Percentage of Actual Hearing-power in Tuning-fork Tests: (Section of Otology)". Proc R Soc Med. 27: 419–24. doi:10.1177/003591573402700448. PMC 2205105. PMID 19989696.
- Forcible nasal inspiration Br Med J. 1933 Feb 4;1(3761):183-4.
- Dundas-Grant, J (1931). "Carcinoma of Right Vocal Cord removed by Laryngofissure". Proc R Soc Med. 24: 1033–4. doi:10.1177/003591573102400828. PMC 2183149. PMID 19988187.
