= Thomas Blizard =

English surgeon (1772–1838)

- Born: 1772
- Died: 7 May 1838 (aged 65–66)
- Occupation: Surgeon

Thomas Blizard (1772 – 7 May 1838) was an English surgeon.

== Biography ==
Blizard became a pupil of his uncle, Sir William Blizard, and attained great skill as an operating surgeon. Having early become surgeon to the London Hospital, and gained a large and profitable city practice, he was able to retire on his fortune at the age of forty-six. He was notable both for his knowledge of anatomy and for his invention of a special knife for lithotomy. He died 7 May 1838. He was the author of a 'Description of an Extra-Uterine Fœtus' (Trans. Royal Soc. vol, v.), and of a 'Case of Intussusception of the Bowels'
