= Edward Tilt =

English physician (1815–1893)

Edward John Tilt (1815–1893) was an English physician and medical writer.

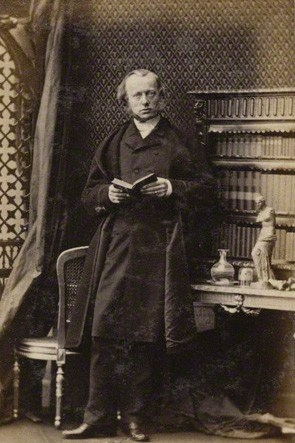
Edward John Tilt, 1861 photograph by Camille Silvy.

== Life ==
He was born at Brighton on 30 January 1815, and received his medical education first at St. George's Hospital and then in Paris, where he graduated M.D. on 15 May 1839. He does not appear to have held any English qualification until he became a member of the Royal College of Physicians of London in 1859.

Tilt acted as travelling physician in the family of Count Pyotr Andreyevich Shuvalov during 1848 to 1850. He settled in London about 1850, devoting himself to midwifery and the diseases of women: he had learned from Joseph Récamier in Paris the use of the speculum in gynaecology. In his practice Tilt opposed excessive surgery; but accepted some applications of clitoridectomy and leeches. He was then appointed physician-accoucheur to the Farringdon general dispensary and lying-in charity. He was one of the original fellows of the Obstetrical Society of London, where he took on subordinate posts, and was elected president for 1874–5.

The title of Cavaliere of the Crown of Italy was conferred upon him in 1875, and he was at the time of his death a corresponding fellow of the academies of medicine of Turin, Athens, and New York. He died at Hastings on 17 December 1893.

== Works ==
Tilt wrote:

- On Diseases of Menstruation and Ovarian Inflammation, London, 1850; 3rd edition 1862.
- On the Elements of Health and Principles of Female Hygiene, London, 1852; translated into German, Weimar, 1854.
- The Change of Life in Health and Disease, 2nd edition 1857; 4th edition New York, 1882.
- A Handbook of Uterine Therapeutics and of Diseases of Women, London, 1863; 4th edition New York, 1881; translated into German, Erlangen, 1864, and into Flemish, Leeuwarden, 1866.
- Health in India for British Women, London, 1875. The work was prompted by the government of India. It quoted James Ranald Martin, Joseph Fayrer, and statistics of Duncan Stewart who taught midwifery in Calcutta.

== Notes ==
Attribution

This article incorporates text from a publication now in the public domain: Lee, Sidney, ed. (1898). "Tilt, John Edward". Dictionary of National Biography. Vol. 56. London: Smith, Elder & Co.
