= Lett baronets =

Extinct baronetcy in the Baronetage of the United Kingdom

The Lett Baronetcy, of Walmer in the County of Kent, was a title in the Baronetage of the United Kingdom. It was created on 31 January 1941 for Hugh Lett, President of the Royal College of Surgeons. The title became extinct on his death in 1964.

== Lett baronets, of Walmer (1941) ==
- Sir Hugh Lett, 1st Baronet (1876–1964)

== Arms ==
Coat of arms of Lett baronets

Crest
An antique lamp Or inflamed Proper between two wings Sable.
Escutcheon
Argent on a fess Gules between in chief a rod Aesculapius between two grenades Sable fired Proper and in base a harp of the third a lion passant Or.
Motto
Sic Luceat Lux
