= Charles James Cullingworth =

English gynaecologist and obstetrician

Charles James Cullingworth (1841–1908) was an English gynaecologist and obstetrician.

== Early life ==
The son of Griffith Cullingworth, a bookseller, and his wife Sarah Gledhill of Eddercliff, he was born on 3 June 1841 in Leeds. Of Wesleyan stock, although he afterwards joined the Church of England, he was educated at Wesley College, Sheffield. On leaving school he was employed in his father's business, but on the latter's death in 1860 entered the Leeds School of Medicine (1861), and at the same time served four years as an apprentice to a general practitioner in Leeds. He became M.R.C.S. in 1865, and licentiate of the Society of Apothecaries in 1866.

== In Manchester ==
After 18 months as assistant in a country practice at Bawtry, Cullingworth entered the Manchester Royal Infirmary in 1867 as resident physician's assistant, and later was appointed resident medical officer. In 1869 he set up in private practice in Manchester, and from 1872 to 1882 was police surgeon.

In 1873 Cullingworth began specialist work, on being appointed honorary surgeon to Saint Mary's Hospital, Manchester for women and children. In 1881 he graduated M.D. at Durham University, and then gradually dropped private practice, becoming a consultant only. Appointed lecturer in medical jurisprudence at Owens College, in 1879, he made a success of teaching. In 1885 he was appointed to the chair of obstetrics and gynæcology in Owens College. He was secretary to the board of studies in medicine at Victoria University, Manchester, from 1883, when the university obtained in its charter power to confer degrees in medicine.

Cullingworth worked for the Manchester Medical Society for 19 years, as honorary librarian (1872–8) and honorary secretary (1879–84). In Manchester, too, he helped to found the Medical Chronicle, a monthly magazine providing abstracts of work in medical journals.

== In London ==
In 1888 Cullingworth gave up his posts at Manchester to become obstetric physician at St. Thomas's Hospital, London. He remained on the active staff until 1904, staying on for three years beyond the usual age limit. He was then appointed consulting obstetric physician and made a governor of the hospital. On moving to London he was appointed visiting physician to the General Lying-in Hospital, York Road.

In 1879 Cullingworth became a member of the Royal College of Physicians. In 1887 he was elected a fellow, and in 1902 he was the first obstetric physician to read the Bradshaw lecture, on Intraperitoneal hæmorrhage incident to ectopic gestation. For many years he was active in the Obstetrical Society of London.

== Last years ==
Cullingworth was prominent in the movement for securing the legal registration of midwives. After the Midwives Act 1902 he was appointed to represent the Incorporated Midwives Institute on the Central Midwives Board which was instituted for the proper working of the Act. He received the honorary degrees of D.C.L. from Durham in 1893 and LL.D. from Aberdeen in 1904; he was a member of numerous gynæcological societies at home and abroad.

During his later years Cullingworth suffered from angina pectoris, but continued his work till his death in London on 11 May 1908. He was buried in the St. Marylebone cemetery at Finchley.

== Works ==
Cullingworth did his major professional work on the causation of pelvic peritonitis, which he maintained was secondary to other conditions, and not a primary disease. On this subject he wrote Clinical Illustrations of the Diseases of the Fallopian Tubes and of Tubal Gestation, a series of drawings with descriptive text and histories of the cases (1895; 3rd edition 1902), and an article on pelvic inflammation for Clifford Allbutt, William Smoult Playfair and Thomas Watts Eden's System of Gynæcology. He also published:

- The Nurse's Companion, a Manual of General and Monthly Nursing, 1876;
- A Manual of Nursing, Medical and Surgical (1883; 3rd edit. 1889); and
- A Short Manual for Monthly Nurses (1884; 6th edit. 1907).

On strictly obstetrical and gynæcological topics Cullingworth generally wrote in the Transactions of the Obstetrical Society. He was one of the founders of the Journal of Obstetrics and Gynæcology of the British Empire, contributed some papers to it, and during the last two years of his life was its editor. A paper read before the Obstetrical Society in 1892, entitled The value of abdominal section in certain cases of recurrent peritonitis, based on a personal experience of fifty cases, gave rise widespread debate.

== Family ==
Cullingworth married in April 1882 Emily Mary, daughter of Richard and Harriet Freeman of London, and left one daughter.

== Notes ==
Attribution

This article incorporates text from a publication now in the public domain: Lee, Sidney, ed. (1912). "Cullingworth, Charles James". Dictionary of National Biography (2nd supplement). Vol. 1. London: Smith, Elder & Co.
