= Hugh Lett =

British surgeon

Sir Hugh Lett Bt KCVO CBE FRCS
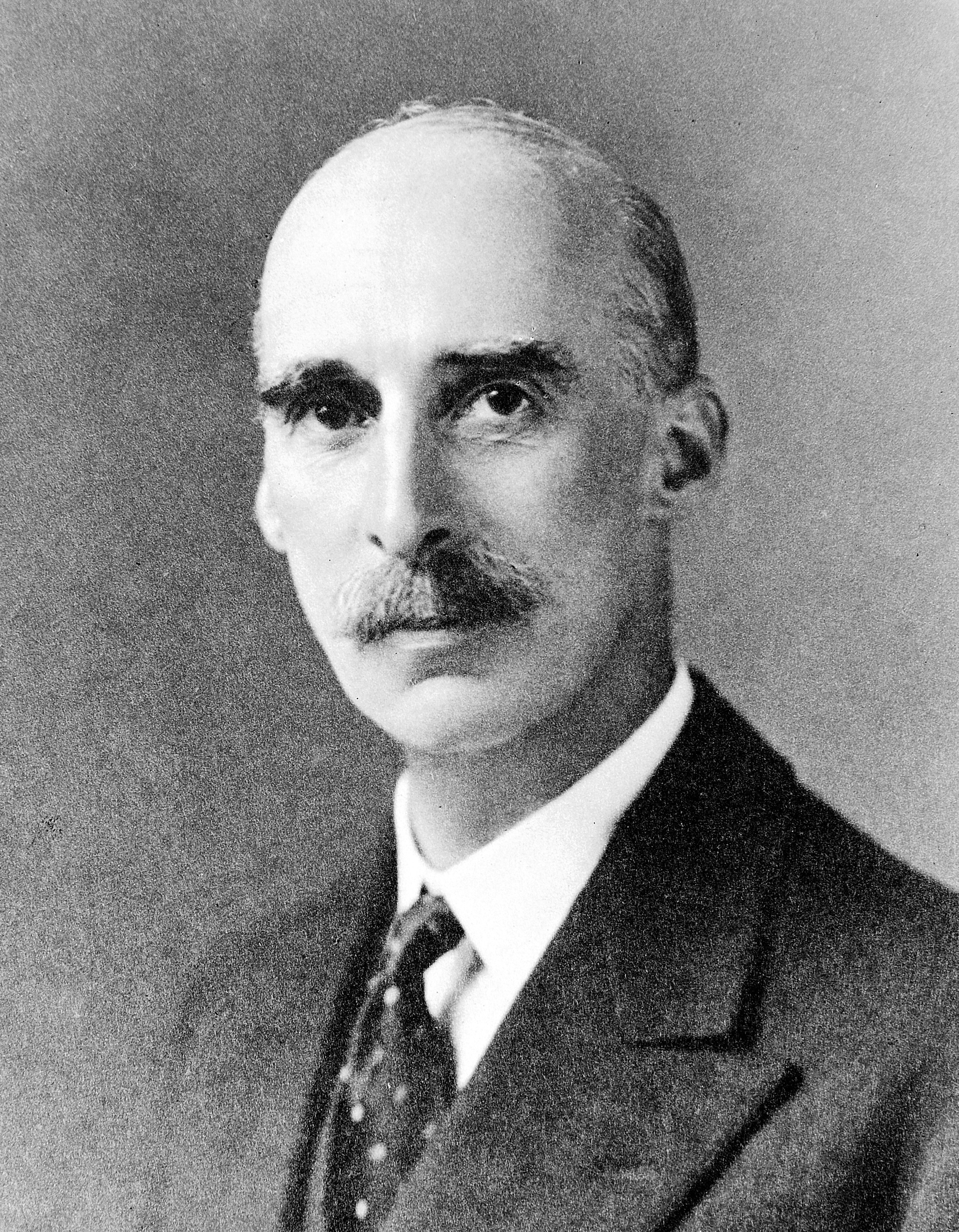
- Born: 17 April 1876; Waddingham, Lincolnshire, England
- Died: 19 July 1964 (aged 88)
- Education: Marlborough College; University of Leeds; London Hospital
- Medical career
- Field: General surgery Urology
- Institutions: London Hospital

Sir Hugh Lett, 1st Baronet, KCVO, CBE, FRCS (17 April 1876 – 19 July 1964) was a British surgeon with a special interest in urology who headed the London Hospital's genito-urinary department for many years.

He served on the council of the Royal College of Surgeons of England from 1927 to 1943 and was president from 1938 to 1940, following which he was created a Baronet in 1941. He was also appointed Knight Commander of the Royal Victorian Order (KCVO) in 1947 for his services to the King Edward's Hospital Fund, of which he had been honorary secretary since 1941. During the Second World War he chaired the committee for the allocation of medical manpower. From 1946 to 1948 he was chairman of the British Medical Association during the creation of the National Health Service.

== Early life and education ==
Lett was born in Waddingham, Lincolnshire, the eldest of eight children of local general practitioner Richard Alfred Lett and his wife Bithiah (née Appleford). His younger sister, Phyllis, later became a famous contralto.

He was educated at Marlborough College and the University of Leeds and then trained as a doctor at the London Hospital from 1896. He returned to Leeds to graduate MBBCh in 1899 and became a Fellow of the Royal College of Surgeons (FRCS) in 1902, after passing the MRCS and LRCP.

== Career ==
He worked at the London Hospital, being appointed surgical registrar in 1902, assistant surgeon in 1905, surgeon in 1915, and later senior surgeon. He also served as lecturer in anatomy and clinical and operative surgery from 1909 to 1912. He was a general surgeon, but had a special interest in urology and headed the hospital's genito-urinary department for many years. In 1905 he published a study of the treatment of breast cancer by removal of the ovaries, one of the earliest studies in this field. At the outbreak of the First World War in 1914 he was commissioned into the Royal Army Medical Corps and served at the Anglo-American Hospital at Wimereux in France from 1914 to 1915, the Belgian field hospital at Veurne in 1915, and then in Egypt.

He resigned his commission in November 1916 with the rank of major and was appointed Commander of the Order of the British Empire (CBE) in January 1920, three years after being elected president of the Hunterian Society.

In December 1934 he retired from active surgery and became consulting surgeon to the London Hospital, effectively an honorary position. He served on the council of the Royal College of Surgeons of England from 1927 to 1943 and was president from 1938 to 1940, following which he was created a Baronet in 1941. He was also appointed Knight Commander of the Royal Victorian Order (KCVO) in 1947 for his services to the King Edward's Hospital Fund, of which he had been honorary secretary since 1941. During the Second World War he chaired the committee for the allocation of medical manpower. From 1946 to 1948 he was chairman of the British Medical Association, during the creation of the National Health Service. In 1932 he became president of the urology section of the Royal Society of Medicine, London.

== Personal and family ==
Lett married Helen (Nellie) Browne, daughter of the famous surgeon Sir Buckston Browne, in 1906; they had three daughters.

== Death ==
He died at his home at Walmer, Kent. As he had no sons, the baronetcy became extinct.

== Arms ==
Coat of arms of Hugh Lett

Crest
An antique lamp Or inflamed Proper between two wings Sable.
Escutcheon
Argent on a fess Gules between in chief a rod Aesculapius between two grenades Sable fired Proper and in base a harp of the third a lion passant Or.
Motto
Sic Luceat Lux

== Footnotes ==
Baronetage of the United Kingdom
New creation	Baronet (of Walmer); 1941–1964	Extinct
