= Uterine inversion =

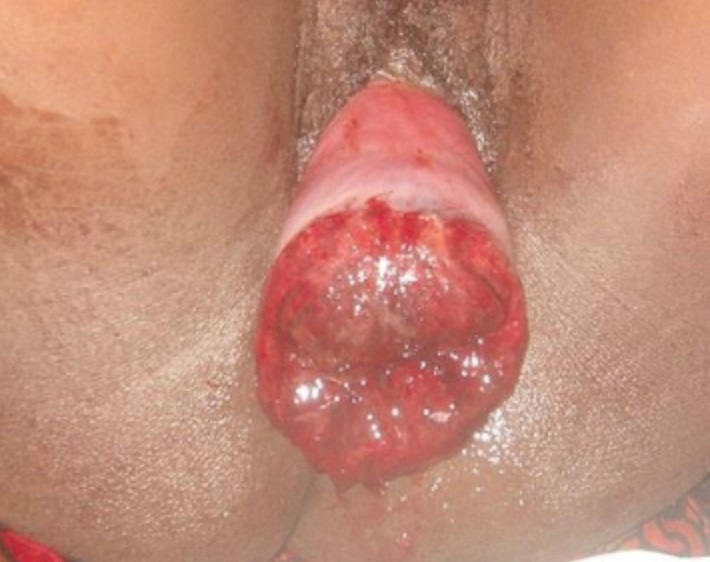
- Complete inverted uterus
- Specialty: Obstetrics
- Symptoms: Postpartum bleeding, abdominal pain, mass in the vagina, low blood pressure
- Types: First, second, third, fourth degree
- Risk factors: Pulling on the umbilical cord or pushing on the top of the uterus before the placenta has detached, uterine atony, placenta previa, connective tissue disorders
- Diagnostic method: Seeing the inside of the uterus in the vagina
- Differential diagnosis: Uterine fibroid, uterine atony, bleeding disorder, retained placenta
- Treatment: Standard resuscitation, rapidly replacing the uterus
- Medication: Oxytocin, antibiotics
- Prognosis: ~15% risk of death
- Frequency: About 1 in 6,000 deliveries

Uterine inversion is a rare and serious obstetric emergency in which the uterus turns inside out, usually following childbirth. Symptoms include postpartum bleeding, abdominal pain, a mass in the vagina, and low blood pressure. Rarely inversion may occur not in association with pregnancy.

Risk factors include pulling on the umbilical cord or pushing on the top of the uterus before the placenta has detached. Other risk factors include uterine atony, placenta previa, and connective tissue disorders. Diagnosis is by seeing the inside of the uterus either in or coming out of the vagina.

Treatment involves standard resuscitation together with replacing the uterus as rapidly as possible. If efforts at manual replacement are not successful surgery is required. After the uterus is replaced oxytocin and antibiotics are typically recommended. The placenta can then be removed if it is still attached.

Uterine inversion occurs in about 1 in 2,000 to 1 in 10,000 deliveries. Rates are higher in the developing world. The risk of death of the mother is about 15% while historically it has been as high as 80%. The condition has been described since at least 300 BC by Hippocrates.

== Signs and symptoms ==
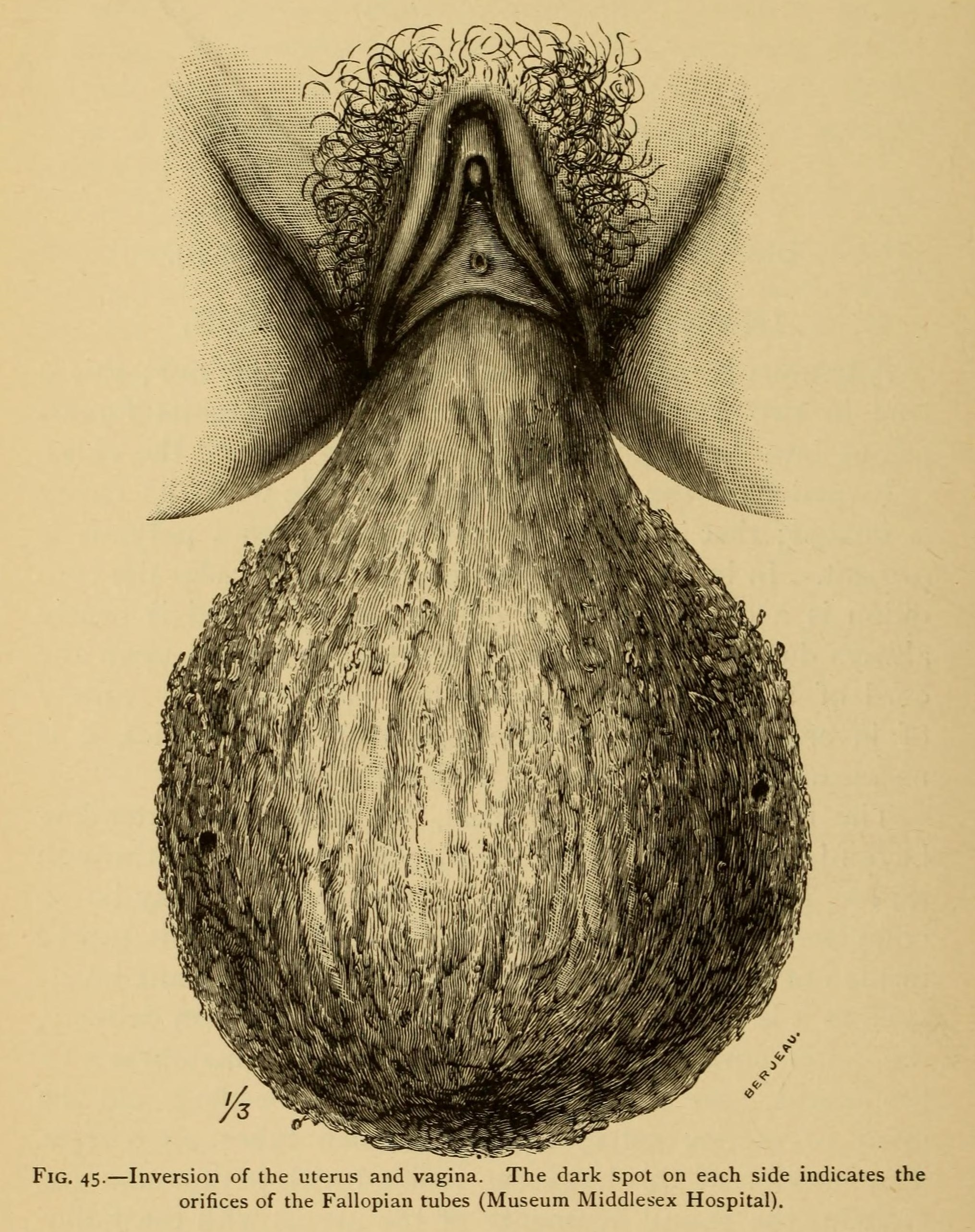
Drawing of an inverted uterus

Uterine inversion is often associated with significant postpartum bleeding. Traditionally it was thought that it presented with haemodynamic shock "out of proportion" with blood loss, however blood loss has often been underestimated. The parasympathetic effect of traction on the uterine ligaments may cause bradycardia.

== Causes ==
The most common cause is the mismanagement of 3rd stage of labor, such as:

- Fundal pressure
- Excess cord traction during the 3rd stage of labor

Other natural causes can be:

- Uterine weakness, congenital or not
- Precipitate delivery
- Short umbilical cord

It is more common in multiple gestation than in singleton pregnancies.

=== Associations ===
- Placenta praevia
- Fundal Placental Implantation
- Use of Magnesium Sulfate
- Vigorous fundal pressure
- Repeated cord traction
- short umbilical cord

== Types ==
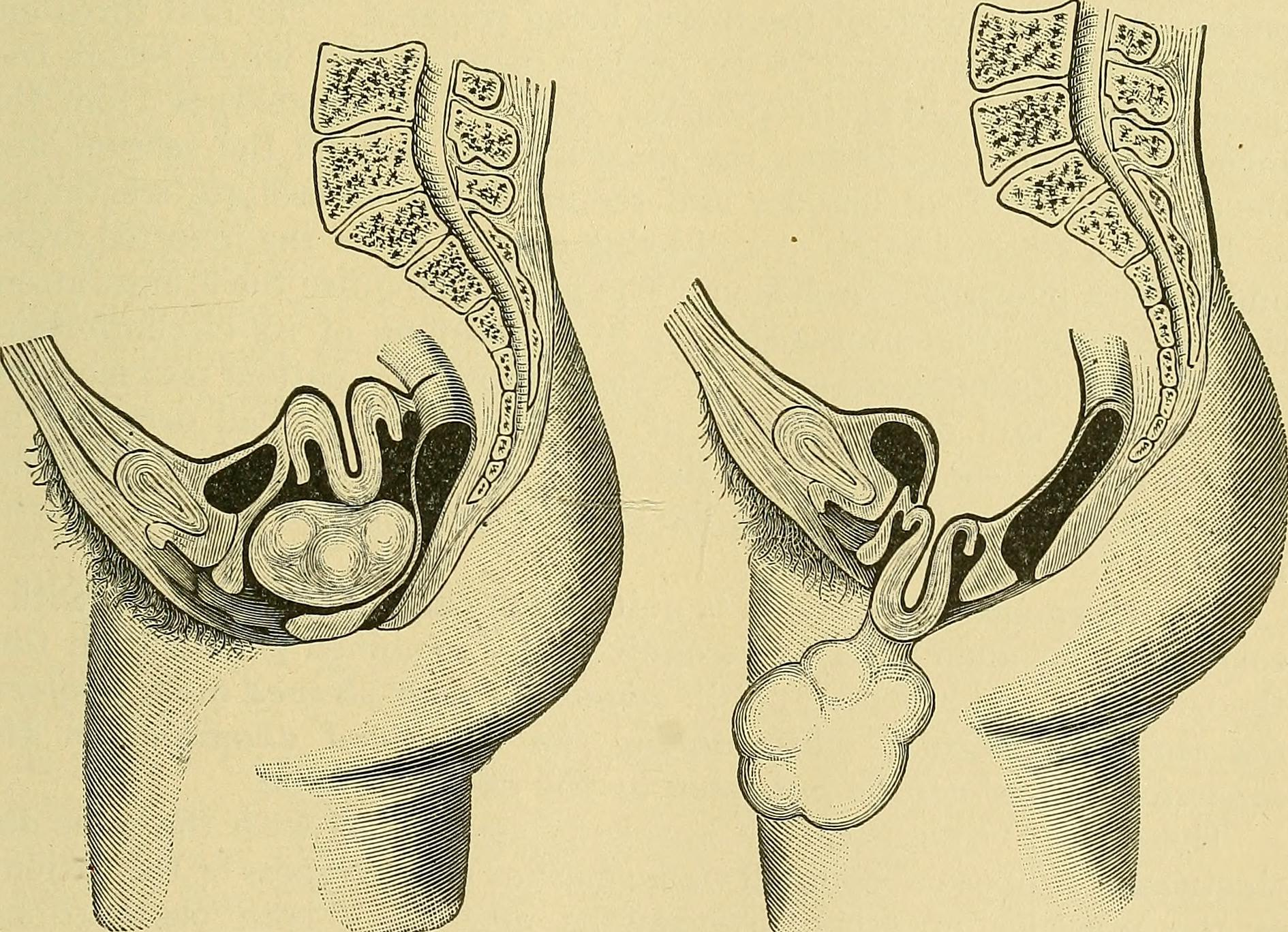
Incomplete (left) and complete (right) inversion of the uterus

- One: Complete. Visible outside the cervix.
- Two: Incomplete. Visible only at the cervix.

== Treatment ==
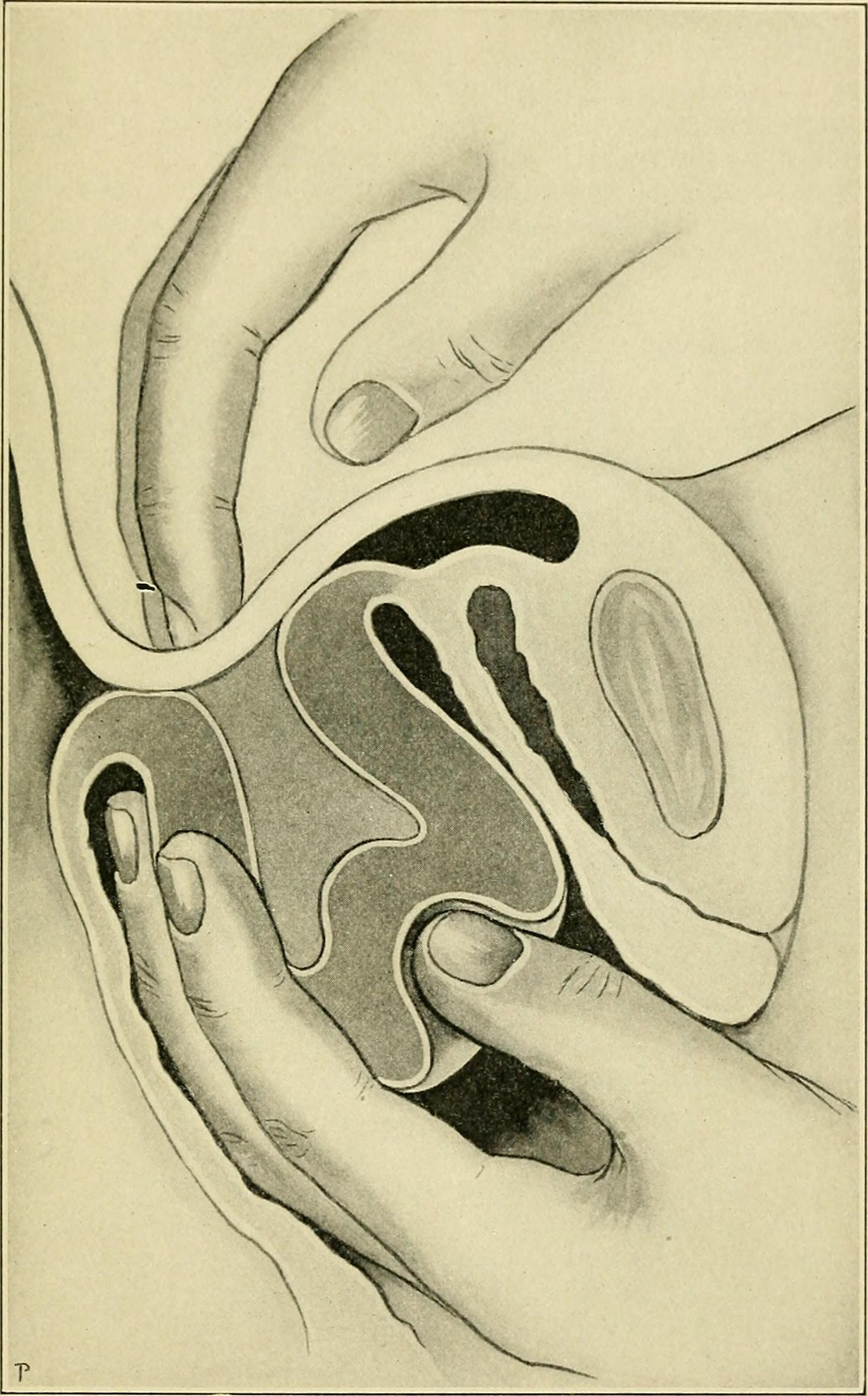
Manual replacement of the uterus

Treatment involves standard resuscitation together with replacing the uterus as rapidly as possible. If efforts at manual replacement are not successful surgery is required. After the uterus is replaced oxytocin and antibiotics are typically recommended. The placenta can then be removed if it is still attached.

== Epidemiology ==
Uterine inversion occurs in about 1 in 2,000 to 1 in 10,000 deliveries. Rates are higher in the developing world.
