= Edward Rigby (obstetrician) =

British obstetrician

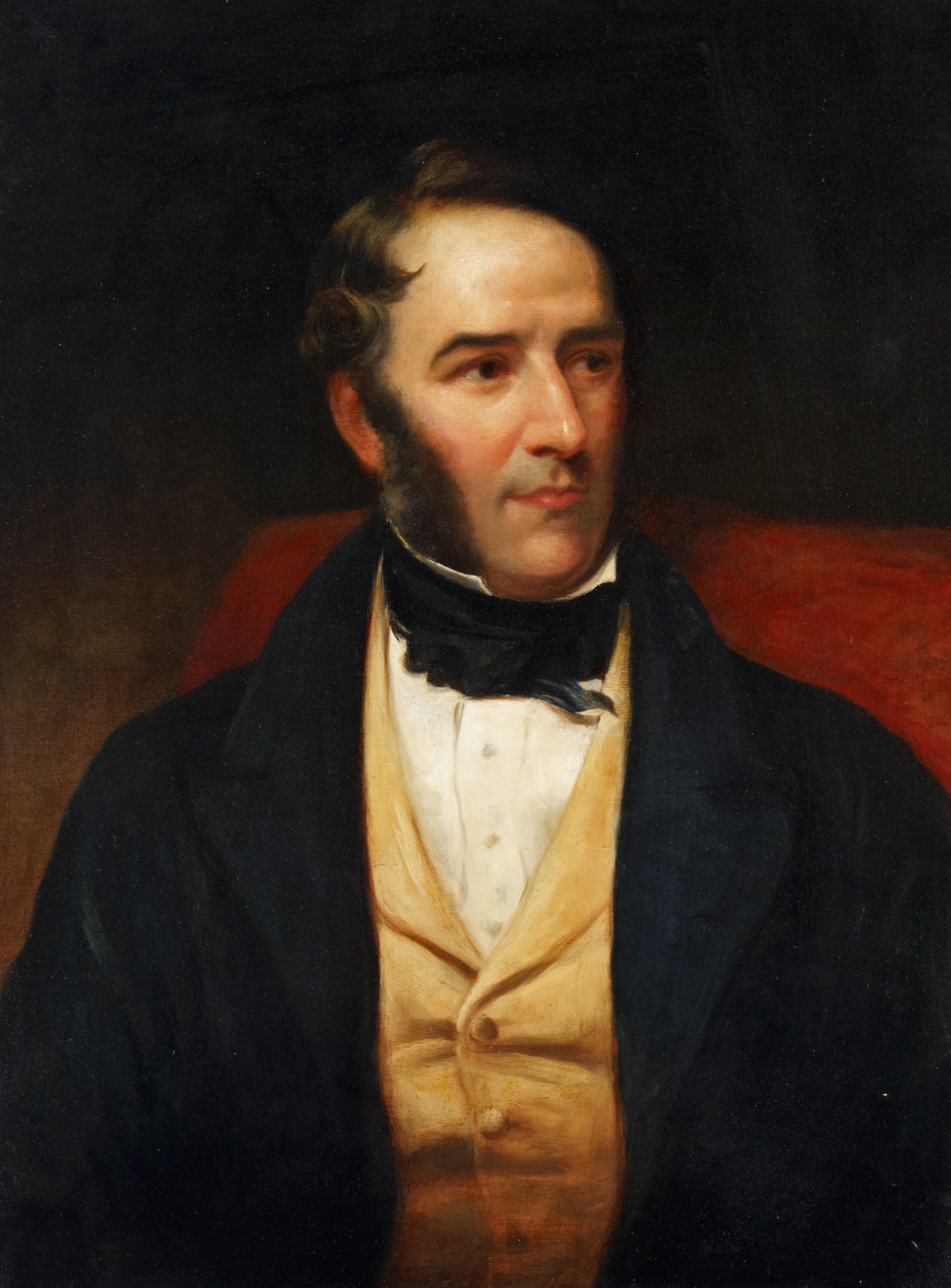
Edward Rigby

Edward Rigby (1804–1860) was an English obstetrician and medical writer, the first President of the Obstetrical Society of London.

== Life ==
The son of the physician Edward Rigby (1747–1821), he was born with a twin-sister on 1 August 1804. Educated at Norwich grammar school under Edward Valpy, he was a schoolfellow of Sir James Brooke and Sir Archdale Wilson. In 1821 he attended Norfolk and Norwich Hospital, and next year matriculated at Edinburgh University. He graduated M.D. 1 August 1825, on his twenty-first birthday which was the earliest age then possible.

After graduation Rigby spent some time in Dublin, and in 1826 went to Berlin University to study midwifery. From Berlin he moved on to Heidelberg University and Franz Naegele. In 1830 he became a house pupil at the General Lying-In Hospital, Lambeth in South London, where he went on to hold the appointments of junior and senior physician.

In 1831 Rigby was admitted a licentiate of the London College of Physicians, and in 1843 became a fellow. In 1831 he began to lecture on midwifery at St. Thomas's Hospital, and from 1838 to 1848 he lectured on the same subject at St. Bartholomew's Hospital. He was examiner in midwifery in London University from 1841 to 1860.

Rigby became regarded as the leading obstetric physician in London, when Sir Charles Locock retired from practice. When the Obstetrical Society was founded in 1859 he was elected its first president. He was a fellow of the Linnean Society, and a member of foreign medical societies. He died on 27 December 1860 at 35 Berkeley Square, London.

== Works ==
Rigby wrote:

- Memoranda for Young Practitioners in Midwifery, London, 1837; 4th edit. 1868.
- A System of Midwifery, forming vol. vi. of Alexander Tweedie's Library of Medicine, London, 1841.
- On Dysmenorrhœa, London, 1844.
- On the Constitutional Treatment of Female Diseases, London, 1857.

In 1830 Rigby translated Naegele's work On the Mechanism of Parturition. He also contributed "Midwifery Hospital Reports" to the Medical Gazette, and "Reports on Uterine Affections" to the Medical Times, and brought out the second edition (1843) of William Hunter's Anatomical Description of the Gravid Uterus.

== Family ==
Rigby married, in September 1838, Susan, second daughter of John Taylor. She died in 1841, leaving a daughter. He married secondly, in 1851, Marianne, eldest daughter of S. D. Darbishire of Pendyffrin, North Wales. She died in 1853, leaving two daughters.

== Notes ==
Attribution

This article incorporates text from a publication now in the public domain: Lee, Sidney, ed. (1896). "Rigby, Edward (1804-1860)". Dictionary of National Biography. Vol. 48. London: Smith, Elder & Co.
