= Edward Rigby (priest) =

Canadian Anglican priest

Edward Rigby was a Canadian Anglican priest in the 20th century.

Rigby was educated at the University of Toronto and ordained in 1938. After a curacy in Coboconk he was Rector of Omagh, Ontario, from 1941 to 1946; on the staff of the Diocese of Niagara from 1946 to 1963; and Archdeacon of Niagara from 1964 to 1973.
