= Henry Oldham =

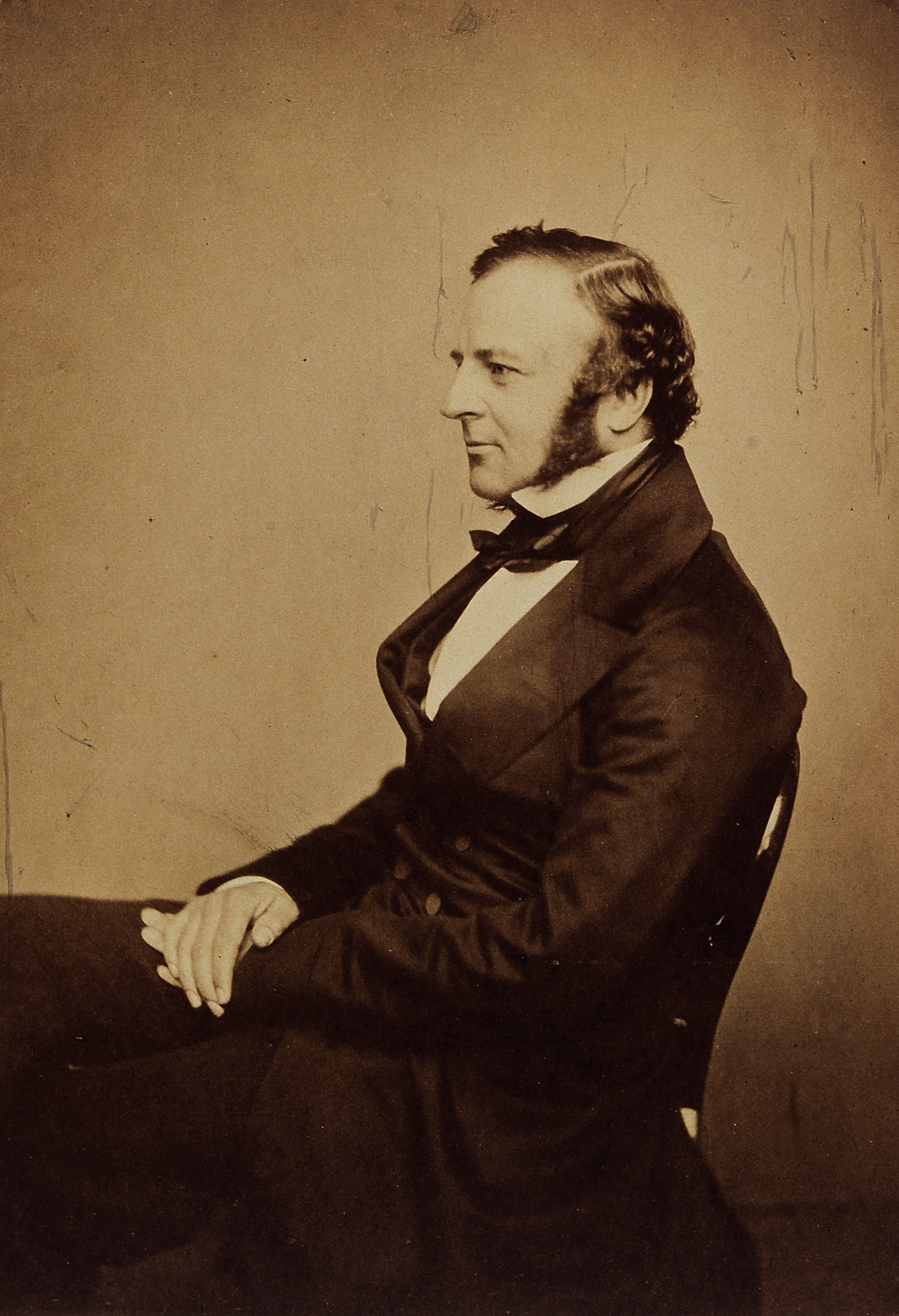
- Born: 31 January 1815; Tooting, England
- Died: 19 November 1902 or 3 December 1902; Boscombe, England
- Occupation: Obstetric physician

Henry Oldham (31 January 1815 – 1902) was an English obstetric physician and co-founder of the Obstetrical Society of London.

== Life ==
The sixth son and ninth child of Adam Oldham (1781–1839) of Balham, a solicitor, was born on 31 January 1815; his mother, Ann Lane, was a daughter of William Stubbington Penny, and Charles James Oldham (1843–1907) the university benefactor was a nephew. Educated at James Balaam's school at Clapham and at London University, entered in 1834 the medical school of Guy's Hospital. In May 1837 he became M.R.C.S. England; in September following a licentiate of the Society of Apothecaries; in 1843 a licentiate, and in 1857 fellow, of the Royal College of Physicians of London.

In 1849 Oldham was appointed, with J. C. W. Lever, physician-accoucheur and lecturer on midwifery and diseases of women at Guy's Hospital. He was pre-eminent as a lecturer, and proceeded M.D. at the University of St Andrews in 1858. After twenty years' service he became consulting obstetric physician.

Oldham had an extensive practice in the City of London, first at 13 Devonshire Square, Bishopsgate Street, and then at 25 Finsbury Square. About 1870 he moved to 4 Cavendish Place, and in 1899 retired to Bournemouth, where he died in 1902, being buried in the cemetery there. He was a vegetarian for the last 15 years of his life. His unique diet consisted of bread, butter, eggs, a milk pudding and coffee, cocoa and tea.

== Works ==
Before his appointment at Guy's Hospital, Oldham studied embryology in the developing chick by means of coloured injections and the microscope. He made 17 contributions to "Guy's Hospital Reports", besides writing four papers in the Transactions of the Obstetrical Society of London (of which he was one of the founders, an original trustee, and President in 1863–5). He invented the term "missed labour", that is, when the child dies in the womb and labour fails to come on; but the specimen on which he based his view was later differently interpreted. He also researched menstruation.

== Family ==
Oldham married in 1838 Sophia (died 1885), eldest daughter of James Smith of Peckham, and had six children, four daughters and two sons, of whom one died in infancy and the other was Colonel Sir Henry Hugh Oldham, C.V.O.

== Notes ==
Attribution

This article incorporates text from a publication now in the public domain: Lee, Sidney, ed. (1912). "Oldham, Henry". Dictionary of National Biography (2nd supplement). Vol. 3. London: Smith, Elder & Co.
