= William Blizard =

British surgeon

Sir William Blizard
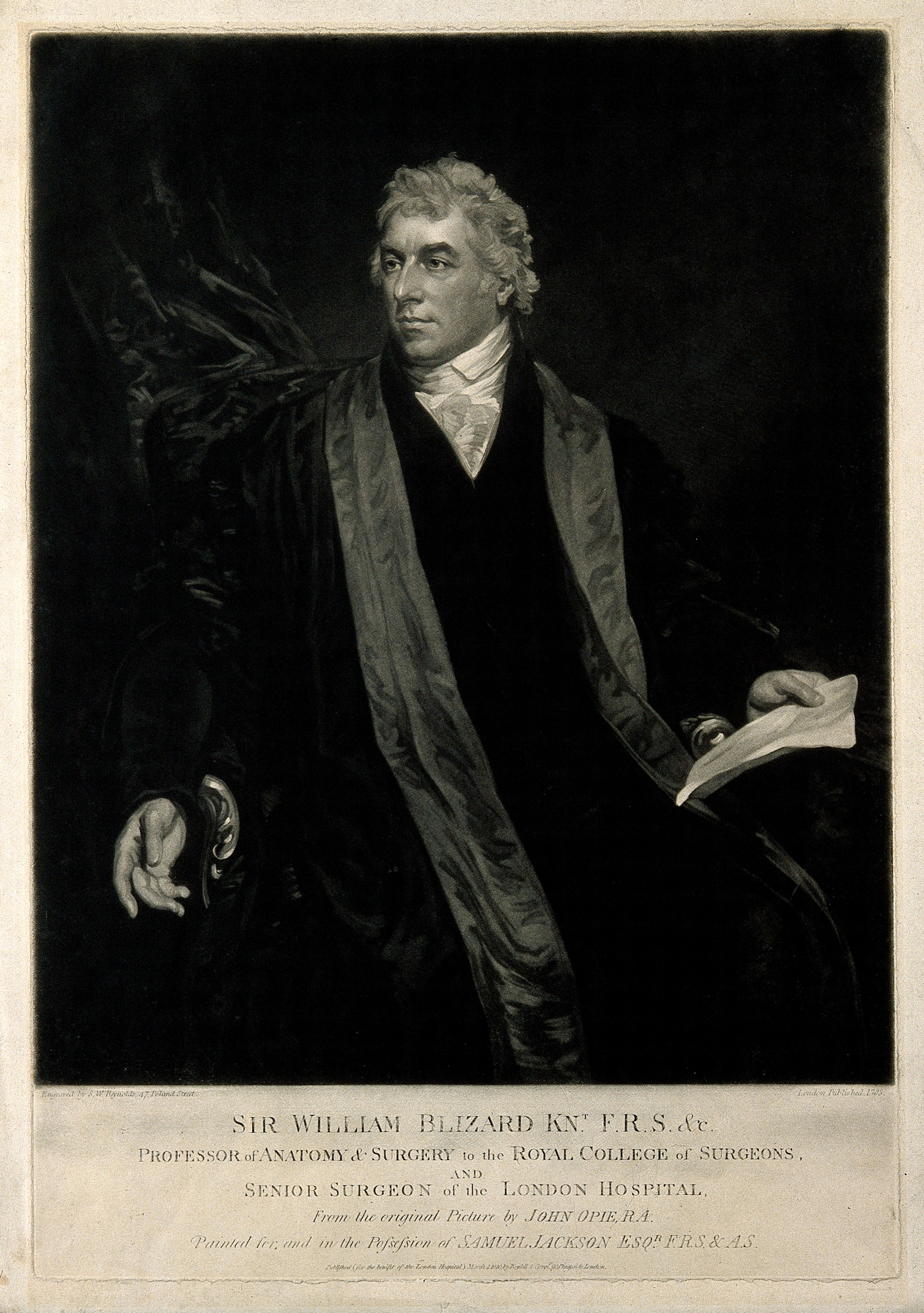
- Sir William Blizard. Mezzotint by S. W. Reynolds
- Born: 1 March 1743; Barn Elms, Surrey, England
- Died: 27 August 1835 (aged 92); Brixton Hill, London, England
- Resting place: Norwood Cemetery
- Occupation: Surgeon

Sir William Blizard FRS FRSE PRCS FSA (1 March 1743 – 27 August 1835) was an English surgeon.

== Life ==
He was born in Barn Elms, Surrey, the fourth child of auctioneer William Blizard. After an apprenticeship to a surgeon and apothecary in Mortlake he went to study at the London Hospital where he was a pupil of Sir Percivall Pott and John Hunter.

In 1780 he was appointed surgeon, and in 1785 founded with Dr McLaurin the medical school there, largely at his own expense. He also held public medical consultations at Batson's Coffee House in Cornhill. He was surgeon to the Duke and Duchess of Gloucester.

He was elected a fellow of the Royal Society in 1787. He worked for twenty years as a lecturer on surgery and anatomy at the Royal College of Surgeons and was their president twice (1814 and 1822) and Hunterian Orator three times (1813, 1823, and 1828). He also delivered the Croonian lecture there in 1809. In 1810 he delivered the Arris and Gale Lecture.

He was against child labour in the cotton industry mills.

He was the founder and first president of the Hunterian Society 1819–1822. He was knighted in 1803.

For the last 13 years of his life, he resided at Brixton Hill. After his death at the age of 92, he was buried in a vault beneath St Matthew's Church, Brixton. His remains were subsequently moved to Norwood Cemetery.

The surgeon Thomas Blizard FRSE (1772–1838) was his nephew and Thomas Blizard Curling was his great nephew.

The Blizard Building at Whitechapel is named after him.
