= William Henry Kelson =

English physician and writer

William Henry Kelson FRCS FZS (15 August 1862 – 24 January 1940) was an English physician and writer, President of the Hunterian Society, Fellow of the Royal College of Surgeons and of the Zoological Society of London.

== Early life ==
Kelson was born in London, the only son of William Henry Kelson, a shipbuilder, and his wife Ann Maria Perry, the grandson of Colonel Charles Kelson and great-grandson of Dr Thomas Mortimer Kelson of Sevenoaks in Kent. He had two sisters, Emily and Wilhelmina. He was educated at Gresham's School, Holt, and from 1880 at the London Hospital (now the Royal London Hospital), where he held the Letheby scholarship.

== Career ==
After qualifying as a surgeon, Kelson held hospital appointments. He was surgeon to the throat and ear department of the City Dispensary and also Consulting Surgeon to the London Throat, Nose, and Ear Hospital, in Golden Square.

He was elected as president of the Hunterian Society, as a member of Court of the Society of Apothecaries, as president of the Laryngological Section and as Honorary Secretary to the Otological and Laryngological Sections of the Royal Society of Medicine.

== Publications ==
- Handbook of Diseases of Throat, Nose and Ear (London, 1915)
- Essays on Laryngeal Diseases in Children
- Diseases of Upper Respiratory Tract in Relation to Life Assurance

== Personal life ==
In 1921, Kelson married Hilda Frances, younger daughter of Arthur W. Lane, of Ealing, but they had no children.

Kelson died on 24 January 1940 at St Ann's Heath, Virginia Water, Surrey.
