= Thomas Blizard Curling =

British surgeon (1811–1888)

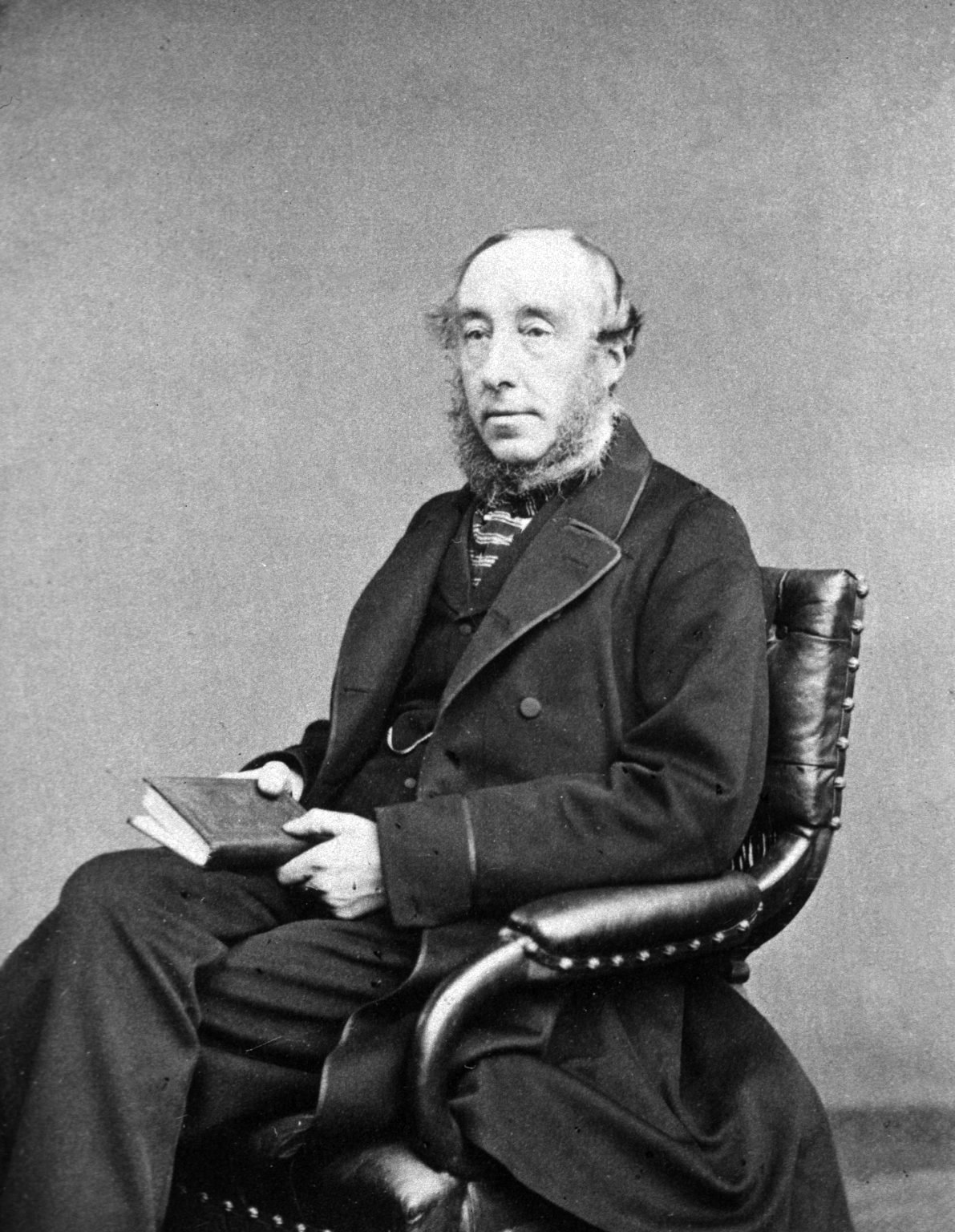
Thomas Blizard Curling

Thomas Blizard Curling (1811 – 4 March 1888) was a British surgeon.

He was born in Tavistock Place, London in 1811, the son of civil servant Daniel and Elizabeth (née Blizard) Curling and educated at Manor House, Chiswick. Without a degree but through the influence of his surgeon great uncle, Sir William Blizard, he became assistant-surgeon to the Royal London Hospital in 1833, becoming full surgeon in 1849. In 1834 he won the Jacksonian prize for his investigations on tetanus; and he became famous for his skill in treating diseases of the testes and rectum, his published works on which went through many editions. A stress ulcer resulting from burns is called a Curling's ulcer after him.

He was elected a Fellow of the Royal Society in June 1850. After filling other important posts in the College of Surgeons, he was appointed president of the College in 1873. In 1871, he was elected President of the Royal Medical and Chirurgical Society.

He died in Cannes, France on 4 March 1888.
