= Stephen Mackenzie =

English medical doctor (1844–1909)

Sir Stephen Mackenzie FRCP
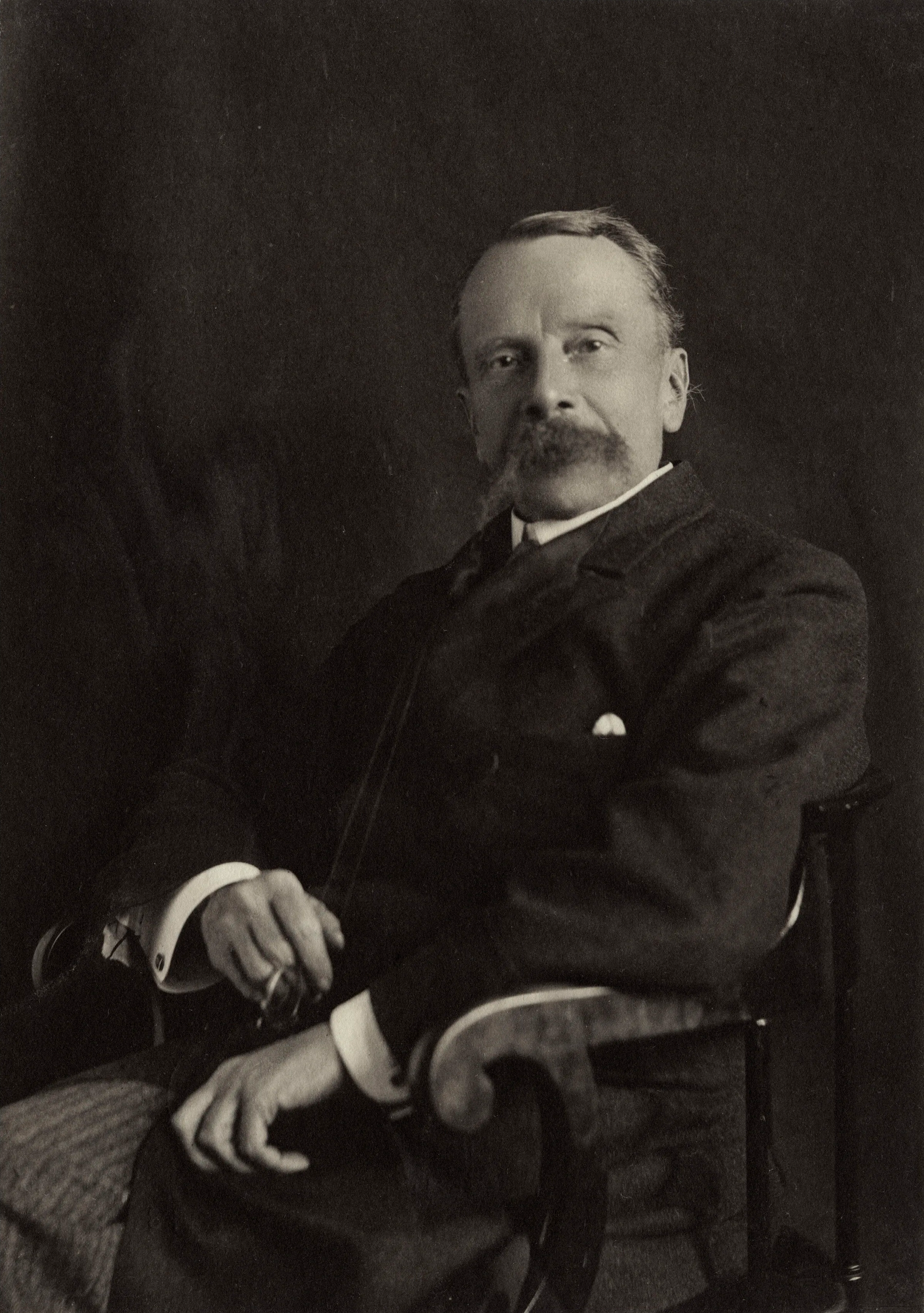
- Portrait by Olive Edis, c. 1900–1909
- Born: 14 October 1844; Leytonstone, Essex, England
- Died: 3 September 1909 (aged 64)
- Scientific career
- Fields: Physician

Sir Stephen Mackenzie FRCP (14 October 1844 – 3 September 1909) was a British physician, knighted in 1903.

== Life ==
Mackenzie had three brothers and five sisters, and was born at Leytonstone, Essex, England. He was a son of Stephen Mackenzie, a general practitioner and surgeon, a brother of the laryngologist Sir Morell Mackenzie, and a nephew of the actor Henry Compton. Stephen Mackenzie the younger was educated at Christ's Hospital in 1853–1859 and at the medical college of the London Hospital in 1866–1869 after medical apprenticeship to Dr. Benjamin Dulley, his eventual father-in-law. Mackenzie was a medical resident at the London Hospital and studied for a year at Aberdeen, where he became M.B. in 1873 and M.D. in 1875. After working in 1873 at the Charité Hospital connected with the University of Berlin, he returned to London in late 1873 and then spent the remainder of his career working as a physician at the London Hospital before retiring in 1905 due to health problems.

Mackenzie was distinguished not only as a general physician but for special knowledge of skin diseases, to which he made many original contributions, and of ophthalmology, which by his teaching he did much to introduce into general medicine. He was physician (1884-1905) and consulting physician to the London Ophthalmic (Moorfields) Hospital, and wrote on changes in the retina in diseases of the kidneys. In 1891 he delivered the Lettsomian lectures before the Medical Society of London on anaemia. He also made some original observations on the distribution of the filarial parasites in the blood of man in relation to sleep and rest. He employed glycerinated calf lymph for vaccination, thus reviving the practice instituted by Dr. Cheyne in 1853. He was knighted in 1903, and soon afterwards resigned his hospital appointments owing to increasing asthma.

Mackenzie wrote numerous articles for medical periodicals and for Quain's Dictionary of Medicine, Allbutt's System of Medicine, and Heath's Dictionary of Practical Surgery.
