= Archibald Billing =

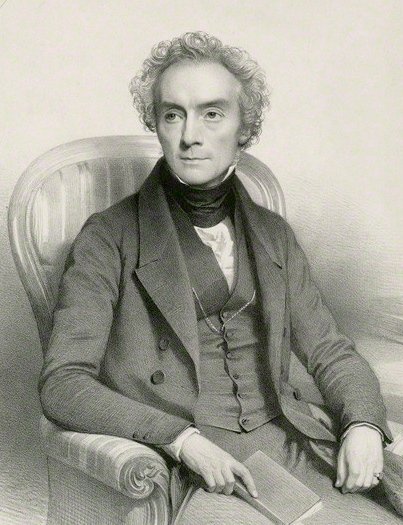
Archibald Billing by Charles Baugniet, 1846

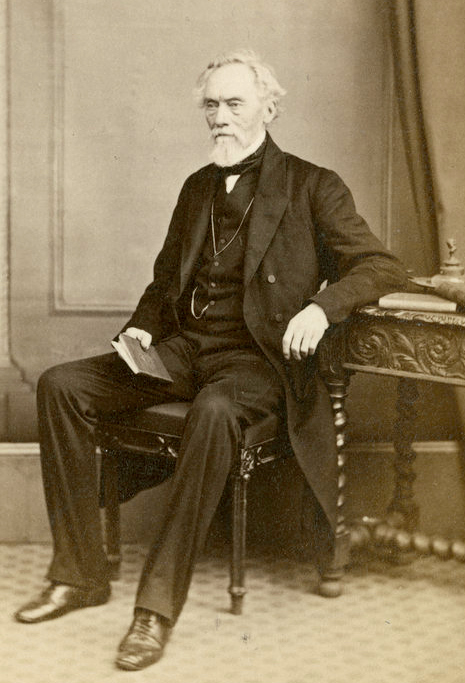
Archibald Billing in the 1860s

Archibald Billing FRS (10 January 1791 – 2 September 1881) was an English physician and writer on art.

== Biography ==
Billing was the son of Theodore Billing of Cromlyn, in the county of Dublin. He entered Trinity College Dublin, in 1807, graduated A.B. 1811, M.B. 1814, M.D. 1818, and was incorporated M.D. at Oxford on his Dublin degree on 22 October 1818. He says himself that he spent seven years in clinical study at Irish, British, and continental hospitals before he sought a fee, but about 1815 must have settled in London, was admitted candidate (member) of the College of Physicians on 22 December 1818, and fellow on 22 December 1819. He was censor of the college in 1823, and councillor from 1852 to 1855.

Billing was long connected with the London Hospital, to which foundation, after having been engaged in teaching there since 1817, he was elected physician on 2 July 1822. In 1823 he began a course of clinical lectures. He ceased to lecture in 1836, and resigned the post of physician on 4 June 1845. On the foundation of the university of London in 1836, Billing was invited to become a member of the senate, and occupied an influential position on that body for many years. He was also for a considerable time examiner in medicine. He was a Fellow of the Royal Society, and an active member of other scientific and medical societies.

After a long and distinguished professional career, Billing retired from practice many years before his death, which occurred on 2 September 1881 at his house in Park Lane. Perhaps the last London physician to visit his patients on horseback, he is buried in the Kensal Green Cemetery, London.

== Medical works ==
- First Principles of Medicine, 1st ed. 1831; 6th ed. 1868.
- On the Treatment of Asiatic Cholera, 1st ed. 1848.
- Practical Observations on Diseases of the Lungs and Heart, 1852.
- Clinical Lectures, published in the Lancet, 1831, and several papers in other medical journals.

Billing drew on his experience in a well-known manual, The First Principles of Medicine, which, from its first issue in 1831 that was hardly more than a pamphlet, grew to a bulky text-book. It ran to six editions. He restated them in the London Medical Gazette (1840, xxvi. 64), and also in his Practical Observations on Diseases of the Lungs and Heart, a work less successful than the Principles of Medicine.

== Interests and views ==
Billing began as a medical innovator, though came in the end to be conservative, and was opposed to what he regarded as the teachings of the German school. He gave special attention to diseases of the chest, and was among the earliest medical teachers in London to make auscultation part of regular instruction. His original views respecting the cause of the sounds of the heart were first put forth in 1832. His avowed aim was to base medicine on pathology; a lucid writer, he also stretched a point in favour of logical accuracy. He was a cultured man, with accomplishments not professional. He was an amateur artist, and a connoisseur in engraved gems and coins, and similar objects. On this area he published The Science of Gems, Jewels, Coins, and Medals, Ancient and Modern, 1867, which contained a fragmentary autobiography of Benedetto Pistrucci, translated by Billing's wife. An elaborate text-book, illustrated with photographs, it reached a second edition.

As a musical amateur, Billing on 12 May 1833 hosted in his home a trio of Mendelssohn, Paganini and the cellist Robert Lindley.
