= Benjamin Travers =

British surgeon (1783–1858)

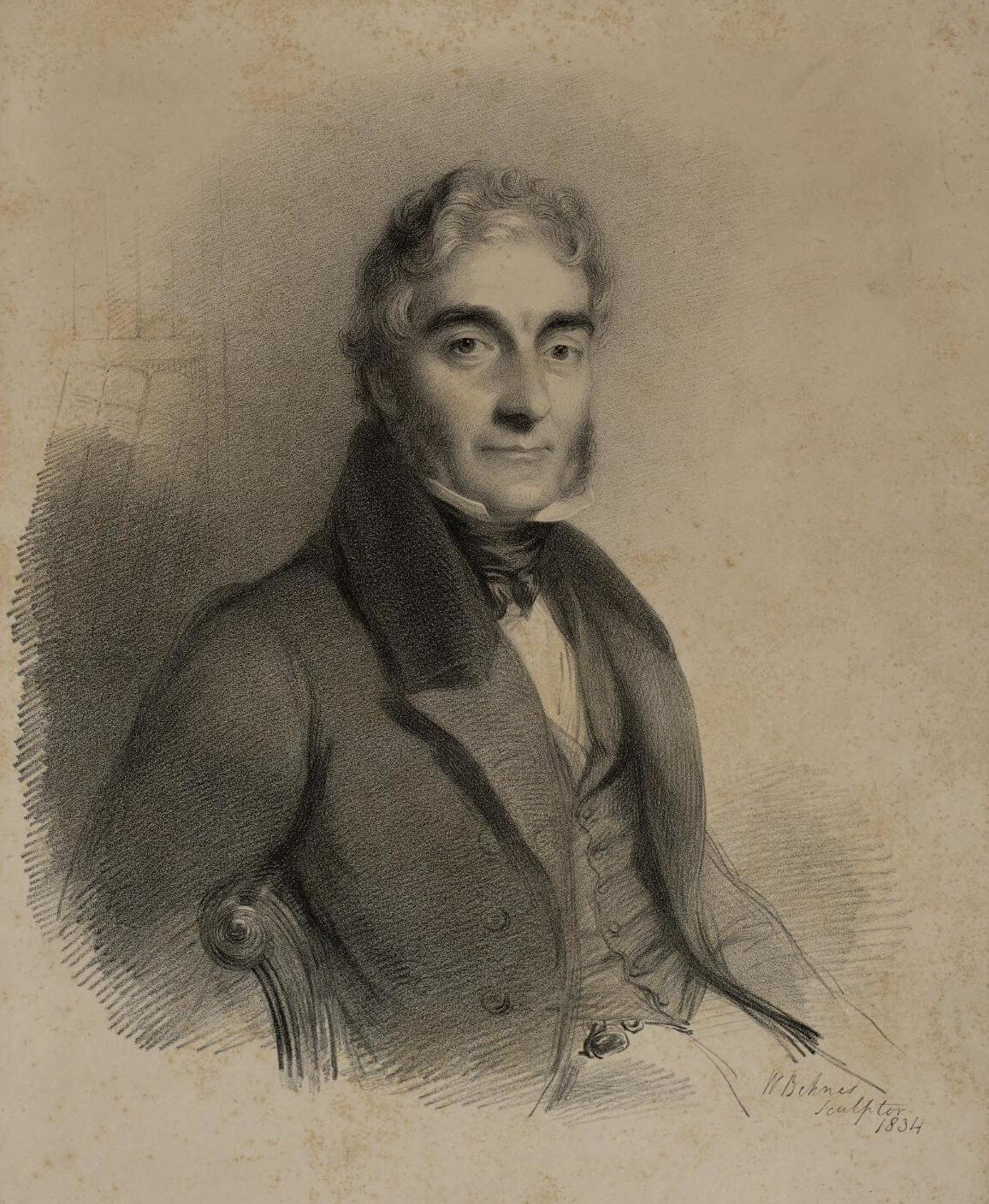
Portrait of Benjamin Travers

Benjamin Travers, FRS (3 April 1783 – 6 March 1858) was a British surgeon, known for his expertise in the physiology and morbidity of the eye. From 1857 to his death, he was the Serjeant Surgeon, a member of the Medical Household (part of the Royal Household).

== Life ==
Benjamin Travers was born on 3 April 1783 at Cheapside, London, the second of the ten children of Benjamin Travers, a London sugar broker, and his wife Mary Spilsbury. After Cheshunt Grammar School, he was educated privately before joining his father's counting house in 1799.

In August 1800, Travers was articled for six years to surgeon Astley Cooper. By 1807, he set up his own London practice and was appointed Demonstrator of Anatomy at Guy's Hospital. In 1810 he was appointed Surgeon to the London Infirmary for Diseases of the Eye, and afterwards to the Moorfields Ophthalmic Hospital, where he collaborated with William Lawrence. In May 1815, he was elected a Surgeon at St Thomas' Hospital where he served until his retirement in 1841. He also obtained the lucrative post of Surgeon to the East India Company's warehouses and brigade.

In 1836, he was awarded part of the £2482 16s 2d of compensation for the 199 enslaved people on the Marble Hill estate on Antigua, most likely as a trustee of Caroline Ottley (nee Travers), Benjamin's sister and the wife of the Rev. John Bridges Ottley (ne Hooker).

On the formation of the medical establishment of Queen Victoria he was appointed a Surgeon Extraordinary, afterwards becoming a Surgeon in Ordinary to the Prince Consort. He was appointed Serjeant Surgeon in 1857.

He was elected a Fellow of the Royal Society in 1813. He was President of the Hunterian Society in 1827 and served on their council from 1830 to 1858. He was their Hunterian Orator in 1838. He was also President of the Medical and Chirurgical Society of London in 1827.

He married three times. His first marriage in 1807 was to Sarah, daughter of William Morgan, FRS. His second marriage in 1813 a daughter of G. Millet, an East India director, and his third in 1831 was to the youngest daughter of Colonel Stevens. He had a large family, the eldest of whom was Benjamin. He died at his house in Green Street, Grosvenor Square, on 6 March 1858, and was buried at Hendon, Middlesex.

== Publications ==
- An Inquiry into the Process of Nature in Repairing Injuries of the Intestine, 8vo, London, 1812.
- A Synopsis of Diseases of the Eye and their Treatment, 8vo, London, 1820; 3rd ed., 1824; issued in New York, 1825.
- An Enquiry into that Disturbed State of the Vital Functions usually denominated Constitutional Irritation, 8vo, London, 1824.
- A Further Enquiry respecting Constitutional Irritation and the Pathology of the Nervous System, London, 1834
