= Charles Aston Key =

English surgeon (1793–1849)

Charles Aston Key (1793–1849) was an English surgeon, known for his work in cardiology.

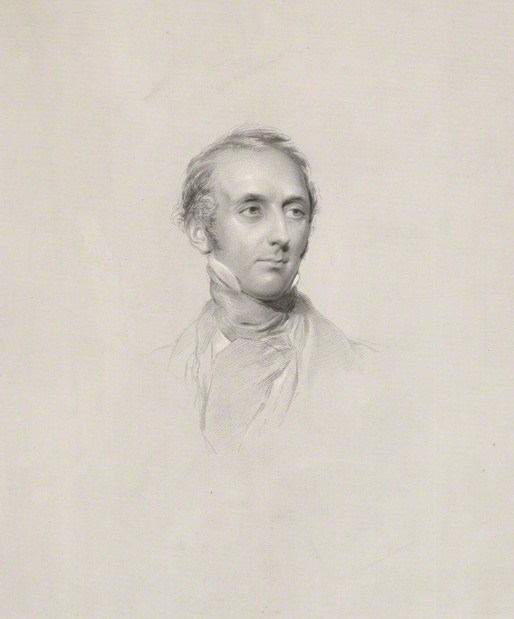
Charles Aston Key

== Life ==
Born in Southwark on 6 October 1793, he was eldest son of Thomas Key, a medical practitioner, and Margaret Barry; Thomas Hewitt Key was a half-brother by a second marriage. He was educated at Buntingford grammar school, in Hertfordshire, and was apprenticed to his father in 1810.

Key attended the lectures at the United Borough Hospitals in 1812, and became a pupil at Guy's Hospital in 1814. In 1815 his apprenticeship to his father was cancelled, and he became pupil of Astley Cooper, at a large cost, and in 1817–1818 he lived with Cooper. Key became demonstrator of anatomy at St. Thomas's Hospital, but resigned the post in February 1823, though he gave some of Cooper's surgical lectures for two sessions afterwards. he had qualified at the Royal College of Surgeons in 1821, and in the autumn of the same year was appointed the first assistant surgeon to Guy's, succeeding to a full surgeoncy in January 1824. In this year he introduced the operation for lithotomy with the straight staff, using only a single knife; the success of his operations established his reputation as a surgeon. He gained a large practice.

In 1825, on the separation of Guy's from St. Thomas's medical schools, Key was appointed lecturer on surgery at Guy's; he resigned the lectureship in 1844. In 1845 he was one of the first elected fellows of the Royal College of Surgeons, and in the same year became a member of its council.

In 1847 Key was appointed surgeon to Albert, Prince Consort. He died of cholera on 23 August 1849.

== Works ==
Key wrote:

- A Short Treatise on the Section of the Prostate Gland in Lithotomy, 4 plates, London, 1824.
- A Memoir on the Advantages and Practicability of Dividing the Stricture in Strangulated Hernia on the outside of the Sac, London, 1833;

He contributed to the Guy's Hospital Reports papers on hernia, lithotomy, and other subjects; and he edited the second edition of Sir Astley Cooper's work on hernia, 1827.

== Family ==
In 1818 Key married Cooper's niece, Anne Cooper. At his death he left nine children, including Astley Cooper Key.

== Notes ==
Attribution

This article incorporates text from a publication now in the public domain: Lee, Sidney, ed. (1892). "Key, Charles Aston". Dictionary of National Biography. Vol. 31. London: Smith, Elder & Co.
