= Robert Barnes (physician) =

English obstetric physician

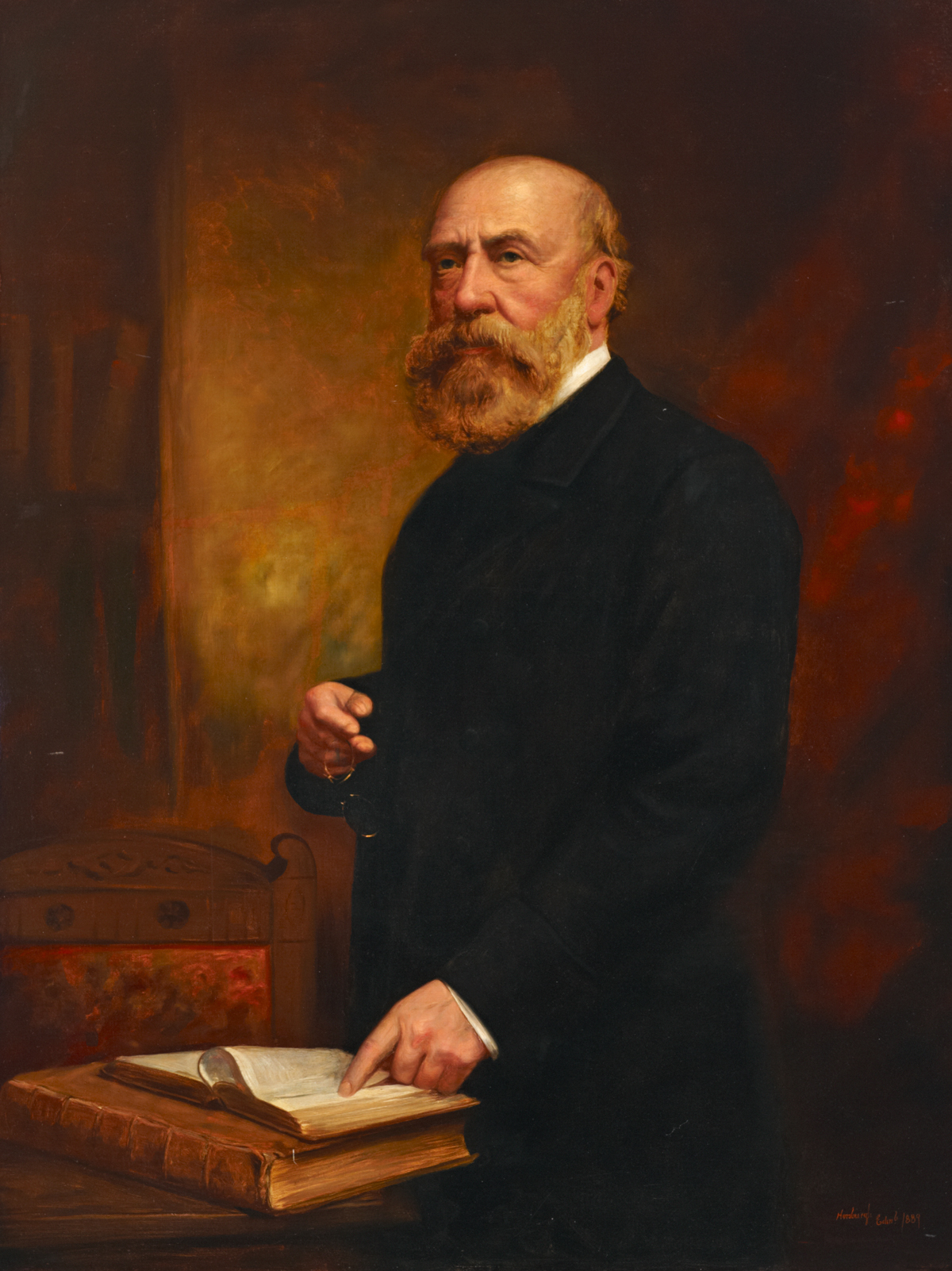
- Robert Barnes, 1889 portrait
- Born: 4 September 1817; Norwich, England
- Died: 12 May 1907 (aged 89); Eastbourne, England
- Occupations: physician, gynaecologist

Robert Barnes (4 September 1817 – 12 May 1907) was an English obstetric physician, known as a gynaecologist, teacher, author and medical politician.

== Life ==
Born at Norwich on 4 September 1817, he was second son and second child of the six children of Philip Barnes, an architect, by his wife Harriet Futter, daughter of a Norfolk squire. Educated at Bruges from 1826 to 1830 and at home, where one of his tutors was George Borrow, Barnes began his medical career in 1832 as an apprentice in Norwich to Dr. Richard Griffin. When his family moved to London he studied at University College, the Windmill Street school, and at St. George's Hospital.

Becoming a member of the Royal College of Surgeons in 1842, Barnes spent a year in Paris, where he concentrated on mental illness; on his return to London he settled in general practice in Notting Hill. His ambition at this point was to become a medical teacher: he lectured at the Hunterian School of Medicine and on forensic medicine at Dermott's School, and was obstetric surgeon to the Western general dispensary. He graduated M.D. London in 1848, and in 1853 became L.R.C.P. and in 1859 F.R.C.P.

On 1 April 1859, Barnes was elected assistant obstetric physician, and on 14 July 1863 obstetric physician, to the London Hospital. He moved on 24 April 1865 to a similar post at St. Thomas's Hospital, where he had lectured on midwifery since April 1862. In 1875, he left St. Thomas's Hospital, where he was dean of the medical school, to become obstetric physician at St. George's Hospital; there he was elected consulting obstetric physician in 1885. He had also acted as physician to the Seamen's Hospital, the East London Hospital for Children, and the Royal Maternity Hospital.

Barnes took a prominent part in founding the Obstetrical Society of London in 1858 and was president in 1865–6. But a dispute with the council of this society led him in 1884 to establish the British Gynæcological Society, of which he was honorary president until his death. The older society was hostile to the performance of ovariotomy and other operations by obstetricians. Barnes was one of the pioneers of operative gynæcology, and prevailed: the two societies were united in the obstetrical and gynæcological section of the Royal Society of Medicine in 1907.

At the London College of Physicians Barnes delivered the Lumleian lectures On Convulsive Diseases in Women in 1873 and was censor (1877–8). He was elected honorary fellow of the Royal College of Surgeons in 1883; of the Medical Society of London in 1893 (he had given the Lettsomian lectures in 1858), and of the Royal Medical and Chirurgical Society at the centenary meeting of 1905.

A leading teacher and gynæcologist in London, Barnes was a rival of James Matthews Duncan both in debates at the Obstetrical Society, and in practice. He was also a director of the Prudential Assurance Company (1848–9; 1884–1907), amassed a fortune, and gave to medical institutions including St. George's Hospital, where the pathological laboratory was called after him. He died at Eastbourne on 12 May 1907, and was buried there.

== Works ==
Barnes was author of:

- Obstetrical Operations, 1870; 3rd ed. 1876; translated into French.
- Medical and Surgical Diseases of Women, 1873; translated into French.
- Obstetric Medicine and Surgery, 2 vols. (with his son, Fancourt Barnes), 1884.
- Causes of Puerperal Fever, 1887.

In early life Barnes contributed to The Lancet. He wrote also 32 papers in the Transactions of the Obstetrical Society, and an official report on scurvy at the Seamen's Hospital, 1864.

== Family ==
Barnes married:

1. Eliza Fawkener, daughter of a London solicitor; and
2. Alice Maria, daughter of Captain W. G. Hughes, of Carmarthenshire, D.L. and J.P. for that county.

By his first wife he had one son, Dr. R. S. Fancourt Barnes, and two daughters, and by his second wife one son and one daughter.

== Notes ==
Attribution

This article incorporates text from a publication now in the public domain: Lee, Sidney, ed. (1912). "Barnes, Robert". Dictionary of National Biography (2nd supplement). Vol. 1. London: Smith, Elder & Co.
