= Hunterian Oration =

Lecture of the Royal College of Surgeons of England

The Hunterian Oration is a lecture of the Royal College of Surgeons of England, named in honour of pioneering surgeon John Hunter and held on his birthday, 14 February, each year.

== History ==
The oration was founded in 1813 by the executors of the will of surgeon John Hunter, his nephew Dr Matthew Baillie, and his brother-in-law Sir Everard Home, who made a gift to the Royal College of Surgeons of England to provide an annual oration and a dinner for Members of the Court of Assistants and others.

In 1853, the oration and dinner became biennial; it is held on alternate years in rotation with the Bradshaw Lecture. Delivered by a Fellow or Member of the college on 14 February, Hunter's birthday, "such oration to be expressive of the merits in comparative anatomy, physiology, and surgery, not only of John Hunter, but also of all persons, as should be from time to time deceased, whose labours have contributed to the improvement or extension of surgical science".

The RCS Oration is not to be confused with the Hunterian Society Oration given at the Hunterian Society.

== Orators ==
=== 19th century ===
- 1813 Sir William Blizard
- 1814 Everard Home
- 1815 John Percival Pott
- 1816 Henry Cline
- 1817 William Norris
- 1818 Sir David Dundas, 1st Baronet
- 1819 John Abernethy
- 1820 Sir Anthony Carlisle
- 1821 Thomas Chevalier
- 1822 Everard Home In Honour of Surgery
- 1823 Sir William Blizard
- 1824 Henry Cline
- 1825 William Norris
- 1826 Sir Anthony Carlisle on Oysters
- 1827 Honoratus Leigh Thomas
- 1828 Sir William Blizard
- 1829 John Painter Vincent, Observations on Some Parts of Surgical Practice
- 1830 George James Guthrie
- 1831 Anthony White
- 1832 Samuel Cooper
- 1833 John Howship
- 1834 Sir William Lawrence
- 1835
- 1837 Sir Benjamin Collins Brodie
- 1838 Benjamin Travers
- 1839 Edward Stanley
- 1840 Joseph Henry Green, Vital Dynamics
- 1841 Richard Dugard Grainger
- 1842 George Gisborne Babington
- 1843 James Moncrieff Arnott
- 1844 John Flint South on the History of Medicine
- 1845 Jordan Roche Lynch
- 1846 Sir William Lawrence
- 1847 Joseph Henry Green, Mental Dynamics, or Groundwork of a professional education
- 1848 Richard Dugard Grainger, The Cultivation of Organic Science
- 1849 Caesar Hawkins
- 1850 Frederic Carpenter Skey
- 1851 Richard Anthony Stafford (not delivered due to illness)
- 1852 James Luke
- 1853 Bransby Blake Cooper
- 1855 Joseph Hodgson
- 1857 Thomas Wormald
- 1859 John Bishop
- 1861 William Coulson
- 1863 George Gulliver on William Hewson and John Quekett as discoverers.
- 1865 Richard Partridge
- 1867 John Hilton
- 1869 Richard Quain, On some Defects in General Education
- 1871 Sir William Fergusson
- 1873 Henry Hancock
- 1875 Frederick Le Gros Clark
- 1877 Sir James Paget, Science in Surgery
- 1879 Sir George Murray Humphry
- 1881 Luther Holden
- 1883 Thomas Spencer Wells
- 1885 John Marshall
- 1887 William Scovell Savory, Surgery in its Relation to Science
- 1889 Henry Power
- 1891 Sir Jonathan Hutchinson
- 1893 Thomas Bryant, 100th Anniversary of John Hunter's Death
- 1895 John Whitaker Hulke. John Hunter, The Biologist
- 1897 Christopher Heath, John Hunter Considered as a Great Surgeon
- 1899 Sir William MacCormac

=== 20th century ===
- 1901 Nottidge Charles MacNamara, The Human Skull in Relation to Brain Growth
- 1903 Sir Henry Howse
- 1905 Sir John Tweedy
- 1907 Sir Henry T. Butlin, Objects of Hunter's Life and the Manner in which he Accomplished them
- 1909 Sir Henry Morris, John Hunter as a Philosopher
- 1911 Edmund Owen, John Hunter and his Museum
- 1913 Sir Rickman Godlee, On Hunter and Lister, and on the Museum of the Royal College of Surgeons of England
- 1915 Sir William Watson Cheyne, The Treatment of Wounds in War
- 1917 Sir George Henry Makins, The Influence Exerted by the Military Experience of John Hunter on himself and the Military Surgeon of Today
- 1919 Sir Anthony Bowlby, British Military Surgery in the time of Hunter and in the Great War
- 1921 Sir Charters J. Symonds, On Astley Cooper and Hunterian Principles
- 1923 Sir John Bland-Sutton, John Hunter, his affairs, habits and opinions
- 1925 D'Arcy Power, John Hunter as a Man
- 1927 Berkeley Moynihan, Hunter’s ideals and Lister’s practice
- 1928 Sir Holburt Waring, The Progress of Surgery from Hunter's day to ours
- 1929 A. W. Sheen, Some Aspects of the Surgery of the Spleen
- 1930 Ernest W. Hey Groves, Hero Worship in Surgery
- 1932 Wilfred Trotter, The Commemoration of Great Men
- 1934 Cuthert Sidney Wallace, Medical Education, 1760-1934
- 1936 Charles Herbert Fagge, John Hunter to John Hilton
- 1938 Eric Riches
- 1939 Sampson Handley, Makers of John Hunter
- 1941 Arthur Henry Burgess, Development of Provincial Medical Education Illustrated in the Life and Work of Charles White of Manchester
- 1942 Eric Riches
- 1943 William Francis Victor Bonney, The Forces behind Specialism in Surgery
- 1945 George Grey Turner, The Hunterian Museum, yesterday and to-morrow
- 1949 Henry S. Souttar, John Hunter the Observer
- 1951 Sir Max Page, The Hunterian Heritage
- 1953 Lionel E. C. Norbury, The Hunterian Era: Its Influence on the Art and Science of Surgery
- 1956 Sir Henry Cohen, Reflections on the Hunterian Method
- 1957 Ernest Finch, The influence of the Hunters on medical education
- 1959 Sir Reginald Watson-Jones, Surgery is Destined to the Practice of Medicine
- 1961 Russell Brock, Baron Brock on the Museum, Research and Inspiration of Hunter
- 1963 Sir Stanford Cade, The Lasting Dynamism of John Hunter
- 1965 A. Dickson Wright, John Hunter's Private Practice
- 1967 Arthur Porritt, Baron Porritt, John Hunter, Distant Echoes
- 1969 Leslie Norman Pyrah, John Hunter and After
- 1971 Sir Hedley Atkins, The Attributes of Genius from Newton to Darwin
- 1973 Sir Thomas Holmes Sellors, Some Pupils of John Hunter
- 1975 Sir Rodney Smith, The Hunters and the Arts
- 1977 Richard Harrington Franklin, John Hunter and his relevance in 1977
- 1978 (250th anniversary): John Wolfenden, Baron Wolfenden, Hunter, Hippocrates and Humanity
- 1979 George Qvist, Some controversial aspects of John Hunter's life and work.
- 1981 Sir Reginald Sydney Murley, Peace and strife in Hunter's time
- 1983 Not given due to death of speaker (Sir Alan Parks)
- 1984 Anthony John Harding Rains, The continuing message
- 1985 Donald Campbell
- 1986 Peter John Ryan, Two Kinds of Diverticular Disease
- 1987 Sir Geoffrey Slaney
- 1989 Sir Roy Calne
- 1991 John Blandy
- 1993 Sir Miles Horsfall Irving (born 1935, professor of surgery at the University of Manchester)
- 1995 John Alexander-Williams
- 1997 H. Brendan Devlin
- 1999 Jack Hardcastle

=== 21st century ===
- 2001 Bill Heald
- 2003 Charles S. B. Galasko, Hunter's Legacy and Surgical Training and Competence in the 21st Century
- 2005 Sir Peter Morris
- 2007 Anthony Mundy
- 2009 Linda de Cossart
- 2010 Simon Chaplin
- 2011 Norman Stanley Williams
- 2013 Sir Bruce E. Keogh
- 2015 Martin Elliott
- 2017 Lord Ara Darzi
- 2019 Patrick Ronan O'Connell

== See also ==
- Fitzpatrick Lecture
- Goulstonian Lecture
- Harveian Oration
- Lumleian Lectures
- Milroy Lectures
