= Fagge (surname) =

Fagge is a surname. Notable people with the surname include:

- Charles Hilton Fagge (1838–1883), English physician
- Charles Herbert Fagge (1873–1939), English surgeon
- Frederick Fagge (1814–1884), English cricketer and priest
- Sir John Fagge, 1st Baronet (1627–1701), English politician
- Sir Robert Fagge, 2nd Baronet (c.1649–1715), English politician
- Sir Robert Fagge, 3rd Baronet (1673–1736), English politician
