= Richard Dugard Grainger =

English surgeon, anatomist and physiologist (1801–1865)

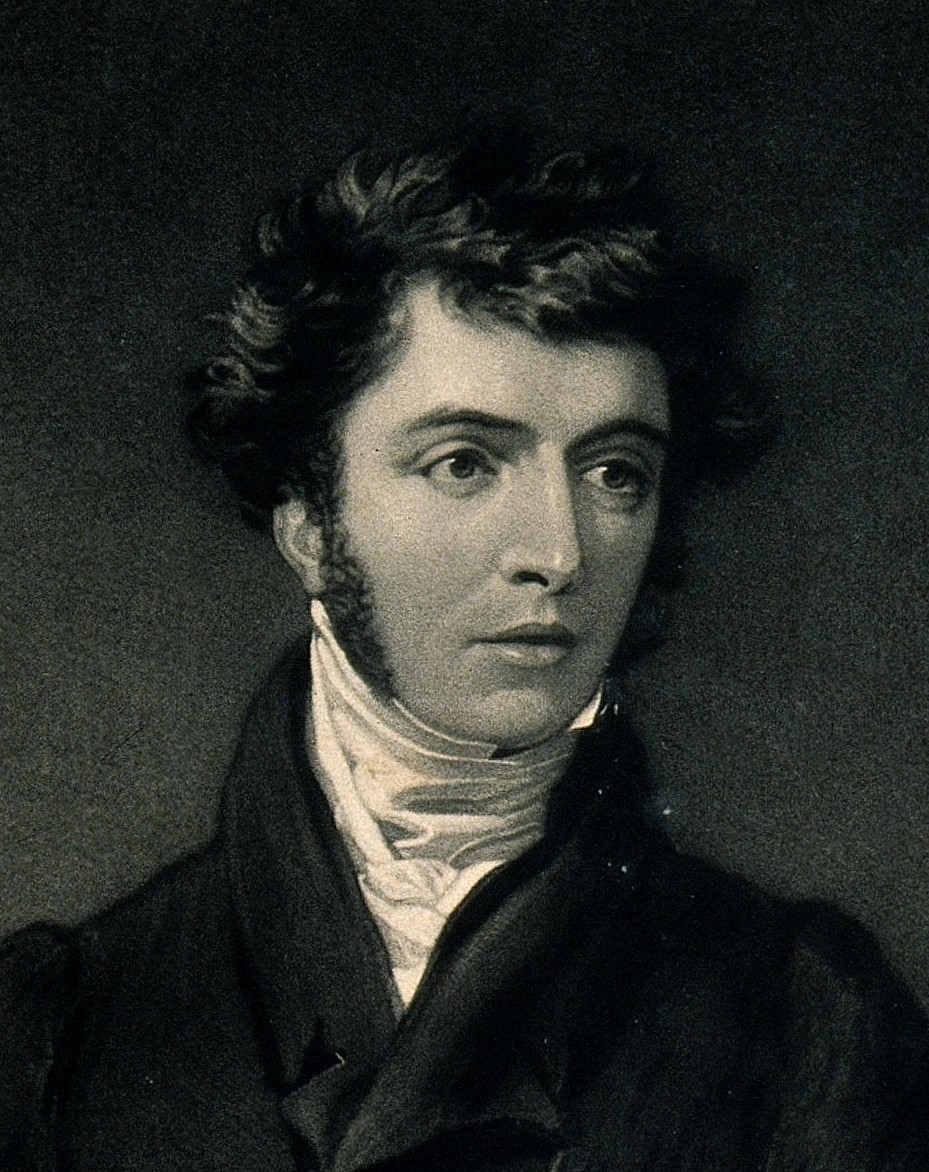
Richard D. Grainger

Richard Dugard Grainger FRCS FRS (1801 – 1 February 1865) was an English surgeon, anatomist and physiologist.

Grainger was born in Birmingham, the son of a surgeon, and educated at a grammar school. He was the brother of Edward Grainger, whose anatomical school he carried forward. He ran the private Webb Street anatomy school for twenty years before joining St Thomas's Hospital as a lecturer from 1842 to 1860.

He was elected a Fellow of the Royal College of Surgeons of England and delivered their Hunterian oration in 1848. He was an inspector for the Children's Employment Commission (1841), the Board of Health (1849), author of a report on cholera (1850) and inspector under the Burials Act 1853. Grainger refused money from a testimonial, which was then used to found the Grainger prize. He was the author of Elements of general anatomy (1829) and Observations on... the spinal cord (1837).

He was elected a Fellow of the Royal Society in January 1846 for his work on the spinal cord, which supported Marshall Hall's work on the reflex arc. His application citation read: The Discoverer of the structure of the Fallopian Tube in Mammalia. The Author of Observations on the Structure & Functions of the Spinal Cord, &c. Distinguished for his acquaintance with the science of physiology. Eminent as a Physiologist.

A tall, stooping man, he was a medical and social reformer, and was active in the Christian Medical Association.
