= Royal College of Surgeons of England =

Professional body in England, United Kingdom

Coordinates: 51°30′55″N 0°6′57″W

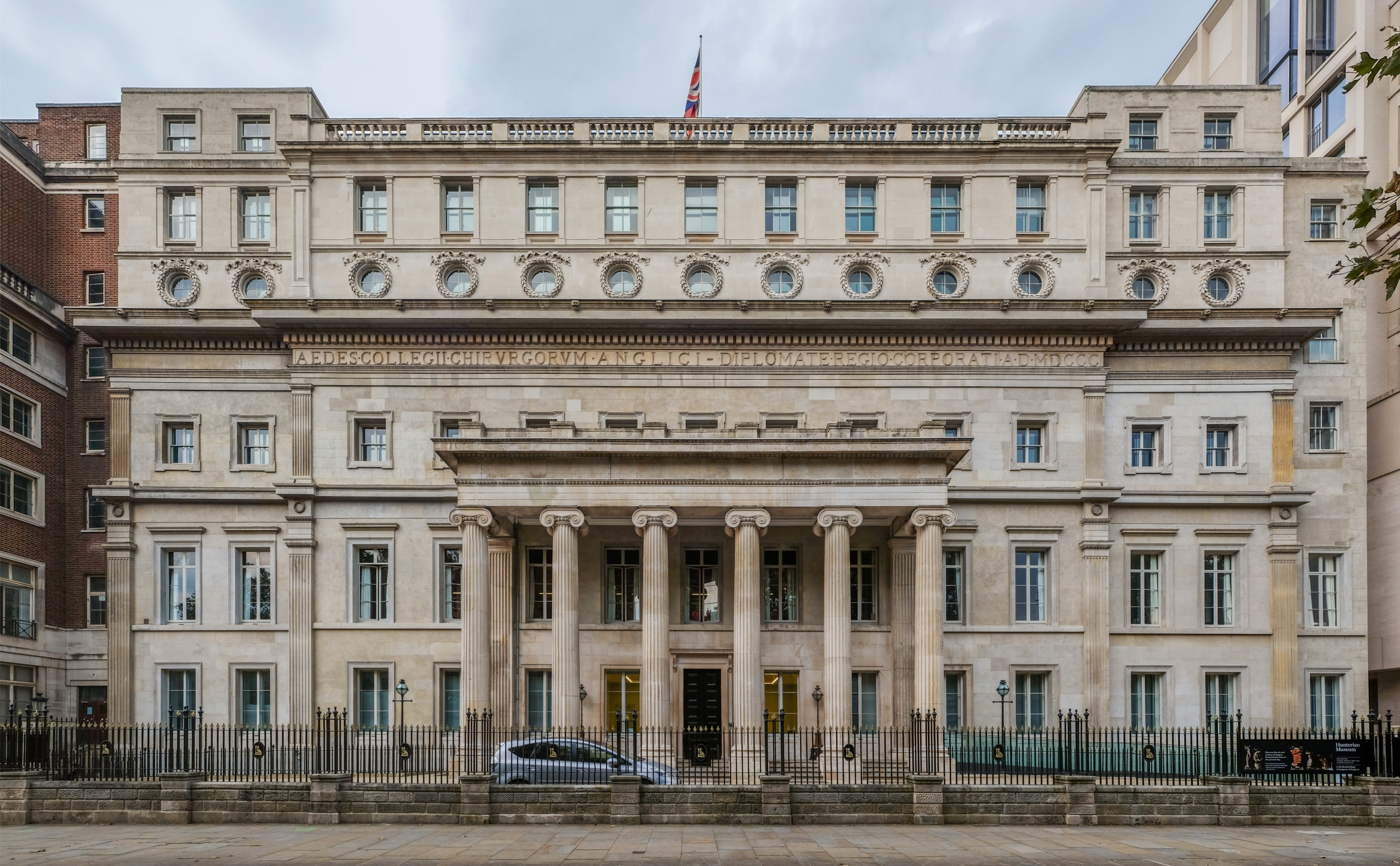
- Organisation headquarters in Lincoln's Inn Fields, London
- Established: 1800; 226 years ago
- Type: Medical royal college
- Headquarters: Lincoln's Inn Fields, London, England
- Members: 27,753 (2021)
- President: Timothy Mitchell
- Affiliations: Academy of Medical Royal Colleges
- Staff: 228 (2021)
- Website: www.rcseng.ac.uk

The Royal College of Surgeons of England (RCS England) is an independent professional body and registered charity that promotes and advances standards of surgical care for patients, and regulates surgery and dentistry in England and Wales. The college is located at Lincoln's Inn Fields in London. It publishes multiple medical journals including the Annals of the Royal College of Surgeons of England, the Faculty Dental Journal, and the Bulletin of the Royal College of Surgeons of England.

== History ==
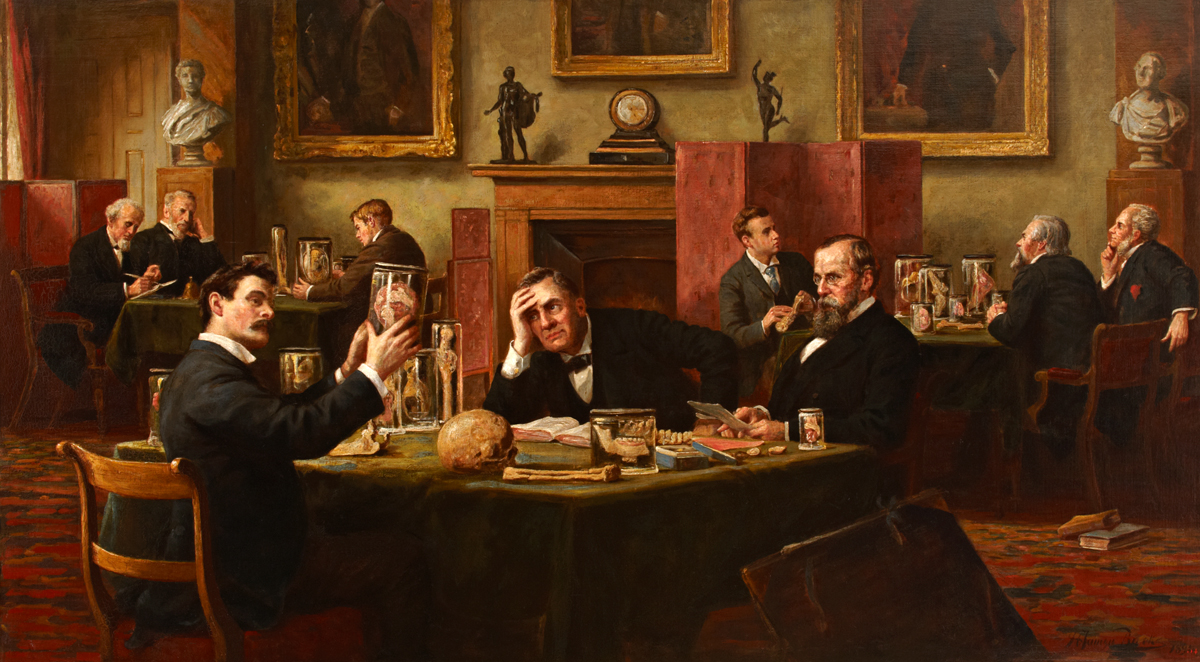
Royal College of Surgeons, Court of Examiners (1894) by Henry Jamyn Brooks

The origins of the college date to the fourteenth century with the foundation of the "Guild of Surgeons Within the City of London". Certain sources date this as occurring in 1368. There was an ongoing dispute between the surgeons and barber surgeons until an agreement was signed between them in 1493, giving the fellowship of surgeons the power of incorporation. This union was formalised further in 1540 by Henry VIII between the Worshipful Company of Barbers (incorporated 1462) and the Guild of Surgeons to form the Company of Barbers and Surgeons of London. In 1745 the surgeons broke away from the barbers to form the Company of Surgeons. In 1800 the company was granted a royal charter to become the Royal College of Surgeons in London. A further charter in 1843 granted it the present title of the Royal College of Surgeons of England.

== Members and Fellows of the College ==
The correct way to address a member or fellow of the Royal College of Surgeons is to use the title Mr, Miss, Mrs, Ms, or Mx (not Dr). This system (which applies only to surgeons, not physicians) has its origins in the 16th century, when surgeons were barber-surgeons and did not have a medical degree (or indeed any formal qualification), unlike physicians, who, by the 18th century, held a university medical degree and could thus be referred to as "Doctor".

By the time the College of Surgeons received its royal charter in 1800, the Royal College of Physicians were insisting that candidates for membership of the College of Surgeons must first have a medical degree. Therefore, the ensuing years saw aspiring surgeons having to study medicine first and hence receive the title 'doctor'. Thereafter, having obtained the diploma of Member or Fellow of the Royal College of Surgeons he would revert to the title "Mr" as a snub to the RCP. Nowadays the title "Mr" is used by Members of the college who have passed the diploma MRCS examination and the college addresses Members as "Mr" or "Ms".

In Sir Arthur Conan Doyle's The Hound of the Baskervilles, the distinction is made in the following conversation:

"Come, come, we are not so far wrong after all," said Holmes. "And now, Dr. James Mortimer—" "Mister, sir, Mister—a humble M.R.C.S."

Despite Mortimer's correction, he is referred to as "Dr. Mortimer" throughout the story.

== Buildings ==
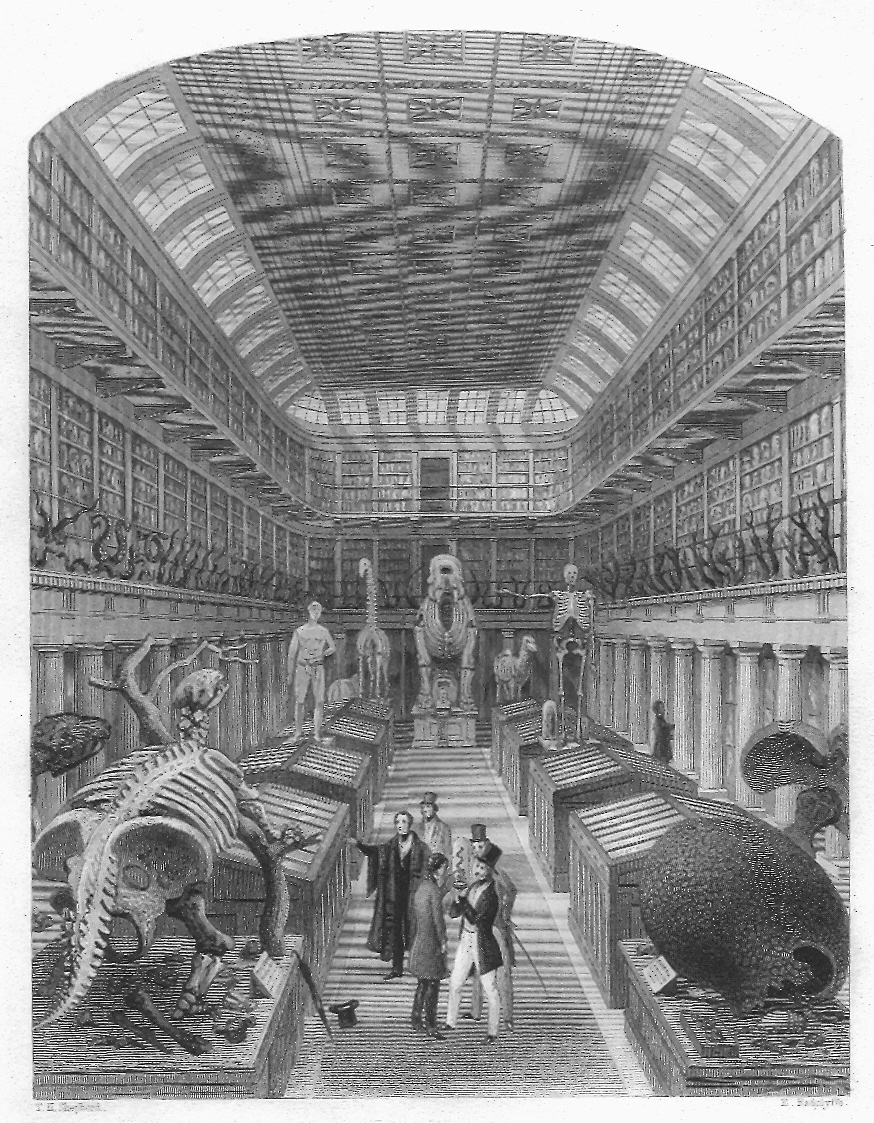
The main exhibit room, Hunterian Museum, woodblock engraving by T.H.Shepperd & E.Radclyffe, London, 1853 (Dr. Nuno Carvalho de Sousa collection, Lisbon)

The Company of Surgeons moved from Surgeon's Hall in Old Bailey to a site at 41 Lincoln's Inn Fields in 1797. The British government presented the collection of John Hunter to the surgeons after acquiring it in 1799, and in 1803 the company purchased the adjoining house at 42 Lincoln's Inn Fields to house the collection, which forms the basis of The Hunterian Museum.

Construction of the first College building, to a design by George Dance the Younger, and James Lewis, took place on this site from 1805 to 1813. The company soon outgrew these premises and in 1834 No. 40, Lincoln's Inn Fields was acquired and demolished along with the George Dance building, of which only a portion of the portico was retained. Sir Charles Barry won the public competition to design a replacement, constructing a facade largely of artificial stone composed of cast blocks of concrete and stucco. Barry extended this building southwards following the acquisition of Copeland's Warehouse on Portugal Street, and the enlarged buildings opened in 1855.

The college buildings expanded to their current extent between 1888 & 1889, when additional wings were constructed on the sites of numbers 39 & 43 Lincoln's Inn Fields and two storeys were added to the Charles Barry Building by the architect Stephen Salter (b.1826, d.1896).

In 1941 a German incendiary bomb hit the college causing extensive damage that necessitated major rebuilding during the 1950s and 60s. The surviving portion of the earlier buildings were listed Grade II* on 24 February 1958.

Planning consent for a major rebuilding of the non-listed buildings of the Royal College of Surgeons was granted by Westminster City Council in January 2017. The redevelopment of building has been designed by the architecture practice Hawkins\Brown. Barry's famous north frontage and library have been preserved and restored and The Hunterian Museum has benefited from a new façade and entrance on Portugal Street, to the south of the site. A "topping out" ceremony for the new buildings was celebrated on 24 January 2020, and the museum is now open to the public.

The exterior of the building was one of the filming locations of Agatha Christie's Poirot episode "The Mystery of the Spanish Chest".

== Hunterian Museum ==
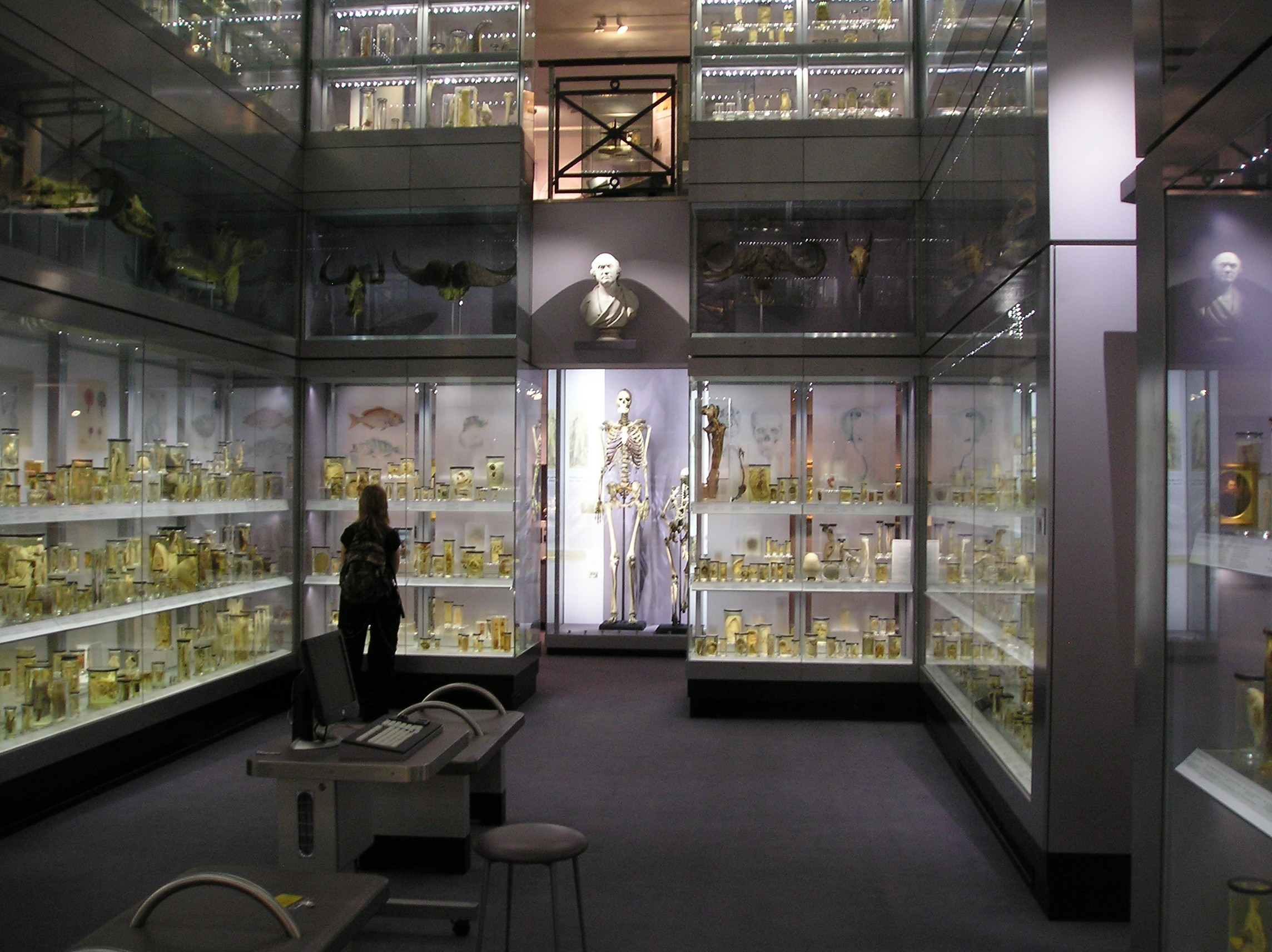
The skeleton of the seven and a half feet (230 cm) tall "Irish Giant" is visible in the middle of this image.

In 1799 the government purchased the collection of John Hunter which they presented to the college. This formed the basis of the Hunterian Collection, which has since been supplemented by others including an Odontological Collection (curated by A. E. W. Miles until the early 1990s) and the natural history collections of Richard Owen.

The Hunterian Museum is a member of The London Museums of Health & Medicine group, and displays thousands of anatomical specimens, including the Evelyn tables, surgical instruments, paintings and sculptures about medical individuals and medicine.

== Faculties ==
- Faculty of Dental Surgery
- Faculty of General Dental Practice
- Faculty of Anaesthetists (until 1988)

== Medals, awards and lectures ==
The Cheselden Medal was instituted in 2009 in honour of William Cheselden "to recognise unique achievements in, and exceptional contributions to, the advancement of surgery". The award is made at irregular intervals to reflect the outstanding qualities required of recipients and is deemed one of the college's highest professional honours.

The Royal Colleges' Bronze Medal was instituted in 1957 and is awarded jointly with the Royal College of Physicians and the Royal College of Obstetricians and Gynaecologists. It is awarded annually "on the nomination of the Medical Group of the Royal Photographic Society for the outstanding example of photography in the service of medicine and surgery".

The Wood Jones Medal was instituted in 1975 to commemorate Frederic Wood Jones (Sir William Collins Professor of Human and Comparative Anatomy and Conservator of the Anatomy Museum 1945–52). It is awarded occasionally (triennially until 1994) by a Committee "for contributions to anatomical knowledge or the teaching of anatomy in the tradition of Frederic Wood Jones".

The Clement-Price Award was founded in 1958 with a gift of 1,000 guineas from members of the staff of the Westminster Hospital in honour of Sir Clement Price Thomas. It is awarded triennially, or at such other interval as the President may decide, by the council on the recommendation of the Fellowship Election and Prize Committee, "in recognition of meritorious contributions to surgery in its widest sense, without restriction of candidature".

The Lister Medal has been awarded since 1924 (mostly on a triennial basis), after the college was entrusted in 1920 with administrating the Lister Memorial Fund, in memory of pioneering British surgeon Joseph Lister. The award is decided in conjunction with the Royal Society, the Royal College of Surgeons in Ireland, the University of Edinburgh, and the University of Glasgow. In addition to being presented with a medal, the recipient delivers the Lister Oration at the college.

The Honorary Gold Medal was instituted in 1802 and is awarded at irregular intervals "for liberal acts or distinguished labours, researches and discoveries eminently conducive to the improvement of natural knowledge and of the healing art". Recipients to date include Sir Victor Negus, Sir Geoffrey Keynes, Sir Stanford Cade (all three in 1969), Professor Harold Ellis (1998), Professor Sir Alec Jeffreys (2002) and Dr Barry J. Marshall (2005).

The Bradshaw Lecture was founded in 1875 under the will of Mrs Sally Hall Bradshaw in memory of her husband, Dr William Wood Bradshaw. It is a biennial (annual until 1993) lecture on surgery, customarily given by a senior member of the council on or about the day preceding the second Thursday of December. (Given in alternate years, with the Hunterian Oration given in the intervening years). Not to be confused with the corresponding Bradshaw Lectures delivered to the Royal College of Physicians. See Bradshaw Lecture for list of past lectures and lecturers.

The Hunterian Oration was founded in 1853 when a bequest was made by the executors of John Hunter's will, to provide for an annual dinner and oration in memory of the famous surgeon. It is now delivered biennially.

== Educational history ==
Prior to 1820, to meet the requirements of London's College of Surgeons, students would spend time in London and select courses of instruction in surgery by teachers at Guy's Hospital, St Thomas' – together known as London's Borough Hospitals – in addition to attending anatomy classes at private institutions such as William Hunter's anatomy school, attached for a time to Middlesex Hospital. Although at this time some students of surgery had already acquired the M.D. (or its equivalent) qualification, it was not until the 1830s that students of surgery were required to have obtained a medical degree at a university before commencing studies for membership of the Royal College of Surgeons. By the 1830s, medical schools in London at the University of London, St George's Hospital and King's College, London had been established and the influence of the private schools was diminished.

The college owns and preserves corpses which are used for educational purposes. In 1998, the Court of Appeal of England and Wales observed that having staff preserve these corpses entailed "many hours, sometimes weeks, of skilled work". There is a common law rule which states that "there is no property in a corpse", but the court ruled that these preserved bodies were legitimately the "property" of the college and that two artists who had stolen a number of bodies were therefore guilty of theft.

Today, the RCS offers a range of both on-line e-learning modules and hands-on practical workshops to facilitate the CPD for trainee and consultant surgeons across varies specialties.

Since May 2017, the RCS started to offer a Postgraduate Certificate in Surgery to junior surgical trainees. This qualification combined e-learning modules and practical causes "offer surgical trainees a high-quality, flexible and interactive way to build their surgical knowledge and skills" across different surgical specialties.

== Current and past Presidents ==
Name	Presidential term
Tim Lane	July 2026–present
Tim Mitchell	2023–2026
Professor Sir Neil Mortensen	2020–2023
Professor Derek Alderson	2017–2020
Dame Clare Marx	2014–2017
Sir Norman Stanley Williams	2011–2014
John Black	2008–11
Bernard Ribeiro, Baron Ribeiro	2005–08
Hugh Phillips	2004–05
Sir Peter Morris	2001–04
Sir Barry Jackson	1998–2001
Sir Rodney Sweetnam	1995–98
Sir Norman Browse	1992–95
Sir Terence English	1989–92
Sir Ian Todd	1986–89
Geoffrey Slaney	1982–86
Sir Alan Parks	1980–82
Sir Reginald Murley	1977–80
Rodney Smith, Baron Smith	1973–77
Sir Edward Muir	1972
Thomas Holmes Sellors	1969–72
Hedley Atkins	1966–69
Russell Brock, Baron Brock	1963–66
Arthur Porritt, Baron Porritt	1960–63
James Paterson Ross	1957–60
Harry Platt	1954–57
Cecil Wakeley	1949–54
Sir Alfred Webb-Johnson	1941–48
Hugh Lett	1938–40
Cuthbert Sidney Wallace	1935–37
Holburt Jacob Waring	1932–34
Berkeley Moynihan	1926–31
Sir John Bland-Sutton	1923–23
Anthony Alfred Bowlby	1920–22
George Henry Makins	1917–19
Sir William Watson Cheyne	1914–16
Rickman Godlee	1911–1913
Henry Trentham Butlin	1909–11
Sir Henry Morris, 1st Baronet	1906–08
John Tweedy	1903–05
Sir Henry Howse	1901–02
William MacCormac	1896–1900
Christopher Heath	1895
John Whitaker Hulke	1893–94
Thomas Bryant	1890–92
Jonathan Hutchinson	1889
Sir William Scovell Savory	1885–88
John Cooper Forster	1884
John Marshall	1883
Thomas Spencer Wells	1882
William James Erasmus Wilson	1881
John Eric Erichsen	1880
Luther Holden	1879
John Simon	1878
John Birkett	1877
Prescott Gardner Hewett	1876
James Paget	1875
Frederick Le Gros Clark	1874
Thomas Blizard Curling	1873
Henry Hancock	1872
George Busk	1871
William Fergusson	1870
Edward Cock	1869
Richard Quain	1868
John Hilton	1867
Richard Partridge	1866
Thomas Wormald	1865
Joseph Hodgson	1864
Frederic Carpenter Skey	1863
James Luke	1862
Caesar Henry Hawkins	1861
John Flint South	1860
James Moncrieff Arnott	1859
Joseph Henry Green	1858
Edward Stanley	1857
Benjamin Travers	1856
William Lawrence	1855
George James Guthrie	1854
James Luke	1853
Caesar Hawkins	1852
John Flint South	1851
James Moncrieff Arnott	1850
Joseph Henry Green	1849
Edward Stanley	1848
Benjamin Travers	1847
William Lawrence	1846
Samuel Cooper	1845
Sir Benjamin Collins Brodie, 1st Baronet	1844
John Goldwyer Andrews	1843
Anthony White	1842
George James Guthrie	1841
John Painter Vincent	1840
Robert Keate	1839
Honoratus Leigh Thomas	1838
Sir Anthony Carlisle	1837
Astley Paston Cooper	1836
John Goldwyer Andrews	1835
Anthony White	1834
George James Guthrie	1833
John Painter Vincent	1832
Robert Keate	1831
Richard Clement Headington	1830
Honoratus Leigh Thomas	1829
Sir Anthony Carlisle	1828
Astley Paston Cooper	1827
John Abernethy	1826
William Lynn	1825
William Norris	1824
Henry Cline	1823
William Blizard	1822
Everard Home	1821–22

== Past Masters – Royal College of Surgeons ==
Name	Magisterial term
Thompson Foster	1820
Sir David Dundas	1819
Thomas Keate	1818
George Chandler	1817
Sir James Earle	1817
William Norris	1816
Henry Cline	1815
William Blizard	1814
Everard Home	1813
Thompson Foster	1812
David Dundas	1811
Sir Charles Blicke	1810
Thomas Keate	1809
George Chandler	1808
Sir James Earle	1807
Charles Hawkins	1806
Thompson Forster	1805
David Dundas	1804
Sir Charles Blicke	1803
Thomas Keate	1802
George Chandler	1801
William Long	1800

== Past Masters – Company of Surgeons ==
Name	Magisterial term
Charles Hawkins	1799–1800
James Earle	1798
John Gunning	1797
Isaac Minors	1796
William Cooper	1795
William Walker	1794
John Wyatt	1793
Samuel Howard	1792
William Lucas	1791
Charles Hawkins	1790
John Gunning	1789
Henry Watson	1788
Edmund Pitts	1787
Isaac Minors	1786
Henry Watson	1785
Joseph Warner	1784
Richard Grindall	1782–3
Peter Triquet	1781
Joseph Warner	1780
Fleming Pinkstan	1779
Pennell Hawkins	1778
Robert Young	1776–77
Richard Grindall	1775
Matthew Spray	1774
Joseph Warner	1773
John Pyle	1772
Wentworth Gregory	1770–71
William Bromfield	1769
Benjamin Cowell	1768
Robert Adair	1767
Stafford Crane	1766
Percivall Pott	1765
Robert Young	1764
John Blagden	1763
John Townsend	1762
David Middleton	1761
Edward Nourse	1760
Christopher Fullagar	1759
Mark Hawkins	1758
William Singleton	1757
John Westbrook	1756
Noah Roul	1755
James Hickes	1754
Legard Sparham	1753
John Ranby	1751–52
Peter Sainthill	1749–50
Caesar Hawkins	1748
John Freke	1747
William Cheselden	1746
John Ranby	1745

== See also ==
- Hunterian Oration
- Royal College of Surgeons of Edinburgh
- Royal College of Surgeons in Ireland
- Association of Surgeons in Training
- Royal College of Physicians and Surgeons of Glasgow
- Definitive Surgical Trauma Skills
