= Thomas Chevalier =

English surgeon and writer (1767–1824)

Thomas Chevalier FRS FSA
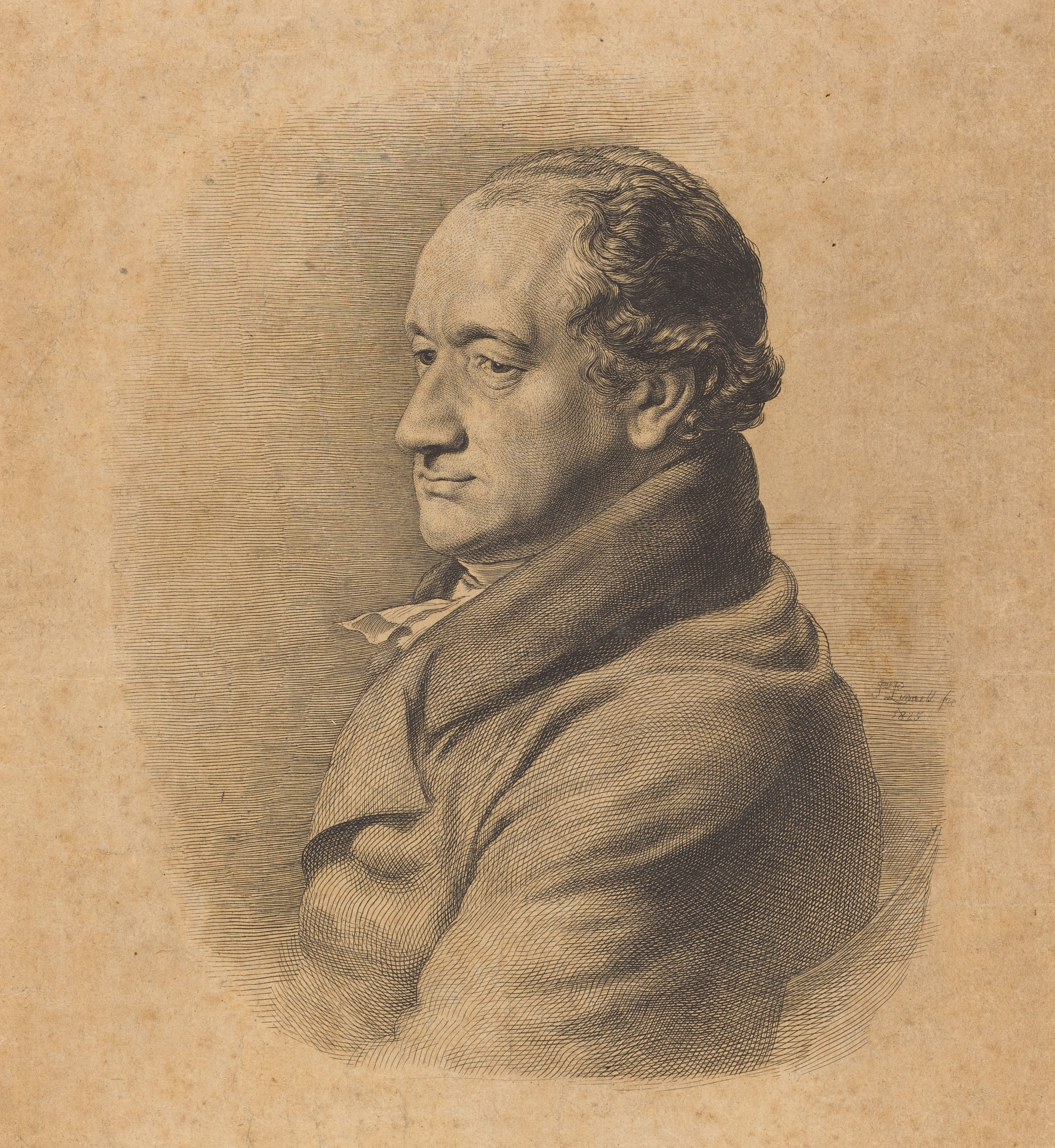
- Thomas Chevalier, &c., Drawn from the life, and Engraved by John Linnell (1825)
- Born: 3 November 1767; London
- Died: 9 June 1824 (aged 56); London
- Education: Pembroke College, Cambridge
- Scientific career
- Fields: Surgery; Anatomy
- Workplaces: Royal College of Surgeons; Royal Society

Thomas Chevalier, FRS, FSA (1767–1824) was an English surgeon and medical writer who rose to become Surgeon Extraordinary to the King and Professor of Anatomy and Surgery to the Royal College of Physicians.

== Life ==
Thomas Chevalier was born in London on 3 November 1767. His paternal grandfather was a French Protestant, resident at Orleans, and escaped from France in an open boat on the revocation of the Edict of Nantes. On the death of his mother in 1770 Chevalier was brought up by her brother, Thomas Sturgis, a general practitioner in South Audley Street, London. He studied anatomy under Matthew Baillie, and appears to have obtained a university degree of MA (probably at Cambridge, where the name of Thomas Chevallier is recorded as AB of Pembroke College, 1792).

He became a member of the London Corporation of Surgeons, and in 1797 defended it in a pamphlet written to promote the movement for transforming the corporation into a college. In this pamphlet Chevalier gives a learned sketch of the history of surgery. He was appointed surgeon to the Westminster Dispensary and lecturer on surgery. In 1801 he published an Introduction to a Course of Lectures on the Operations of Surgery, and in 1804 a Treatise on Gunshot Wounds, which had obtained the prize of the College of Surgeons in 1803, and which reached a third edition in 1806. It also secured him the appointment of Surgeon Extraordinary to the Prince of Wales, and a present of a diamond ring from the Czar of Russia. In 1821 Chevalier delivered an able Hunterian Oration (published in 4to, 1823); he also gave excellent courses of lectures at the College of Surgeons, as Professor of Anatomy and Surgery, in 1823, on the General Structure of the Human Body and the Anatomy and Functions of the Skin; these were also published in the same year.

Chevalier was highly esteemed, not only as a surgeon and anatomist, but as a man of linguistic and theological erudition. He translated into English Bossuet's Universal History, 1810, and Pascal's Thoughts, 1803, and made numerous contributions to periodical literature. He wrote the preface to Bagster's polyglot Bible, and compiled the collection of texts and various readings. His last publication was Remarks on Suicide, 1824, in which he urges that suicide is often one of the earliest symptoms of insanity, as shown by the history of those who have failed in the attempt, and he recommends verdicts of "suicide during insanity" in the majority of cases.

He died suddenly on 9 June 1824. He had been an active member (for many years deacon) of the Keppel Street (Russell Square) Baptist chapel.

== See also ==
- Henry Cline
