= Charles Galasko =

South African orthopaedic surgeon

- Born: Charles Samuel Bernard Galasko; 1939 (age 86–87)
- Occupation: Orthopaedic surgeon

Charles Samuel Bernard Galasko (born 1939), often cited as Charles S. B. Galasko, is a South African orthopaedic surgeon.

Galasko was educated at the University of Witwatersrand in Johannesburg.

He was director of orthopaedics at the Royal Postgraduate Medical School from 1973 to 1976.

From 1976 to 2004 he worked as professor of orthopaedic surgery at the University of Manchester, becoming emeritus on retirement. At the same time he was consultant orthopaedic surgeon at the Royal Manchester Children's Hospital and at Hope Hospital.

He has served as president of the British Orthopaedic Association; president of the International Orthopaedic Research Society; vice-president of the Royal College of Surgeons of England; and chair of the Joint Committee for Higher Surgical Training (UK and Ireland) and of the Intercollegiate Academic Board for Sport and Exercise Medicine.

He was the first president of the Faculty of Sport and Exercise Medicine UK; and was a member of the British Olympic Association's medical committee for 15 years; chair of the British Amateur Wrestling Association and their medical adviser from 1986 to 2002; and vice-chair of English Wrestling, being their medical adviser from 1986 to 2002.

He was made an Honorary Fellow of the Faculty of Sport and Exercise Medicine (FFSEM) in 2014. He is also a Fellow of the Royal College of Surgeons of England (FRCS (Eng)), a Fellow of the Royal College of Surgeons of Edinburgh (FRSCEd), and a Fellow of the Academy of Medical Sciences (FMedSci).

He gave the 2003 Hunterian Oration, with a lecture entitled Hunter's Legacy and Surgical Training and Competence in the 21st Century.

He gave many lectures of the subject of Doping In Sport including to the Manchester Literary & Philosophical Society WILDE LECTURE, on 6 January 2016 where notes of his lecture may be viewed.
