= Richard Stafford =

Richard Stafford may refer to:

- Richard Stafford (pioneer), land speculator and pioneer of Hampshire County, West Virginia
- Richard Stafford, 1st Baron Stafford of Clifton, English soldier and diplomat
- Richard Anthony Stafford (1801–1854), English surgeon
- Dick Stafford, English rugby union player
