= Luther Holden =

English surgeon (1816–1905)

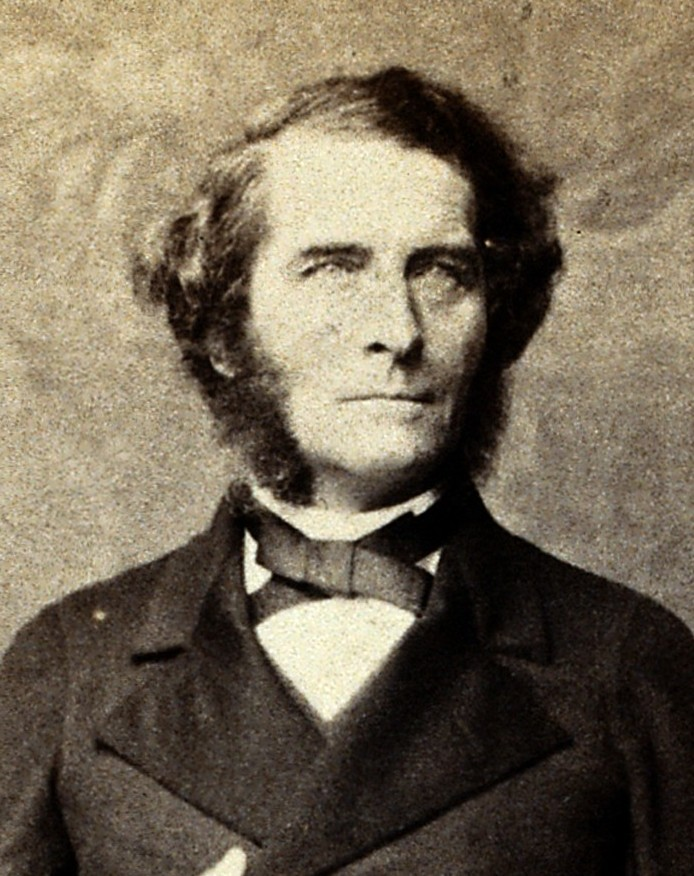
- Born: 11 December 1816; Birmingham, England
- Died: 1905 (aged 88–89); Putney, England
- Occupation: Surgeon

Luther Holden (11 December 1816 – 1905) was an English surgeon.

== Biography ==
Holden was born on 11 December 1816, in his grandfather's house at Birmingham, was second son of the Rev. Henry Augustus Holden (1785–1870), who married his cousin Mary Willetts, daughter of Hyla Holden of Wednesbury in Staffordshire. His father, on retiring from the army with the rank of lieutenant, matriculated at Worcester College, Oxford, in 1814 (B.A. 1817), and held the curacies of Wolstanton in Shropshire and of Warmington near Banbury, where he took pupils, but on being left a small fortune gave up his curacy and lived at Brighton and afterwards in London. His eldest son was Henry Holden (1814–1909). His fourth son, Philip Melanchthon Holden (1823–1904), was for forty-two years rector of Upminster in Essex.

Luther, after successive education at home with his father's pupils, at a private school in Birmingham, and at Havre in 1827, where he made rapid progress in French, entered St. Bartholomew's Hospital in 1831. Apprenticed for five years to Edward Stanley, he was admitted M.R.C.S. England in 1838, and then studied for one year in Berlin and another in Paris, where an Italian student taught him to speak and to read Italian. He was surgeon to the Metropolitan Dispensary, Fore Street, from 1843, living in the Old Jewry and teaching anatomy to private pupils, among whom was William Palmer, the poisoner. Holden was one of the twenty-four successful candidates at the first examination for the newly established order of fellows of the College of Surgeons (24 December 1844).

Appointed in 1846 with A. M. McWhinnie superintendent of dissections (or demonstrator) at St. Bartholomew's Hospital, he was elected in 1859 jointly with Frederick Skey to lecture upon descriptive and surgical anatomy. This office he resigned in June 1871. Elected assistant surgeon to the hospital in July 1860, and full surgeon in August 1865, he became consulting surgeon in 1881. He then resigned his hospital appointments on attaining the age of sixty-five, and retiring from his house in Gower Street to Pinetoft, Rushmere, near Ipswich, he thenceforth spent much time in travel, visiting Egypt, Australia, India and Japan. In 1898 he was entertained by the medical profession at Johannesburg. He remained surgeon to the Foundling Hospital from 1864 until his "death. At the Royal College of Surgeons Holden was a member of the council (1868–84); an examiner in surgery (1873–83); in anatomy (1875–6), and a member of the board of dental examiners (1879–82). He was vice-president (1877–8), president in 1879, and Hunterian orator in 1881. Holden died at Putney on 6 February 1906, and was buried in the cemetery of the parish church at Upminster. By his will he bequeathed 3000l. to the medical school of St. Bartholomew's Hospital to endow a scholarship in surgery. He also made handsome bequests to St. Bartholomew's Hospital and to the Foundling Hospital. He was twice married (both wives bore the same name and were of the same family): (1) in July 1851 to Frances, daughter of Benjamin Wasey Sterry of Upminster, Essex; and (2) in 1868 to Frances, daughter of Wasey Sterry, who survived him. He had no children.

A fluent linguist, a classical scholar, and a keen sportsman, he was also known for his strengths in the hunting field. A three-quarter length portrait in oils, by Sir J. E. Millais, R.A., presented on Holden's retirement, hangs in the great hall at St. Bartholomew's Hospital. It has been engraved.

Holden, one of the last members of the anatomical school of surgery of the mid-nineteenth century, was primarily interested in anatomical, and only in a subordinate degree in surgical, study, and then in its clinical rather than in its operative aspect. He held that anatomy could be learnt only by personal dissection and examination of the dissected subject, and not by lectures, books, or pictures. An unpublished paper by him, 'On the Mechanism of the Hip Joint,' read at the Abernethian Society at St. Bartholomew's Hospital (24 Nov. 1850), exerted much influence. It dealt with the effect of atmospheric pressure in retaining the ball-shaped head of the femur within the socket of the acetabulum, and with the importance of keeping the anterior part of the capsular ligament in the erect attitude.

Holden published:

'Manual of the Dissection of the Human Body,' a book enjoying a large circulation, 1850, 4 pts. without illustrations; 1851, 1 vol. copiously illustrated; 5th edit. 1885; Philadelphia, 7th edit. 1901, 2 vols. 'Human Osteology,' 1855, 2 vols.; later editions 1 vol.; 8th edit. 1899; this work marked a distinct advance in the study of the human skeleton; the illustrations by Holden and etched on stone by Thomas Godart, librarian of the medical school of St. Bartholomew's Hospital, are of the highest order; they formed at the time a new feature in the teaching of anatomy, for the origins and insertions of the muscles were shown upon the figures of the bones in red and blue lines. 'Landmarks Medical and Surgical,' first published in the 'St. Bartholomew's Hospital Reports,' vol. 2 (1866), and vol. 6 (1870), separately issued in an enlarged and revised form in 1876; 4th edit. 1888; translated into Spanish by D. Servendo Talón y Calva (Madrid, 1894): a study of the application of anatomy to surgery proving how much anatomy can be learnt on the surface of the living body whilst the skin is yet unbroken.
