= Charles Fagge =

British surgeon (1873–1939)

Charles Herbert Fagge (1873–1939) was a British surgeon.

He was born in Lutterworth, Leicestershire and educated at Oundle School. In 1890 he entered Guy's Hospital Medical School graduating MB in 1897. In 1899 he was appointed assistant demonstrator of anatomy and in 1906 demonstrator and lecturer on anatomy at the medical school. From 1902 to 1908 he was also Surgeon-in-Charge of the aural department. In 1905 he was elected Assistant Surgeon and in 1917 full Surgeon, retiring in 1933. From then until his death he was Consultant Surgeon.

During World War I, Fagge was appointed a major in the Royal Army Medical Corps in 1915, and served at the Hampstead Military Hospital. He was later promoted to temporary lieutenant-colonel and attached to the 2nd London General Hospital, acting at the same time as consulting surgeon to the Royal Red Cross Hospital for Officers at Fishmongers Hall. He was ordered to France in 1917 with the rank of brevet colonel, but suffered from dysentery and was invalided home.

He was a Fellow of the Royal College of Surgeons of England and in 1928 delivered their Bradshaw Lecture on Axial rotation. In 1936 he delivered their Hunterian oration on the subject of John Hunter to John Hilton.

He had married Beatrice Dora Metcalfe in 1899; they had a son and three daughters. He developed Parkinson's disease and died in 1939.
