= Anthony White (surgeon) =

English surgeon

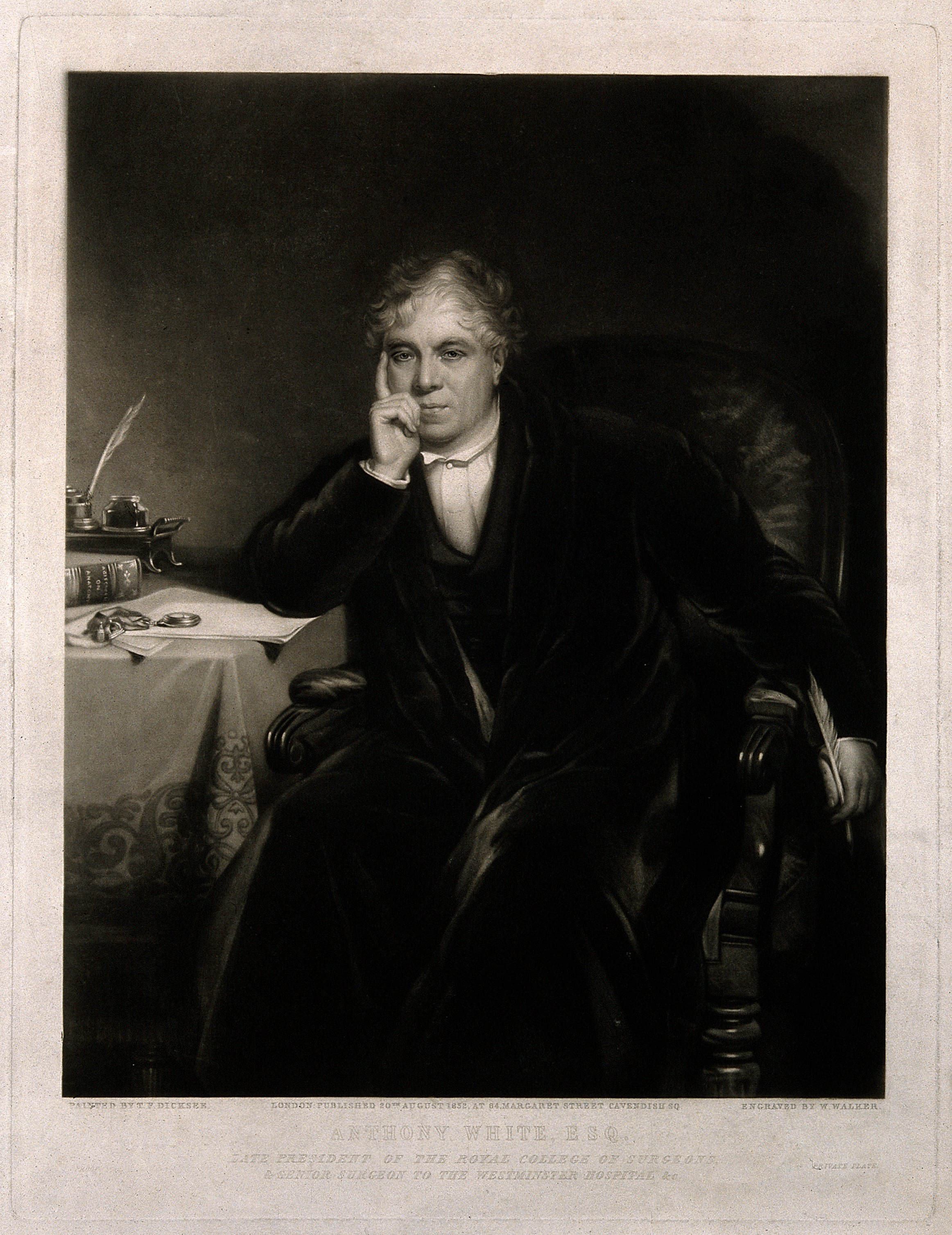
- Born: 1782
- Died: 9 March 1849 (aged 66–67)
- Occupation: Surgeon

Anthony White (1782 – 9 March 1849) was an English surgeon.

== Biography ==
White was born in 1782 at Norton in Durham, a member of a family long resident in the county, was educated at Witton-le-Wear, and afterwards at Cambridge, where he graduated bachelor of medicine from Emmanuel College in 1804, having been admitted a pensioner on 18 May 1799. He was apprenticed to Sir Anthony Carlisle, and was admitted a member of the Royal College of Surgeons of England on 2 September 1803. He was elected an assistant-surgeon to the Westminster Hospital on 24 July 1806, surgeon on 24 April 1823, and consulting surgeon on 23 December 1846. At the College of Surgeons he was elected a member of the council on 6 September 1827, and two years later, 10 September 1829, he was appointed a member of the court of examiners in succession to William Wadd. In 1831 he delivered the Hunterian oration (unpublished), and he became vice-president in 1832 and again in 1840, serving the office of president in 1834 and 1842. He also filled the office of surgeon to the Royal Society of Musicians.

White suffered severely from gout in his later years, and died at his house in Parliament Street on 9 March 1849. As a surgeon he is remarkable because he was the first to excise the head of the femur for disease of the hip-joint, a proceeding then considered to be so heroic that Sir Anthony Carlisle and Sir William Blizard threatened to report him to the College of Surgeons. He performed the operation with complete success, and sent the patient to call upon his opponents. His besetting sin was unpunctuality, and he often entirely forgot his appointments, yet he early acquired a large and lucrative practice.

White published:

- ‘Treatise on the Plague,’ &c., London, 1846, 8vo.
- ‘An Enquiry into the Proximate Cause of Gout, and its Rational Treatment,’ London, 1848, 8vo; 2nd edit. 1848; American edit. New York, 1852, 8vo.

A three-quarter-length portrait in oils by Thomas Francis Dicksee, engraved by William Walker, was published on 20 August 1852. A likeness by Simpson is in the board-room of the Westminster Hospital.
