= Edward Stanley (surgeon) =

English surgeon

- Born: 3 July 1793
- Died: 24 May 1862 (aged 68)
- Occupation: Surgeon

Edward Stanley (3 July 1793 – 24 May 1862) was an English surgeon.

== Biography ==
Stanley was the son of Edward Stanley, who was in business in the city of London. He was born on 3 July 1793, his mother being the sister of Thomas Blizard, surgeon to the London Hospital. He was entered at Merchant Taylors' School in April 1802, and remained there until 1808, when he was apprenticed to Thomas Ramsden, one of the surgeons at St. Bartholomew's Hospital. Ramsden died in 1810, and Stanley was turned over to John Abernethy to serve the remainder of his time. He was admitted a member of the College of Surgeons in 1814, and gained the Jacksonian prize in 1815. He was elected assistant surgeon to St. Bartholomew's Hospital on 29 Jan. 1816, at the early age of 24. Even during his apprenticeship he had rendered important services to the medical school of the hospital, for his love of morbid anatomy led him, with Abernethy's assistance and approval, to enlarge the museum so greatly that he practically created it. He acted for a time as demonstrator of anatomy, but in 1826 he was appointed to lecture upon this subject on Abernethy's resignation. He continued to lecture until 1848, when he was succeeded by Frederic Carpenter Skey. Stanley was elected to the post of full surgeon in 1838, and he then rapidly became famous as a clinical teacher of great power. He was elected a fellow of the Royal Society in 1830.

At the Royal College of Surgeons he held in succession the most important offices. He was elected a life member of the council in 1832, Arris and Gale professor of human anatomy and physiology in 1835, Hunterian orator in 1839, a member of the court of examiners in 1844, and president in 1848 and again in 1857. He was appointed surgeon-extraordinary to Queen Victoria in 1858, and he was president of the Royal Medical and Chirurgical Society as early as 1843.

Stanley resigned his post of surgeon to St. Bartholomew's Hospital in 1861, but he regularly attended the weekly operations on Saturdays until 24 May 1862, when he was attacked by cerebral hæmorrhage while watching an operation, and died an hour later. Stanley was one of the most sagacious teachers and judicious practitioners of his day. He was a blunt, kindly, humorous, straightforward, and honest man.

He published:

- ‘Illustrations of the Effects of Disease and Injury of the Bones,’ with descriptive and explanatory statements, plates, London, folio, 1849. A series of coloured plates splendidly executed, drawn from original preparations, most of which are still extant.
- ‘A Treatise on Diseases of the Bones,’ 8vo, London, 1849. An edition was also published in the same year at Philadelphia. These two classical works represented for many years all that was known of the pathology of the subject of bone disease.
- ‘A Manual of Practical Anatomy,’ London, 12mo, 1818; 2nd edit. 1822; 3rd edit. 1826.
- ‘An Account of the Mode of performing the Lateral Operation of Lithotomy,’ plates, 4to, 1829. 5. ‘Hunterian Oration,’ London, 1839.
