= Geoffrey Slaney =

Surgeon

Professor Sir Geoffrey Slaney KBE FRCS
- Born: 19 September 1922
- Died: 29 January 2016 (aged 93)
- Occupations: Surgeon and academic
- Title: Barling Professor of Surgery (1971 to 1986)

Academic work
- Discipline: Medicine
- Sub-discipline: Vascular surgery; gastrointestinal surgery
- Institutions: University of Birmingham

Sir Geoffrey Slaney, KBE, FRCS (19 September 1922 – 29 January 2016) was a British surgeon and academic, specialising in vascular and gastrointestinal surgery. He held the Barling Chair of Surgery at the University of Birmingham from 1971 to 1986, and was the President of the Royal College of Surgeons of England from 1982 to 1986.

== Career ==
=== Military service ===
During the Second World War, Slaney was a member of the University of Birmingham's Home Guard battalion.

In 1948, Slaney was called up to the British Army to complete his national service. He was commissioned into the Royal Army Medical Corps (RAMC) as a lieutenant on 22 August 1948. He was promoted to captain on 22 August 1949. He served as a medical officer at Catterick Garrison in Yorkshire, England, and in Hamburg, Germany. He left the army in 1950 after completing the required two years service.

=== Medical career ===
Slaney began his medical career as a house surgeon at Birmingham General Hospital from 1947 to 1948. Then, from 1948 to 1950, he was a medical officer in the British Army. From 1950 to 1953, he worked as a surgical registrar at hospitals in Coventry and London. From 1953 to 1959, he was a surgical registrar at Queen Elizabeth Hospital, Birmingham. In 1955, he undertook a one-year post at Cook County Hospital in Chicago, United States: he worked under Warren Henry Cole and was exposed to the relatively new specialism of vascular surgery. In 1958, he joined Dudley Road Hospital as a surgeon.

=== Academic career ===
From 1953 to 1959, Slaney was a lecturer in surgery at the University of Birmingham. He was promoted to senior lecturer in 1959. He held the Hunterian Professorship of the Royal College of Surgeons for 1961/1962. He was made Professor of Surgery in 1966. From 1971 to 1986, he held the Barling Chair of Surgery.

In December 1982, Slaney was elected as the next President of the Royal College of Surgeons of England in succession to Sir Alan Parks. He served as president until 1986, when he was succeeded by Sir Ian Todd. In 1987, he gave the Hunterian Oration, a lecture of the Royal College of Surgeons of England.

== Honours ==
In the 1984 Queen's Birthday Honours, Slaney was appointed a Knight Commander of the Order of the British Empire (KBE) and therefore granted the title sir.

Academic offices
Preceded by Sir Alan Parks	President of the Royal College of Surgeons of England; 1982 to 1986	Succeeded by Sir Ian Todd
