= Honoratus Leigh Thomas =

Welsh surgeon (1769–1846)

Honoratus Leigh Thomas (1769–1846) was a Welsh surgeon.

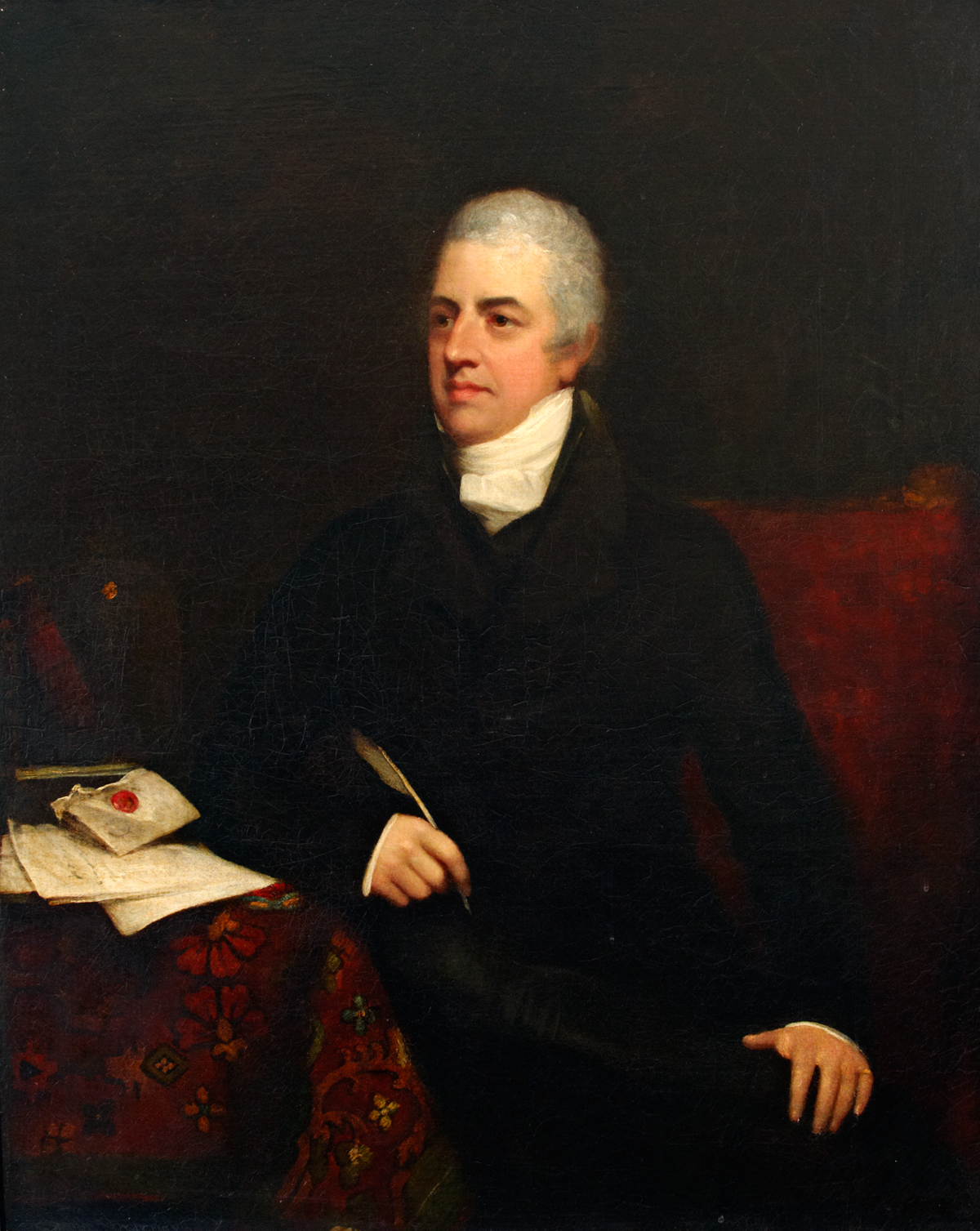
Honoratus Leigh Thomas

== Life ==
The son of John Thomas of Hawarden, Flintshire, by his wife Maria, sister of the publisher John Boydell, Honoratus was born on 26 March 1769. When he was 8 years old, a young (13 or 16 year old) Emma Hart moved into the family home as a nurse-maid. She was later to become Emma, Lady Hamilton.

Going to London as a very young man with a letter of introduction to John Hunter, he was appointed dresser to Hunter at St. George's Hospital and a pupil of William Cumberland Cruikshank the anatomist. He obtained the diploma of the Corporation of Surgeons on 16 October 1794, was an original member of the London College of Surgeons, and was elected to the fellowship on its foundation in 1843.

Thomas's early professional work was in the army and navy. He passed as 1st mate, 3rd rate (navy), on 5 July 1792, and, on the recommendation of Hunter, was appointed assistant surgeon to the Macartney Embassy to China in the same year. In 1799 he volunteered for medical service with the Duke of York's army in the Anglo-Russian invasion of Holland. On the capitulation of the forces to the French, Thomas wished to remain with the wounded, who could not be moved. He was told that he could only stay as a prisoner, and he decided to remain in that capacity. Later he was allowed to return home.

Thomas married the elder daughter of Cruikshank, and in 1800 succeeded to his father-in-law's practice in Leicester Place, where he resided for nearly half a century. Called in for consultation in medical cases, he made more of a reputation in that way than as a surgeon.

At the College of Surgeons Thomas was a member of the court of assistants from 1818 to 1845, examiner from 1818 to 1845, vice-president in 1827, 1828, 1836, and 1837, and president in 1829 and 1838. In 1827 he delivered the Hunterian oration, with personal reminiscences of Hunter. He was elected a Fellow of the Royal Society on 16 January 1806, and was also a member of the Imperial Academy of St. Petersburg. He died at Belmont, Torquay, on 26 June 1846.

== Works ==
In addition to his Hunterian oration, Thomas published some papers:

- Description of an Hermaphrodite Lamb
- Anatomical Description of a Male Rhinoceros
- Case of Artificial Dilatation of the Female Urethra
- Case of Obstruction in the Large Intestines occasioned by a Biliary Calculus of extraordinary size

== Family ==
The scholar Edward Thomas was his son. His daughter Isabella married Philip Perceval Hutchins (1818–1928), and another daughter Frances married George Payne Rainsford James in 1828.Another daughter was Alison Thomas. She was married to Dr. Alexander John Sutherland (MD, FRS), a prominent Westminster-born physician and lunacy specialist at St. Luke's Hospital.

== Notes ==
Attribution

This article incorporates text from a publication now in the public domain: Lee, Sidney, ed. (1898). "Thomas, Honoratus Leigh". Dictionary of National Biography. Vol. 56. London: Smith, Elder & Co.
