= Richard Anthony Stafford =

English surgeon

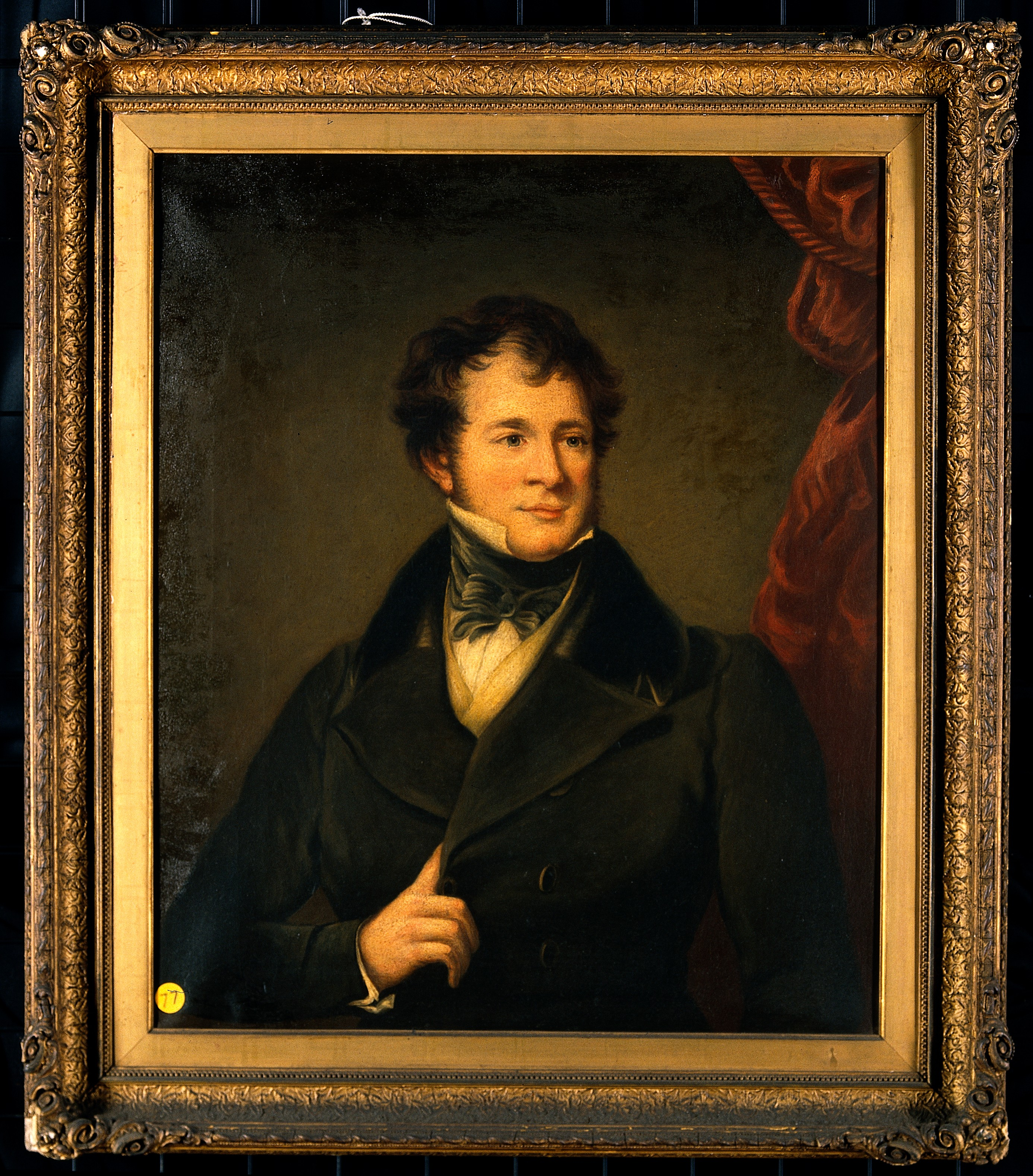
- Born: 1801
- Died: 15 January 1854 (aged 52–53)
- Occupation: Surgeon

Richard Anthony Stafford (1801 – 15 January 1854) was an English surgeon.

== Biography ==
Stafford was third son of Egerton Stafford, rector of Chalcombe and of Thenford in Northamptonshire, was born at Cropredy, Oxfordshire, in 1801. Through his mother he was one of the next of kin to William of Wykeham. Stafford was educated privately, and was then apprenticed to two noted practitioners of Cirencester, Lawrence and Warner, the former being father of the great surgeon, Sir William Lawrence. He came to London in 1820, and entered St. Bartholomew's Hospital. Here he soon attracted the notice of John Abernethy, who appointed him his house-surgeon for 1823–4. He was admitted a member of the Royal College of Surgeons of England in 1824. He then went abroad and spent a year in Paris. He returned to London in 1826, and commenced to practise as a surgeon. The Jacksonian prize was awarded to him in this year for his essay ‘On Spina Bifida, and Injuries and Diseases of the Spine and the Medulla Spinalis.’ He was elected senior surgeon to the St. Marylebone infirmary in 1831, and was subsequently appointed surgeon-extraordinary to H.R.H. the duke of Cambridge. At the Royal College of Surgeons of England he was elected one of the first fellows in 1843, and he was made a member of its council in 1848, though he was soon obliged to retire on account of ill-health. He was elected Hunterian orator for 1851, and prepared an oration which was printed in the same year. He was too ill to deliver it, and he died unmarried on 15 January 1854, at 28 Old Burlington Street.

There is a half-length portrait of Stafford, painted by William Salter and engraved by John Cochran. A copy of the engraving is prefixed to Pettigrew's memoir.

Stafford was a skilful surgeon, whose work was always conducted upon the legitimate basis of an accurate anatomical knowledge. He was a voluminous writer upon subjects of professional interest. He published:

- ‘A Series of Observations on Strictures of the Urethra,’ London, 8vo, 1828.
- ‘Further Observations on Lancetted Stylettes,’ London, 8vo, 1829; 3rd edit. 1836.
- ‘A Treatise on Injuries … of the Spine, founded on the Jacksonian Prize Essay for 1826,’ London, 8vo, 1832.
- ‘On Perforation of Strictures of the Urethra,’ London, 8vo, 1834.
- ‘An Essay on the Treatment of some Affections of the Prostate Gland,’ London, 8vo, 1840; 2nd edit. 1845.
- ‘On Treatment of Hæmorrhoids,’ 8vo, 1853.
