= Thomas Wormald =

English surgeon (1802–1873)

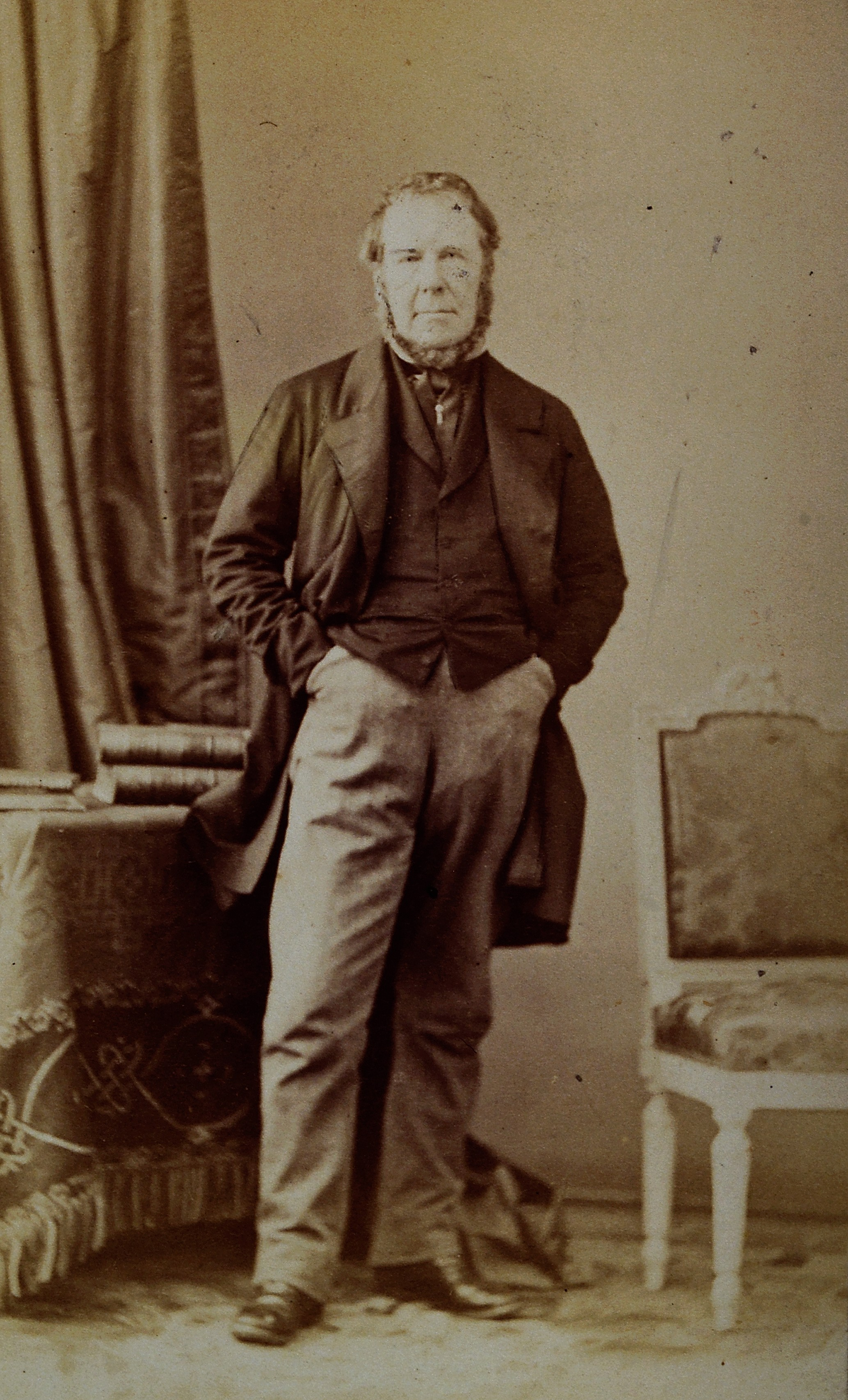
- Born: January 1802; Pentonville, London, England
- Died: 28 December 1873 (aged 71); Gomersal, Yorkshire, England
- Burial place: Highgate Cemetery, London
- Spouse: Frances Meacock (m. 1828)
- Children: 8

Thomas Wormald (January 1802 − 28 December 1873) was an English surgeon.

== Biography ==
=== Early life ===
Born at Pentonville, London, England in January 1802, was son of John Wormald, a partner in Messrs. Child's bank, and of Fanny, his wife. He was educated at Batley Grammar School in Yorkshire, and then by W. Heald, vicar of Birstal. He returned to London in 1818, and was then apprenticed to John Abernethy the surgeon to St. Bartholomew's Hospital. His master soon employed him to make preparations for his lectures, to teach the junior students, and to assist Edward Stanley (1793−1862), the demonstrator of anatomy in the medical school, in preserving specimens for the Pathological Museum. Wormald found time during his apprenticeship to visit the continental schools.

=== Career ===
Wormald was admitted a member of the Royal College of Surgeons of England in 1824, and Abernethy, who was at this time contemplating the resignation of his anatomy lectureship, made arrangements for Wormald to become the demonstrator of anatomy in place of Stanley, who was to be promoted to the lectureship. But when the time arrived for making the appointment Frederic Carpenter Skey was elected demonstrator, and in October 1824 Wormald was nominated house-surgeon to William Lawrence, then newly appointed surgeon to St. Bartholomew's Hospital.

In 1826, Wormald was appointed jointly with Skey to give the anatomical demonstrations, and in 1828, when Skey temporarily left the hospital to join the Aldersgate Street school of medicine, Wormald continued to act as sole demonstrator, a position he held for fifteen years. He was elected assistant surgeon to St. Bartholomew's Hospital on 13 February 1838, but it was not until 3 April 1861 that he became full surgeon to the charity. Five years later, on 9 April 1867, he had reached the age of sixty-five, at which the hospital regulations compelled him to resign office. He was appointed consulting surgeon, and retired to his country house in Hertfordshire.

At the Foundling Hospital he was surgeon from 1843 to 1864, and his services were so highly appreciated that he was chosen a governor in 1847. At the Royal College of Surgeons of England Wormald held all the important offices. Elected a fellow in 1843, he was a member of the council, 1849−67; Hunterian orator in 1857, examiner 1858−68, and chairman of the midwifery board in 1864. He was a vice-president in 1863−4, and he was elected president in 1865.

=== Death ===
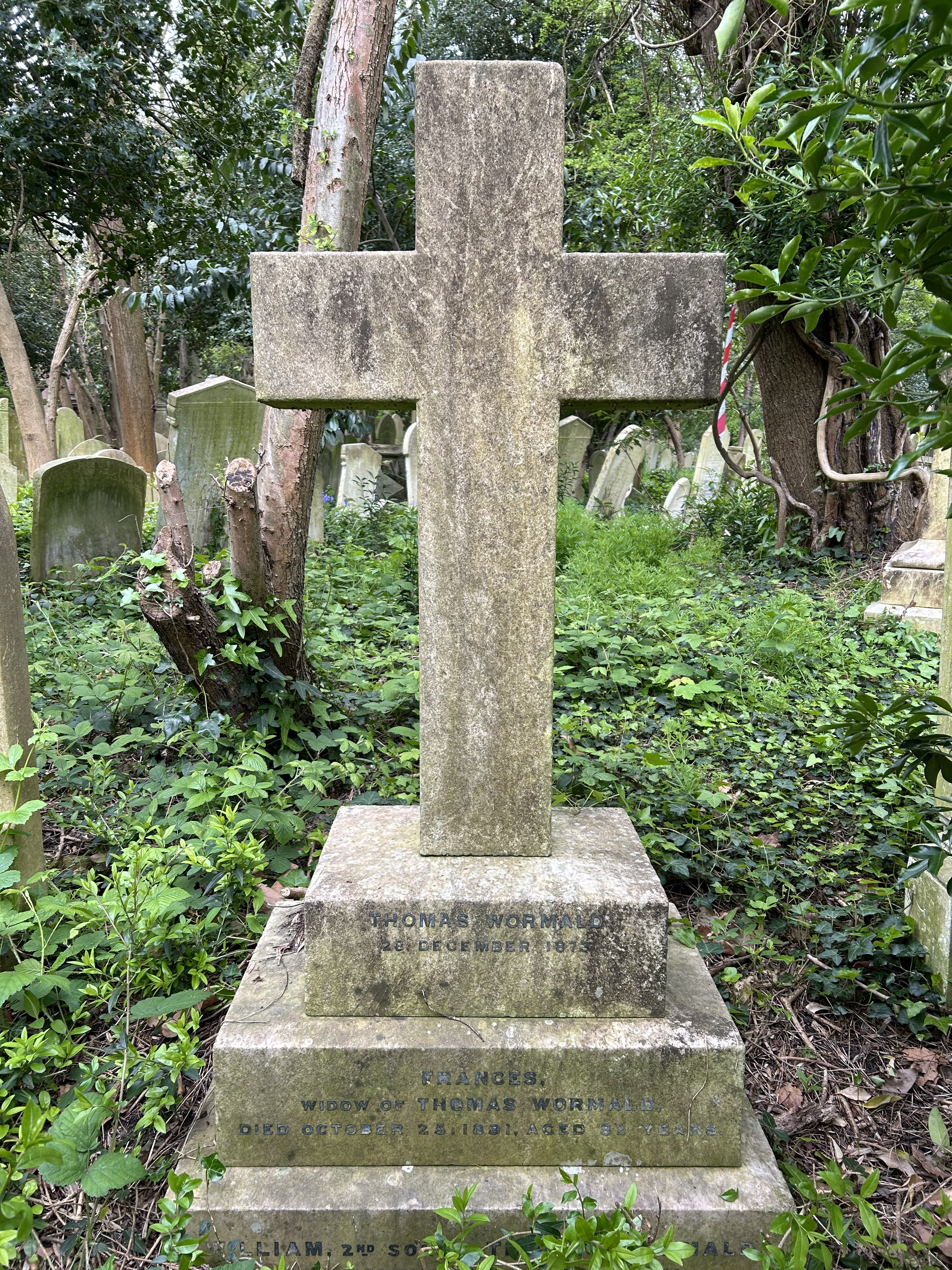
Grave of Thomas Wormald in Highgate Cemetery

He died at Gomersal in Yorkshire, during a visit, on 28 December 1873, and is buried on the western side of Highgate Cemetery. He married Frances Meacock in September 1828, and by her had eight children.

Wormald was the last of the apprentices of John Abernethy, and at his death the last link was snapped which connected St. Bartholomew's Hospital with Hunterian surgery. As a teacher of surgical anatomy Wormald has seldom been surpassed; as a surgeon he was a perfect assistant, while his mechanical genius enabled him to excel in the manipulative parts of his art. His surgical teaching was strictly clinical. He was a pertinent and ready public speaker.

== Works ==
Wormald published (with A. M. McWhinnie) A Series of Anatomical Sketches and Diagrams with Descriptions and References, London, 1838; reissued in 1843. These sketches are true to nature and are not overloaded with detail.
