= Hedley Atkins =

Atkins in 1967.

Sir Hedley John Barnard Atkins KBE FRCS (30 December 1905 – 26 November 1983) was the first professor of surgery at Guy's Hospital and President of the Royal College of Surgeons.

He was the son of Guy's Hospital physician Sir John Atkins and Elizabeth May (née Smith) and was educated at Rugby School and Trinity College, Oxford. He gained a physiology degree at Oxford and in 1937 was appointed to the staff of Guy's as assistant surgeon, spending all his professional life in that institution.

In 1942, during World War II, he went to North Africa with the Royal Army Medical Corps, subsequently served in Italy and the UK, was mentioned in despatches and demobilised with the rank of Lieutenant-Colonel. He specialised in the scientific treatment of breast cancer and the Hedley Atkins Breast Unit at New Cross Hospital acknowledges his contribution in the field.

He was elected a fellow of the Royal College of Surgeons in 1934, and became vice-president from 1964 to 1966 and President from 1966 to 1969. He was Bradshaw Lecturer in 1965 and delivered their Hunterian oration in 1971. From 1971 to 1973 he was President of the Royal Society of Medicine.

In 1959 he edited Tools of Biological Research and in 1977, wrote Memoirs of a Surgeon

He and his wife moved into Down House in Downe, Kent in 1962 to be honorary curator of the Charles Darwin museum there. He had married in 1933 Gladys Gwendoline Jones, the daughter of a civil engineer. They had two sons. He died in 1983.
