= John Tweedy =

British surgeon (1849–1924)

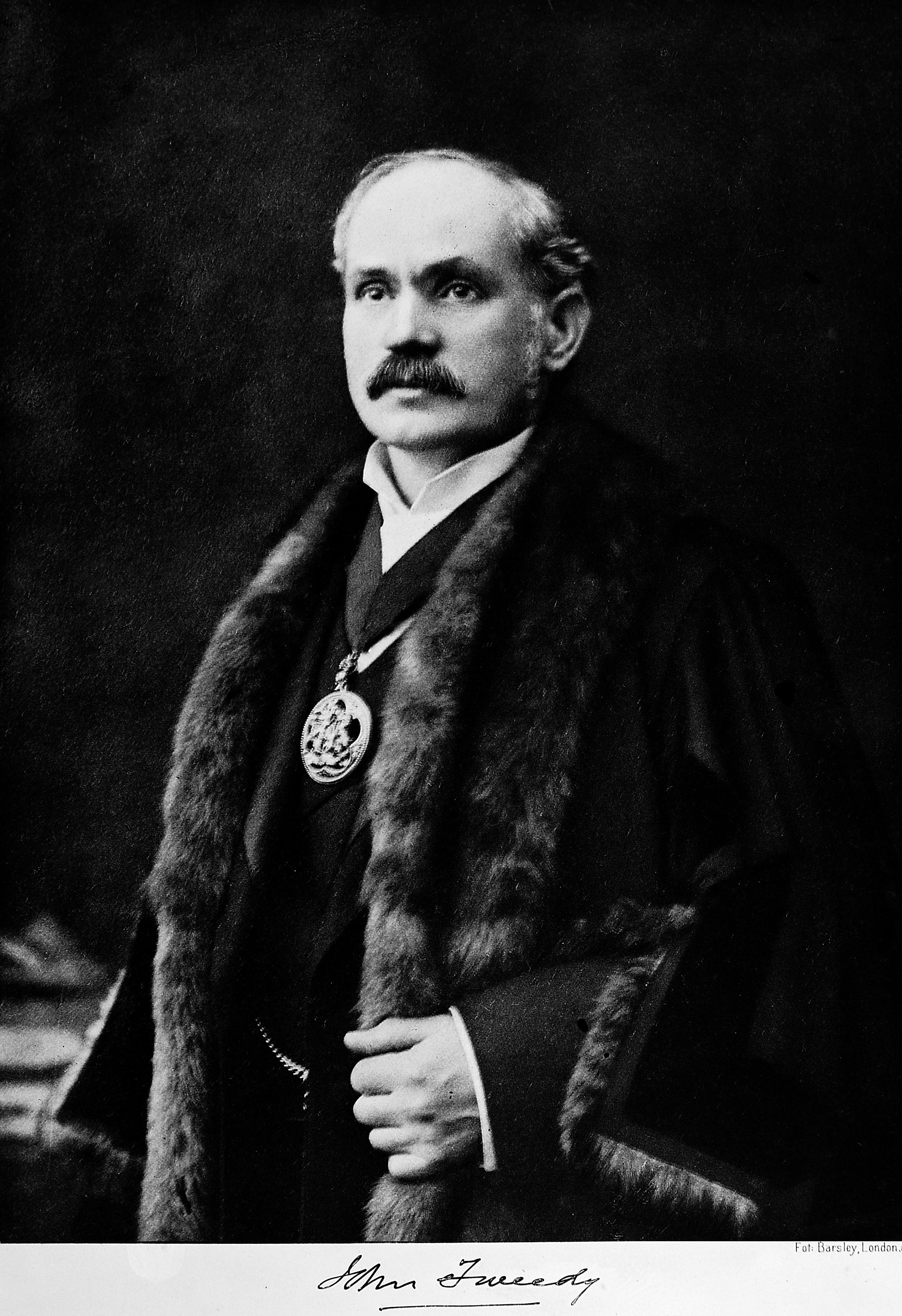

Sir John Tweedy (21 May 1849 – 1924) was an English surgeon and a Fellow of the Royal College of Surgeons.

He was born at Stockton-on-Tees, the son of John Tweedy, a wholesale fruiterer. (Other sources say he was the son of a solicitor.) He was educated at Stockton Collegiate School under Charles James Cooke and then at Elmfield College for a period of two years and 9 months where he received a good classical and mathematical education. He read classical Greek and Latin.

He then went to University College, London and University College Hospital to study medicine. He qualified in 1872, and in 1873 became a Clinical Assistant at the Royal London Ophthalmic Hospital, Moorfields, beginning a long association with the institution. He was elected Assistant Surgeon in 1884 and later full Surgeon.

In March 1872, he took LRCP (Licentiate of the Royal College of Physicians, a qualification awarded historically, since replaced with the MRCP) and took an editorial post at The Lancet for a period of twelve years. In 1876 he was elected a Fellow of the Royal College of Surgeons

In 1881, he also became Assistant Ophthalmic Surgeon at University College, London and Professor of Ophthalmic Medicine and Surgery in 1886. On his retirement he was elected Emeritus Professor of Ophthalmology at the College and Consulting Surgeon to the Hospital.

In 1905, he gave the Hunterian oration at the Royal College of Surgeons and in his later years was one of the Hunterian Collection trustees. In 1905 he was awarded an honorary fellowship of the Royal College of Surgeons of Edinburgh during the College's 400th anniversary celebrations.

He married Mary Hilhouse, daughter of Richard Hilhouse and had a daughter and two sons, Roger and Wharton.

- 1892 – Member of the council of the Royal College of Surgeons
- 1899 – Junior Vice-President
- 1902 – Senior Vice-President
- 1903 – President of the Ophthalmological Society of the United Kingdom
- 1903–1905 – President of the Royal College of Surgeons
- 1904 – Representative of the College of Surgeons on the Courts of Governors of the Universities of Sheffield and Liverpool
- 1906 – Received knighthood and an LLD from the University of Edinburgh
- 1919 – Published two essays "The Medical Tradition" and "The Surgical Tradition"
