= Norman Stanley Williams =

British surgeon (born 1947)

Sir Norman Stanley Williams FRCS FRCP FRCPE FMedSci FRCA
- Born: 15 March 1947 (age 79); Leeds, West Yorkshire; United Kingdom
- Citizenship: United Kingdom
- Education: Barts and The London School of Medicine and Dentistry; University of California, Los Angeles
- Occupation: Surgeon
- Known for: President of the Royal College of Surgeons of England 2011–14

Sir Norman Stanley Williams (born 15 March 1947) is a British surgeon and former President of the Royal College of Surgeons of England (2011–14).

== Early life and education ==
Born in Leeds, he was educated at Roundhay School, Leeds, and at the London Hospital Medical College (University of London). He attended the University of California, Los Angeles (UCLA), as a Fulbright scholar in 1980.

== Professional career ==
In 1982, he was appointed Seior Lecturer/Honorary Consultant Surgeon at the University of Leeds and the Leeds General Infirmary. He subsequently was appointed to the Chair of Surgery at his alma mater in 1986 and in 1995 became the Head of the merged Academic Department of Surgery of Barts and The London School of Medicine and Dentistry, Queen Mary, University of London and Honorary Consultant Colorectal Surgeon at The Royal London Hospital.

His main clinical interests have revolved around sphincter saving procedures and his scientific endeavours have concentrated on gastrointestinal pathophysiology.

He is senior editor of the 27th Edition of Bailey and Love's Short Practice of Surgery (having co-edited 5 previous editions), co-author of Surgery of the Anus, Rectum and Colon now in its 4th Edition and is a founding trustee, chairman and now President of Bowel & Cancer Research.

He has been President of the Society of Academic & Research Surgery, President of The Ileostomy & Internal Pouch Support Group, Chair of the UKCCCR committee on Colorectal Cancer, President of European Digestive Surgery, President of The International Surgical Group and Vice Chair of The British Journal of Surgery.

He was a member of the Secretary of State for Health's Transparency Group (2014–15), chaired the European Working Time Regulations Taskforce (2013–14), co-chaired the Duty of Candour Review (2014) and was the Medical Advisor to Sir Robert Francis’ Freedom to Speak Up Review (2014–15).

He was Chair of Health Education England's Commission on Training for Patient Safety (2015–16) and Chair of NHS England's National Patient Safety Collaborative (2014–16).

In October 2015, he was appointed senior clinical adviser to the then Secretary of State Jeremy Hunt.

During this period he chaired a Rapid Review of Gross Negligence Manslaughter in Healthcare commissioned by Her Majesty's Government which reported in June 2018.

Between 2016 and 2019, he was a Non Executive Director at St George's NHS Foundation Trust and is at present Chair of the National Clinical Improvement Programme (NCIP) which is an integral part of the Getting Right First Time (GIRFT) initiative, Chair of the Independent Reconfiguration Panel (IRP) and a board member of the Private Healthcare Information Network (PHIN).

== Honors and awards ==
Williams was elected a Fellow of the Academy of Medical Sciences in 2004. He was knighted in the 2015 New Year Honours.

=== Awards ===
- Patey Prize of the Surgical Research Society (1978).
- The Moynihan Travelling Fellowship (1985)
- The Society of Authors’ Prize (1995)
- The Nessim-Habif World Prize, University of Geneva (1995)
- The Galen Medal of the Worshipful Company of Apothecaries (2003)
- The Cutler's Surgical Prize (jointly in 2011).
