= Frederick Fagge =

English cricketer and clergyman

John Frederick Fagge (5 October 1814 – 30 March 1884) was an English clergyman who played first-class cricket between 1833 and 1853. He was born at Chartham in Kent in 1814, the fourth son of Sir John Fagge, the 6th of the Fagge baronets who was also the vicar of Chartham.

Fagge was educated at University College, Oxford. He became a Church of England priest and was curate and then vicar of Aston Cantlow in Warwickshire from 1849 to 1876. In 1844 he married Rose Baker. His first wife, with whom he had three children, died in 1859 and he was remarried in 1861 to Jesse Clark with whom he had another six children. In 1877 he converted to the Roman Catholic church.

Fagge played cricket as an amateur, making his first-class debut in 1833 for the Gentlemen of Kent. He went on to play for a range of teams including Oxford University, Marylebone Cricket Club (MCC) and the Gentlemen as well as making an appearance for an England team in 1833. He played for Kent both before the formation of the county club in 1842 and later for the first Kent County Cricket Club. He appeared in a total of 44 first-class matches as a right-handed batsman who bowled right arm roundarm medium pace. He made his final first-class appearance in 1853.

He died at Chartham in 1884 aged 69.

== Bibliography ==
- Carlaw, Derek (2020). Kent County Cricketers, A to Z: Part One (1806–1914) (PDF). Cardiff: ACS.
