= Henry Cline =

British surgeon

Henry Cline (1750–1827) was an English surgeon and president of the Royal College of Surgeons. He was also a political radical, associated with leading supporters of the French Revolution, a farmer, and a Fellow of the Royal Society. He was President of the Medical and Chirurgical Society of London in 1815.

== Life ==
Cline was born in London, and was educated at Merchant Taylors' School. At the age of seventeen he was apprenticed to Thomas Smith, one of the surgeons to St. Thomas's Hospital, and before the end of his apprenticeship he frequently lectured for Joseph Else, then lecturer on anatomy.

On 2 June 1774 Cline obtained his diploma from Surgeons' Hall. In the same year he attended a course of John Hunter's lectures, and was much influenced by it. When Else died in 1781, Cline bought his preparations from his executors, and was appointed to lecture on anatomy. Three years later, on the death of his old master Smith, Cline succeeded him in the surgeoncy of St. Thomas's. After a residence of some years in St. Mary Axe, he moved in 1796 to Lincoln's Inn Fields, where he remained for the rest of his life.

In 1796 Cline was elected a member of the court of assistants of the Surgeons' Company; but his election having taken place at a meeting when neither of the two governors was present (one having just died), was found to have voided the act of incorporation. After failure of a bill to legalise the surgeons' proceedings, in 1800 they were incorporated by charter as the Royal College of Surgeons, the old municipal privileges being given up. He was elected a Fellow of the Royal Society in 1806.

In 1808 Cline bought some land at Bound's Green in Middlesex, and visited it regularly, becoming greatly interested in agriculture, and losing much time and money in its pursuit, according to Astley Cooper, his pupil. When he was sixty years old his practice brought him about £10,000 per annum; but it was Cooper's opinion that, it would have been much more had he not been so fond of politics and farming. In 1810 Cline became an examiner at the College of Surgeons, and in the following year resigned his appointments at St. Thomas's. His pupils subscribed for a bust by Francis Leggatt Chantrey, which was placed in St. Thomas's Museum.

In 1815 he became master of the College of Surgeons, and in 1816 and 1824 delivered the Hunterian oration. In 1823 Cline was president of the college, the title having been changed from that of master in 1821. He died on 2 January 1827.

== Views and associations ==
Cline was an adherent of John Horne Tooke, attending him professionally when in the Tower of London, and afterwards in his last illness. For many years he gave an anniversary dinner to Tooke's friends and supporters at his own house, in commemoration of Tooke's acquittal. He was also a friend of John Thelwall. He was in favour of the French Revolution, and by his influence with leading men in Paris secured Astley Cooper's safety during a three months' residence there in 1792. Cline thought there was a cause superior to man, but believed that nothing was known of the future.

== Works ==
His only publication was a small brochure on the Form of Animals, 1805; twice reprinted, 1808 and 1829.

== Family ==
In 1775 Cline took a house in Devonshire Street, and married Miss Webb, lecturing on the day of his marriage. Cline was succeeded in the surgeoncy to St. Thomas's and in the lectures on anatomy and surgery by his son Henry Cline, who died on 27 May 1820 of phthisis.
