= Reginald Murley =

British surgeon (1916–1997)

Sir Reginald Sydney Murley KBE TD FRCS (2 August 1916 – 2 October 1997) was a British surgeon who was President of the Royal College of Surgeons.

Reginald Murley was a breast cancer biological predeterminist, alongside Maurice Black and Neil McKinnon in the 1950s—recognizing that breast cancer is a systemic (not local) disease at the outset. Also a pioneer of breast conservation (vs radical mastectomy) in Britain, contemporary of George Crile Jr. [reference: ‘The Breast Cancer Wars’, Barron H Lerner MD, 2001].

Academic offices
Preceded by Rodney Smith	President of the Royal College of Surgeons of England; 1977–1980	Succeeded by Sir Alan Parks
