= John Bishop (surgeon) =

English surgeon (1797–1873)

John Bishop, FRS, FRCS (15 September 1797 – 29 September 1873) was an English surgeon and medical writer. He studied at St. George's Hospital; obtained the Diploma of Royal College of Surgeons in 1824; was senior surgeon to the Islington dispensary, and surgeon to the Northern and St. Pancras dispensaries. He also wrote surgical works.

== Life ==
John Bishop was the fourth son of Samuel Bishop, of Pimperne, Dorsetshire. He was born on 15 September 1797, and he received his education at the grammar school at Childe Okeford in Dorsetshire, where he remained for several years.

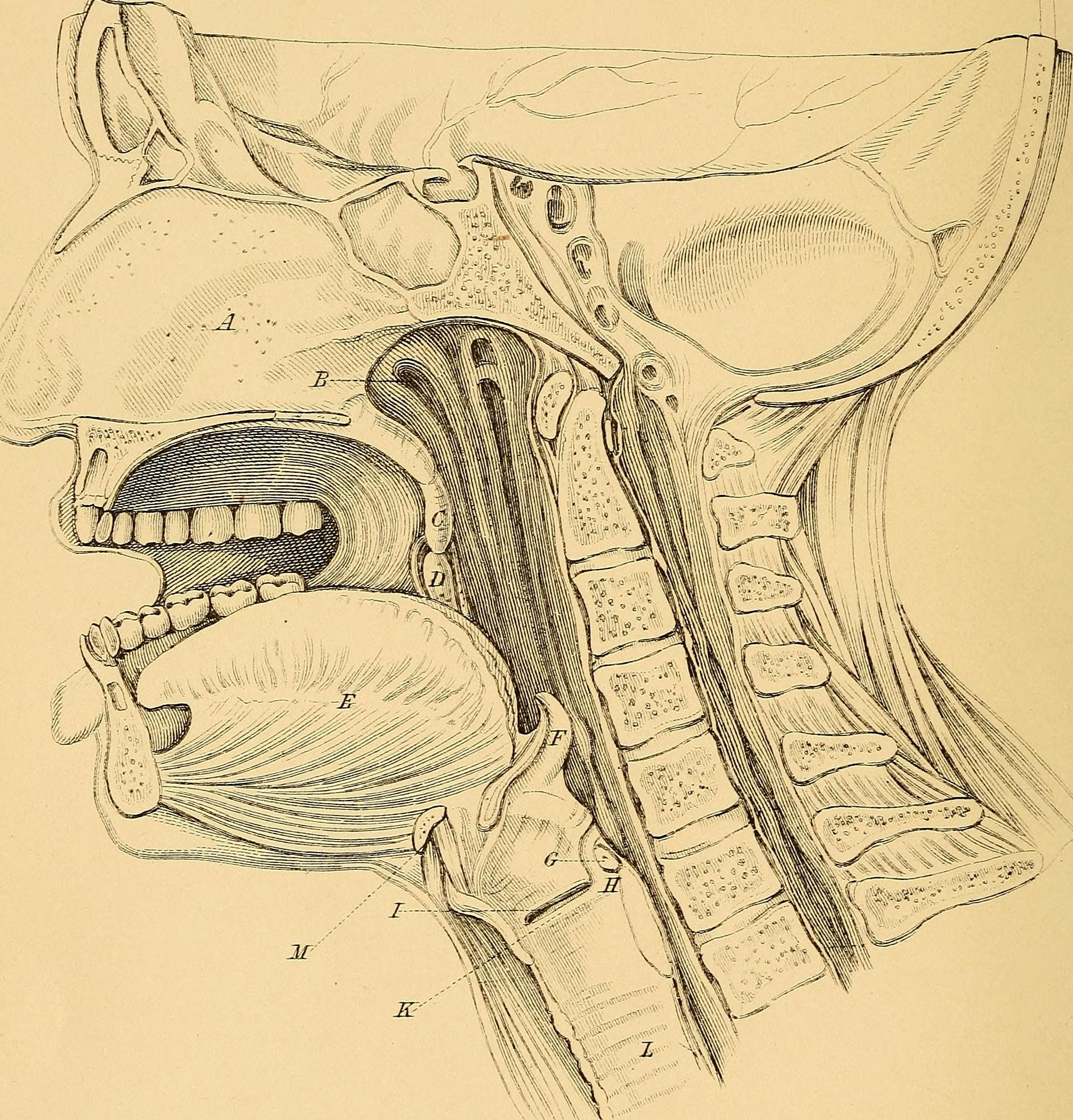
A Mesial Section of the Vocal Organs

Bishop was originally intended for the legal profession, but this intention was never carried out, and for many years he led the life of a country gentleman. When about twenty-five years of age Bishop was induced by his cousin, John Tucker of Bridport, to enter the medical profession. After a short preliminary practice, under the direction of his relative, at Bridport, he came to London and entered at St. George's Hospital under Sir Everard Home. While studying in this hospital Bishop attended the lectures of Sir Charles Bell, of George James Guthrie, and George Pearson, and he was a regular attendant at the chemical courses which were delivered at the Royal Institution. In 1824 he obtained the diploma of the Royal College of Surgeons, and entered regularly into his profession. He soon acquired a reputation as a careful and skilful observer. This secured for him the offices of senior surgeon to the Islington dispensary, and surgeon to the Northern and St. Pancras dispensaries, and to the Drapers' Benevolent Institution.

In 1844 Bishop contributed a paper to the Philosophical Transactions of the Royal Society, on the Physiology of the Human Voice. He was shortly afterwards elected a Fellow of the Royal Society, and a corresponding member of the medical societies of Berlin and Madrid. The Royal Academy of Science of Paris awarded him two prizes for memoirs On the Human and Comparative Anatomy and Physiology of Voice. He was the author of a work On Distortions of the Human Body, another On Impediments of Speech, and one On Hearing and Speaking Instruments. These works were remarkable for the careful examinations which the author had made on the subjects under investigation, and for the mathematical demonstration given of each theory advanced by him. Bishop contributed several articles to Bentley Todd's Cyclopædia of Anatomy and Physiology, and many papers of more or less importance to the medical literature of the day.

Bishop was a man of varied attainments; he was conversant with continental as well as English literature, and to within a few months of his death he was deeply interested in the progress of science. On 29 September 1873 he died at Strangeways-Marshale, Dorsetshire, within a few miles of his birthplace.

== Publications ==
- On the Physiology of the Human Voice. London: R. and J. E. Taylor, 1846.
- On Articulate Sounds; and on the Causes and Cure of Impediments of Speech. London: S. Highley, 1851.
- Researches Into the Pathology and Treatment of Deformities in the Human Body. London: Highley and Son, 1852 (London: Wilson and Ogilvy).
- Lettsomian Lectures on the Physical Constitution, Diseases, and Fractures of Bones. London: Samuel Highley, 1855.
- Chowne, W. D. Experimental Researches on the Movement of Atmospheric Air in Tubes. [London]: [publisher not identified], [1855].
- On the Construction of Hearing and Speaking Instruments. London: Taylor and Francis, [1856].
- On the Causes and Treatment of Impediments of Speech; Including the Theory of Articulate Sounds, and on the Construction of Hearing and Speaking Instruments. London: J. Churchill, 1856.
- Untersuchungen über das Wesen und die Behandlung der Deformitäten des menschlichen Körpers. Stettin: Th. von der Nahmer, 1856 (Stettin: F. Wenning).

== Sources ==
- Hunt, Robert; Kerslake, Christian (2004). "Bishop, John (1797–1873), surgeon". Oxford Dictionary of National Biography (online ed.). Oxford University Press. doi:10.1093/ref:odnb/2472. (Subscription, Wikipedia Library access or UK public library membership required.)

Attribution:

- This article incorporates text from a publication now in the public domain: Hunt, Robert (1886). "Bishop, John (1797-1873)". In Stephen, Leslie (ed.). Dictionary of National Biography. Vol. 5. London: Smith, Elder & Co. p. 95.
