= Henry Howse =

English surgeon (1841–1914)

Sir Henry Greenway Howse
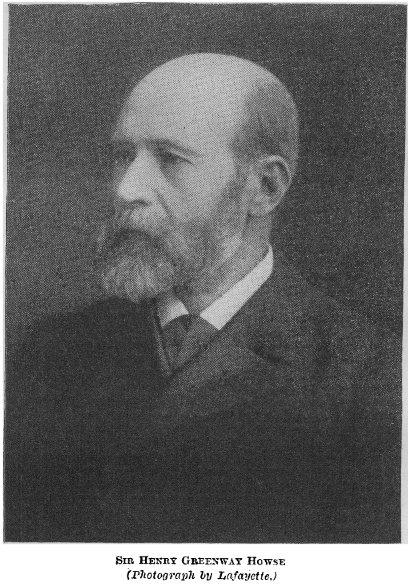
- Sir Henry Greenway Howse
- Born: 21 December 1841; Bath, England
- Died: 15 September 1914 (aged 72); Sevenoaks, England
- Education: Guy's
- Occupation: Surgeon
- Known for: Antiseptic orthopaedic surgery
- Medical career
- Profession: General Surgeon
- Institutions: London University, Guy's
- Awards: Hunterian Oration, Knighthood, Bradshaw Lecture

Sir Henry Greenway Howse FRCS (21 December 1841 – 15 September 1914) was an English surgeon, sometime President of the Royal College of Surgeons.

== Life ==
Henry Greenway Howse was born in Lyncombe Hall, Bath (England) to Henry Edward Howse and Isabella Howse (née Weald). He entered an apprenticeship in Reading at age 18 before commencing training at Guy's Hospital at age 20.

He had subsequent appointments at London University as a demonstrator in anatomy, before returning to Guy's as a member of staff as a surgery lecturer.

In 1881, he married a Miss Marshall, daughter of Thomas Lethbridge Marshall (a Unitarian minister at the New Gravel Pit Chapel); they subsequently had three daughters and one son.

His contributions include the development of new methods for preserving anatomical specimens for teaching (using a mixture of glycerine and arsenic), introducing histology (rather than just gross anatomy) as a part of the training for surgeons, propagating the antiseptic methods of Lister and knee surgery, although his surgical practice was very broad. He wasn't a prolific author, but did write entries for Heath's Dictionary of Practical Surgery and as an Editor for Guy's Hospital Reports.

For the Royal College of Surgeons he was vice-president (1897–1900) then president (1901–1903). He was knighted in the 1902 Coronation Honours list, receiving the accolade from King Edward VII at Buckingham Palace on 24 October that year.

== Honours ==
- Bradshaw Lecture – 1899
- Knighthood – 1902
- Hunterian Oration – 1903
