= Rodney Smith, Baron Smith =

British surgeon

Edwin Rodney Smith, Baron Smith KBE FRCS (10 May 1914 – 1 July 1998) was a British surgeon.

He was appointed a Knight Commander of the Order of the British Empire (KBE) in the 1975 New Year Honours and created a life peer as Baron Smith, of Marlow in the County of Buckinghamshire on 8 July 1978. He served as president of the Royal Society of Medicine between 1978 and 1980.

He was a strong bridge player.

Coat of arms of Rodney Smith, Baron Smith

Crest
An eagle close reguardant Sable beaked and legged Or holding in the dexter claw a bugle horn Or by its strings Sable.
Escutcheon
Gules in chief two fleams the blades outwards and in base a lyre Or a border Ermine.
Supporters
Dexter a Burmese cat, sinister a greyhound Sable, both collared Or each collar charged with a thistle Proper.
Motto
Satis Optima Adpetisse

Academic offices
Preceded by Sir Edward Muir	President of the Royal College of Surgeons of England; 1973–1977	Succeeded by Sir Reginald Murley
