= John Painter Vincent =

English surgeon

John Painter Vincent (1776–1852) was an English surgeon.

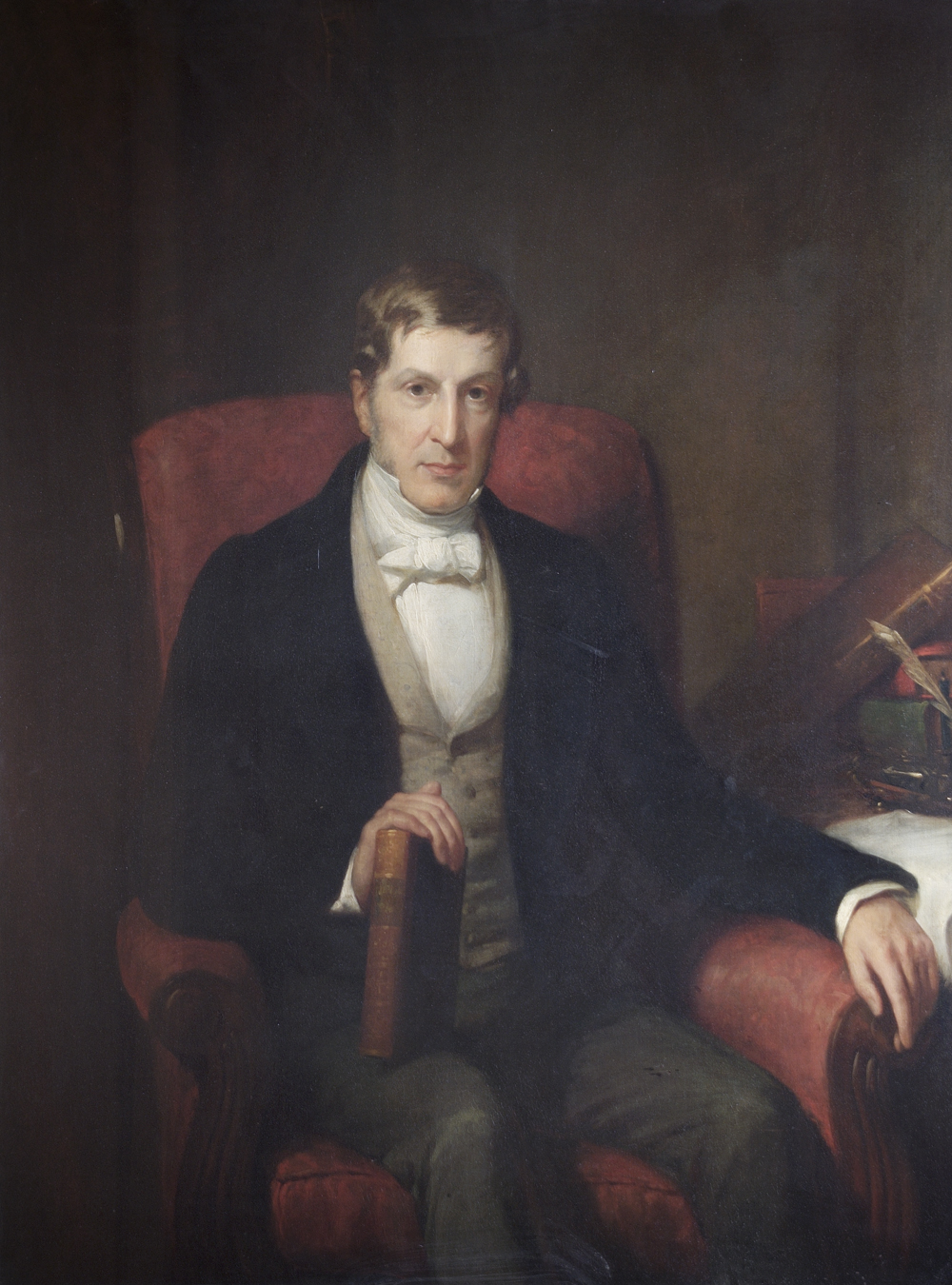
John Painter Vincent, portrait by Eden Upton Eddis

== Life ==
Born at Newbury, Berkshire, he was the son of Osman Vincent, silk merchant and banker, who lived at Donnington; Richard Budd Vincent was his brother. John was apprenticed to Mr. Long, surgeon to Christ's Hospital from 1790 to 1807, and lived in Lincoln's Inn Fields. At this period of his life he attended James Leigh Hunt.

Vincent was admitted a member of the Corporation of Surgeons in 1800, and he became a member of the newly incorporated College of Surgeons on 20 March 1800. He then took his master's house in Lincoln's Inn Fields. He was elected assistant surgeon to St. Bartholomew's Hospital on 13 August 1807, becoming full surgeon 29 January 1816. On 22 July 1822 he was elected a member of the council of the Royal College of Surgeons, and on 5 January 1828 he succeeded to the court of examiners in place of Thompson Forster. He delivered the Hunterian oration in 1829, and he served the office of vice-president in 1830, 1831, 1838, and 1839, and of president of the Royal College of Surgeons in 1832 and 1840. He was elected a fellow of the college in 1843.

Vincent fell into poor health, and resigned his post of surgeon to St. Bartholomew's Hospital on 21 January 1847, when he was appointed a governor of the hospital; he retained his college offices until 1851. He died of paralysis at Woodlands Manor, near Sevenoaks, on 17 July 1852, and was buried in the church he had built at Woodlands. Vincent tended to avoid operations unless they were absolutely necessary.

== Works ==
Vincent published Hunterian Oration, London, 1829; and Observations on some Parts of Surgical Practice, London, 1847.

== Family ==
Vincent married, on 28 May 1812, Maria, daughter of Samuel Parke of Kensington, by whom he had six children, of whom three sons survived him. She died in October 1824, and he then married Elizabeth Mary Williams, who outlived him.

== Notes ==
Attribution

This article incorporates text from a publication now in the public domain: Lee, Sidney, ed. (1899). "Vincent, John Painter". Dictionary of National Biography. Vol. 58. London: Smith, Elder & Co.
