= George Makins =

English surgeon (1853–1933)

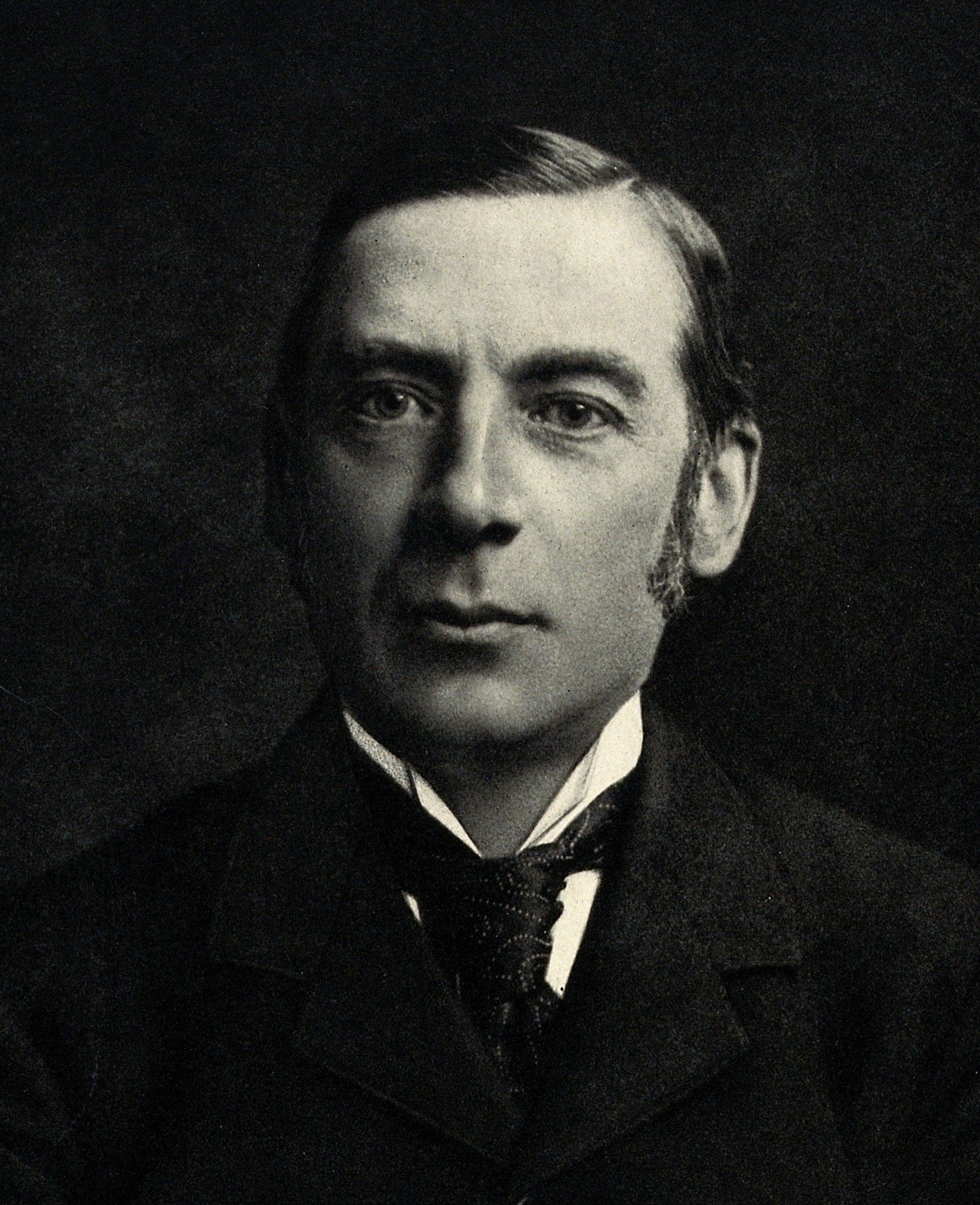
George Henry Makins

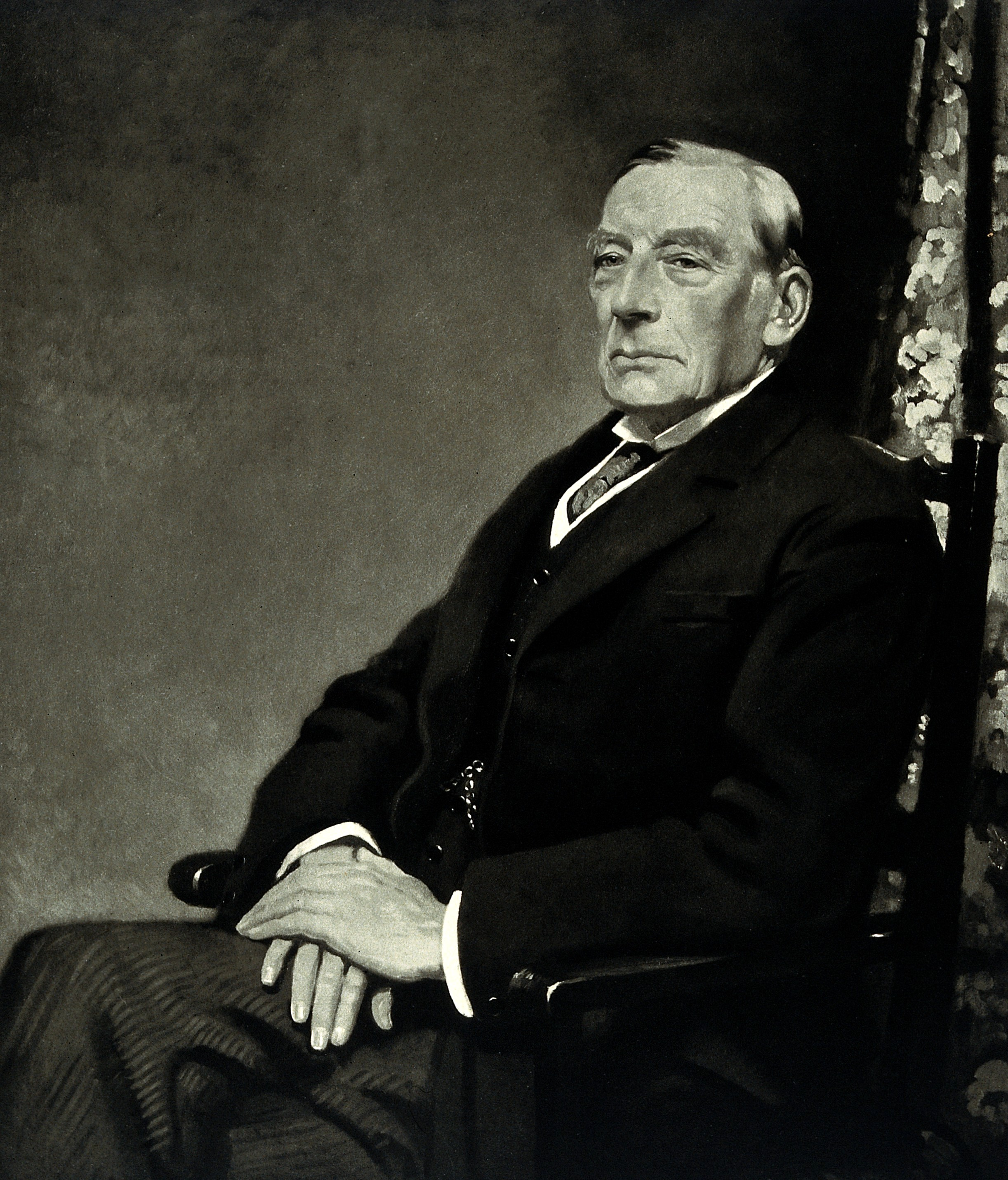
George Henry Makins

Sir George Henry Makins GCMG CB FRCS (3 November 1853 – 2 November 1933) was an English surgeon.

He was born in St Albans, Hertfordshire, the son of George Hogarth Makins, MRCS, and educated at The King's School, Gloucester, St Thomas' Hospital and Halle, Vienna.

He was appointed resident Assistant Surgeon at St Thomas' Hospital (1880–85), then Surgical Registrar (1885–87), Assistant Surgeon (1888–1898) and full Surgeon (1898-1913). He was also Assistant Surgeon at the Evelina Hospital for Sick Children (the forerunner of Evelina Children's Hospital).

During wartime Makins was a Consulting Surgeon to the South African Field Force, 1899-1900 and again a Consulting Surgeon, alongside Sir Anthony Bowlby, during the First World War, 1914-18. He spent much of the latter conflict in France, working in hospitals in Paris and Boulogne before taking over the supervision of new hospitals at Camiers and Étaples, where he established a research centre to trial new methods of wound treatment.

He was a Fellow of the Royal College of Surgeons, gave the Bradshaw Lecture in 1913, the Hunterian Oration in 1917 and served as President from 1917 to 1919. He was awarded CB in 1900, GCMG in 1918 and KCMG in 1915.

He died at his London home on 2 November 1933 and was buried in Kensal Green Cemetery. He had married Margaret Augusta née Kirkland, the widow of General Fellowes. They had no children.

== Published work ==
- Surgical experiences in South Africa, 1899-1900. London, 1901; 2nd edition, 1913.
- A case of artificial anus treated by resection of the small intestine. St Thos. Hosp. Rep. 1884, 13, 181.
- Rickets, in Treves, System of surgery, 1895, 1, 363.
- Surgical diseases due to microbic infection and parasites. Ibid. 1895, 1, 294.
- Injuries of the joints; dislocations, in Warren and Gould, International text-book of surgery, 1899, 1, 589.
- Gunshot injuries of the arteries (Bradshaw lecture, R.C.S.). London, 1914.
- On gunshot injuries to the blood-vessels, founded on experience gained in France during the great war 1914-1918. Bristol, 1919.
- Operative surgery of the stomach, with B. G. A. Moynihan. London, 1912.
- The influence exerted by the military experience of John Hunter on himself and the military surgeon of today. (Hunterian oration, R.C.S.). Lancet, 1917, 1, 249.

== See also ==
- List of honorary medical staff at King Edward VII's Hospital for Officers
