= Frederic Carpenter Skey =

English surgeon

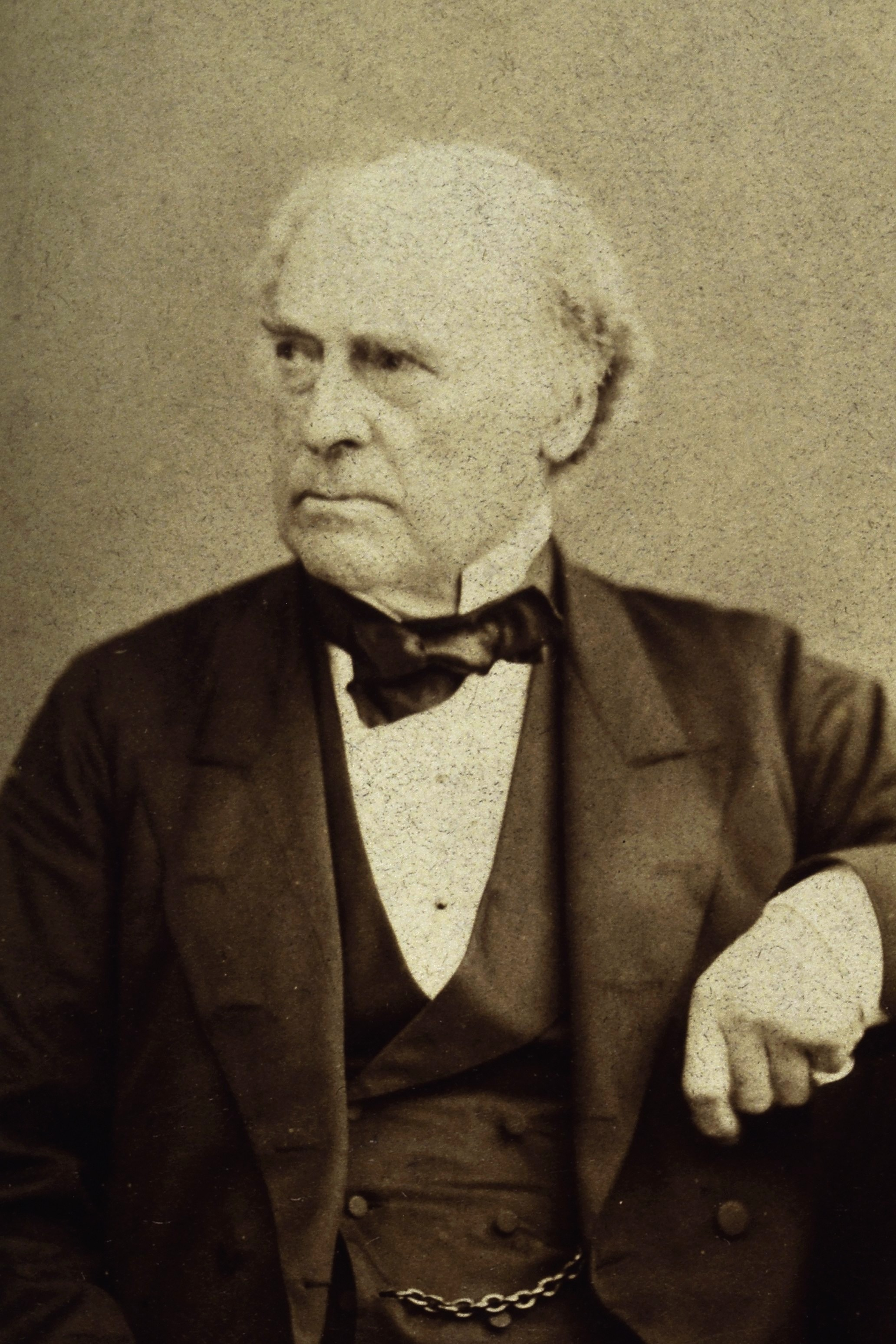
Frederic Carpenter Skey

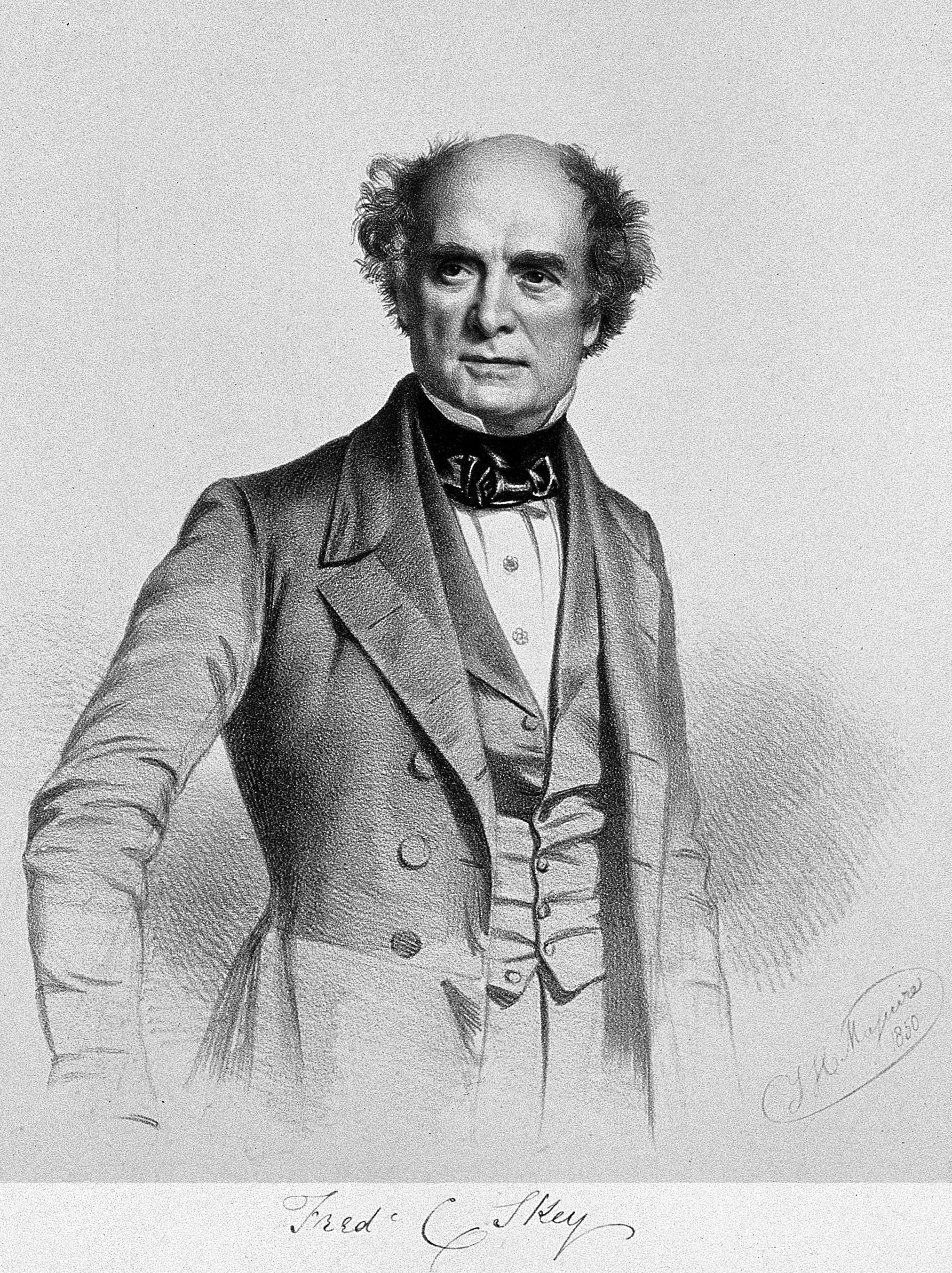
Frederic Carpenter Skey, 1850 lithograph

Frederic Carpenter Skey FRS (1 December 1798 – 15 August 1872) was an English surgeon.

== Life ==
He was the second of six children of George Skey, a Russian merchant in London, and was born at Upton-on-Severn on 1 December 1798. He was educated chiefly at the private school of Michael Maurice, father of Frederick Denison Maurice, whose friendship he retained until his death. After a short stay at Plymouth with his cousin, Dr. Joseph Skey, then inspector-general of army hospitals, Skey began his medical education at Edinburgh, and then spent a few months in Paris. He was apprenticed to John Abernethy on 15 April 1816.

After studying at St. Bartholomew's Hospital, Skey was admitted a member of the Royal College of Surgeons of England on 5 April 1822. While he was an apprentice, Skey was entrusted with the care of some private patients. By Abernethy's interest he was appointed demonstrator of anatomy at St. Bartholomew's Hospital about 1826, an office he resigned after Abernethy's death in 1831, in consequence of a dispute with Sir William Lawrence.

An outcome of Skey's separation from the teaching staff of St. Bartholomew's Hospital was the revival of the Aldersgate Street school of medicine. In the hands of James Hope, Robert Bentley Todd, Marshall Hall, and Jonathan Pereira, it became known as a private teaching establishment, and for many years rivalled the neighbouring school of St. Bartholomew's Hospital. Skey taught surgery in the Aldersgate Street school for ten years, though he was elected an assistant-surgeon to St. Bartholomew's Hospital on 29 August 1827, and consulting surgeon to the London Charterhouse in the same year.

Skey was elected a fellow of the Royal Society in 1837, and he was appointed to lecture on anatomy in the medical school of St. Bartholomew's Hospital in 1843, an office he resigned in 1865. He became full surgeon to the hospital in May 1854, but in consequence of a new rule calling on members of the staff to retire on attaining the age of 65, he relinquished the post on 18 January 1864. He was then elected consulting surgeon, and was presented with a testimonial.

Skey filled major positions in the Royal College of Surgeons. Elected a member of the council in 1848, he was appointed Hunterian orator in 1850, and in 1852 was made professor of human anatomy and surgery. He was elected a member of the court of examiners in 1855, and in 1863 he was chosen president. In 1859 he served the office of president of the Royal Medical and Chirurgical Society, and in 1864, at the instigation of his friend and patient, Benjamin Disraeli, he was appointed chairman at the Admiralty of the first parliamentary committee to inquire into the best mode of treating venereal disease in the army and navy. He received a C.B. for his services in this capacity, and the direct outcome of the committee's report was the framing of the Contagious Diseases Act, which has since been repealed. His health failed during the last two or three years of his life, and he died at his rooms in Mount Street, Grosvenor Square, on 15 August 1872.

== Works ==
Skey published, besides pamphlets and a series of letters to The Times on the effects of severe training for athletic sports:

- Operative Surgery, London, 1851; 2nd edit. 1858; influenced throughout by the author's protest against the use of the knife except as a last resource.
- Hysteria, &c., London, 1867; 2nd edit. 1867; 3rd edit. 1870; a series of lectures in which the advantages of the "tonic" plan of treatment over the use of depleting measures are maintained.
