= List of Welsh medical pioneers =

This page lists pioneers and innovators in healthcare either in Wales or by Welsh people, including in medicine, surgery and health policy.

== Medical pioneers ==
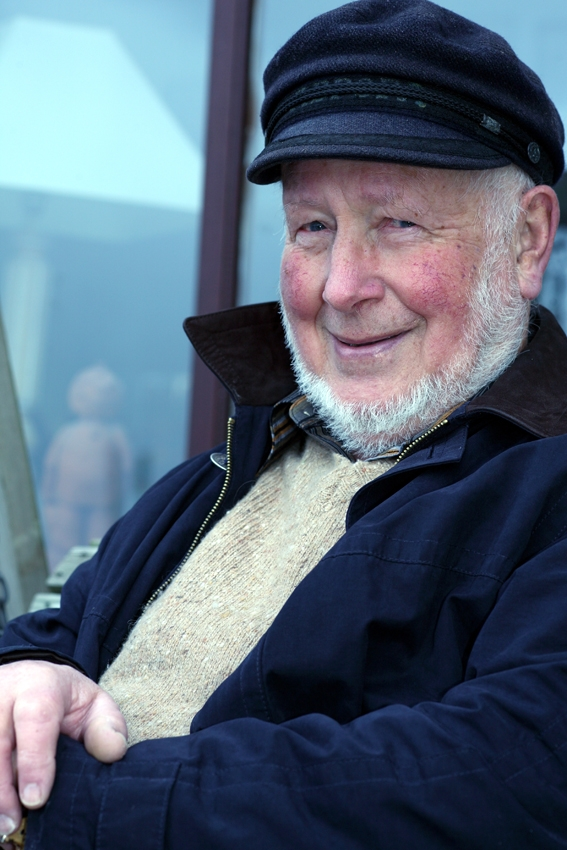
Julian Tudor-Hart, general practitioner

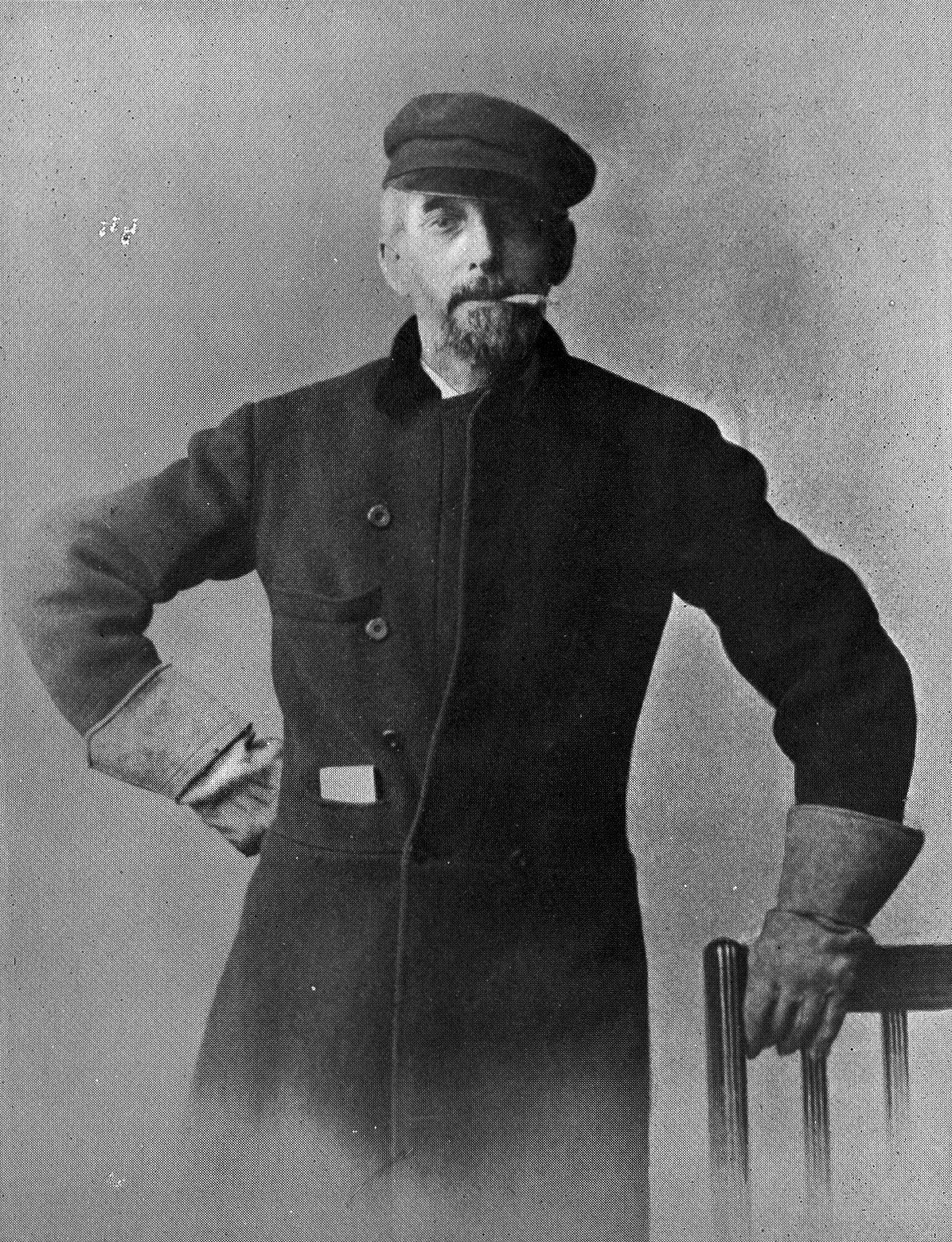
Hugh Owen Thomas, orthopaedic surgeon

- George Owen Rees (1813–1889), the first to analyse the chemistry of urine and also did new work on the nature and shape of the blood corpuscles.
- George Edward Day (1815–1872), reformed to medical examinations
- William Roberts (1830–1899), introduced the term Antagonism into microbiology and one of the first to describe the action of antibiotics including penicillin
- Frances Hoggan (1843–1927), various research including the anatomy and physiology of lymph nodes
- Robert Armstrong-Jones (1857–1943), instituted special training for mental health nurses and occupational therapy for patients, and developed modern methods to treat mental diseases
- Llewellyn Jones Llewellyn (1871–1934), an authority on rheumatism and related diseases
- Thomas Lewis (1881–1945), pioneer cardiologist and clinical scientist
- William Evans (1895–1988), cardiology; description of the anatomy of coarctation of the aorta; controls in drug trials; studies on electrocardiography; first accurate description of ‘familial cardiomegaly’
- Horace Evans (1903–1963), linked hypertension and nephritis
- Denis John Williams (1908–1990), did pioneering work on using EEG to study cerebral disease
- John David Spillane (1909–1985), established the modern study of Tropical Neurology
- Eluned Woodford-Williams (1913–1984), established geriatrics as a speciality and began practice of admitting all patients over 65 year old to her unit
- D. Geraint James (1922–2010), classifyied the clinical and radiological features of sarcoidosis
- Julian Tudor-Hart (1927–2018), Local population health and hypertension among other topics
- Keith Peters (born 1938), improved understanding of glomerulonephritis
- Dafydd Stephens (1942–2012), founder of audiological medicine

== Surgical pioneers ==
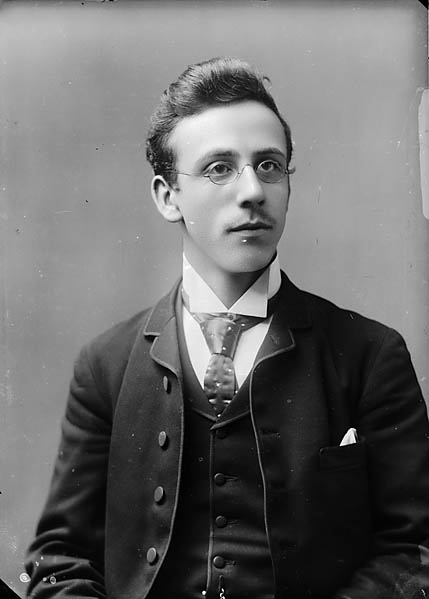
William Thelwall Thomas, general surgeon

- Hugh Owen Thomas (1834–1891), pioneered orthopaedic surgery techniques including the Thomas splint and Thomas test
- Robert Jones (1857–1933), he stablished orthopaedic surgery as a modern speciality. His organisational skills, treatments and rehabilitation of soldiers saved many lives during the first World War. He pioneered the use of radiography and the Jones fracture is named after him
- William Thelwall Thomas (1865–1927), pioneer of abdominal surgery; introducing the detempered needle, the black silkworm gut, and large-handled Spencer Wells forceps. He also introduced the transverse incision for an umbilical hernia repair; introduced the double incision for double renal calculi at the kidney and ureter; and made a significant investigation into the composition of renal calculi
- Tudor Thomas (1893–1976), pioneer of corneal grafting

== Policy ==
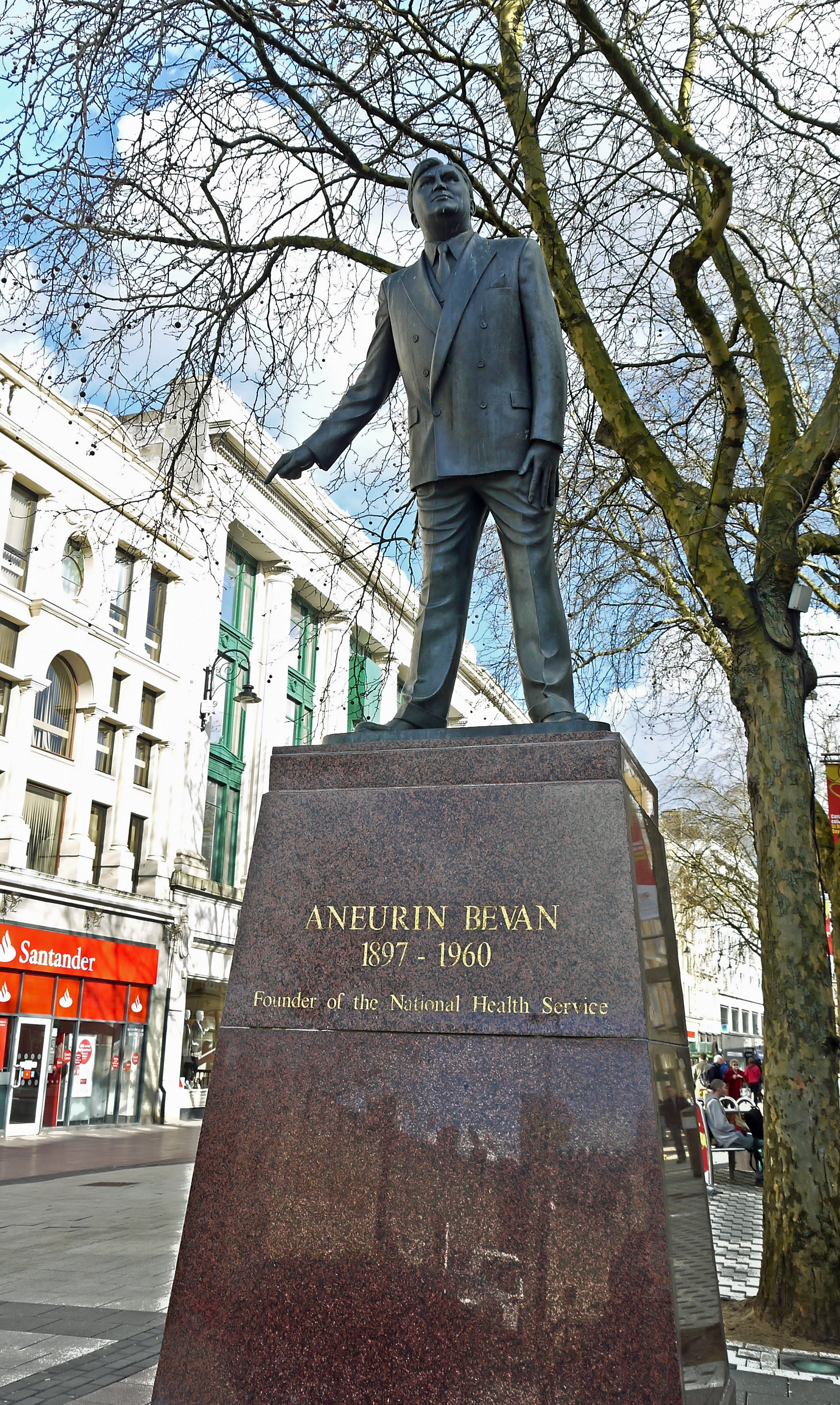
Aneurin Bevan statue, Cardiff.

- Frances Hoggan (1843–1927), first Welsh female physician and advocated for gender equality in medicine
- David Lloyd George (1863–1945), the National Insurance Act 1911.
- Mary Morris (1873–1925), first woman to train as a doctor at the University College of Wales, Aberystwyth, admitted in 1895. Possibly the first woman to train in medicine in Wales.
- Aneurin Bevan (1897–1960), creation of the National Health Service.
- Eluned Woodford-Williams (1913–1984), influenced government policy on geriatrics, improving geriatric services
- Julian Tudor-Hart (1927–2018), social advocate and devised the term Inverse care law
- Timothy Stamps (1936–2017), reformed and improved Zimbabwe's healthcare system.
- Ilora Finlay (born 1949), regulation of smoking, organ donation, sunbeds alcohol pricing, and improvements in palliative care
- Mark Taubert (born 1975), Chair of Advance & Future Care Planning policy for NHS Wales and TalkCPR resources on decisions with regard to cardiopulmonary resuscitation in palliative illness.

== See also ==
- List of Welsh innovations and discoveries
- Medical education in Wales
