= Inverse benefit law =

Drug benefit-harm ratio falls with marketing

The inverse benefit law states that the ratio of benefits to harms among patients taking new drugs tends to vary inversely with how extensively a drug is marketed. Two Americans, Howard Brody and Donald Light, have defined the inverse benefit law, inspired by Tudor Hart's inverse care law.

A drug effective for a serious disorder is less and less effective as it is promoted for milder cases and for other conditions for which the drug was not approved. Although effectiveness becomes more diluted, the risks of harmful side effects persist, and thus the benefit-harm ratio worsens as a drug is marketed more widely. The inverse benefit law highlights the need for comparative effectiveness research and other reforms to improve evidence-based prescribing.

== State of affairs ==
The law is manifested through 6 basic marketing strategies:

- reducing thresholds for diagnosing disease,
- relying on surrogate endpoints,
- exaggerating safety claims,
- exaggerating efficacy claims,
- creating new diseases,
- encouraging unapproved uses.

== Impact ==
This is the reason why organizations like "Worst Pill, Best Pill" recommend not to use/prescribe new medications before being in the market for at least ten years (except in the case of important new drugs that treat previously unsolved problems).

Agencies of drugs, committee of ethics and organizations of patients' safety should consider:

- Requiring that clinical trials run long enough to pick up evidence of side effects and record all adverse reactions, including in subjects who drop out.
- Paying companies more for new drugs in proportion to how much better they are for patients than existing drugs, and marketing according to the value of the new drugs (ratio of benefits to harms and marketing).
- Considering that market could be a force against the best use of medications.

== See also ==
- Disease mongering – Pejorative term for expanding a disease's market for treatment
- Health policy – Policy area that deals with the health system of a country or other organization
- Inverse care law – Adage about availability of health care
- Medicalization – Categorization of human problems as medical
- Patient safety – Prevention, reduction, reporting, and analysis of medical error
- Pharmaceutical industry – Industry involved with discovery, development, production and marketing of drugs
- Pharmaceutical marketing – Advertising by pharmaceutical companies
- Public health – Promoting health through informed choices
- Quaternary prevention
- Medical science liaison

== Bibliography ==
- Light DW (Editor). The Risks of Prescription Drugs. New York: Columbia University Press; 2010.
- Evans I, Thornton H, Chalmers I. Testing Treatments: Better Research for Better Healthcare. London: Pinter & Martin Ltd; 2010.
