= Gobowen =

Village in Shropshire, England

Coordinates: 52.896°N 3.038°W

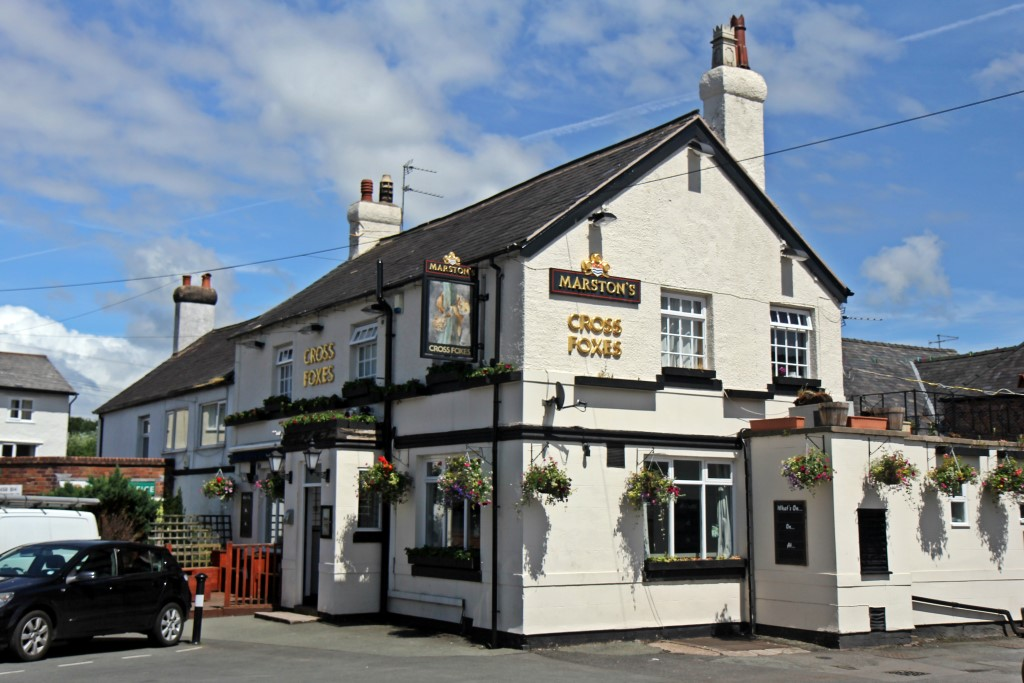
- The Cross Foxes public house, Gobowen

- Location within Shropshire
- Population: 3,270 (2011 Census)
- OS grid reference: SJ301337
- Civil parish: Selattyn and Gobowen
- Unitary authority: Shropshire
- Ceremonial county: Shropshire
- Region: West Midlands
- Country: England
- Sovereign state: United Kingdom
- Post town: OSWESTRY
- Postcode district: SY11
- Dialling code: 01691
- Police: West Mercia
- Fire: Shropshire
- Ambulance: West Midlands
- UK Parliament: North Shropshire

Gobowen /ɡəˈboʊən/ is a village in Shropshire, England, about 2 miles north of Oswestry. The population according to the 2011 census was 3,270.

== History ==
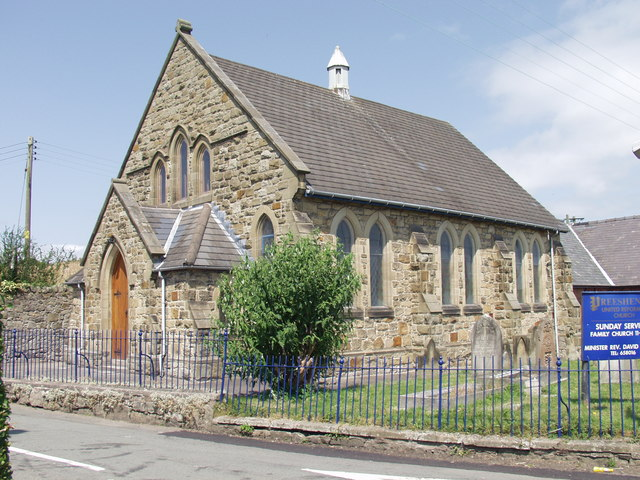
Preeshenlle United Reform Church

The village was previously called Bryn-y-Castell ("Hill of the Castle" in English) after the Norman motte castle adjacent to the Preeshenlle United Reformed Church, the eastern edge of the site being cut into when the church was built. Alongside this monument there is a section of the 8th century Wat's Dyke.

The name changed to Gobowen; this name is believed to originate from Gob (from 'gobennydd', a pillow) and Owen (Owain Glyndŵr) who was believed to have rested here. However, this name may also originate from a man named Owen who started mining here, and an old Welsh word for mine is 'gob', hence Gobowen (Owen's mine). The mines were filled in by hand during the Second World War by displaced persons and prisoners of war, who were housed in a camp which is now called Bank Top Industrial Estate in the nearby village of St Martins.

The population of Gobowen, however, grew up around the railway. The mainline route between Chester and Shrewsbury was diverted through Gobowen after permission was denied to route the railway through the local historic town of Oswestry. Gobowen railway station is a Grade II listed building.

The village's main primary school was opened in 1907, with local educational provision previously being offered at the school hall attached to Preeshenlle United Reform Church.

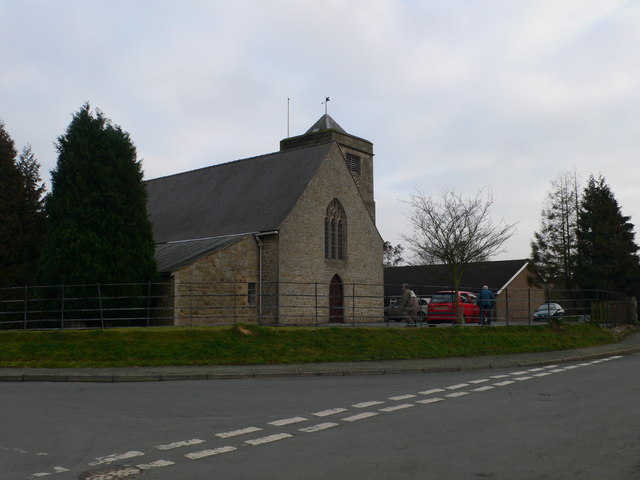
All Saints Church, Gobowen

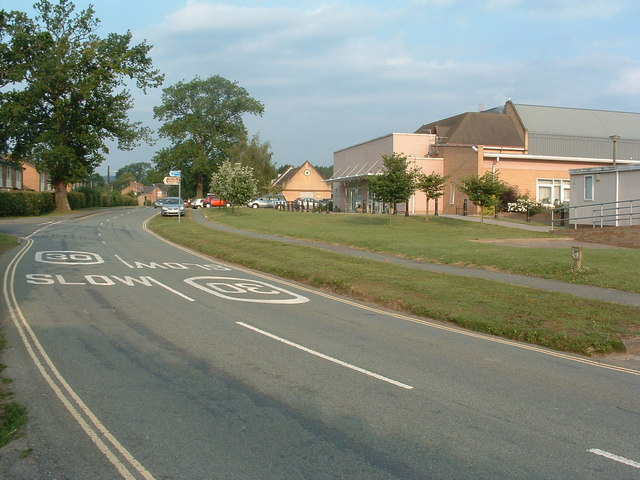
Hospital at Park Hall

=== All Saints Church ===
The Foundation Stone for All Saints Church was laid in 1926 and the memorial to this event can be found on the east end of the building. The church was built as a daughter church to St. Barnabas Church at Hengoed and remained as such until the Hengoed church was made redundant in 1981, at which point All Saints became the parish church for 'Hengoed with Gobowen'. The parish of Hengoed with Gobowen was originally in the Diocese of St Asaph but transferred to the Diocese of Lichfield when the Church in Wales disestablished. All Saints was officially opened in 1928 and its vicar was George Owen Browne, the first of nine vicars to date who have served the parish. Others have included: Bertram Russell, Arthur Cecil Roberts, Glyn Owen Jones, John Michael Allen, Paul Wilkinson, Michael John Withey, Christopher John Groocock and Adrian Richard Bailey (the current vicar). The church was extended variously throughout its history including the extension of the West End, the addition of a second vestry (to the rear) and a bell tower. In 1979, the building was devastated by fire and services continued during that period in the hall next to the Church. It re-opened in 1981 with a newly commissioned stained glass window to the East End, a donated window depicting the nativity in the West End, and various pieces of furniture donated from churches elsewhere.

== Governance ==
Gobowen is part of the electoral ward called Gobowen, Selattyn and Weston Rhyn. This ward had a population of 6,866 at the 2011 Census.

== Amenities and attractions ==
Derwen College, which provides residential further education for students with learning difficulties and disabilities, lies in the village. The college also operates a garden centre, Young Farmers' shop (selling produce grown at the college), coffee shop and restaurant.

The village has shops, medical facilities and schools. There are three churches — Anglican, Methodist and United Reformed. There are around 20 organisations offering activities in which to participate. Local tourist attractions include Park Hall Countryside Experience, Chirk Castle, Whittington Castle and the Shropshire Union Canal.

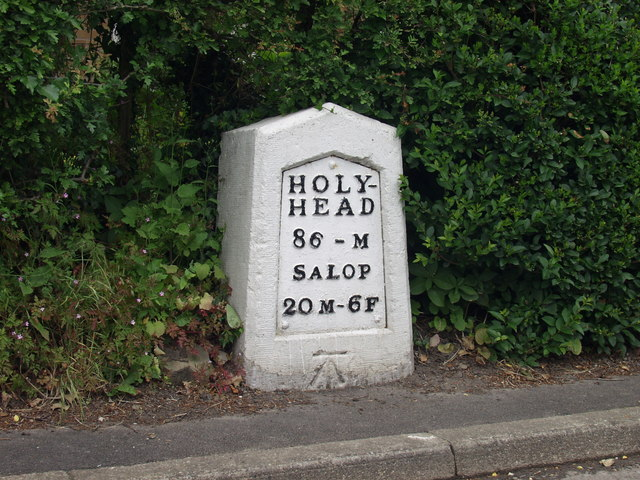
Milestone on the route of the old A5

=== Orthopaedic hospital ===
The Robert Jones and Agnes Hunt Orthopaedic Hospital is sited nearby. It was established as a convalescent home for disabled children in 1900 at Baschurch by Agnes Hunt. In 1919 funds and premises became available and the hospital transferred to the hospital section of a former army camp at Park Hall. The new site was officially opened on August 5, 1921, by Margaret Cambridge, Marchioness of Cambridge in the presence of its founders Sir Robert Jones and Dame Agnes Hunt. Much progress has been made since that time both with vast new buildings and pioneering medical treatments.

== Transport ==
Gobowen lies on the A5/A483 roads between London and Holyhead. The village has regular bus links with Oswestry, St Martins, Ellesmere and Wrexham.

Gobowen railway station is served by Transport for Wales with regular trains connecting to Wrexham, Chester, Shrewsbury, Holyhead and the North Wales Coast, Cardiff and Birmingham.

== Notable people ==
- Arthur Boucher (1870 at Gobowen -1948), Wales rugby union international

== See also ==
- Listed buildings in Selattyn and Gobowen
