= Agnes Hunt =

English nurse (1866–1948)

Dame Agnes Hunt DBE RRC
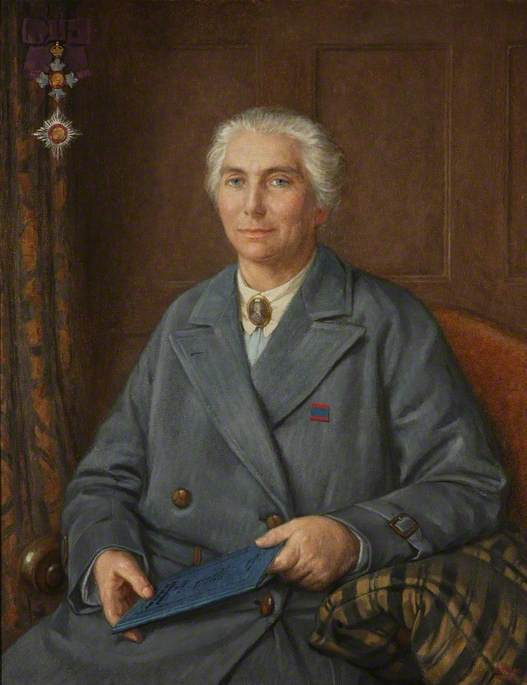
- c.1932 by Bernard Munns (1869–1942)
- Born: Agnes Gwendoline Hunt; 31 December 1866; London, England
- Died: 24 July 1948 (aged 81); Baschurch, Shropshire, England
- Education: Royal Alexandra Hospital, Rhyl, Wales
- Relatives: Rowland Hunt (brother)
- Medical career
- Profession: Nurse
- Institutions: The Robert Jones and Agnes Hunt Orthopaedic Hospital
- Sub-specialties: Orthopaedic nursing
- Awards: DBE; Royal Red Cross

Dame Agnes Gwendoline Hunt DBE RRC (31 December 1866 – 24 July 1948) was a British nurse, who is generally recognised as the first orthopaedic nurse.

== Early life ==
She was born in London, daughter and sixth of eleven children of Rowland Hunt (1828–1878) of Boreatton Park, Baschurch, a village in west Shropshire, England, and his wife, Florence Marianne, eldest daughter of Richard Buckley Humfrey of Stoke Albany, Northamptonshire, England. She was a cousin of the Naval officer Sir Nicholas Hunt, his son being the politician Jeremy Hunt. Her own brother, another Rowland Hunt (1858–1943) was also a politician.

Hunt was brought up at Boreatton Park until 1882, then at Kibworth Hall, Leicestershire before her widowed mother took the children to Australia, where they lived on a small farmstead. She was disabled from osteomyelitis of the hip that she developed as a child following septicaemia.

== Nursing career ==
In 1887, she returned to England and began training as a "lady pupil" nurse at the Royal Alexandra Hospital in Rhyl, Wales. She opened a convalescent home, the Baschurch Children's hospital, attached to the Salop Infirmary at Shrewsbury, for disabled children at Florence House (a family property) in Baschurch in 1900 which espoused the theory of open-air treatment.

In 1901, she sought treatment for her own condition from a Liverpool surgeon, Robert Jones. She invited him to visit the convalescent home and he eventually began travelling there on a regular basis to provide treatment to the children. By 1907, they had built an operating theatre and they introduced the diagnostic use of X-rays in 1913. In 1910 it was approved as a training school by the Chartered Society of Massage and during World War I, Florence House was used to treat wounded soldiers.

In 1918, Hunt was awarded the Royal Red Cross for her contribution during the war.

== Personal life ==
Agnes' companion over many decades was Emily Selina Goodford with whom she 'worked, quarrelled and loved...for thirty glorious years'. Agnes referred to Emily as 'Goody' and they lived together at Florence House, Baschurch. Goody died in 1920, after a short illness. In her autobiography Agnes wrote: 'Even now, after eighteen years, it is difficult to write of her and what she was to me....It is given to few people to live and work with one beloved friend for thirty years in perfect love and unity.'

Agnes and Emily share the same burial plot at All Saints Church, Baschurch.

== Robert Jones and Agnes Hunt Orthopaedic Hospital ==
In 1919, the British Red Cross Society and the Shropshire War Memorial Fund provided financing to move the facility, renamed the Shropshire Orthopaedic Hospital, to a former military hospital at Park Hall, near Gobowen, Oswestry. The hospital also provided training for nurses. Later, a school begun for the children developed into a training college for disabled adults, Derwen College. The hospital was used once again to treat wounded soldiers during World War II. Following an extensive fire in 1948, the hospital underwent a period of reconstruction and expansion, developing into what is now called The Robert Jones and Agnes Hunt Orthopaedic Hospital.

== Derwen College ==
In 1927, Dame Agnes Hunt established what would become Derwen College.

The training college was initially set up in ‘a couple of vacant huts in the grounds' of the Orthopaedic Hospital. Here physically disabled young people could learn a trade, suitable to their disability, and become either partially or wholly self-supporting.

A year later, in 1928, the college moved to the property next door to the hospital, The Derwen - a Georgian farmhouse.

Although, she passed the management of the college on to Rhaiadr Jones, Dame Agnes Hunt remained on the College's executive committee until her death in 1948.

== Honours ==
She was created a Dame Commander of the Order of the British Empire (DBE) in the 1926 Birthday Honours.

== Death ==
Hunt died in 1948 aged eighty-one. Her ashes were interred in the parish churchyard at Baschurch, where there is also a plaque inside the church, which reads: "Reared in suffering thou shalt know how to solace others' woe. The reward of pain doth lie in the gift of sympathy."

== Sources ==
- "Famous nurses: Dame Agnes Hunt". Nursing Mirror. 148 (13): 37. March 1979. ISSN 0029-6511. PMID 370802.
- Glupker, D F (1984). "The yesteryear of orthopaedic nursing (Agnes Hunt)". Orthopedic Nursing. 3 (6): 48. doi:10.1097/00006416-198411000-00007. ISSN 0744-6020. PMID 6393005.
- Ellis, Harold (November 2008). "Dame Agnes Hunt: pioneer of orthopaedic nursing". Journal of Perioperative Practice. 18 (11): 510. doi:10.1177/175045890801801107. ISSN 1750-4589. PMID 19051965. S2CID 3431892.
