= Arthur Probyn Jones =

British barrister, baronet and Liberal Party politician

Sir Arthur Probyn Jones, 2nd Baronet (28 July 1892 – 17 October 1951), was a British barrister, baronet and Liberal Party politician.

== Background ==
Jones was the only son of surgeon Sir Robert Jones, 1st Baronet, and Susie Evans of Liverpool. He was educated at Clifton College (Exhibitioner) and King's College, Cambridge where in 1913 he graduated, receiving a Bachelor of Arts LLB (Honours) and in 1918 a Master of Arts. His education had been interrupted by the 1914-18 war, during which he served with the King's Regiment (Liverpool), reaching the rank of captain. In 1919 he married Eileen Evans of Birkdale. They had one daughter. In 1933 he inherited his father's baronetcy and became known as Sir Arthur Probyn-Jones. On his death in 1951 the baronetcy became extinct.

== Professional career ==
In 1919, having qualified as a barrister Jones received a Call to the bar by the Inner Temple. He practised on the Northern Circuit. From 1939-45 he was employed in the legal department of the Ministry of Food at Tunbridge Wells. He was Chairman of the Medical Appeals Tribunal for the North Midland Region and Deputy Chairman of the National Health Service Tribunal. In addition to living in London he bought a property in Bexhill, Sussex where he served as a Justice of the peace.

== Political career ==
In November 1928 Jones was selected as prospective Liberal candidate for the West Derby division of Liverpool for the 1929 General Election. The seat had been won by the Liberals in 1923 when there was no Labour candidate. However, his prospects in a three-cornered contest were not good and he finished third, despite increasing the party vote-share;

General Election 1929: West Derby Electorate 53,745
Party	Candidate	Votes	%	±%
Unionist	Sir John Sandeman Allen	16,794	42.7	−9.8
Labour	William Harvey Moore	14,124	36.0	+6.4
Liberal	Arthur Probyn Jones	8,368	21.3	+3.4
Majority		2,670	6.7	−16.2
Turnout			73.1	−4.1
Unionist hold		Swing	-8.1	

He did not stand for parliament again.

== See also ==
- Probyn-Jones baronets

Baronetage of the United Kingdom
Preceded by Robert Jones	Baronet (of Rhyll); 1933–1951	Extinct
