= John Thomas (photographer) =

Welsh photographer

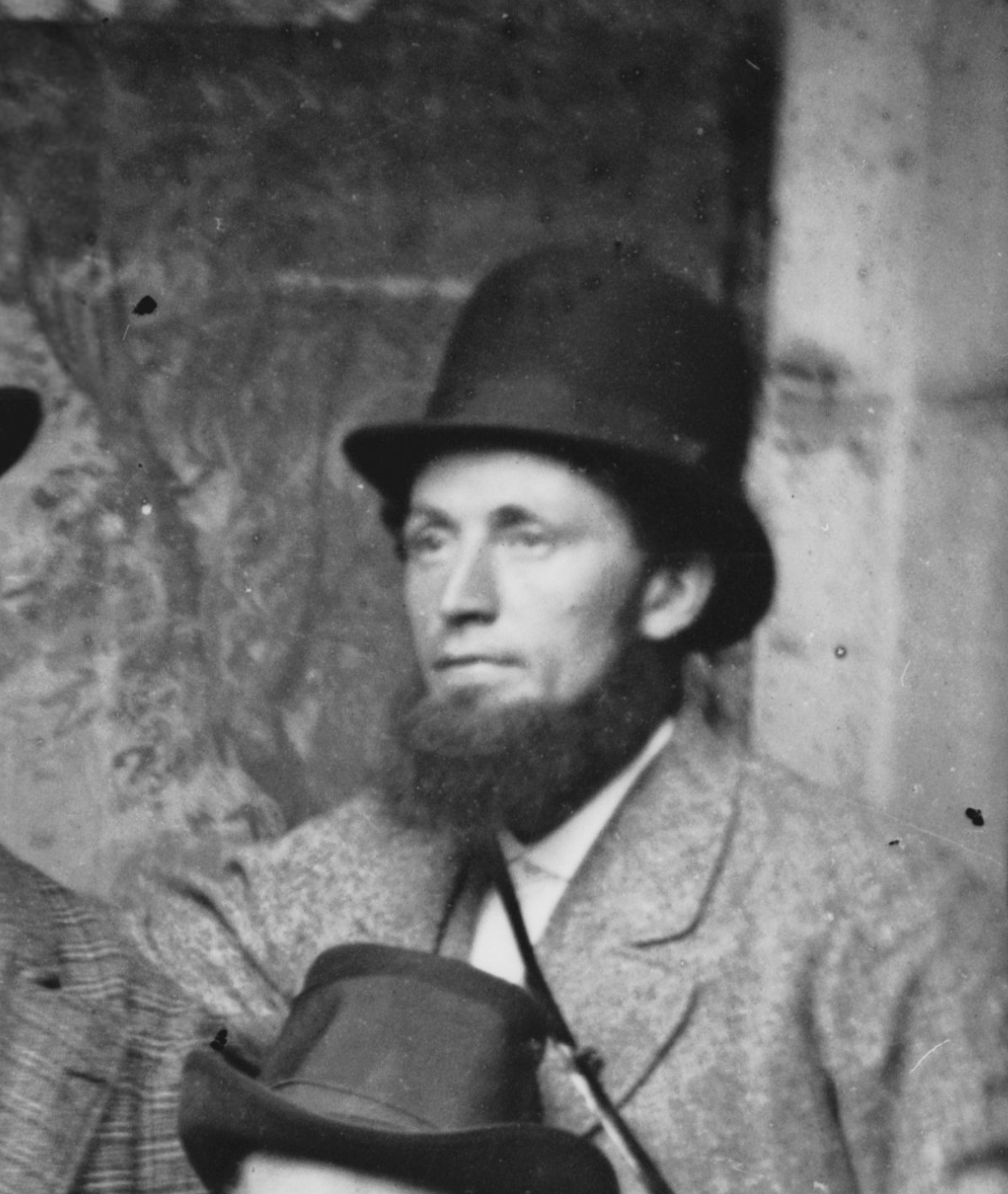
- Thomas, from a group portrait in his own collection
- Born: 14 April 1838; Llanfair Clydogau near Lampeter, Wales
- Died: 14 October 1905 (aged 67); Liverpool, England
- Occupation: Photographer

John Thomas (14 April 1838 – 14 October 1905) was a Welsh photographer, specialising in landscape images of Wales and Welsh chapels, and portraits of notable Welsh people, particularly church and chapel ministers.

== Biography ==
Thomas was born at Glanrhyd, in the parish of Llanfair Clydogau, near Lampeter, Cardiganshire in 1838, the son of David, a labourer, and his wife Jane. Thomas was educated in the village of Cellan, first as a pupil and then a pupil-teacher.

For a short time he worked as an assistant in a draper's shop in Lampeter. While still a teenager, in May 1853, he travelled to Liverpool, walking to Tregaron and then for 40 miles (64 km) to Llanidloes via Pontrhydfendigaid, Devil's Bridge and Plynlimon, before completing his journey by canal boat and train. He worked for ten years in Liverpool, in a draper's shop, starting in 1853, but was then obliged to change his way of life due to poor health. Before 1870 he got a job travelling, selling writing materials and selling photographs which enabled him to work in the country. Thomas realised that he was selling the very fashionable pictures called carte-de-visites that were of well known people, but few were from Wales. In 1863 he became manager of Harry Emmens' photographic studio in Liverpool, where he specialised in photographing non-conformist ministers.

In 1867 he established The Cambrian Gallery in Liverpool, a photographic business where he produced carte-de-visites and In memoriam cards. He ran a conventional studio photography business but he also took thousands of photographs of people and landscapes on long journeys through Wales at a time when a photo took time to both prepare and develop.

Thomas faced many technical challenges, particularly the difficulty of transporting his bulky photographic equipment in rural Wales, and in finding suitably dark spaces to undertake the development of the photographs. In his memoirs he reports: "I used many sorts of places for the purpose – a chicken coop, a stable many times, and once a cave when I took the group of Bards in Ruthin Eisteddfod..." The darkest place he claimed to have found was a uncompleted grave in Liverpool's Smithdown Lane Cemetery, where he was to take a photograph of the grave of Rev Pearse. Thomas placed his equipment in the bottom of the empty grave, and made it light-proof with the use of curtains.

Before his death, Thomas selected 3,113 glass plate negatives which were bought by the educationalist and historian Owen Morgan Edwards to illustrate his Welsh language magazine Cymru. The negatives are now in the collection of the National Library of Wales. Edwards commented "that no-one has such a complete collection of views of Welsh historic sites".

Thomas's second child was Professor William Thelwall Thomas MBE, Ch.M., FRCS (1865–1927), president of the surgery section of the British Medical Association.

Thomas died on 14 October 1905 at the house of his son Albert Ivor (1870–1911) and was buried at Anfield Cemetery in Liverpool.

== Photographs by Thomas ==
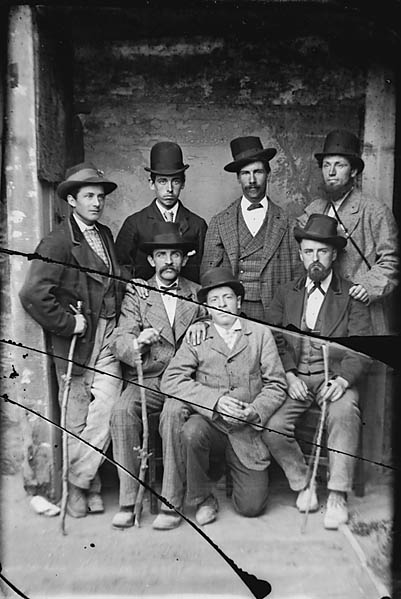
A group of walkers preparing to climb Snowdon. Thomas is part of this group, on the back row at the right with the beard.

Thomas sold a selection of negatives to Sir Owen Morgan Edwards and the descendants of Sir Owen later donated them to the National Library of Wales. The negatives are now part of the National Library's photographic collection. During the 1970s the collection was catalogued and access prints were prepared for reference by using new techniques to reproduce the tones of the negatives. Work to digitise the whole collection and make it available online was carried out in 2001.

The photographs by Thomas not only depict Wales during the nineteenth century but also provide a general illustration of the Victorian period. In an age when the portraiture was dominated by respectability, he chose to photograph ordinary people, with some of his less conventional portraits showing beggars, drunkards and vagrants. As well as taking portraits Thomas also photographed the events, such as country fairs, that were the fabric of country life, street scenes with notable buildings and new developments, including chapels that had been built recently. Aspects of social progress like banks, post offices and particularly the railways are common features in Thomas' photographs.

In 1863, he arranged for a group of Welsh ministers to visit Liverpool and have their portraits taken during Whitsun. These portraits were well received when they were advertised for sale in Welsh newspapers and periodical. This group of negatives are some of the earliest of datable examples of Thomas' photography in the National Library although there are also copies that he made of earlier works.

A memorial card, made from the portrait of Reverend John Phillips, was particularly popular and Thomas noted that over a thousand prints of this negative were sold in the six weeks following the death of the minister in 1867. In the same year, Thomas first travelled to take photographs in Wales. He attended the General Assembly of Welsh Calvinistic Methodists, where he portrayed the ministers gathered on a plot of land used for growing potatoes behind a chapel in Llanidloes. During this tour he also visited his home at Lampeter, where he took a photograph of his mother, Jane Thomas, sitting between two other women all in traditional Welsh dresses. In 1868 he made the journey to Wales again, this time attending the Eisteddfod festival at Ruthin Castle, and took a group portrait of the literary and musical stars. The success of these first visits to Wales encouraged Thomas to return regularly.

A catalogue that Thomas published lists the portraits he took of celebrities, most of whom were nonconformist religious ministers, although poets and literary figures are among the secular figures he depicted. In addition to portraits of the celebrities themselves, many of the houses that Thomas photographed are of interest as they are a former home of a notable author, poet or minister.
