= Robert Jones and Agnes Hunt Orthopaedic Hospital =

- The Robert Jones and Agnes Hunt Orthopaedic Hospital NHS Foundation Trust
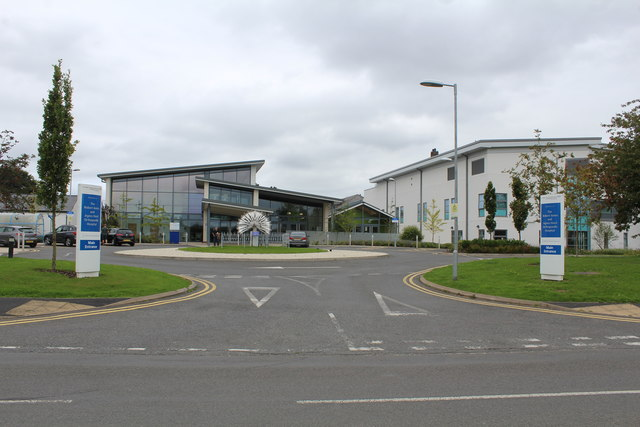
- The entrance to the Robert Jones and Agnes Hunt Orthopaedic Hospital

- Shown in Shropshire

Geography
- Location: Oswestry, Shropshire, England, United Kingdom
- Coordinates: 52.8842°N 3.0323°W

Organisation
- Care system: Public NHS
- Type: Specialist

Services
- Emergency department: No Accident & Emergency
- Speciality: Orthopaedics

History
- Founded: 1900

Links
- Website: http://www.rjah.nhs.uk/
- Lists: Hospitals in England
- Other links: Agnes Hunt

The Robert Jones and Agnes Hunt Orthopaedic Hospital (RJAH) in Gobowen, near Oswestry, Shropshire, England is a specialist orthopaedic hospital which provides elective orthopaedic surgery. It is managed by the Robert Jones and Agnes Hunt Orthopaedic Hospital NHS Foundation Trust.

== History ==
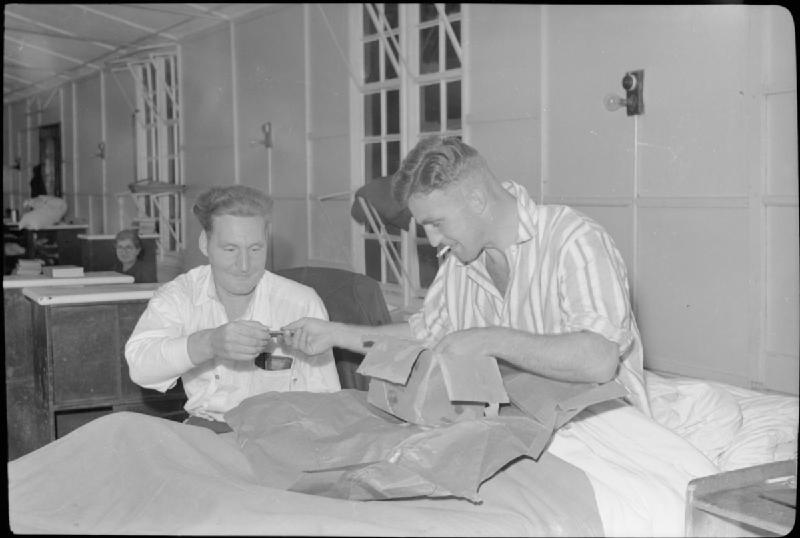
Rehabilitation of British Soldiers From Normandy

The hospital was originally established in Baschurch by Miss Agnes Hunt as the Baschurch Children's hospital in 1900. Agnes Hunt consulted Sir Robert Jones, after whom the hospital is also named, about her own condition in 1903 and he became honorary surgeon to the hospital in 1904. The hospital moved some 10 miles north-west to its present site near Oswestry as the Shropshire Orthopaedic Hospital in 1921 and became the Robert Jones and Agnes Hunt Orthopaedic Hospital in 1933. The hospital took in badly-injured patients under the Ministry of Health's Emergency Medical Service during the Second World War.

The hospital was served by Park Hall Halt, on the 2½-mile Gobowen to Oswestry branch of the Great Western Railway, which was originally opened by the Shrewsbury and Chester Railway. The halt opened in July 1926, and closed under the Beeching cuts in November 1966. The disused line today forms the western boundary of the site, and the remains of the halt can still be seen.

John Charnley, the leading orthopedic surgeon, worked in the hospital for six months in 1946. It joined the National Health Service in 1948 and achieved NHS Trust status in 1994. Following a major building programme, the Midlands Centre for Spinal Injuries re-opened in 2001. The hospital was awarded NHS Foundation Trust status in August 2011. Princess Alexandra formally opened the Theatre and Oncology building in 2017.

== Seven-day working ==
The hospital is a pioneer of seven-day working. Weekend work began with surgeons carrying out waiting list initiatives to deal with the problem of access times for the NHS. Researchers at the Dr Foster Intelligence Unit at Imperial College London looked at more than 4 million elective procedures across the UK in 2008–11. They found that the risk of death was 44 percent higher if the patient was operated on a Friday and 82 percent higher if operated on over the weekend. The Trust carries out about 10,000 procedures a year and in 2000-12 recorded 33 deaths after elective orthopaedic procedures. They found there was a lower mortality risk on Friday and on Saturday; at 0.008 percent for Friday and 0.014 percent on Saturday, with an average mortality rate for the trust at 0.023 percent.

== Performance ==
It was named by the Health Service Journal as one of the top hundred NHS trusts to work for in 2015. At that time it had 1101 full-time equivalent staff and a sickness absence rate of 3.23%. 93% of staff recommend it as a place for treatment and 71% recommended it as a place to work.

The hospital was investigated by Deloitte, a report commissioned by the trust itself, after an alert from a whistleblower found that from December 2013 to January 2015 an average of 424 patients had been excluded from the waiting list for surgery. The effect was that the trust "improved the performance above the 92 per cent national target. As such, it is clear to see that without the removal of these, the trust would not have met the national target for this indicator."

The Trust has estimated it could to lose up to £8m in income, 16% of its turnover, during 2016-17 under changes to the NHS tariff which are set to affect all specialist orthopaedic hospitals, though discussions are ongoing with Monitor and NHS England to find a solution.

== Veterans' Centre ==
The UK's first orthopaedic outpatient centre for British Armed Forces veterans was built at the hospital. £100,000 was pledged by the RJAH League of Friends when it launched an appeal in 2018. The Shropshire-based Headley Court Charity, following the sale of Headley Court in Surrey and transfer of facilities to Stanford Hall in Nottinghamshire, provided a £6M grant for building the complex and adding accommodation for veterans' charities and Shropshire Council services to provide a Veterans' Hub. A turf-cutting ceremony took place in June 2021 prior to the start of building. Sophie, Duchess of Edinburgh formally opened the centre on 4 April 2023.

== Notable patients ==
- Tim Brookshaw, National Hunt champion jockey and horse trainer, died there following a riding accident in 1981.

== See also ==
- List of NHS trusts
