= Probyn-Jones baronets =

Extinct baronetcy in the Baronetage of the United Kingdom

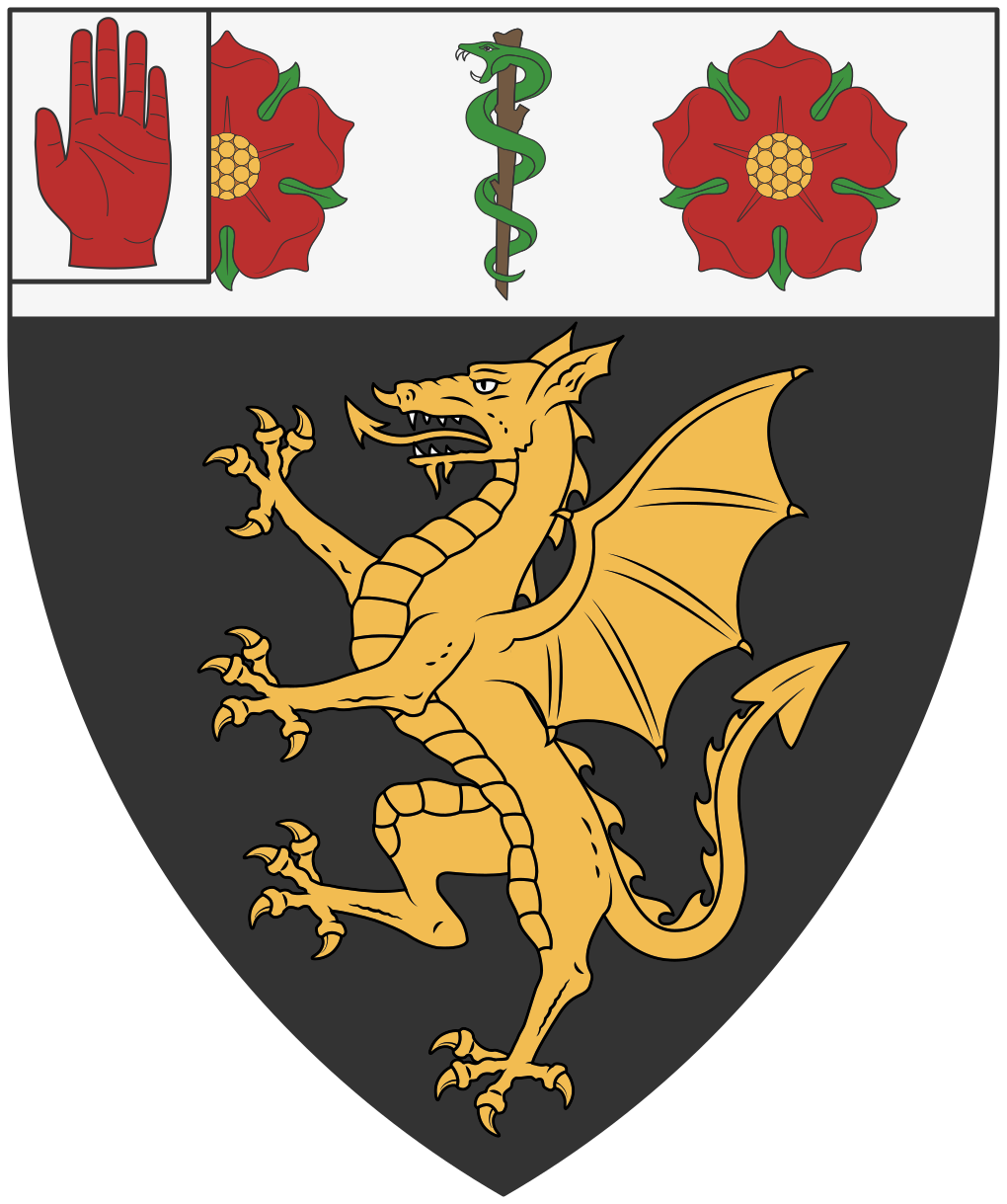
The coat of arms of Probyn-Jones of Pentower, Baronets.

The Jones, later Probyn-Jones Baronetcy, of Rhyll in the County of Flint, was a title in the Baronetage of the United Kingdom. It was created on 28 January 1926 for the orthopaedic surgeon Sir Robert Jones. The second Baronet assumed the additional surname of Probyn. The title became extinct on his death in 1951.

== Jones, later Probyn-Jones baronets, of Rhyll (1926) ==
- Sir Robert Jones, 1st Baronet (1858–1933)
- Sir Arthur Probyn Probyn-Jones, 2nd Baronet (1892–1951)
