= Tudor Thomas =

Welsh ophthalmic surgeon

Sir James William Tudor Thomas universally known as Tudor Thomas (23 May 1893 – 23 January 1976) was a Welsh ophthalmic surgeon who came to note in 1934 when pioneering work on corneal grafting restored the sight of a man who had been nearly blind for 27 years.

== Life history ==
Thomas was born in Ystradgynlais, Swansea, Wales in 1893. He was the only child of Thomas Thomas, the headmaster of Ystradgynlais County School, and Mary, who was the daughter of a colliery proprietor. He was educated at the Welsh School of Medicine in Cardiff, and the Middlesex Hospital in London. He specialised in eye surgery from an early point of his medical career.

He served in the Royal Army Medical Corps during World War I. After the war he worked for a time as a clinical assistant at the Royal London Ophthalmic Hospital (Moorfields) before returning to Wales to work as an ophthalmic surgeon. In 1921 he was appointed Ophthalmic Surgeon at Cardiff Royal Infirmary and United Cardiff Hospitals and served there for 37 years.

He was also a clinical teacher for the Welsh National School of Medicine. It was while at the School of Medicine that he undertook his pioneering work in corneal grafting. He conceived the idea of a donor system for corneal grafts and an eye bank was established in East Grinstead in 1955.

In 1956 he was knighted for his medical work.

In 1938 he had married Bronwen Vaughan Pugh; they had two sons.

== See also ==
List of Welsh medical pioneers

== Bibliography ==
- Davies, John; Jenkins, Nigel (2008). The Welsh Academy Encyclopaedia of Wales. Cardiff: University of Wales Press. ISBN 978-0-7083-1953-6.
