= Derwen College =

Further education college in Shropshire, England

Coordinates: 52.8884°N 3.0281°W

- Motto in English: A Place of Possibility
- Type: Specialist College
- Established: 1927
- Founder: Dame Agnes Hunt
- Principal: Meryl Green
- Location: Whittington Road, Gobowen, Oswestry, Shropshire, SY11 3JA, UK
- Campus: Residential and Day Provision
- Patron: HRH The Duchess of Kent
- Website: https://www.derwen.ac.uk/

Derwen College is a specialist college situated in Gobowen near Oswestry in Shropshire in the United Kingdom.

Derwen College offers residential and day placements to students aged 16–25 with special educational needs and disabilities (SEND), including:

- Learning and physical disabilities
- Autism
- Behaviours of concern
- Profound and Multiple Learning Disabilities

Students at Derwen College are supported to develop employability, social, and independence skills, preparing them for adulthood.

Derwen College's main campus in Gobowen, near Oswestry, and also three smaller campuses across Shropshire at: Ludlow, Telford and Walford (near Shrewsbury).

The College is rated as 'Good' by Ofsted. Derwen College is also rated as 'Good' by CQC.

== Derwen College's History ==
Derwen College was established in 1927 by Dame Agnes Hunt.

The training College was initially set up in 'a couple of vacant huts in the grounds' of the Orthopaedic Hospital. Here physically disabled young people could learn a trade, suitable to their disability, and become either partially or wholly self-supporting.

A year later, in 1928, the College moved to the property next door to the hospital, The Derwen – a Georgian farmhouse.

The College remains at the site in Gobowen, and opened three other campuses at: Walford, near Shrewsbury in 2014, Telford in 2020, and Ludlow in south Shropshire, in 2021.

Derwen College will be celebrating its centenary in 2027.

== Awards ==
Derwen College has received a number of awards including:

=== 2024 ===
Career Development Institute’s award – Best ‘Careers Programme in Post-16 Education’.

=== 2023 ===
Lawn Tennis Association Awards 2023 – Shropshire School of the Year

Skills Competitions Advocate Award in the World Skills UK Equity, Diversity and Inclusion Heroes Awards

Natspec Innovation Award 2023 for Partnerships Working – for partnership with Rocking Horse Media

NASEN Award 2023 – FE Provision of the Year

Oswestry in Bloom Chairs Award for Exceptional Work

=== 2022 ===
The Innovation Award – Charity Retail Awards

Queen’s Award for Enterprise – Promoting Opportunity

Natspec Award 2022 – Pathways into Employment

Aico Awards 2022 – College Initiative of the Year (for the Vintage Advantage launch)

=== 2021 ===
NASEN (National Association for Special Educational Needs) Award – Best aged 16–25 provision in the UK.

Awarded TES FE Awards Specialist provider of the year.

Pearson Teaching Awards 2021 – Gold award for Steve Evans in Specialist Teacher of the Year category.
