= Sigerist Society =

English medical association

The British Sigerist Society, named in honour of Henry E. Sigerist, was established by Marxist doctors in 1947 and met several times a year until 1955 to discuss the theoretical and social aspects of Medicine from a Marxist point of view. The members included Philip D'Arcy Hart, Martin Roff, Richard Doll and Julian Tudor Hart. Most of them were also members of the Socialist Medical Association which was affiliated to the Labour Party.

They discussed the relationship between science and social responsibility and the significance of social class. They advocated salaried and group practice for primary care.

Archives of the society are preserved in the Wellcome Library and the Communist Party of Great Britain archive in the Manchester's People's History Museum.

There is a separate Sigerist Circle of medical historians based in Baltimore.
