= Llewellyn Jones Llewellyn =

Welsh physician and writer

- Born: 1871; Aberystwyth
- Died: 19 April 1934 (aged 62–63)
- Occupation(s): Physician, writer

Richard Llewellyn Jones Llewellyn (1871 – 19 April 1934) was a Welsh physician and writer.

Llewellyn was born in Aberystwyth. His father was Surgeon Major Morris Jones. He obtained his M.B. degree in 1895 and during 1900–1902 was resident medical officer to Bath Royal Mineral Water Hospital. In 1911, he married Hon. Mrs. Crosse of Hulbertson.

Llewellyn was considered an authority on rheumatism. He authored several books on rheumatism and gout with the assistance of his brother Arthur Bassett Jones. In 1912, he was appointed honorary physician to Bath Royal Mineral Water Hospital. He was elected a governor in 1913 and from 1915 to 1922 he served on the committee. He was appointed consulting physician in 1922, a position he held until he died.

Llewellyn authored an influential work entitled Gout, in 1920. He concluded that gout was a disease of civilisation and that it was unknown among "native peoples". He described gout as the "nemesis that overtakes those addicted to luxurious habits and dietetic excesses". He was president of the Balneological and Climatological Section of the Royal Society of Medicine and vice-president of the British Committee on Rheumatism for the International Society of Medical Hydrology. He was a Fellow of the Royal Meteorological Society.

== Selected publications ==
- Arthritis Deformans (1909)
- Fibrositis (Gouty, Infective, Traumatic) (1915)
- Pensions and the Principles of Their Evaluation (1919)
- Gout (1920)
- Aspects of Rheumatism and Gout: Their Pathogeny, Prevention and Control (1927)

== See also ==
- List of Welsh medical pioneers
