= John David Spillane =

Welsh neurologist (1909–1985)

- Born: 7 May 1909; Cardiff
- Died: 23 July 1985 (aged 76); Newport, Dyfed
- Known for: An Atlas of Clinical Neurology (1968)

John David "Jerry" Spillane FRCP (1909–1985) was a Welsh neurologist and a pioneer of tropical neurology.

== Biography ==
After education at Howardian High School and then graduation BSc from University College Cardiff, Spillane studied medicine at Cardiff's Welsh National School of Medicine, graduating there MB BCh (Wales) in 1933. He qualified MRCP in 1936. In 1937 he went to the USA as a Commonwealth Fund fellow, studying under Paul Dudley White at Harvard Medical School and Massachusetts General Hospital. In 1938 Spillane was awarded a Harvard research fellowship and studied at the Neurological Institute of New York affiliated with Columbia University College of Physicians and Surgeons. In 1939 he returned to the UK and graduated MD (Wales) with a thesis based on his research in cardiology.

In 1939 in East Glamorgan, Glamorganshire, he married Joan Rees, daughter of a Cardiganshire physician. Spillane then enlisted in the RAMC and was posted to the military hospital at Aldershot. He was subsequently posted to the Middle East as an adviser in neurology to the Ninth Army. He completed his war service as lieutenant colonel and adviser in neurology to Middle East Forces. After the end of WWII he spent a year at the National Hospital for Neurology and Neurosurgery, Queen Square, London. He was appointed in 1946 an assistant physician to the Cardiff Royal Infirmary and then a consultant neurologist there, as well as an honorary lecturer at the Welsh National School of Medicine. His clinical research, teaching, and writing helped to establish an international reputation for the Cardiff Royal Infirmary's department of neurology. He gave weekly clinical demonstrations known as the "JD Show".

Jerry's own contributions were legion, most notably on cervical spondylosis and the importance of the sagittal diameter of the spinal cord, craniovertebral anomalies, the neurology of dwarfism, traumatic encephalopathy of boxers and the septum pellucidum, trigeminal neuropathy, acrodystrophic neuropathy, iatrogenic neurology (including vaccination), restless legs, diabetes insipidus in pulmonary disorders, and tropical neurology, including subacute myelo-optico-neuropathy in Japan and the ataxia paraplegia of Jamaica.

Spillane was elected FRCP in 1950. In the 1960s he was one of the first to use carbamazepine for the treatment of trigeminal neuralgia. In 1968 he published An Atlas of Clinical Neurology, with in 1975 a second edition and in 1982 a third edition, which was revised by his son, John, who was also a consultant neurologist. The Atlas was translated into four languages. In 1972 J. D. Spillane delivered the Bradshaw Lecture on The geography of neurology. In 1974 he retired and was elected president of the Association of British Neurologists. Under the auspices of the Royal Society of Medicine he gave in 1976 the Hughlings Jackson lecture on Hughlings Jackson's American contemporaries: the birth of American neurology. For the academic year 1976–1977 he was Sandoz visiting professor at the Dartmouth Medical School in New Hampshire.

Upon his death he was survived by his widow, his son, and two daughters.

== See also ==
List of Welsh medical pioneers

== Selected publications ==
=== Articles ===
- with Paul D. White: Spillane, J. D.; White, P. D. (October 1939). "Herpes zoster and angina pectoris". Br Heart J. 1 (4): 291–302. doi:10.1136/hrt.1.4.291. PMC 503412. PMID 18609826.
- Spillane, J. D. (October 1939). "Volumetric reconstruction of the heart in health and in disease: a radiological study". Br Heart J. 1 (4): 333–344. doi:10.1136/hrt.1.4.333. PMC 503415. PMID 18609829.
- with Paul White: Spillane, J. D.; White, P. (April 1940). "Atypical pain in angina pectoris and myocardial infarction". Br Heart J. 2 (2): 123–131. doi:10.1136/hrt.2.2.123. PMC 480933. PMID 18609839.
- Spillane, J. D. (30 November 1940). "Observations on effort syndrome". Br Med J. 2 (4169): 739–741. doi:10.1136/bmj.2.4169.739. PMC 2179947. PMID 20783418.
- Spillane, J. D. (15 February 1941). "Bell's Palsy and herpes zoster". Br Med J. 1 (4180): 236–237. doi:10.1136/bmj.1.4180.236. PMC 2161250. PMID 20783528.
- Spillane, J. D. (July 1951). "The heart in myotonia atrophic". Br Heart J. 13 (3): 343–347. doi:10.1136/hrt.13.3.343. PMC 479426. PMID 14848388.
- with J. W. Keyser, and R. A. Parker: Spillane, J. D.; Keyser, J. W.; Parker, R. A. (February 1952). "Amino-aciduria and Copper Metabolism in Hepatolenticular Degeneration". J Clin Pathol. 5 (1): 16–24. doi:10.1136/jcp.5.1.16. PMC 1023496. PMID 14917766.
- Spillane, J. D. (June 1952). "Four Cases of Diabetes Insipidus and Pulmonary Disease". Thorax. 7 (2): 134–147. doi:10.1136/thx.7.2.134. PMC 1019151. PMID 14931377.
- Spillane, J. D. (3 September 1955). "Sudden giddiness". Br Med J. 2 (4939): 612, 613–614. doi:10.1136/bmj.2.4939.612. PMC 1980725. PMID 13240198.
- Spillane, J. D. (3 December 1955). "The effect of nicotine on spinocerebellar ataxia". Br Med J. 2 (4952): 1345–1351. doi:10.1136/bmj.2.4952.1345. PMC 1981601. PMID 13269865.
- Spillane, J. D. (10 September 1960). "New American Medical Schools". Br Med J. 2 (5201): 778–785. doi:10.1136/bmj.2.5201.778. PMC 2098069. PMID 13833347.
- Spillane, J. D. (10 November 1962). "Five boxers". Br Med J. 2 (5314): 1205–1210, 1212–1–1212–2. doi:10.1136/bmj.2.5314.1205. PMC 1926206. PMID 13990135.
- SPILLANE JD (February 1964). "Iatrogenic neurological diseases: Drug-induced neurological disorders". Proceedings of the Royal Society of Medicine. 57 (2): 135–140. doi:10.1177/003591576405700226. PMC 1897799. PMID 14116033.
- Spillane, J. D. (26 December 1970). "Restless legs syndrome in chronic pulmonary disease". Br Med J. 4 (5738): 796–798. doi:10.1136/bmj.4.5738.796. PMC 1820413. PMID 5497412.
- Spillane, J. D. (21 December 1974). "A memorable decade in the history of neurology 1874-84. I." Br Med J. 4 (5946): 701–706. doi:10.1136/bmj.4.5946.701. PMC 1612863. PMID 4155339.
- Spillane, J. D. (28 December 1974). "A memorable decade in the history of neurology 1874-84. II". Br Med J. 4 (5947): 757–759. doi:10.1136/bmj.4.5947.757. PMC 1612750. PMID 4613426.
- with H. Urich: Spillane, J. D.; Urich, H. (February 1976). "Trigeminal neuropathy with nasal ulceration: report of two cases and one necropsy". J Neurol Neurosurg Psychiatry. 39 (2): 105–113. doi:10.1136/jnnp.39.2.105. PMC 492234. PMID 177737.
- Spillane, J. D. (26 June 1976). "Medical history. Doctors of 1776-I". Br Med J. 1 (6025): 1571–1574. doi:10.1136/bmj.1.6025.1571. PMC 1640481. PMID 776344.
- Spillane, J. D. (3 July 1976). "Doctors of 1776-II". Br Med J. 2 (6026): 28–30. doi:10.1136/bmj.2.6026.28. PMC 1687697. PMID 779922.
- Spillane, J. D. (23 June 1979). "Strange Encounters". Br Med J. 1 (6179): 1712. doi:10.1136/bmj.1.6179.1712-a. PMC 1599206.
- Spillane, J. D. (10 November 1979). "Autumn words". Br Med J. 2 (6199): 1208–1209. doi:10.1136/bmj.2.6199.1208. PMC 1597291. PMID 20792973.

=== Books ===
- Doctrine of the nerves: chapters in the history of neurology. Oxford; New York: Oxford University Press. 1981.
- Medical travellers : narratives from the seventeenth, eighteenth, and nineteenth centuries. Oxford; New York: Oxford University Press. 1984.
- as editor: Tropical neurology. London; New York: Oxford University Press. 1973. (This was the first textbook specifically dealing with the subspecialty of tropical neurology within tropical medicine.)
