= Sir Robert Jones, 1st Baronet =

Welsh orthopaedic surgeon

Sir Robert Jones
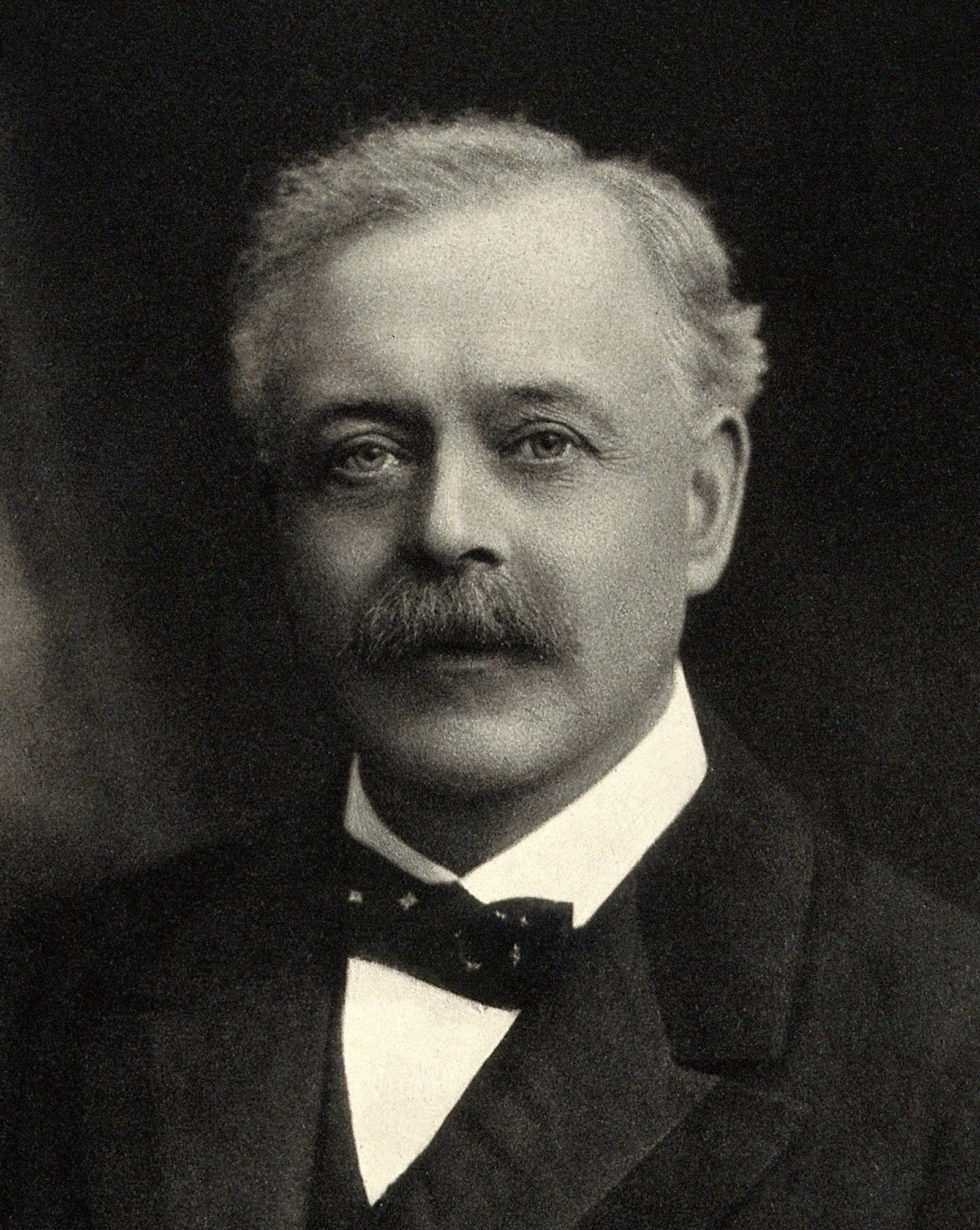
- Born: 28 June 1857; Rhyl, Denbighshire, Wales
- Died: 14 January 1933 (aged 75); Llanfechain, Montgomeryshire, Wales
- Known for: Jones fracture
- Awards: Cameron Prize for Therapeutics of the University of Edinburgh (1920)
- Scientific career
- Fields: Orthopaedic surgery

Sir Robert Jones, 1st Baronet, KBE, CB, TD, FRCS (28 June 1857 – 14 January 1933) was a Welsh orthopaedic surgeon who helped to establish the modern specialty of orthopaedic surgery in Britain.

He was an early proponent of the use of radiography in orthopaedics, and in 1902 described the eponymous Jones fracture.

== Life and work ==
Robert Jones was born in Llandudno, North Wales, and was brought up in London. His father gave up his career as an architect to take up writing, so his family became quite poor. At the age of 16 he left London to live with his uncle, Hugh Owen Thomas, in Liverpool. He learned about fracture care and the manufacture of braces from his uncle, and attended the Liverpool School of Medicine from 1873 to 1878. He continued to work with his uncle, and was subsequently appointed Honorary Assistant Surgeon to the Stanley Hospital in Liverpool in 1887. At this time, Jones and his uncle were among the few surgeons interested in the treatment of fractures, while the majority of orthopaedic surgery was aimed at correcting deformity in children and was carried out by general surgeons. He received his FRCS in 1889.

=== Manchester Ship Canal ===
In 1888 he was appointed Surgeon-Superintendent for the construction of the Manchester Ship Canal, responsible for the injured among the 20,000 workers during the seven-year project. He organised the first comprehensive accident service in the world, dividing the 36-mile site into 3 sections, and establishing a hospital and a string of first aid posts in each section. He staffed the hospitals with medical personnel trained in fracture management. The hospitals were linked by a railway which ran the length of the canal, and Sir Robert could be contacted in Liverpool by telegraphy if his presence was required. He personally managed 3,000 cases and performed 300 operations in his own hospital. This position enabled him to learn new techniques and improve the standard of fracture management.

=== Organisation of orthopaedic surgeons ===
On 3 November 1894, Robert Jones and Alfred Tubby convened a group of surgeons at the Holborn Restaurant in London to found the British Orthopaedic Society. The society had 31 members, most of whom were still general surgeons with an interest in orthopaedics; this lack of committed orthopaedic surgeons is likely to have been the reason that the society disbanded after 4 years.

In 1913 Jones served as the President of the orthopaedic section of the International Medical Congress held in London. The subsequent congress was to be held in Munich three years later.

=== Radiography ===
Wilhelm Röntgen announced the discovery of X-rays on 28 December 1895. This discovery was published in the Frankfurter Zeitung newspaper which was translated for Robert Jones by Mrs. Wimpfheimer, a volunteer in his Sunday clinic in Liverpool.

On 7 February 1896, Jones and Oliver Lodge took a radiograph of the wrist of a 12-year-old boy to locate a bullet that could not be found by probing. The X-ray required a 2-hour exposure, but successfully demonstrated the bullet lodged in the third carpometacarpal joint. This case was published in The Lancet in February 1896, the first published clinical radiograph.

Jones continued to value the use of X-rays in his practice. In a paper published a few months before he died, he remarked:

Radiography here, as in all branches of medicine, is an essential aid to diagnosis. No matter how experienced we may be, we cannot afford to dispense with it, even in the apparently simple and obvious case. Not only should we insist upon procuring a film, but it is equally important that we should welcome the radiologist's reading of it. Some surgeons resent this and say, "Give me the film so that I can read it for myself," but this is an arrogant and stupid attitude, and not to the patient's advantage.

=== The Jones fracture ===
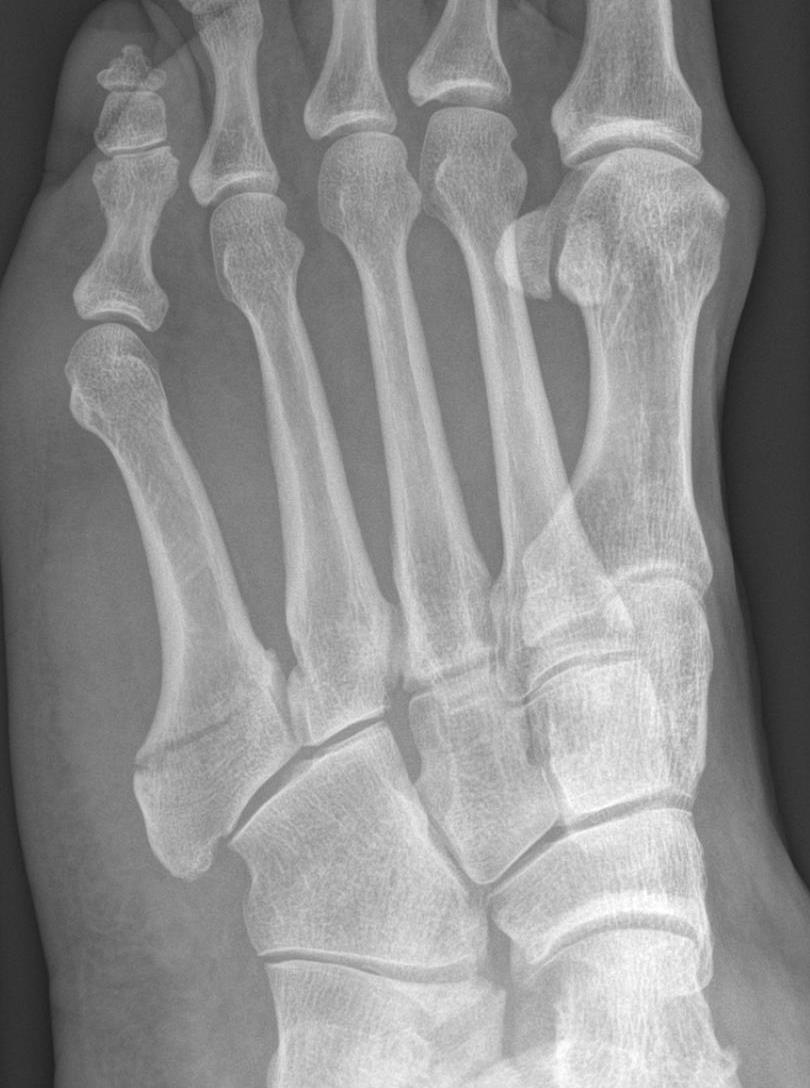
Jones fracture of the 5th metatarsal of the foot, between the epiphysis (base) and the diaphysis (shaft).

Robert Jones described the fracture of the fifth metatarsal which bears his name in the Annals of Surgery in 1902. In his paper, Jones described the fracture in a series of six patients, the first of which was himself. He had injured his foot while dancing several months earlier, and had thought the injury to be to a tendon in the foot. He examined himself the day after the injury, and found that the tendon was intact, but he could not find definite evidence of bony injury. He asked a colleague, David Morgan, to X-ray his foot, and a fracture above the base of the fifth metatarsal was found. The finding of similar fractures in several patients after his own prompted him to write about it. He also noted that the fracture was not caused by direct trauma to the bone, as had always been assumed before, but by a cross-strain being applied to the bone.

=== First World War ===
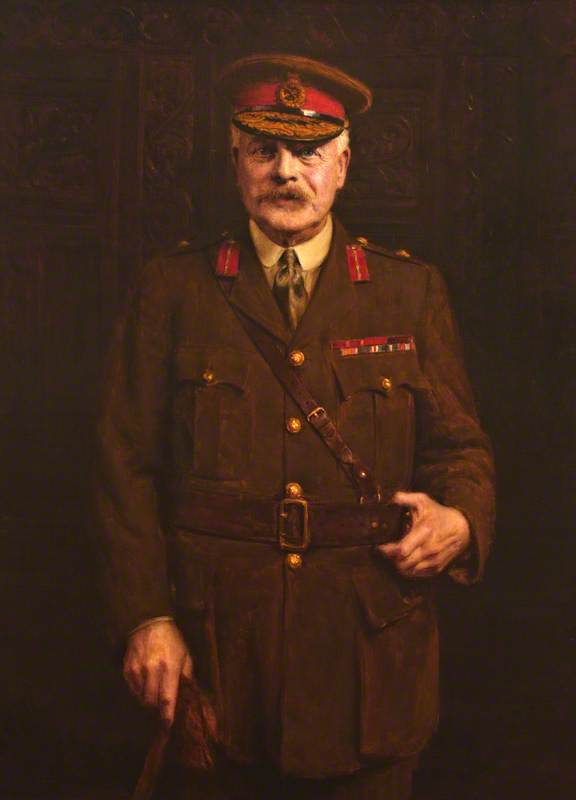
Jones in uniform

At the outbreak of the First World War Jones was mobilised as a Territorial Army surgeon in the Royal Army Medical Corps. He observed that treatment of fractures both at the front and in hospitals at home was inadequate, and his efforts led to the introduction of military orthopaedic hospitals. He was appointed Inspector of Military Orthopaedics, with responsibility over 30,000 beds. The hospital in Ducane Road, Hammersmith became the model for both British and American military orthopaedic hospitals. His advocacy of the use of Thomas splint for the initial treatment of femoral fractures resulted in a dramatic reduction in morbidity and mortality from this injury. Jones was promoted several times for his war service, ending his military career as a major general.

Jones died, aged 75, in Bodynfoel, near Llanfechain.

== Personal life ==
Jones married in 1887 Susie, daughter of William Evans of Liverpool, with whom he had one son and one daughter. She died in 1918.

== Honours ==
Jones was the recipient of many honours from surgical institutions and societies at home and abroad and received honorary degrees from six universities, of which the D.Sc. from the University of Wales (1917) was one. The universal tribute to him as an orthopaedic surgeon was revealed by his election as first president of the International Society of Orthopaedic Surgery. He was made KBE in 1919, a Knight Bachelor and CB in 1917, and a baronet. In 1920, Jones was awarded the Cameron Prize for Therapeutics of the University of Edinburgh. He also held the TD, was a Knight of Grace of the Order of St John of Jerusalem, and was awarded the U.S. Army Distinguished Service Medal in 1919.

After his death, his ashes were laid to rest in Liverpool Cathedral. His son, Arthur Probyn Jones, succeeded to his baronetcy.

Harry Platt was among the orthopaedic surgeons to have been very influenced by the work of Jones.

The Robert Jones and Agnes Hunt Orthopaedic Hospital is named after him. The hospital was originally established in Baschurch, Shropshire by Miss Agnes Hunt as the Baschurch Children's Hospital in 1900. Agnes Hunt had consulted Jones about an illness of her own in 1903 and he became honorary surgeon to the hospital in 1904. The hospital moved its present site in Oswestry as the Shropshire Orthopaedic Hospital in 1921 and became the Robert Jones and Agnes Hunt Orthopaedic Hospital in 1933.

A statue of Sir Robert was unveiled at the opening of the Defence and National Rehabilitation Centre by the Duke of Cambridge in June 2018.

== See also ==
- List of Welsh medical pioneers

Baronetage of the United Kingdom
New creation	Baronet (of Rhyll); 1926–1933	Succeeded by Arthur Probyn Jones
