= Philip D'Arcy Hart =

British epidemiologist (1900–2006)

- Born: 25 June 1900
- Died: 30 July 2006 (aged 106)
- Scientific career
- Fields: Medicine
- Institutions: University College Hospital

Philip Montagu D'Arcy Hart, CBE (25 June 1900 – 30 July 2006) was a seminal British medical researcher and pioneer in tuberculosis treatment.

== Personal life ==
Philip D'Arcy Hart was the grandson of Samuel Montagu, 1st Baron Swaythling. He was educated at Clifton College.

In 1941, he married Ruth Meyer (1913–2007), later a medical gynaecologist. They had a son, the economist Oliver Hart.

Philip D'Arcy Hart died at the age of 106 in 2006.

== Career ==
D'Arcy Hart became a consultant physician at University College Hospital at the age of 34. Three years later, he joined the Medical Research Council (MRC). He was a pioneer of evidence-based medicine, conducting some of the earliest randomized controlled trials on patulin in 1943 and streptomycin with Austin Bradford Hill.

D'Arcy Hart became involved with much of the MRC's early research into dust diseases in coal miners. He was a member of the MRC Streptomycin in Tuberculosis Trials Committee, which is generally accepted as the first randomized clinical trial. At the age of 71, D'Arcy Hart published a seminal paper in the Journal of Experimental Medicine, showing that the intracellular pathogen Mycobacterium tuberculosis avoids destruction in the cell's lysosomes by circumventing these organelles altogether—a trick now known to be used by many other intracellular pathogens.

He was a member of the Committee for the Study of Social Medicine set up in 1939, and later the Sigerist Society, which discussed the theoretical and social aspects of medicine from a Marxist point of view.
