= Hugh Owen Thomas =

Welsh orthopaedic surgeon

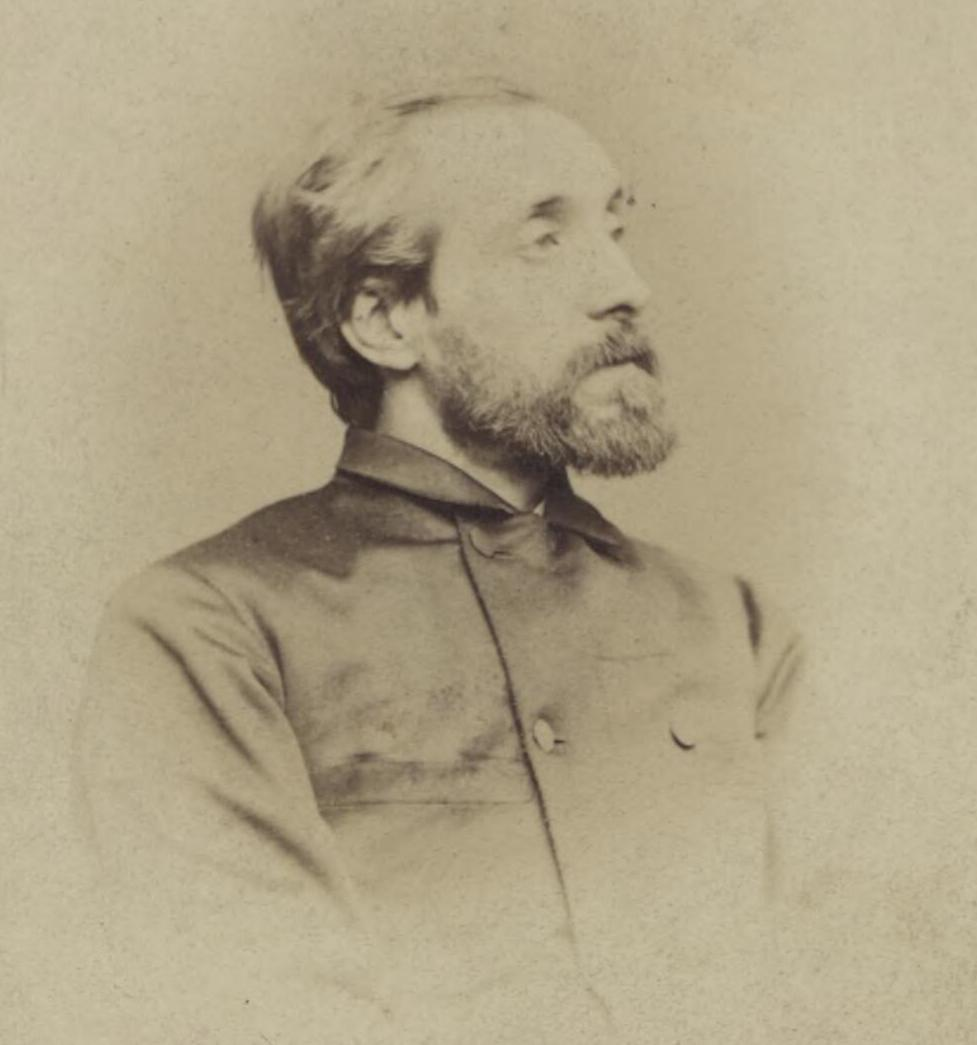
Hugh Owen Thomas

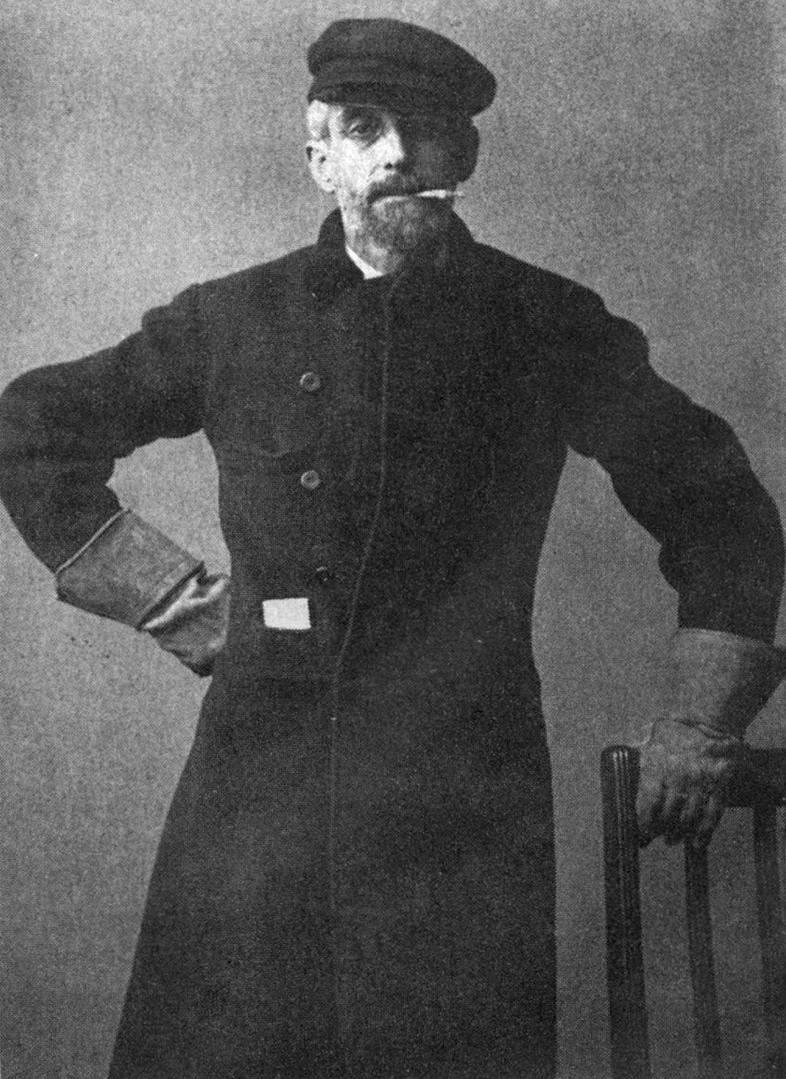
Hugh Owen Thomas

Hugh Owen Thomas (23 August 1834 – 6 January 1891) was a Welsh orthopaedic surgeon. He and his nephew Robert Jones have been called "the Fathers of orthopaedic surgery".

Thomas was descended from a line of Welsh bone setters and placed great importance on rest in treatment of fractures. He is responsible for a number of contributions to orthopaedic treatment and surgery, producing a number of books and methods that revolutionised orthopaedic practice. He is particularly known for the Thomas splint, which was widely used during World War I, reducing mortality from 80% to just 8% by the end of the war. His principles of practice were also spread to the USA by John Ridlon, amongst others.

== Family background ==
Hugh Owen Thomas was the great-grandson of a young boy who had been shipwrecked on Anglesey (Ynys Môn) between 1743 and 1745 with his brother. One of the young brothers died a few days later but the survivor was given the name Evan Thomas by the family that adopted and raised him, he established a family tradition of bone-setting. Later DNA investigations found Evan Thomas to have come from the Caucasus mountains, on the Georgia-Russia border.

== Early life and education ==
Hugh Owen Thomas was born on Anglesey (Ynys Môn) on the 23rd of August, 1834 whilst his mother was visiting relative on the island. Hugh was described as frail child and his parents sent him to live with his grandparents on Anglesey (Ynys Môn) until he was 13, hoping this environment would benefit his health more than industrial Liverpool. Whilst at school, another school-boy threw a stone at Thomas, hitting him causing an ectropion eye. Thomas started wearing an eye patch to keep the cold air out and later kept his peak hat down over it to stop others from staring.

The eldest son of Evan Thomas (the grandson of the prior Evan Thomas of the same name), Hugh Owen Thomas was educated at the college at New Brighton, until the age of 17. He was an apprentice to Dr. Owen Roberts before studying at Edinburgh University in 1855. Following two sessions in Edinburgh, he moved to University College London for his third session. In 1857 he qualified with an MRCS England and travelled to Paris to study surgery.

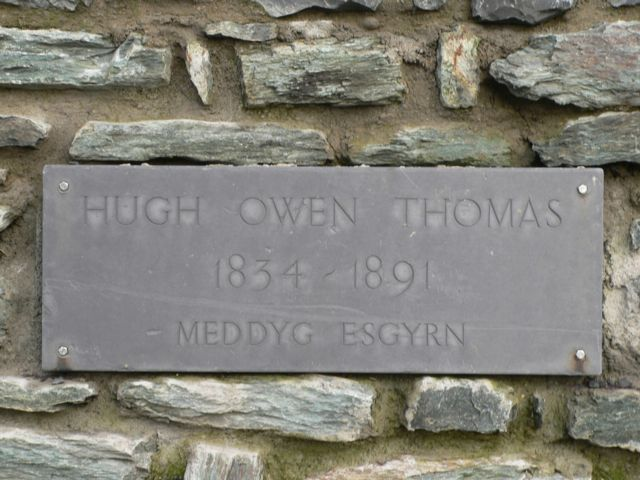
A plaque dedicated to Hugh Owen Thomas at Llys Meddyg, Bodedern, Anglesey (Ynys Môn)."Hugh Owen Thomas, 1834 - 1891, Meddyg Esgyrn" (Bone Doctor).

== Professional career ==
Following his stint in France, Hugh Owen Thomas joined his father Evan Thomas' practice for a year. His working relationship deteriorated with his father, as the academically uneducated father and medically educated son continued to disagree. Thomas started his own practice at 24 Hardy Street, Liverpool and in 1866 he acquired 11 Nelson Street, Liverpool, enlarging the surgery house to contain two waiting rooms, four consulting rooms, a surgery, and a workshop.He employed a full-time smith and leather worker to make splints and other medical devices that he himself designed and treated many patients from the Merseyside area. He is known for his principles of rest and bone alignment before the discovery and use of x-ray and was also known for encouraging immobility and rest of the injured or diseased bone or joint. In 1875, Thomas published his first book, titled "Diseases of the Hip, Knee, and Ankle Joints" where he first described his designs of the hip and knee splints.

== Medical legacy ==
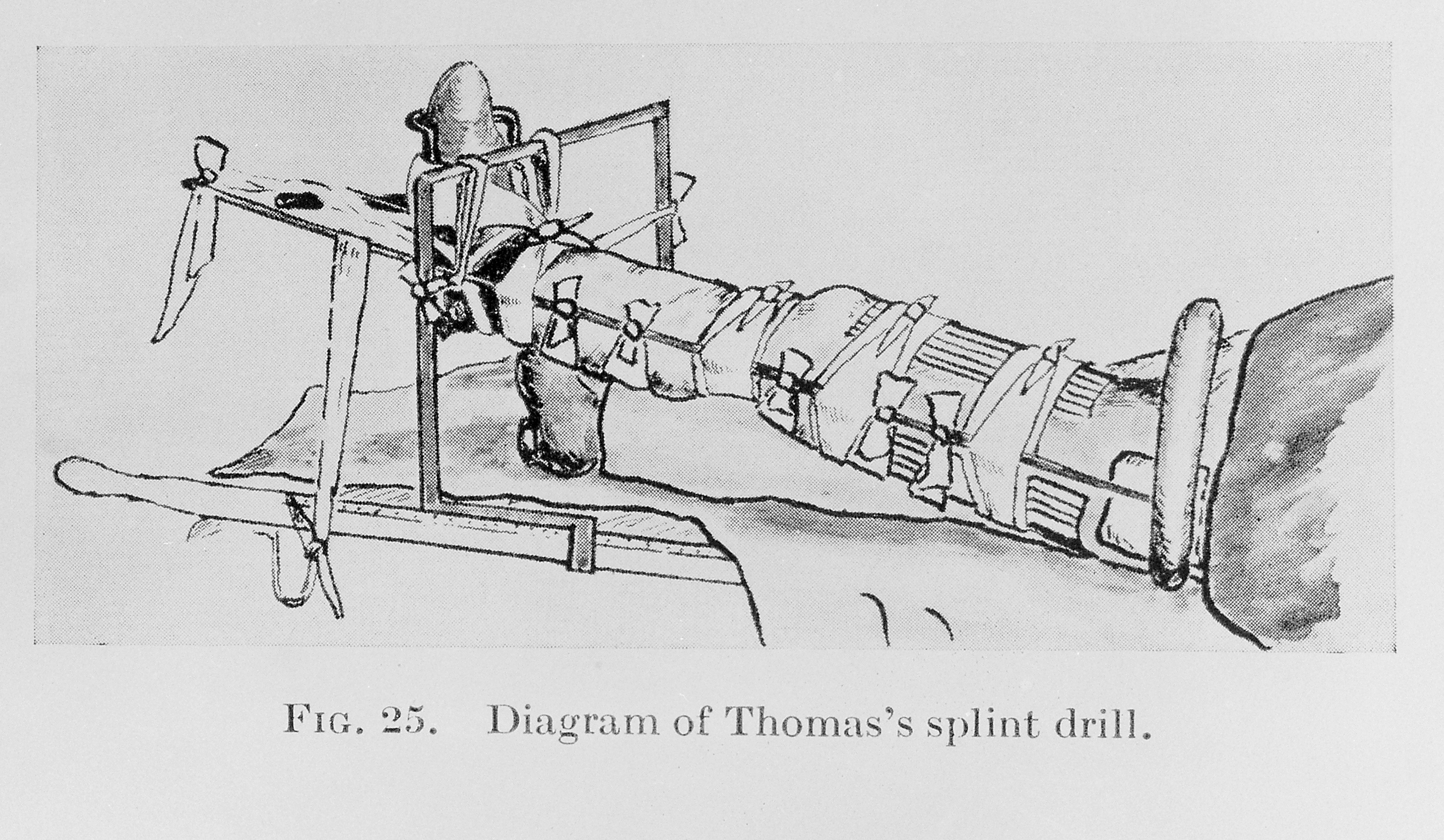
Application of the Thomas splint.

His contribution to orthopaedics was manifold. In the treatment of fractures and tuberculosis he advocated rest, which should be 'enforced, uninterrupted and prolonged'. He designed the Thomas Splint to treat fracture of the femur and hip joint, the Thomas test to assess for hip contracture and extensibility, the Thomas collar to treat tuberculosis of the cervical vertebrae, and the Thomas manoeuvre to assess for hip joint fracture, the Thomas wrench to reduce fractures (bring bones back into place) and the Thomas heel to prevent depression of the talus bone (in the ankle).

=== Thomas Splint ===
In order to achieve a combination of prolonged rest, Thomas created the 'Thomas Splint', which would stabilise a fractured femur and prevent infection. The Thomas splint was introduced in 1916 to treat injured soldiers and reduced the rate of mortality from fractures (particularly femoral fractures) from 80% to 8%, in 1918.

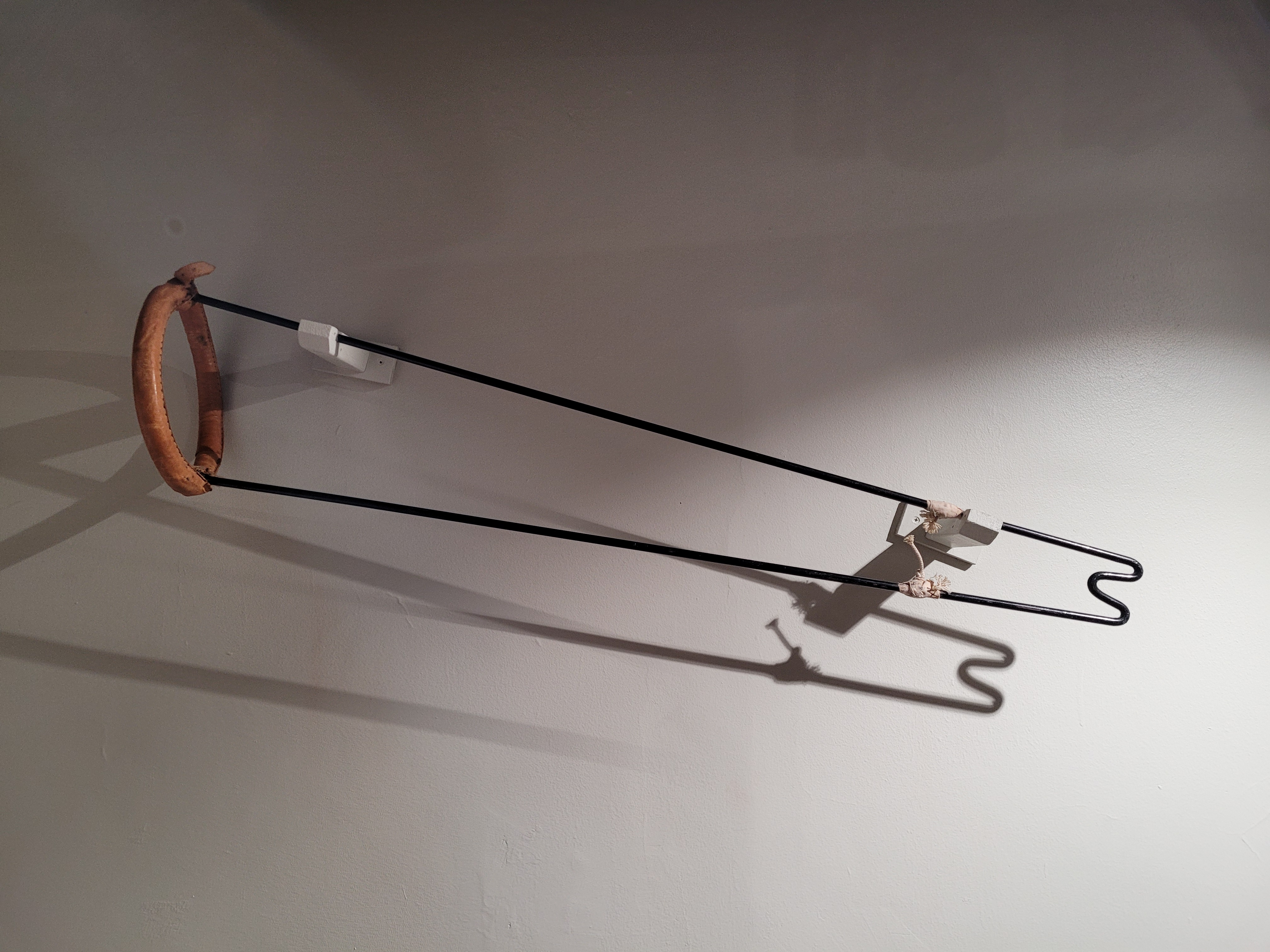
Thomas splint on display at Thackray Museum of Medicine

=== Thomas Test ===
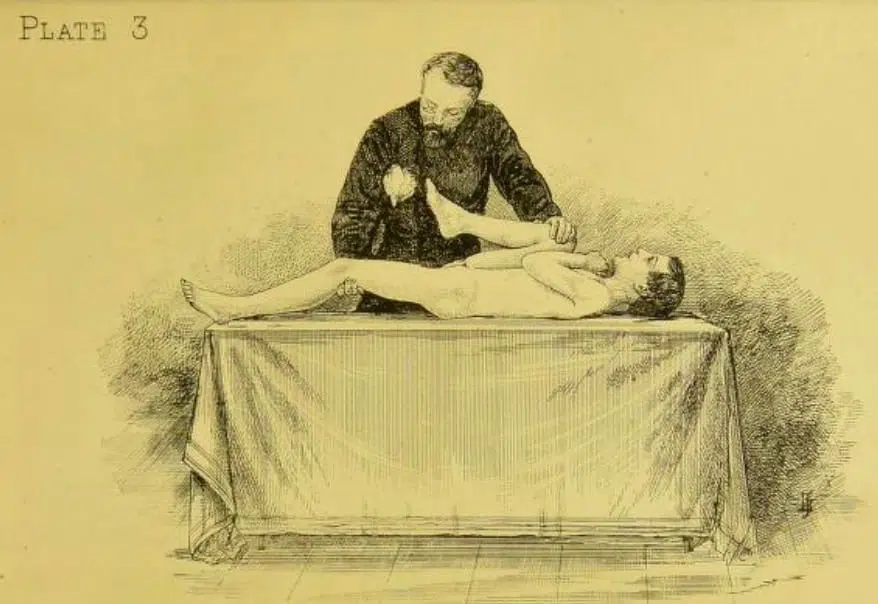
Thomas test illustration. From Hugh Thomas Owen's "Diseases of the hip, knee, and ankle joints: with their deformities, treated by a new and efficient method", 1875.

The Thomas test, is a method of detecting hip flexion contracture (fixed partial flexion of the hip) and to measure hip extensibility by having a patient lie flat on a firm bed/table whilst holding one knee to their chest. The opposite thigh is then observed for hip contracture and extensibility.

=== Thomas manoeuvre ===
Thomas's manoeuvre' is an orthopaedic investigation for fracture of the hip joint.

=== Thomas Collar ===
The Thomas's collar' was designed and applied to treat tuberculosis of the cervical vertebrae of the spine.

=== Thomas Wrench ===
The 'Thomas's wrench' was designed to reduce fractures and correct clubfeet. The club foot would be rolled between the two shorter cylinders to forcibly correct it.

=== Thomas Heel ===
The 'Thomas heel' is part of a shoe for children consisting of a heel one-half inch (12 mm) longer, and an eighth to a sixth of an inch (4 to 6 mm) higher on the inside. This is used to bring the heel of the foot into varus deformity, and to prevent depression in the region of the head of the ankle bone.

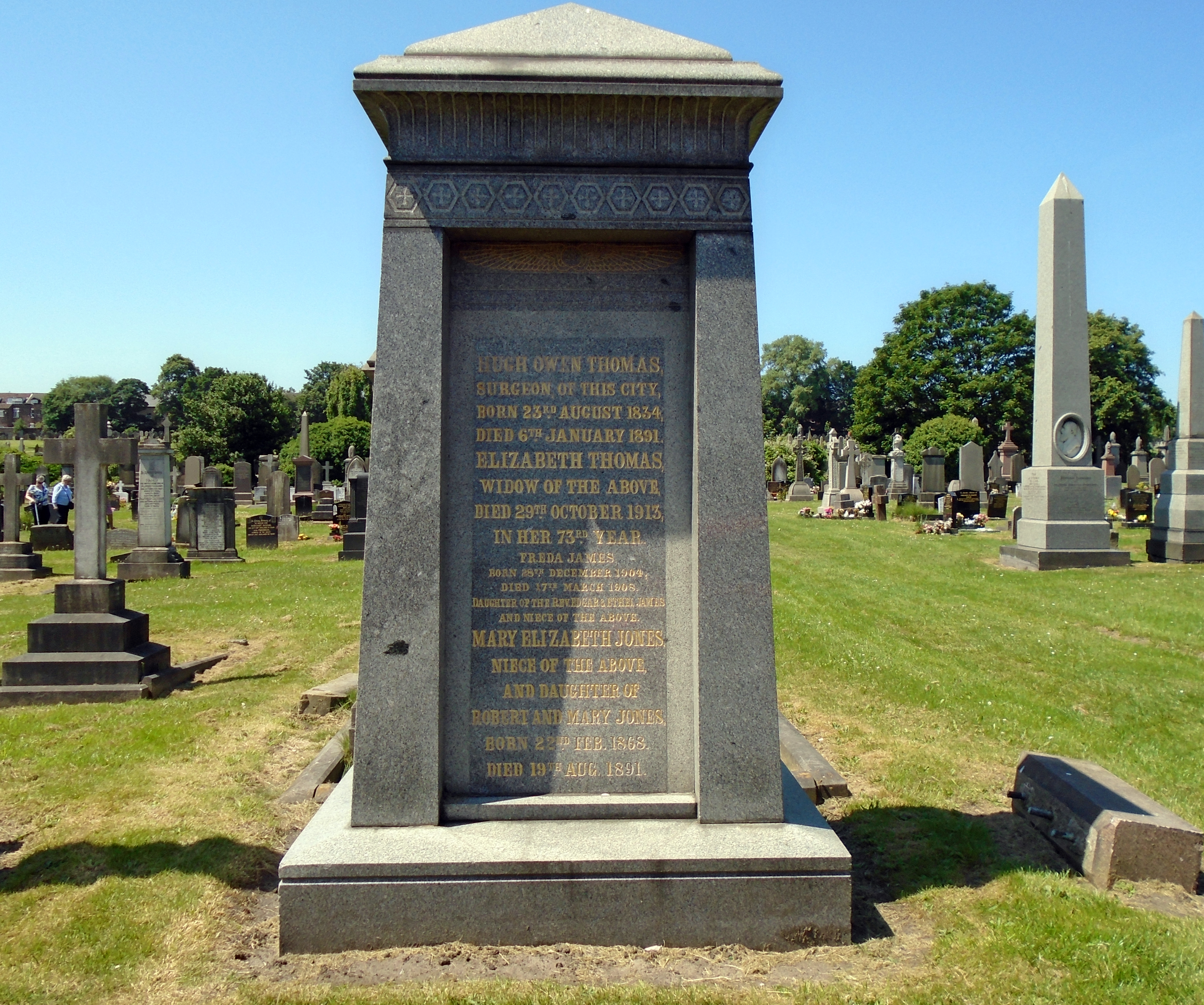
Memorial in Toxteth Park Cemetery

== Works ==
- Diseases of the hip, knee and ankle joints (1876)
- A review of the past and present treatment of disease in the hip, knee, and ankle joints: With their deformities (1878)
- The past and present treatment of intestinal obstructions (1879)
- The treatment of fractures of the lower jaw (1881)
- Intestinal disease and obstruction (1883)
- Nerve inhibition and its relation to the practice of medicine (1883)
- Principles of the treatment of diseased joints (1883)
- The collegian of 1666 and the collegians of 1885: Or, what is recognised treatment? (1885)
- The principles of the treatment of fractures and dislocations (1886)
- Fractures, dislocations, diseases and deformities of the bones of the trunk and upper extremities (1887)
- A new lithotomy operation (1888)
- An argument with the censor at St. Luke's Hospital, New York (1889)
- Fractures, dislocations, deformities and diseases of the lower extremities (1890)
- Lithotomy (1890)

== See also ==
List of Welsh medical pioneers
