= William Thelwall Thomas =

Welsh surgeon (1865–1927)

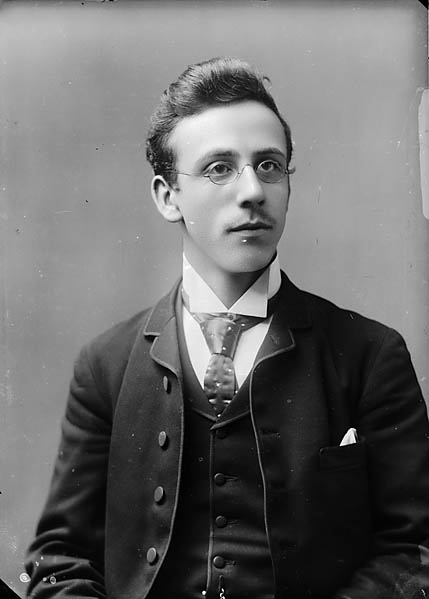
- Photograph by his father John Thomas
- Born: February 1865; Liverpool, England
- Died: 10 September 1927 (aged 62); Liverpool, England
- Occupation: Surgeon

Professor William Thelwall Thomas MBE, ChM, FRCS (February 1865 – 10 September 1927) was a Welsh surgeon who worked in Liverpool.

== Early life, family and education ==
Thomas was born in Liverpool in 1865, the son of the Welsh photographer John Thomas (1838–1905) and his wife Elizabeth. His father made a series of photographs of Thomas that are now in the collection of the National Library of Wales.

Thomas attended school at the Liverpool Institute and studied medicine at the University of Glasgow where he graduated in 1886.

== Career ==
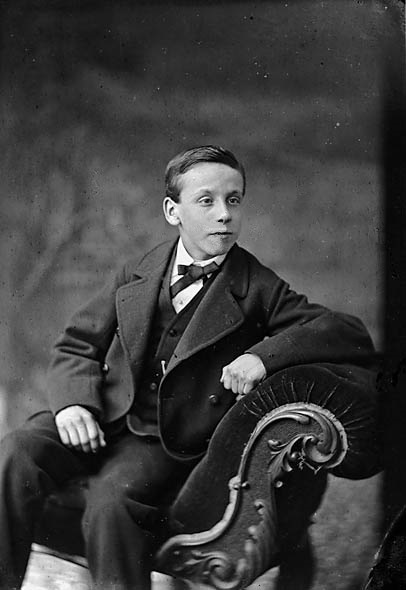
William Thelwall Thomas as a young man

Thomas decided to devote himself to work as a consultant surgeon to the exclusion of other medical work; this was unconventional at the time. He was appointed as an assistant surgeon at the Liverpool Royal Infirmary in 1892 and as a full surgeon there in 1907. In 1913 he was elected professor of Regional Surgery at the University of Liverpool, a position he held until his retirement in 1927.

Thomas became president of the surgical section of the British Medical Association in 1913. He was on the council of the Royal College of Surgeons from 1921 until his death.

Thomas was a fine and dexterous surgeon who was equally skilled at diagnosis. He pioneered the use of antiseptic techniques in Liverpool, following the principles of Joseph Lister to which he had been exposed as a student in Glasgow. He developed what is still the most common surgical treatment for varicose veins. The first planned appendectomy in Liverpool was performed by Thomas in 1895.

== Personal life and death ==
Thomas spoke Welsh fluently and maintained a close interest in Welsh affairs. In 1925 he was one of the presidents at the National Eisteddfod in Pwllheli.

Thomas was an active member of the Welsh Calvinistic Methodist Church (now the Presbyterian Church of Wales) and was for many years a Sunday school teacher. He was the medical officer of the Foreign Mission of the Presbyterian Church of Wales.

In 1892 he married Anabel Spence; they had no children. Anabel died in 1927, two months before her husband on 10 September 1927.

== See also ==
List of Welsh medical pioneers
