= Eluned Woodford-Williams =

Geriatrician

CBE FRCP FRCPsych Eluned Woodford-Williams
- Born: 12 September 1913; Liverpool, England
- Died: 25 November 1984 (aged 71); Sunderland, England
- Education: Liverpool College; Cardiff High School for Girls; Welsh National School of Medicine; University College Hospital
- Medical career
- Profession: Doctor
- Sub-specialties: Geriatrics

Eluned "Lyn" Woodford-Williams CBE FRCP FRCPsych (12 September 1913 – 25 November 1984) was a British geriatrician. As the leader of the geriatric unit at Sunderland, she was a pioneer in geriatric medicine and geriatric psychiatry.

== Early life ==
Eluned Woodford-Williams was born on 12 September 1913 in Liverpool. She was the eldest of four daughters born to John Woodford-Williams, a dentist, and Edith Mary Stevens. She began her schooling at Liverpool College, and after her family moved to Wales she attended Cardiff High School for Girls. She received a BSc from the Welsh National School of Medicine in 1933 before moving to London to complete her clinical training at University College Hospital, graduating as MBBS in 1936.

== Career ==
After qualifying, Woodford-Williams became a house physician at University College Hospital. She later became interested in paediatrics, taking up a position at Liverpool's Alder Hey Children's Hospital and gaining a Diploma in Child Health in 1938. She then moved to Redhill Hospital in Surrey as a resident medical officer, and in 1940 she was awarded an MD with a gold medal. She transferred to Manchester in 1942, working as an assistant physician at Manchester Royal Infirmary and Manchester Northern Hospital. After the war, she moved with her husband Dennis Astley Sanford to Sunderland, where he had been appointed a consultant surgeon. She did not work for several years, but in 1950 she began working for the Austrian geriatrician Oscar Olbrich, first as his senior registrar and later as an assistant physician.

When Olbrich died in 1958, Woodford-Williams succeeded him as the leader of the Sunderland geriatric unit; under her leadership, the unit gained an international reputation for geriatrics. She established the practice of admitting all patients over the age of 65 to the geriatric unit, regardless of their specific illness; this practice has since become the norm in many hospitals. Woodford-Williams, who petitioned the Royal College of Physicians to create a geriatrics committee, has been credited with establishing geriatrics as a distinct medical discipline. She was appointed director for the Health Advisory Service in 1973 and held the position for five years. During this time she influenced government policy on geriatric medicine and especially geriatric psychiatry. She also co-edited the journal Gerontologia Clinica.

== Later life ==
Woodford-Williams retired to Abersoch around 1980. She recovered from an episode of infective endocarditis but later died of heart failure on 25 November 1984 in Sunderland.

== Honours ==
Woodford-Williams was appointed Commander of the Order of the British Empire (CBE) in 1978. She was elected Fellow of the Royal College of Physicians (FRCP) in 1964 and Fellow of the Royal College of Psychiatrists (FRCPsych) in 1983 for her contributions to geriatric psychiatry. After her death, the Royal College of Psychiatrists introduced the Woodford-Williams Prize to be awarded for research in dementia prevention.

== See also ==
List of Welsh medical pioneers
