= Julian Tudor-Hart =

British general practitioner (1927–2018)

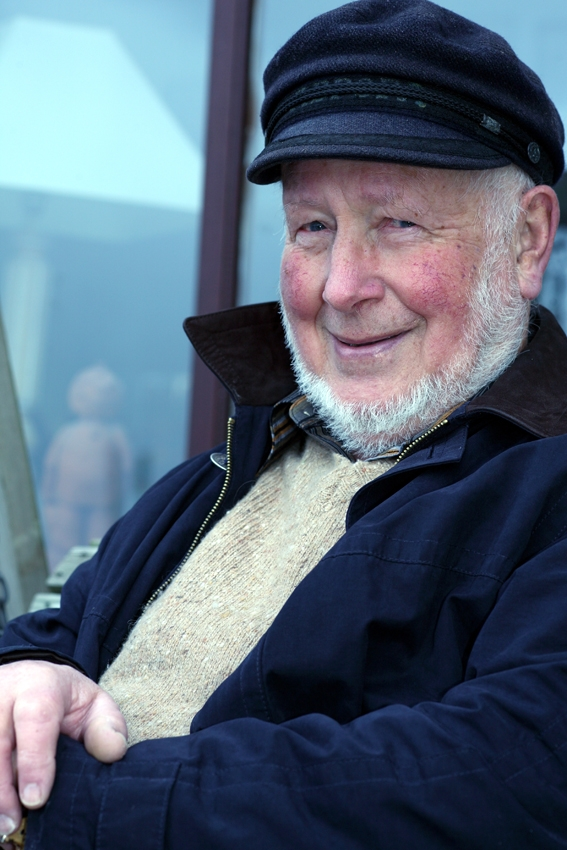
- Julian Tudor Hart (2007)
- Born: Alan Julian Macbeth Tudor-Hart; 9 March 1927; London, England
- Died: 1 July 2018 (aged 91)
- Education: University of Cambridge
- Years active: 1952–2018
- Known for: inverse care law
- Medical career
- Profession: doctor
- Field: general practitioner
- Research: health inequalities

Alan Julian Macbeth Tudor-Hart FRCGP FRCP (9 March 1927 – 1 July 2018), commonly known as Julian Tudor Hart, was a general practitioner (GP) who worked in Wales for 30 years. He introduced the concept of the inverse care law, and also produced medical research and wrote many books and medical articles.

== Early life ==
Hart was born in London on 9 March 1927, the son of Alexander Tudor-Hart and Alison Macbeth. He is a descendant of American businessman Frederic Tudor and Ephraim Hart, a Bavarian Jew who became a prominent merchant in New York, and was reportedly partners with John Jacob Astor. The name was originally Hirz. Julian's paternal grandfather, the Canadian artist Percyval Hart, married his Polish-French cousin Éléonora Délia Julie Aimée Hart Kleczkowska, and later changed the family surname to Tudor-Hart. Kleczkowska was the daughter of diplomat Michel Alexandre Cholewa, comte Kleczkowski (Michał Kleczkowski; 1818–1886) and granddaughter of Julie Sobieska, a direct descendant of John III Sobieski, king of Poland in the 17th century.

Julian studied medicine at Queens' College, Cambridge and then at St George's Hospital Medical School in London, graduating in 1952.

He was a member of the Sigerist Society from 1947 to 1955. He joined the Communist Party of Great Britain, following his father Alex, and stood unsuccessfully as the CPGB candidate for Aberavon at the 1964, 1966 and 1970 general elections.

== Career ==
In 1961, Hart moved to Glyncorrwg in Wales. There, he worked for 30 years as a general practitioner. One of his partners was Brian Gibbons, later minister for health in Wales. Hart became involved in epidemiological research, with Richard Doll and Archie Cochrane. He was a passionate advocate of the National Health Service and of socialism. He was President of the Socialist Health Association.

He was a Fellow of the Royal College of General Practitioners (RCGP) and the Royal College of Physicians (RCP).

In 2006, he was awarded the inaugural Discovery Prize by the RCGP as "a general practitioner who has captured the imagination of generations of GPs with his groundbreaking research". His practice in Glyncorrwg, Wales, was the first in the UK to be recognised as a research practice, piloting many Medical Research Council studies. He was also the first doctor to routinely measure every patient's blood pressure and as a result was able to reduce premature mortality in high risk patients at his practice by 30%. Graham Watt, professor of general practice at the University of Glasgow, nominated Tudor Hart for the award. Watt said: "His ideas and example pervade modern general practice and remain at the cutting edge of thinking and practice concerning health improvement in primary care. His work on hypertension showed how high quality records, teamwork and audit are the keys to health improvement. His life-long commitment to the daily tasks of general practice has always given his work and views a salience and credibility with fellow general practitioners. Julian Tudor Hart has been and will remain an inspiration to health practitioners and the communities they serve."

Hart died on 1 July 2018 at the age of 91 years.

== Author ==
He wrote many books and scientific articles. His last book, The Political Economy of Health Care: A Clinical Perspective explores how the NHS might be reconstituted as a humane service for all (rather than a profitable one for the few) and a civilising influence on society as a whole. The book provides 'a big picture' for students, academics, health professionals and NHS users that Tudor Hart hopes will inspire them to challenge received wisdoms about how the NHS should develop in the 21st century.

Hart lists nine (9) characteristics of the National Health Service in its founding that are distinctive and essential to it.

1. A united national service devoted directly and indirectly to care, fully available to all citizens.
2. A gift economy including everyone, funded by general taxation, of which the largest component was income tax.
3. Its most important inputs and processes are personal interactions between lay and professional people.
4. Its products were potentially measurable as health gains for the whole population.
5. Its staff and component units were not expected to compete for market share but to co-operate to maximise useful service.
6. Continuity was central to its efficiency and effectiveness.
7. Its local staff and local populations believed they had moral ownership of and loyalty to neighbourhood NHS units.
8. None of its decisions and few of its procedures could be fully standardised. All of its decisions entailed some uncertainty and doubt. They were therefore unsuited to commodity form, either for personal sale or for long-term contracts.
9. The NHS was a labour-intensive economy. Every new diagnostic or therapeutic machine generates new needs for more skilled staff able to control and interpret the work of the machines and translate them into human terms.

His other writing includes many articles on the management of high blood pressure and on the organisation of health services. His most influential, The Inverse Care Law, published in the Lancet 1971 asserts: "The availability of good medical care tends to vary inversely with the need for the population served. This inverse care law operates more completely where medical care is most exposed to market forces, and less so where such exposure is reduced."

== Publications ==
=== Scientific articles ===
- Hart, JT (1970). "Semi-continuous screening of a whole community for hypertension". Lancet. 2 (7666): 223–6. doi:10.1016/s0140-6736(70)92582-1. PMID 4193685.
- Hart, JT (1971). "The Inverse Care Law". Lancet. 1 (7696): 405–12. doi:10.1016/s0140-6736(71)92410-x. PMID 4100731.
- Hart, JT (1974). "Milroy Lecture: the marriage of primary care and epidemiology: continuous anticipatory care of whole populations in a state medical service". Journal of the Royal College of Physicians of London. 8 (4): 299–314. doi:10.1016/S0035-8819(25)03117-4. PMC 5366558. PMID 4842305.
- Hart, JT (1975). "Management of high blood pressure in general practice. Butterworth Gold Medal essay". Journal of the Royal College of General Practitioners. 25: 160–92.
- Hart, JT (1982). "The Black Report: a challenge to politicians". Lancet. 1 (8262): 35–7. doi:10.1016/s0140-6736(82)92569-7. S2CID 54393102.
- Hart, JT (1982). "Measurement of omission". British Medical Journal. 284 (6330): 1686–9. doi:10.1136/bmj.284.6330.1686. PMC 1498628. PMID 6805657.
- Watt, GCM; Foy, CJW; Hart, JT (1983). "Comparison of blood pressure, sodium intake, and other variables in offspring with and without a family history of high blood pressure". Lancet. 1 (8336): 1245–8. doi:10.1016/s0140-6736(83)92697-1. PMID 6134040. S2CID 43084087.
- Watt, GCM; Foy, CJW; Hart, JT; Bingham, G; Edwards, C; Hart, M; Thomas, E; Walton, P (1985). "Dietary sodium and arterial blood pressure: evidence against genetic susceptibility". British Medical Journal. 291 (6508): 1525–8. doi:10.1136/bmj.291.6508.1525. PMC 1418187. PMID 3933736.
- Hart, JT (1985). "Practice nurses: an underused resource". British Medical Journal. 290 (6476): 1162–3. doi:10.1136/bmj.290.6476.1162. PMC 1418831. PMID 3921138.
- Hart, JT; Humphreys, C (1987). "Be your own coroner: an audit of 500 consecutive deaths in a general practice". British Medical Journal. 294 (6576): 871–4. doi:10.1136/bmj.294.6576.871. PMC 1245930. PMID 3105783.
- Hart, JT (1990). "Primary medical care in Spain". British Journal of General Practice. 40 (335): 255–8. PMC 1371114. PMID 2117951.
- Hart, JT; Thomas, C; Gibbons, B; Edwards, C; Hart, M; Jones, J; Jones, M; Walton, P (1991). "Twenty-give years of audited screening in a socially deprived community". British Medical Journal. 302 (6791): 1509–13. doi:10.1136/bmj.302.6791.1509. PMC 1670219. PMID 1855023.
- Hart JT. "Two paths for medical practice. The Lancet 1992 sept 26; 340
- Hart, JT (1992). "Rule of halves: implications of increasing diagnosis and reducing dropout for future workload and prescribing costs in primary care". British Journal of General Practice. 42 (356): 116–9. PMC 1371996. PMID 1493028.
- Hart, JT; Edwards, C; Haines, AP; Hart, M; Jones, J; Jones, M; Watt, GCM (1993). "High blood pressure screen-detected under 40: a general practice population followed for 21 years". British Medical Journal. 306 (6875): 437–40. doi:10.1136/bmj.306.6875.437. PMC 1676534. PMID 8461729.
- Hart, JT (1995). "Clinical and economic consequences of patients as producers". Journal of Public Health Medicine. 17 (4): 383–6. PMID 8639335.
- Hart, JT; Dieppe, P (1996). "Caring effects". Lancet. 347 (9015): 1606–8. doi:10.1016/s0140-6736(96)91083-1. PMID 8667874. S2CID 12002041.
- Hart, JT (1998). "Our feet set on a new path entirely: To the transformation of primary care and partnership with patients (Editorial)". British Medical Journal. 317 (7150): 1–2. doi:10.1136/bmj.317.7150.1. JSTOR 25179698. PMC 1113443. PMID 9651255.
- Hart, JT (1998). "Thoughts from an old GP". Lancet. 352 (9121): 51–2. doi:10.1016/s0140-6736(98)02430-1. PMID 9800764. S2CID 54427392.
- Hart JT. The National Health Service as precursor for future society. 2002

=== Books ===
- Hart JT. The National Health Service: in England and Wales. Communist Party of Great Britain; 1970.
- Hart JT, Communist Party of Great Britain. The National Health Service in England and Wales: a marxist perspective. London Health Students Branch. Research and Study Group, Marxists in Medicine; 1971.
- Hypertension: community control of high blood pressure. First edition. 1980.
- Hart JT. An exchange of letters: hospital referrals. MSD Foundation; 1985.
- A new kind of doctor: the general practitioner’s part in the health of the community. London: Merlin Press; 1988.
- Hart JT, Stilwell B, Gray M. Prevention of coronary heart disease and stroke: a workbook for primary care teams. Faber; 1988.
- Hart JT, Pickering G. Hipertensión: su control en la comunidad. Doyma; 1989.
- Hypertension: community control of high blood pressure. Third edition. Oxford: Radcliffe Medical Press; 1993.
- Feasible Socialism: National Health Service past, present and future. London: Socialist Health Association; 1994
- Going for Gold: a new approach to primary medical care in the South Wales valleys. Swansea: Socialist Health Association; 1997.
- Going to the doctor. In: Cooter R, Pickstone J (eds). Medicine in the 20th Century. Amsterdam: Harwood Academic Publishers; 2000. p. 543-58.
- Hart JT, Savage W, Fahey T. High Blood Pressure at Your Fingertips: The Comprehensive and Medically Accurate Manual on How to Manage Your High Blood Pressure. McGraw-Hill Australia; 2003.
- What you need to know in nine pages. In: Fahey T, Murphy D, Hart JT. High Blood Pressure. Excerpt from High Blood Pressure at your fingertips. Third edition: London: Class Publishing; 2004.
- Hart JT. Storming the Citadel: from romantic fiction to effective reality. In: Michael PF, Webster C (eds). Health and Society in Twentieth Century Wales. University of Wales Press; 2006. p. 208-15.
- The Political Economy of Health Care: A clinical perspective. Bristol: Policy Press; 2006.
- Hart JT. La economía política de la sanidad. Una perspectiva clínica. Madrid: Ediciones GPS Madrid; 2009.
- Hart JT. The political economy of health care: Where the NHS came from and where it could lead (2 ed). Bristol: Policy Press; 2010.

== Bibliography ==
- Watt, Graham (2015). "Include me out, exclude you in". British Journal of General Practice. 65 (637): 431–432. doi:10.3399/bjgp15X686317. PMC 4513734. PMID 26212842.

== See also ==
- List of Welsh medical pioneers
