= Inverse care law =

Adage about availability of health care

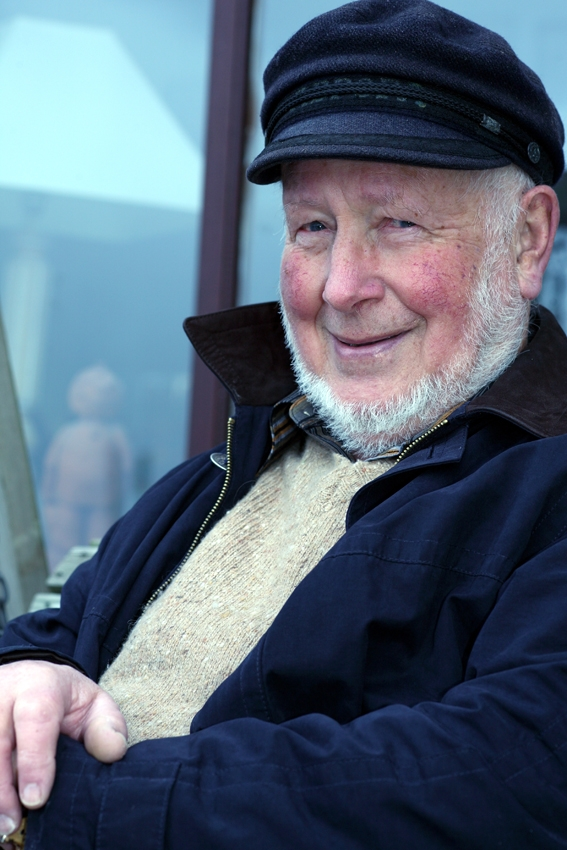
Julian Tudor Hart (London, 1927 - 2018)

The inverse care law is the principle that the availability of good medical or social care tends to vary inversely with the need of the population served. Proposed by Julian Tudor Hart in 1971, the term has since been widely adopted. It is considered a landmark publication in the history of The Lancet. The name is a pun on inverse-square law, a term and concept from physics.

The law states that:

"The availability of good medical care tends to vary inversely with the need for it in the population served. This ... operates more completely where medical care is most exposed to market forces, and less so where such exposure is reduced."

Hart later paraphrased his argument: "To the extent that health care becomes a commodity it becomes distributed just like champagne. That is rich people get lots of it. Poor people don’t get any of it."

The Inverse Care Law is a key issue in debates about the provision of health care and health inequality. As Frank Dobson put it when he was United Kingdom Secretary of State for Health: "Inequality in health is the worst inequality of all. There is no more serious inequality than knowing that you'll die sooner because you're badly off."

== See also ==
- Health policy
- Inverse benefit law
- Patient safety
- Public health
