= Thomas test =

- Purpose: To rule out hip flexion contracture & psoas syndrome.

The Thomas test is a physical examination test, named after the Welsh orthopaedic surgeon, Hugh Owen Thomas (1834–1891), to rule out hip flexion contracture (fixed partial flexion of the hip) and psoas syndrome (injury to the psoas muscle).

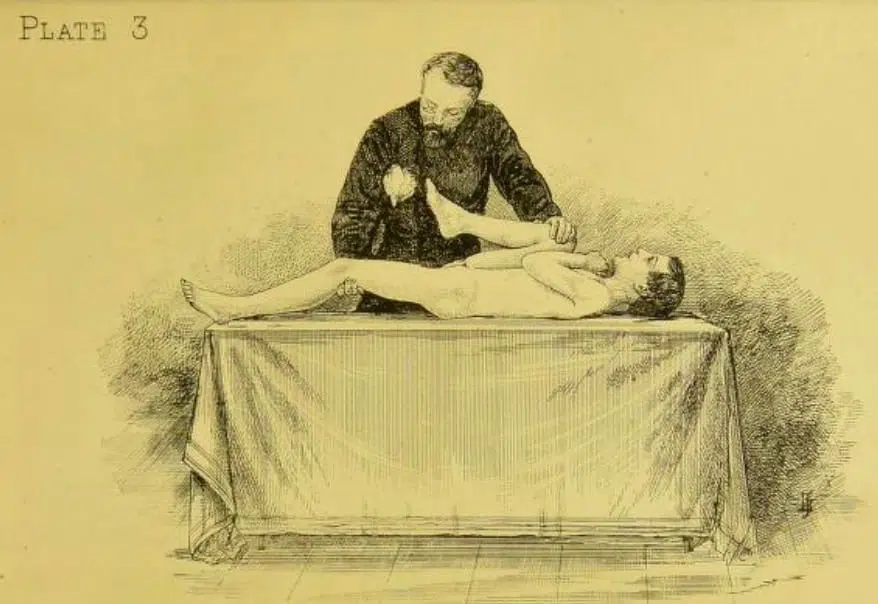
Illustration of the Thomas test. From Hugh Thomas Owen's "Diseases of the hip, knee, and ankle joints: with their deformities, treated by a new and efficient method", 1875.

== Description ==
The test consists of 3 steps:

- Step 1: The patient lies supine on the examination table, holding their knee to their chest. The clinician passes the palm of her/his hand beneath the patient's spine to identify lumbar lordosis.
- Step 2: The "unaffected" hip is flexed until the thigh just touches the abdomen to obliterate the lumbar lordosis. The pelvis should be in neutral tilt (not tilted anteriorly or posteriorly).
- Step 3: The clinician then passively ranges the affected hip into extension. Once the pelvis begins to tilt anteriorly, stop the passive range of motion, hold the affected thigh in this position, and measure the angle between the affected thigh and table to reveal the fixed flexion deformity of the hip.

It is important to control the pelvic tilt to ensure that the Thomas test is valid for evaluating peak hip extension angle.

== Interpretation ==
If the iliopsoas muscle is shortened, or a contracture is present, the lower extremity on the involved side will be unable to fully extend at the hip. This constitutes a positive Thomas test. Sometimes, with a very flexible patient, the Thomas test will be normal despite a psoas dysfunction being present. However, in the patient with a normal hip joint, a positive test is a good indicator of psoas hypertonicity.

Other signs from the Thomas test:

- opposite/ contralateral hip flexes without knee extension- tight iliopsoas
- hip abducts during the test- tight tensor fasciae latae
- knee extension occurs- tight rectus femoris
- Lateral rotation of tibia- tight biceps femoris

The hip flexion contracture is physiologic in the first 3 months of life and if it is absent in this period it may be a sign of developmental dysplasia of the hip. It is used to identify unilateral fixed flexion deformity of the hip.

== Risk factors & associations ==
Psoas syndrome is often associated with runners, dancers, and gymnasts who complain of hip "stiffness" and reported "snapping" feeling when flexing at the waist.
