= Traction splint =

Medical item that helps direct bone growth in the hip

- Specialty: Orthopedic

A traction splint most commonly refers to a splinting device that uses straps attaching over the pelvis or hip as an anchor, a metal rod(s) to mimic normal bone stability and limb length, and a mechanical device to apply traction (used in an attempt to reduce pain, realign the limb, and minimize vascular and neurological complication) to the limb.

The use of traction splints to treat complete long bone fractures of the femur is common in prehospital care. Evidence to support their usage, however, is poor. A dynamic traction splint has also been developed for intra-articular fractures of the phalanges of the hand.

== Medical uses ==
Traction splints are most commonly used for fractures of the femur (or upper leg bone). For these fractures they may reduce pain and decrease the amount of bleeding which occurs into the soft tissues of the leg.

Some state that they are appropriate for middle tibia fractures which are displaced or bent. Others state they should not be used for lower leg fractures. Often a pillow splint or rigid splint is best in this situation. All agree that traction splints should only be applied when there are no fractures of the pelvis or knee and the fracture has not broken through the skin with bone visible.

Use of a traction splint while other fractures in the leg exist will cause the weaker fracture site to pull apart and not the targeted femur fracture.

== Models ==
There are two groups of traction splints:

- The Thomas half-ring group, which includes the Thomas splint, the modified Thomas splint, the QD-4 Hare traction splint and the Donway traction splint
- Non-half-ring group, which includes the Sager splint, and the most advanced; CT-EMS, Carbon Fiber traction system.

The basic principle is that one end of the traction splint is positioned against the hip, and pushes upward against the pelvic bone. A strap around the foot and ankle is connected to the other end of the splint, and tightened to counteract the muscle tension and produce traction. Only then are additional straps added to aid immobilization of the limb.

The Thomas half-ring splints consist of a padded half-circle of steel which is strapped to the hip, hinged to a U-shaped rod that extends along both sides of the leg. An ankle strap may be fashioned from cloth, and tied or twisted to apply traction force. It was devised by H.O. Thomas, initially for immobilization for tuberculosis of the knee. It is now commonly used for the immobilization of hip and thigh injuries.

The modified Thomas splint adapted the original Thomas splint to include a traction screw and foot plate and limb support built into the splint body.

The Hare traction splint is a further adaptation of the Thomas splint. Its length is adjustable via telescoping rods, and it has built-in straps to support the hip and leg at several points along its length. It also provides a more comfortable ankle strap and a small winch that makes it much easier to apply and adjust traction force.

The Sager splint consists of a metallic splint that is placed between the person's legs. Some models may be placed on the side closest to the injury for bilateral femur fractures without pelvic trauma. Straps are then applied, first at the thigh and then at the ankle, to strap the injured leg to the pole and provide support. The pole is extended to supply the needed traction, and then both legs are wrapped with "tensor cravats" (strap-like bandages, in this application usually elastic, to supply tension.)

The Kendrick traction device (KTD) eliminates the need for leg-raising and unnecessary rolling of the patient, and can be easily applied to both pediatric and adult applications. It consists of a round pole that can be located on the lateral aspect of the leg, with straps at the upper thigh and ankle for immediate placement, and three wider straps for immobilization. It is very light at 20 ounces. The KTD does not afford the rotational stability normally seen in long bone traction splints.

The CT-6 was introduced in the 21st century and utilizes a 4:1 pulley system to achieve precise and powerful, when necessary, traction. This splint is built with carbon fiber tubing and weighs 500 grams. In 2003 the CT-6 was chosen as the splint of choice by the US military and currently has over 30,000 in the field. Its compact and light design, along with its greatly improved traction method, had greatly enhanced its popularity.

The Donway traction splint is a pneumatic splint that can be applied to a patient in situ. Acting on the ankle and groin pressure is then applied via an integrated pump. The devices itself consists of a metal frame that surrounds the leg that is then strapped into place.

The STS (Slishman Traction Splint) is another lateral monopole traction splint. It is lightweight and compact, however, it differs from the KTD and CT-6 in that it does not stick out past the foot. It offers a proximal point of traction, rather than distal, making it better suited for tight transports in ambulances, helicopters or baskets. The STS can also be used despite lower extremity trauma, because the distal strap can be applied proximal to the calf or patella. Rotational stability is provided by one mid leg strap which can be wrapped around both legs.

Dynamic traction splint

=== Dynamic traction splint ===
In 1986, Robert R. Schenck used the same principles applied to treating femur fractures to develop a device for treating intra-articular fractures of the finger. The apparatus consists of a 6-inch-diameter circular splint that provides a rigid arc, with a 3-inch radius equidistant from the involved joint. A wire is placed horizontally through the distal head of the middle phalanx. The wire is attached by rubber band to a movable component attached to the hoop of the splint. The amount of traction can be controlled by using different types of rubber bands or tying knots in them.

== History ==
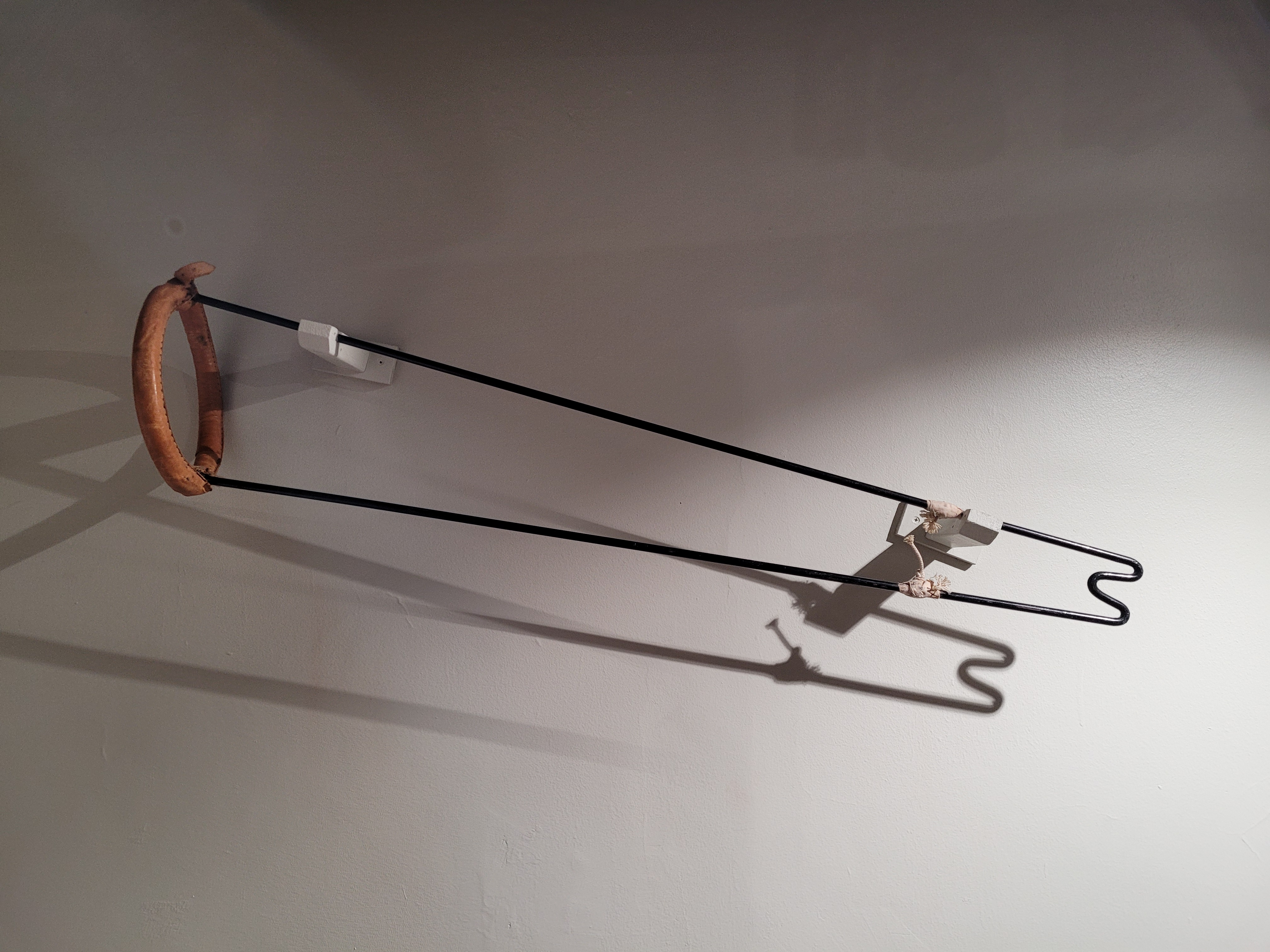
Thomas splint on display at Thackray Museum of Medicine

The first widely used model of traction splint was introduced by Hugh Owen Thomas, a nineteenth-century Welsh surgeon, considered by many to be the father of modern orthopaedic surgery. The splint was used extensively in the First World War. Surgeon Sir Henry Gray reported that in a battle in which the Thomas splint was used to treat the majority of femoral fractures, the mortality rate dropped from 80% to 15.6%.

As the war progressed, the Thomas splint became a routine part of a stretcher bearer's equipment. Stretcher bearers trained to apply the splint with blindfolds on, ensuring that they were capable of doing it at night in No Man's Land.
