= Bradshaw Lecture =

The Bradshaw Lectures are lectureships given at the invitation of the Royal College of Physicians and the Royal College of Surgeons of England. It is held on alternate years in rotation with the Hunterian Oration.

== List of past lecturers at Royal College of Physicians ==
- 2018 Sir Leszek Borysiewicz How do we improve outcomes in cancer?
- 2016 Paul Cockwell Chronic Kidney Disease
- 2014 Catherine Nelson Piercy Connective tissue disease in pregnancy
- 2013 Gregory Y H Lip, Modern management of atrial fibrillation: a focus on stroke prevention
- 2012 Peter Calverley, COPD – current therapeutics and their evidence base
- 2011 Geraint H. Lewis, Predicting and preventing unplanned hospital admissions
- 2010 Mark W. Elliot, Non-invasive ventilation – established and expanding roles
- 2009 Loic Guillevin, Clinical trials and vasculitis
- 2008 Anne Phillips Initiation and perpetuation of renal injury in diabetes mellitus
- 2007 Alastair Compston, Great Expectations: the Clinical Science of Multiple Sclerosis
- 2006 Anthony P. Weetman, Thyroid disease: Mechanisms and Management
- 2005 Sir Leszek Borysiewicz, The Global Public Health Challenge
- 2004 Peter Stanley Harper, Genetics and the practice of clinical medicine
- 2003 George Davey Smith, The Epidemiology of Illness in Deprived Populations
- 2002 Liam Donaldson, An organization with a memory
- 2000 Garret Adare FitzGerald
- 1999 Paul Corris
- 1997
- 1996 Timothy M Cox
- 1993
- 1992 Herman Waldmann
- 1991 Alan John Camm on Cardiac Arrhythmias
- 1989 David Alan Warrell, Rabies one hundred years after Pasteur
- 1988 Sir Magdi Yacoub
- 1987 John Douglas Swales, Blood pressure: from cells to populations
- 1986 (William) Ian McDonald, The pathogenesis of multiple sclerosis
- 1985 Sir Keith Peters
- 1983 Celia Mary Oakley, Infective endocarditis – new challenges to old assumptions
- 1982 E. J. Holborow [Eric John Holborow], Rheumatoid arthritis – is EB virus a red herring?
- 1981 R. D. Cohen [Robert Donald Cohen], Some acid problems
- 1980 Kurt George Matthew Mayer Alberti, Insulin Treatment and Diabetes: Half a Century of Therapeutic Misadventure?
- 1979 Desmond G. Julian, The significance and management of ventricular arrhythmias
- 1978 Patrick L. Mollison, Some Clinical Consequences of Red Cell Incompatibility
- 1977 Robert Frederick Mahler, Fat: the good, the bad and the ugly
- 1976 William Walton Gooddy, Time and the nervous system: the neuron as an escapement
- 1975 Frank Dudley Hart, Inflammatory disease and its control in the different rheumatic disorders
- 1974 Colin Dollery, Individual differences in response to drugs
- 1973 John Fisher Stokes, Diagnostic approaches in liver disease
- 1972 John David Spillane, Geography of Neurology
- 1971 Norman Henry Ashton, The Eye in Malignant Hypertension
- 1970 Clifford Frank Hawkins, Diarrhoea: changing concepts and new diagnoses
- 1969 John Freeman Loutit, Malignancy from Radium and its Analogues
- 1968 Paul Bruce Beeson, Association of Specific Infections with Other Diseases
- 1967 Clifford Wilson, The cause and prognosis of the nephrotic syndrome
- 1966 David W. Smithers, Hodgkin's Disease
- 1965 Douglas Andrew Kilgour Black, The renal rete mirabile
- 1964 M. I. A. Hunter [Mark Ian Alastair Hunter], Medical education and medical practice (delivered 1965)
- 1963 Malcolm D. Milne, Disorders of amino-acid transport
- 1962 Graham Malcolm Wilson, Diuretics
- 1961 Sheila Sherlock, Jaundice
- 1960 W. I. Card [Wilfrid Ingram Card], The concept of gastric secretory cell mass
- 1959 Alan Kekwick, On Adiposity
- 1958 Kenneth W. Donald. Heart Disease and Exercise
- 1957 Aubrey J. Lewis, Between Guesswork and Certainty in Psychiatry
- 1956 William Phillips, The Disintegrative Action of the Nervous System
- 1955 Denis John Williams, Structure of emotions reflected in epileptic experiences
- 1954 Francis Henry Knethell Green, The Clinical Evaluation of Remedies
- 1953 Edward J. Wayne, The Diagnosis of Thyrotoxicosis
- 1952 Richard Raymond Bomford, Changing Concepts of Health and Disease, with Particular Reference to "Psychosomatic Medicine"
- 1951 Denis Hubert Brinton, The selection of medical students.
- 1950 Edward Revill Cullinan Clinical Interpretation of Jaundice
- 1949 John Guyett Scadding, Sarcoidosis, with Special Reference to Lung Changes
- 1948 J. A. Charles [John Alexander Charles], Victorian medical administrators and their significance today
- 1947 Janet Vaughan, The Anaemia associated with Trauma and Sepsis
- 1946 Davis Evan Bedford, Hypertensive Heart Disease
- 1945 Walter Russell Brain, Speech and Handedness
- 1944 C. Bruce Perry, Aetiology of Erythema Nodosum
- 1943 James William Brown, Interauricular Septal Defect
- 1942 MacDonald Critchley on Survival at Sea
- 1940 James Calvert Spence, On the Nature of Disease in Infancy
- 1939 Henry Cohen, 1st Baron Cohen of Birkenhead
- 1938 Lionel Ernest Whitby, Chemotherapy of Bacterial Infections
- 1937 Edward Alfred Cockayne, Genetics of Transposition of the Viscera
- 1936 Edward Mapother, The Integration of Neurology and Psychiatry
- 1935 Daniel T. Davies, Peptic ulcer
- 1934 Joseph Harold Sheldon, Haemochromatosis
- 1933 Charles Samuel Myers, A Psychological Regard of Medical Education
- 1931 John Shields Fairbairn, The Medical and Psychological Aspects of Gynaecology
- 1930 Sir William Errington Hume, Paroxysmal Tachycardia
- 1929 Alexander D. Blackader, The Varying Virulence of Micro-Organisms in Infectious Disease
- 1928 Alexander George Gibson, Pyelitis and Pyelonephritis
- 1927 John Foster Gaskell, The Pathology of Pneumonia
- 1926 Francis Graham Crookshank, The Theory of Diagnosis.
- 1925 Edwin Bramwell. Muscular dystrophies
- 1924 Frederic John Poynton, On the Prevention of Acute Rheumatism
- 1923 John Hay, Angina Pectoris;Some Points in Prognosis
- 1922 Maurice Craig, Mental Symptoms in Physical Disease
- 1921 Michael Comport Grabham, Subtropical Esculents
- 1920 Cecil Wall, Chorea
- 1918 William Aldren Turner, Neuroses and psychoses of war
- 1917 Ernest Septimus Reynolds, Causes of Disease
- 1916 Hector Mackenzie, On Exophthalmic Goitre
- 1915 John Michell Clarke, On Nervous Affections of the Sixth and Seventh Decades of Life
- 1913 Thomas Robinson Glynn, On Hysteria in some its Aspects
- 1912 David Bridge Lees, The Diagnosis and Treatment of Incipient Pulmonary Tuberculosis
- 1911 Graham Steell, Intrathoracic Tumours and Aneurysms in their Clinical
- 1910 George Newton Pitt, The Results of Bronchial Obstruction
- 1909 James Alexander Lindsay, Darwinism and Medicine
- 1908 William Pasteur, Massive Collapse of the Lung
- 1907 James Barr, The Pleurae: Pleural Effusion and its Treatment
- 1906 Seymour John Sharkey, Rectal Alimentation
- 1905 George Redmayne Murray, Exophthalmic Goitre and its Treatment
- 1904 Frederick F. Caiger, Treatment of Enteric Fever
- 1903 Edmund Fauriel Trevelyan, Tuberculosis of the Nervous System
- 1902 Charles James Cullingworth, Intraperitoneal Haemorrhage Incident to Ectopic Gestation
- 1901 Judson S. Bury, Prognosis in Relation to Disease of the Nervous System
- 1900 Sir Archibald Garrod, Urinary Pigments in their Pathological Aspects
- 1899 Arthur Foxwell, Causation of Functional Heart Murmurs
- 1898 William M. Ord, Myxœdema and Allied Disorders
- 1897 E. Markham Skerritt, Prognosis in Heart Disease
- 1896 William Gowers, Subjective sensations of sound
- 1895 John Buckley Bradbury, On some new Vaso-dilators
- 1894 Thomas Barlow, Infantile Scurvy and its Relation to Rickets
- 1893 William Smith Greenfield, Some Diseases of the Thyroid Gland
- 1892 Samuel Gee, On the Signs of Acute Peritoneal Diseases
- 1891 William Henry Allchin, The Nature and Causes of Duodenal Indigestion
- 1890 Robert Saundby, Morbid Anatomy of Diabetes Mellitus
- 1889 Norman Moore, The Distribution and Duration of Visceral New Growths
- 1888 William Carter, Uremia
- 1887 Samuel Hatch West, Pneumothorax
- 1886 Julius Dreschfeld, Diabetic Coma
- 1885 James Frederic Goodhart, Morbid Arterial Tension - A Review
- 1884 George Hare Philipson, Pathological Relations of the Absorbent System
- 1883 John Wickham Legg, Cardiac Aneurysms
- 1882 Edward Long Fox, The Influence of the Sympathetic System on Disease
- 1881 George Vivian Poore, Nervous Affections of the Hand (Inaugural Lecture)

== List of past lecturers at Royal College of Surgeons of England ==
The lecture is biennial (annual until 1993) on a topic in the field of surgery, customarily given by a senior member of the Council on or about the day preceding the second Thursday of December. (Given in alternate years, with the Hunterian Oration given in the intervening years).

- 2016 Nigel Hunt
- 2014 Antony Narula
- 2012 Irving Taylor on Surgical professionalism
- 2010 Richard Collins
- 2008 Anne Moore
- 2006 Valerie Lund
- 2004 David Dandy
- 2002 Leela Kapila
- 2000 Averil Mansfield
- 1998 Sir Barry Jackson
- 1996 H Brendan Devlin
- 1994 Adrian Marston
- 1992 Sir Rodney Sweetnam, Bone Tumour Surgery- yet another Sub-specialty?
- 1991 John Alexander-Williams
- 1990 Robert Owen
- 1989 Terence Kennedy, Billroth to Black-A Century of Peptic Ulcer Surgery
- 1988 William John Wells Sharrard
- 1987 Phyllis George, Obstructive Jaundice – Whose problem?
- 1986 Harold Ellis, The treatment of breast cancer: a study in evolution
- 1985 Michael Tempest Reilly
- 1984 Alan Graham Apley
- 1983 Sir David Innes Williams, Paediatric urology in the evolution of surgery
- 1982 Peter Gilroy Bevan
- 1981 Sir Reginald Sydney Murley, Venous Thromboembolism – Challenge and Fulfilment?
- 1980 Harry Hubert Grayson Eastcott, The Total Care of the Arteriosclerotic Patient
- 1979 Desmond Gareth Julian, The significance and management of ventricular arrhythmias
- 1978 John Cedric Goligher, Recent Trends in the Treatment of Carcinoma of the Rectum
- 1977 Sir Rodney Smith, Tumours of the Liver
- 1976 Selwyn Taylor, Thyroid medullary carcinoma: a new endocrine syndrome
- 1975 Ronald W. Raven, Oncology : attainment and anticipation
- 1974 Richard S. Handley, Carcinoma of the Breast
- 1973 Richard H Franklin, Oesophogeal Cancer
- 1972 Norman Capener, Vertebral Exploration
- 1971 Henry Osmond-Clarke, Hip Joint Surgery in the 20th century
- 1970 Robert V. Cooke, The Challenge and Fascination of Biliary Tract Surgery
- 1969 Sir Thomas Holmes Sellors, Atrial Septal Defects
- 1968 Harold Edwards, Crohn's Disease
- 1967 R. Milnes Walker, Cancer in South-West England
- 1966 Charles Wells, The Small Intestine
- 1965 Sir Hedley Atkins, Cancer of the Breast
- 1964 C. Naunton Morgan, Carcinoma of the Rectum
- 1963 Sir Clement Price Thomas, Pulmonary Tuberculosis in Retrospect and Prospect
- 1962 Eric Riches, Carcinoma of the Kidney
- 1961 Digby Chamberlain, The Spleen and its Removal
- 1960 Stanford Cade, Malignant Melanoma
- 1959 A. Dickson Wright, Surgery of the Biliary Tract
- 1958 Archibald McIndoe, Reconstruction of the Burned Face
- 1957 Sir Russell Brock, The Present Position of Cardiac Surgery
- 1956 A. Lawrence Abel (replacing R.P.Scott Mason, deceased), Diagnosis and Treatment of Disease of the Large Intestine
- 1955 Sir Cecil Wakeley, Hunter and Surgical Research
- 1954 Lambert C. Rogers, Tumours Involving the Spinal Cord and its Nerve Roots
- 1953 Sir Reginald Watson-Jones, Fracture treatment in the next half century
- 1952 (delivered June 1953) Sir James Paterson Ross, Some Unsolved Problems in the Surgery of the Sympathetic Nervous System
- 1951 Sir Ernest Frederick Finch, The Approach to Specialism
- 1950 Harry Platt, Diagnosis and Prognosis in Sarcomas of Bone
- 1949 V. Zachary Cope, Visceral Actinomycosis
- 1948 Lionel E.C. Norbury, Proctology throughout the Ages
- 1947 Sir Cecil Wakeley, Vogue and Fashion in Abdominal Surgery
- 1946 Sir Heneage Ogilvie, Surgical Handicraft
- 1945 C. Max Page, Survey of Fracture Treatment
- 1944 Sir William Girling Ball
- 1943 Henry S.Souttar, Physics and the Surgeon
- 1942 Leonard Ralph Braithwaite, The Role of Bile in Duodenal Regurgitation
- 1941 Sir Gordon Gordon-Taylor, Abdominal Injuries of Modern warfare
- 1940 Sir Alfred Webb-Johnson, Pride and Prejudice in the Treatment of Cancer
- 1939 James Walton, Surgery of the Common Bileduct
- 1938 Sir Robert Ernest Kelly, Recurrent peptic ulceration, causes of, and design for second operation on stomach
- 1937 Sir Charles Gordon-Watson, The Origin and Spread of Cancer of the Rectum in Relation to Surgical Treatment
- 1936 Hugh Lett, The Early Diagnosis and Treatment of Renal Tuberculosis
- 1935 George Grey Turner on carcinoma of the oesophagus
- 1934 William Francis Victor Bonney, The Functional Derangement of the Intestine that follows Abdominal Operations
- 1933 Arthur H. Burgess, Electrosurgery
- 1932 George Edward Gask, The Surgery of the Sympathetic Nervous System
- 1931 Sampson Handley, Chronic Mastitis
- 1930 J. Herbert Fisher, Ocular Muscles, Movements and Judgements
- 1929 Robert Pugh Rowlands, On the Surgery of the Gall Bladder and Bile Ducts
- 1928 Charles Herbert Fagge, Axial Rotation
- 1927 Cuthbert Sidney Wallace, A review of prostatic enlargement
- 1926 Ernest W. Hey Groves, Some Contributions to the Reconstructive Surgery of the Hip
- 1925 James Sherren, Gastrojejunostomy
- 1924 Raymond Johnson, Simple and malignant tumours of the breast
- 1923 Walter George Spencer, Melanosis (Melanin; Melanoma; Melanotic Cancer)
- 1922 William Thorburn, On the Surgery of the Spinal Cord 146
- 1921 Sir Holburt Jacob Waring, Operative Treatment of Malignant Disease
- 1920 Berkeley Moynihan, The Spleen and some of its Diseases
- 1919 Sir Charles Alfred Ballance, The Surgery of the Heart
- 1918 D'Arcy Power, Cancer of the Tongue
- 1917 Sir John Bland-Sutton, Misplaced and Missing Organs.
- 1916 Charters James Symonds, Laminectomy in Gunshot Injuries of the Spinal Cord
- 1915 Sir Anthony Bowlby, Wounds in War
- 1914 Sir Frederic Eve, Acute Haemorrhagic Pancreatitis
- 1913 Sir George Henry Makins, Gunshot Injuries of the Arteries
- 1912 Charles Mansell Moullin, The Biology of Tumours
- 1911 Richard Clement Lucas, Some Points in Heredity
- 1910 Alfred Pearce Gould, Cancer
- 1909 Francis Richardson Cross, The Brain Structures concerned in Vision
- 1908 Sir William Watson Cheyne, The Treatment of Wounds
- 1907 Sir Rickman J Godlee, Prognosis in Relation to Treatment of Tuberculosis of the Genito-urinary Organs
- 1906 Edmund Owen, Cancer, its Treatment by Modern Methods
- 1905 Henry Trentham Butlin, Carcinoma is a Parasitic Disease
- 1904 Arthur William Mayo Robson, Cancer and Its Treatment
- 1903 Sir Henry Morris, On Cancer and its Origin
- 1902 Howard Marsh, Septic Arthritis
- 1901 Thomas R. Jessop, Nephrectomy, Nephrolithotomy, and Lithotomy
- 1900 John Langton, The association of inguinal hernia with the descent of the testis
- 1899 Henry Greenway Howse, A Review of Surgery during the past 100 Years
- 1898 Thomas Pickering Pick, The Union of Wounds
- 1897 Alfred Willett, The Correction of Certain Deformities by Operative Measures upon Bones
- 1896 Reginald Harrison, Vesical Stone and Prostatic Disorders
- 1895 Nottidge Charles MacNamara, Osteitis
- 1894 Sir Oliver Pemberton, James Syme, Regius Professor of Surgery in the University of Edinburgh 1833-1869: A Study of His influence and Authority on the, Art and Science of Surgery during that Period
- 1893 Sir William MacCormac, Sir Astley Cooper and his Surgical Work
- 1892 Christopher Heath, The Surgery of the Nose and Accessory Cavities
- 1891 John Whittaker Hulke, On Fractures and Dislocations of the Vertebral Column
- 1890 Sir Thomas Spencer Wells, Modern Abdominal Surgery
- 1889 Thomas Bryant, Colostomy: Lumbar and Iliac
- 1888 Sir Jonathan Hutchinson, Museums in their Relation to Medical Education and the Progress of Knowledge
- 1886 Henry Power, Bacteriology and its Relations to Surgery
- 1885 John Wood, Antiseptics in Surgery
- 1884 William Scovell Savory, The Pathology of Cancer
- 1883 John Marshall, Nerve Stretching for the Relief or Cure of Pain
- 1882 Sir James Paget - Some New and Rare Diseases (Inaugural lecture)

== See also ==
- Fitzpatrick Lecture
- Goulstonian Lecture
- Harveian Oration
- Lumleian Lectures
- Milroy Lectures
