= Ernest Septimus Reynolds =

Ernest Septimus Reynolds FRCP
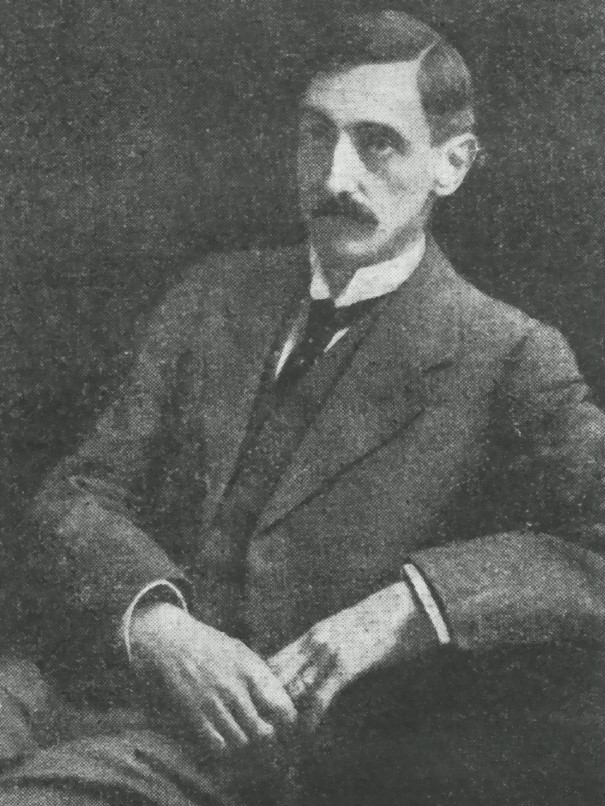
- Born: 7 April 1861; Manchester, England
- Died: 22 May 1926 (aged 65)
- Occupation: Physician
- Known for: Discovering arsenic in beer in 1900
- Spouse: Rosa Maud

Ernest Septimus Reynolds FRCP (7 April 1861 – 22 May 1926) was emeritus professor of clinical medicine at the University of Manchester. In 1900 he wrote "An Epidemic of Peripheral Neuritis Amongst Beer Drinkers in Manchester and District" for the British Medical Journal, the first of a series of papers which caused a national sensation when they revealed the presence of dangerous levels of arsenic in local beer.

== Early life and family ==
Reynolds was born in Manchester on 7 April 1861, the son of J.H. Reynolds. He received his early education at the Manchester Commercial Schools and Owens College, and subsequently completed the Victoria BSc prior to entering medicine. He won the Platt physiological exhibition and qualified from the University of London in 1883.

He was married to Rosa Maud, daughter of Thomas Hooker, and they had one daughter.

== Medical career ==
After qualifying, Reynolds took up posts at the Macclesfield County Asylum, the Cheadle Royal Asylum, the West Riding Asylum and the Manchester Royal Infirmary where he became resident medical officer (1887–1891). He was admitted a member of the Royal College of Physicians in 1888 and became a fellow in 1896. In 1891, he became honorary physician at the Ancoats Hospital and physician to the Manchester Workhouse Infirmary, a position he held for some time. In 1892 he became lecturer in hygiene at the Lancashire County Council. During the First World War, Reynolds served as a lieutenant-colonel in the Royal Army Medical Corps. He was professor of clinical medicine (part-time) at the university from 1913 to 1921; he retired from the university as emeritus professor.

Reynolds is best known for being the first to identify dangerous levels of arsenic in beer brewed in the Manchester area, which he revealed in a 1900 paper for the British Medical Journal titled "An Epidemic of Peripheral Neuritis Amongst Beer Drinkers in Manchester and District", the first of a series of papers on the subject. The discovery caused a national sensation. The conclusion did not come easily, and there were many confounding factors. In 1901, he co-authored along with Ronald Ross, an article demonstrating a similarity between beriberi and alcoholic neuritis, and "it seemed that some of the beriberi cases might also be due to arsenic poisoning". This led to widespread discussion among tropical disease experts as to whether the neuropathies seen were due to beriberi.

Described as private and even externally cool, Reynolds could be passionate about causes in which he believed strongly. Among these were the need for physicians not to rely too much on technology at the expense of close observation of the patient at the bedside when making a diagnosis, and the National Insurance Act 1911 to which he was vehemently opposed and against which he spoke at a public rally.

In October 1920, Reynolds gave his presidential lecture for the section of neurology of the Royal Society of Medicine on the causes of nervous diseases, using the same classification he had proposed in his Bradshaw Lecture of 1917.

== Death and legacy ==
Reynolds died on 22 May 1926 from "acute influenzal pneumonia". He received an obituary of over two pages in the British Medical Journal and is profiled in Munk's Roll. He left an estate of £30,183 with probate being granted to his widow, his solicitor, and Archibald Donald, consulting surgeon at the MRI.

== Selected publications ==
- A Primer of Hygiene. Macmillan, London, 1894.
- Hygiene for Beginners. Macmillan, London, 1896.
- "An Epidemic of Peripheral Neuritis Amongst Beer Drinkers in Manchester and District", British Medical Journal, 24 November 1900, pp. 1492–1493.
- "The Epidemic of Peripheral Neuritis traced to arsenical contamination of beer-making materials", British Medical Journal, 1 December 1900, pp. 1587–1594.
- "Further observations on epidemic arsenical peripheral neuritis", British Medical Journal, 22 December 1900, pp. 1769–1771.
- "Bradshaw Lecture on the Causes of Disease", The Lancet, Vol. 190, No. 4915 (10 November 1917), pp. 703–709.
- "Causes of Nervous Diseases", The Lancet, 23 October 1920.

== See also ==
- 1900 English beer poisoning
