= Herbert Duthie =

British academic surgeon

Sir Herbert Duthie KBE FRCSE FRCS
- Born: 9 October 1929; Glasgow, Scotland
- Died: 24 April 2015 (aged 85); Cheltenham, England
- Education: University of Glasgow
- Occupation: Academic surgeon
- Known for: Presidency Association of Surgeons of Great Britain and Ireland
- Medical career
- Institutions: Sheffield University; Welsh National School of Medicine
- Research: Gastrointestinal motility and gastric secretion

Sir Herbert Livingston Duthie KBE, LLD, FRCS, FRCSEd (9 October 1929 – 24 April 2015) was a British academic surgeon, widely known as Bert Duthie. His early research focussed on gastric acid output, large bowel motility and the pathophysiology of the anal sphincter. As professor of surgery in the University of Sheffield he became involved in large scale trials of the management of peptic ulcer disease. The latter part of his career was in an administrative role as Provost of the University of Wales College of Medicine in Cardiff and as a member of the General Medical Council.

== Early life ==
Born in Glasgow, the eldest of three children of Herbert William Duthie and Margaret McFarlane Duthie (née Livingston), Duthie went to school at Whitehill Secondary School, Glasgow during World War II. He was awarded a bursary to study medicine at the University of Glasgow qualifying MB ChB with honours in 1952. As an undergraduate he played football for the university team and for Scottish Universities team.

== Career ==
After residency posts he was called up for National Service and was promoted captain in the Royal Army Medical Corps serving in Egypt from 1954 to 1956. Having decided on a career in surgery he obtained the fellowships of the Royal College of Surgeons of Edinburgh winning the gold medal as the best candidate in the examination. He went on to take the fellowship of the Royal College of Surgeons of England. After surgical training posts at the Western Infirmary, Glasgow he took the degree of ChM in 1959. He was awarded a scholarship for surgical research at the Mayo Clinic in Rochester, Minnesota, returning to a lecturer post in Glasgow in 1960. Here he worked under Professor Sir Charles Illingworth, joining the academic departmental programme of research into gastrointestinal physiology, studying in particular gastric acid secretion and large bowel motility. He was appointed senior lecturer then reader in surgery at the University of Leeds with Professor John Goligher and was awarded the degree of MD in 1962. He became professor of surgery at the University of Sheffield in 1964. Here he continued to develop research into surgery for peptic ulcer disease, large bowel motility, internal and external anal sphincter physiology and colorectal surgery. In 1979 he left clinical practice for an administrative post with his appointment as Provost of the University of Wales College of Medicine in Cardiff (subsequently the Cardiff University School of Medicine). He was appointed a member of the General Medical Council serving as Chairman of its Professional Conduct Committee.

== Honours and awards ==
He was knighted (KBE) in 1987 and elected president of the Society of Academic and Research Surgery, and later president of the Association of Surgeons of Great Britain and Ireland. The Sir Herbert Duthie Library at Cardiff University was named for him. In 1990 he was awarded the honorary degree of Doctor of Laws (LLD) by the University of Sheffield.

== Later life and death ==
After retiring in 1994 he moved to Cheltenham, England where he died in 2015.

== Selected bibliography ==
Stoddard, C., Smallwood, R., & Duthie, H. (1981). Electrical arrhythmias in the human stomach. Gut, 22, 705 - 712.

Taylor, I., Duthie, H., Smallwood, R., Linkens, D. (1975). Large bowel myoelectrical activity in man. Gut, 16, 808 - 814.

Taylor, I., & Duthie, H. (1976). Bran tablets and diverticular disease. British Medical Journal, 1, 988 - 990.
