= 1900 English beer poisoning =

Food safety crisis

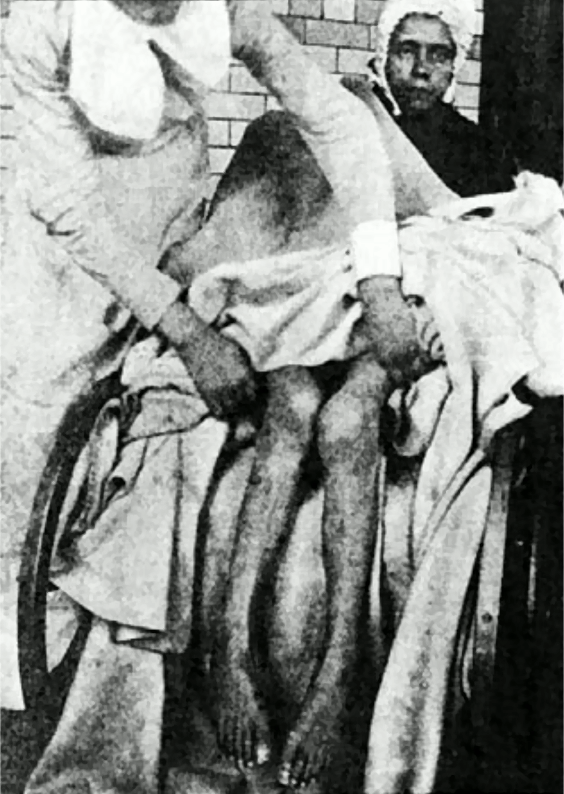
A victim of the epidemic exhibiting complete paralysis of lower limbs with atrophy

In 1900, more than 6,000 people in England were poisoned by arsenic-tainted beer, with more than 70 of the affected dying as a result. The food safety crisis was caused by arsenic entering the supply chain through impure sugar which had been made with contaminated sulphuric acid. The illness was prevalent across the Midlands and North West England, with Manchester being the most heavily affected.

Originally misdiagnosed as alcoholic neuropathy, the main epidemic was only recognised after several months. Additionally, investigation into the outbreak found other sources of arsenic in beer, which had been unknowingly poisoning thousands in decades preceding the outbreak.

== Misdiagnosis and investigation ==
This mass poisoning is unusual in that it was not noticed for four months. The doctors, seeing patients who were usually heavy drinkers and who showed muscle weakness and numbness of the hands or feet, initially thought that the patients had "alcoholic neuritis". Nevertheless, a marked increase in the number of cases was noted, with 41 people succumbing to peripheral neuritis, multiple neuritis or alcoholic neuritis and 66 people perishing from alcoholism in the four months of the outbreak, while the previous seven months revealed only 22.

These cases of neuritis were eventually connected to cases of skin discolouration previously thought to be unrelated. Ernest Reynolds, the doctor responsible for making the connection, also noted that only one substance would cause these symptoms: arsenic. He also noted that heavy drinkers who drank mainly spirits seemed less affected than beer drinkers. He gathered samples for analysis from the taverns frequented by his patients, which confirmed the presence of arsenic in the beer they consumed.

== Source of the poisoning ==
Once the breweries affected were identified, investigation as to where the arsenic came from were instituted. It was found that the arsenic was present in invert sugar provided to the breweries by Bostock & Co. of Garston. To lower costs in the tight-margin English beer market, some breweries substituted high-quality barley malt with low-quality barley malt supplemented with sugar. This practice was somewhat controversial; as part of the Pure Beer movement, an inquiry on the use of brewing substitutes had been called. This inquiry, starting in 1896 and ending in 1899, had concluded that brewing substitutes were not "deleterious materials" under the Sale of Food and Drugs Act 1875 (38 & 39 Vict. c. 63) and that further legislation was not required.

This sugar was made by acid hydrolysis of starch, where starch is heated in the presence of an acid to form glucose. Such a method was not new, and had been employed commercially since at least 1814. Bostock & Co. used sulphuric acid to perform the acid hydrolysis. This acid, purchased from Nicholson & Sons, was made from pyrites which contained arsenic, which remained in the final product.

John Nicholson & Sons, of Leeds, had provided sulphuric acid to Bostock & Co. since 1888. For most of the length of the business relationship, the acid provided was free from arsenic. However, in March 1900, Nicholson started supplying unpurified sulphuric acid containing arsenic. This practice continued until November 1900, when the acid was found to be the cause of the outbreak. Nicholson claimed that they did not know the nature of Bostock's use of the acid, and that they could have provided arsenic-free acid if requested.

=== Alternative sources of arsenic in beer ===
Once the main source of the outbreak had been identified as arsenic poisoning, further investigation into arsenic contamination of beer was undertaken. Eventually, it was found that arsenic was also introduced into beer by the malted barley. In the kilning stage of malting, the barley humidity content is reduced by drying the grain with the hot vapours of a fire, usually fuelled by coke or coal. It was found that when arsenic is present in the fuel, it could then be deposited upon the barley before steeping, and therefore would be present in the final product. Investigation into the outbreak uncovered that most cases of alcoholic neuropathy endemic to Manchester were, in fact, misdiagnosed arsenic poisoning, with this alternative route being responsible for the poisoning of thousands in the years preceding the outbreak.

==== Halifax 1902 beer poisoning ====
Such contamination was tied to an outbreak in the borough of Halifax in January and February 1902 where 13 to 14 cases of arsenic poisoning were noted, three deadly. The malt was dried over a non-sequestered gas coke fire, thus resulting in contaminated beer.

== Reaction ==
After the cause of the poisoning was reported by the media, a considerable reduction in beer consumption was noted in the region.

The response from the brewing industry was mixed. There was a strong, immediate reaction from some breweries, led by the large Manchester brewery Groves and Whitnall, who went as far as sending out telegrams to all the taverns and inns that had purchased their beer. Breweries disposed of thousands of barrels of beer by dumping them in the city's sewers. Other breweries were slower to respond, with fines being handed out to breweries whose beer samples could still be purchased by investigators. Additionally, one pub was fined for selling contaminated beer after they were notified of the presence of arsenic by the manufacturer.

In Lancashire, 23 taverns and pubs were prosecuted for violations under section 6 of the Sale of Food and Drugs Act 1875.

Bostock & Co. went into liquidation, and sued Nicholson & Sons for damages, for breach of an implied condition under the Sale of Goods Act 1893. The case was heard by Mr Justice Bruce in the High Court: the judge awarded Bostock the price of the contaminated acid and the value of their spoiled products, but no special damages for the loss of goodwill or for the damages claimed by the brewers, incurred by using the contaminated product in their sugar's manufacture. Nicholson & Sons survived, and was later acquired by B. Laporte, now Laporte plc.

The poisoning resulted in the appointment of a Royal Commission led by Lord Kelvin, which submitted a preliminary report in 1901 and a final report in 1903.

== Long-term effects ==
The effects on the beer market were short-lived, and consumption of beer resumed over the course of the year. Attempts to revive the pure beer movement were nullified by the commission's report, and by the fact that arsenic was present in malted barley as well as sugar. There seemed to be no direct effects on legislation resulting from the incident.

In 1901, a considerable decline in the birth rate was noted in Manchester, Salford and Liverpool. This decline was greater in areas most affected, leading the Royal Commission to conclude that the epidemic was the cause.

A 2026 study found, "the arsenic-in-beer epidemic caused a 10% drop in births in 1901, but the effect was short-lived. After about 28 weeks, birth rates returned to pre-epidemic levels."

== See also ==
- Morinaga Milk arsenic poisoning incident occurred in 1955 in Japan by dried milk contaminated with arsenic.
