= James William Brown =

- Born: 28 January 1897; Gloucester
- Died: 10 September 1958 (aged 61); Mount Vernon Hospital, Northwood, London
- Occupation: cardiologist
- Known for: Congenital Heart Disease (1939); 2nd edition (1950)

James William Brown FRCP (1897–1958) was an English physician, pathologist, and cardiologist.

As a Quaker educated at the Society of Friends School at Sidcot, he served with a Friends Ambulance Unit in France from 1916 to 1919, and was awarded the Croix de Guerre in 1917 for evacuating six wounded soldiers under heavy fire.

After demobilisation he entered the Middlesex Hospital Medical School and qualified MRCS, LRCP in 1923. He graduated MB BS (Lond.) in 1924 and MD (Lond.) in 1928. In 1924 he joined the general practice of Joshua Williamson (b. 1874), who was a general practitioner and also held an appointment as honorary surgeon to Grimsby Hospital. At the Grimsby Hospital, Brown became honorary pathologist and then honorary physician. He qualified MRCP in 1930 and was elected FRCP in 1942. He was a general practitioner, in partnership with Williamson (who became his father-in-law), at Cleethorpes from 1924 to 1931 and at Grimsby from 1931 to 1938. In 1938 he abandoned general practice to become a consultant physician, and later cardiologist, to the Grimsby Hospital and the Scunthorpe General Hospital.

In 1930, he joined David Clark Muir in running a paediatric heart clinic at Hull. The clinic developed into a referral centre for congenital heart disease. Brown wrote with Evan Bedford the section on congenital heart disease in volume 6 of the British Encyclopaedia of Medical Practice (1937, London, Butterworth & Co., Ltd.). Brown's book Congenital Heart Disease (1939) was of some importance in the development of cardiac surgery. In 1943 he gave the Bradshaw Lecture. He was a member of the editorial board of the British Heart Journal.

In Grimsby in 1925 Brown married Margaret J. Williamson. They had a son and a daughter.

== Selected publications ==
- with D. C. Muir: Muir, D. C.; Brown, J. W. (December 1932). "Patent ductus arteriosus". Arch Dis Child. 7 (42): 291–302. doi:10.1136/adc.7.42.291. PMC 1975247. PMID 21031901.
- with D. C. Muir: Muir, D. C.; Brown, J. W. (February 1934). "Patent interventricular septum (maladie de Roger)". Arch Dis Child. 9 (49): 27–38. doi:10.1136/adc.9.49.27. PMC 1975306. PMID 21031943.
- with D. C. Muir: Muir, D. C.; Brown, J. W. (11 May 1935). "Congenital heart disease". Br Med J. 1 (3879): 966–971. doi:10.1136/bmj.1.3879.966. PMC 2460118. PMID 20779073.
- with Frank Hampson: Brown, J. W.; Hampson, F. (July 1944). "Temporal arteritis". Br Heart J. 6 (3): 154–156. doi:10.1136/hrt.6.3.154. PMC 480972. PMID 18609971.
- with William Whitaker and Donald Heath: Whitaker, W.; Heath, D.; Brown, J. W. (April 1955). "Patent ductus arteriosus with pulmonary hypertension". Br Heart J. 17 (2): 121–137. doi:10.1136/hrt.17.2.121. PMC 479536. PMID 14363529.
- with Donald Heath and William Whitaker: Brown, J. W.; Heath, D.; Whitaker, W. (July 1955). "Eisenmenger's complex". Br Heart J. 17 (3): 273–284. doi:10.1136/hrt.17.3.273. PMC 479556. PMID 13239921.
- with Donald Heath and William Whitaker: Heath, D.; Brown, J. W.; Whitaker, W. (January 1956). "Muscular defects in the ventricular septum". Br Heart J. 18 (1): 1–7. doi:10.1136/hrt.18.1.1. PMC 503934. PMID 13284178.
- with Donald Heath, Thomas L. Morris, and William Whitaker: Brown, J. W.; Heath, D.; Morris, T. L.; Whitaker, W. (October 1956). "Tricuspid atresia". Br Heart J. 18 (4): 499–518. doi:10.1136/hrt.18.4.499. PMC 503979. PMID 13374157.
- with Donald Heath and William Whitaker: Heath, D.; Whitaker, W.; Brown, J. W. (January 1957). "Idiopathic pulmonary hypertension". Br Heart J. 19 (1): 83–92. doi:10.1136/hrt.19.1.83. PMC 503366. PMID 13396081.
