= William Errington Hume =

British physician and cardiologist

Sir William Errington Hume CMG FRCP (14 July 1879, Newcastle-on-Tyne – 1 January 1960) was a British physician and cardiologist.

== Biography ==
After education at Repton, William Errington Hume matriculated in October 1897 at Pembroke College, Cambridge, and graduated there BA in 1900. After medical education at the London Hospital, he graduated MB BChir and MA in 1904 and MD in 1913 from the University of Cambridge.

At the London Hospital, he clerked for Sir Bertrand Dawson. At the Royal Victoria Infirmary, after holding junior appointments from 1904 to 1907, at age 28 he was appointed assistant physician. Six months later, he was promoted to full physician.

He held this post until 1939 when he retired as consulting physician. He qualified MRCP in 1909.

Though essentially a general physician his special interest was in cardiology; he was a master of the Mackenzie ink-polygraph and published one of the early papers on auricular flutter (Quart. J. Med.,1912–13, 6, pp. 235–40), and others on the heart in diphtheria.

In WWI, Hume served from 1914 to 1919 in the RAMC, attaining the rank of colonel. He was elected FRCP in 1917. He was mentioned twice in despatches and in 1919 was made a Companion of the Order of St Michael and St George.

In the First World War he became, though still in his thirties, consulting physician to the 1st Army in France; in this post he did notable work on poison gas, on the so-called D.A.H. or effort syndrome, and on spirochaetal jaundice.

On 21 February 1922, Hume wrote to John Cowan (1870–1947) with a suggestion for those physicians who had been attending meetings to give advice on heart disease to the Ministry of Pensions. Hume suggested that those physicians should be called together at the next meeting of the Association of Physicians of Great Britain and Ireland. The cardiologists' meeting, chaired by Alexander George Gibson (1875–1950), formed the Cardiac Club on 22 April 1922.

In 1937 the Cardiac Club became the Cardiac Society of Great Britain and Ireland. The Society was renamed again in 1946 as the British Cardiac Society. They took a new name in 2006 as the British Cardiovascular Society.

Under the auspices of the Royal College of Physicians, Hume in 1930 gave the Bradshaw Lecture on Paroxysmal tachycardia. In 1943 he gave the Harveian Oration on The Physician in War—in Harvey's Time and After. He held the chair of medicine of Durham University for several years before WWII.

After retiring in 1939 from the Honorary Staff of the Royal Victoria Infirmary, Hume became a cardiologist at the Newcastle General Hospital and helped to initiate a Regional Cardiovascular Department there. From 1950 onward he suffered increasingly from arthritis. He was knighted in 1952.

== Family ==
George Haliburton Hume (1845–1923), surgeon to the Newcastle Infirmary, was William Errington Hume's father. His mother was Frances Diana Jackson of Canada West (daughter of Minchin Jackson an Irish farmer and Frances Errington of the gentry High Warden branch). William Hume's younger brother was killed in WWI.

In 1918, William Hume married Marie Élisabeth Tisseyre, eldest daughter of a colonel in the French Army. The couple (a Protestant husband and a French Catholic mother) had two sons and three daughters, who were raised as Catholic. Their elder son George Haliburton Hume became a priest and later advanced to Basil Cardinal Hume, English Roman Catholic bishop, later Cardinal. Their younger son, John Hume, became a medical doctor in Sunderland. Their eldest daughter, Madeleine Frances Hume, married Sir John Charles, a doctor.

== Selected publications ==
- Hume, W. E. (10 June 1911). "The interpretation and significance of some irregularities of the pulse". Br Med J. 1 (2632): 1368–1371. doi:10.1136/bmj.1.2632.1368. PMC 2333681. PMID 20765672.
- "General oedema following gastroenteritis in children". Br Med J. 2 (2644): 478–481. 2 September 1911. doi:10.1136/bmj.2.2644.473. PMC 2330921.
- with S. J. Clegg: "A Clinical and Pathological Study of the Heart in Diphtheria". Quart. J. Med. 8: 1–18, with Plates 1 & 2. 1914.
- with Bertrand Dawson and S. P. Bedson: Dawson, B.; Hume, W. E.; Bedson, S. P. (15 September 1917). "Infective jaundice". Br Med J. 2 (2959): 345–354. doi:10.1136/bmj.2.2959.345. PMC 2349141. PMID 20768732.
- "A study of the cardiac disabilities of soldiers in France: (VDH and DAH)". The Lancet. 191 (4937): 529–534. 1918. doi:10.1016/s0140-6736(01)26039-5.
- with Paul Szekely: Hume, W. E.; Szekely, P. (July 1944). "Cardiac involvement in spirochætal jaundice". Br Heart J. 6 (3): 135–138. doi:10.1136/hrt.6.3.135. PMC 480969. PMID 18609968.
