= Celia Mary Oakley =

British cardiologist

- Born: 14 May 1931
- Died: 17 November 2014 (aged 83)
- Scientific career
- Fields: Cardiology

Celia Mary Oakley MRCS FRCP FESC (14 May 1931 – 17 November 2014) was a British cardiologist. She was one of the founding fellows of the European Society of Cardiology. Oakley was a recipient of the Laennec Master Clinician award and the Mackenzie medal.

== Biography ==
Celia Oakley‘s MD thesis was dedicated to the pulmonary blood volume in humans, during preparation of which she developed an interest in pulmonary hypertension, valvular heart disease and congenital heart disease.

Oakley served as house physician and house surgeon at the Royal Free Hospital and house physician to the Paul Wood cardiac unit at the Royal Brompton Hospital. She was a member of the team who coined the term "hypertrophic obstructive cardiomyopathy" and Professor of Clinical Cardiology at Hammersmith Hospital. In 1958 there were only three female cardiologists in the UK including Oakley. In 1991, Celia Oakley was appointed as a personal chair at the Hammersmith Hospital, London.

In 1950, Celia Oakley married Ron Pridie, who was a pioneer in echocardiography and worked at Harefield Hospital, London. They had two daughters and four grandchildren. She died 17 November 2014.

== Awards and honours ==
- Bradshaw Lecture, 1983.
- Laennec Master Clinician award from the American Heart Association, 2004.
- Mackenzie medal of the British Cardiovascular Society for services to British cardiology, 2006.
