= Kenneth William Donald =

British expert on underwater and exercise physiology

Professor Kenneth William Donald OBE DSC FRCP FRCPE
- Born: 25 November 1911
- Died: 17 July 1994 (aged 82)
- Occupations: Physician and professor of medicine
- Known for: Pioneering use (in 1953) of cardiac catheterization in the study of exercise physiology

Kenneth William Donald (25 November 1911 – 17 July 1994) was a British physician, surgeon, pulmonologist, cardiologist, professor of medicine, and leading expert on underwater physiology and exercise physiology.

== Biography ==
After education at Emmanuel College, Cambridge and St Bartholomew's Hospital, he qualified MRCS, LRCP in 1936 and graduated MB BChir (Cantab.) in 1938. After house appointments, he joined the Royal Navy in 1939. He was Surgeon Lieutenant aboard HMS Hotspur during the first naval Battle of Narvik in April 1940. He was awarded the DSC in June 1940.

In 1942 he was transferred to work on underwater physiology, an event which was to shape much of his subsequent career. Naval divers had only recently begun to use pure oxygen and suffered from oxygen poisoning, the cause and mechanism of which was little understood. In the Admiralty diving unit, which he helped to establish, research was conducted which led to safe diving procedures, using oxygen-nitrogen mixtures under controlled conditions. This allowed the crews of midget submarines and especially divers involved in the clearance of mines in captured ports to carry out their hazardous work.

Donald graduated MD in 1945. From 1946 to 1948 he worked at St Bartholomew's Hospital as chief assistant to Ronald Christie and worked with Christie's research group on the physiology of chronic lung disease. From 1948 to 1949 Donald was a Rockefeller fellow at Manhattan's Bellevue Hospital, where he worked with the Nobel prize winner André Cournand. Donald also collaborated there with Richard L. Riley (1911–2001) on research involving "ventilation-perfusion relationships and gas diffusion at the alveolo-capillary membrane of the lungs." After returning to England, Donald was from 1949 to 1950 a senior lecturer at the Royal Brompton Hospital. From 1950 to 1959 he was reader in medicine at the University of Birmingham Medical School. At Birmingham he did research on pulmonary circulation, with a team including John Bishop, Gordon Cumming (1922–2001), Archie C. Pincock, and Owen Lyndon Wade (1921–2008).

A striking finding was that in rheumatic heart disease the cardiac output did not increase much with exercise and sometimes not at all, although this could be reversed after successful valvotomy.

From 1959 to 1976 Donald held the chair of medicine at the University of Edinburgh. His predecessor was Sir Stanley Davidson. Donald was dean of the faculty of medicine for three years.

He gave the Bradshaw Lecture in 1958. He was elected FRCP in 1952 and FRCPE in 1960. In 1959 he was elected a member of the Harveian Society of Edinburgh and served as President in 1971. He was from 1967 to 1976 physician to the Queen in Scotland and was from 1976 to 1977 president of the Association of Physicians of Great Britain and Ireland.

He retired in 1976. Upon his death he was survived by his widow.

== Selected publications ==
- Donald, K. W. (17 May 1947). "Oxygen Poisoning in Man. Part I". Br Med J. 1 (4506): 667–672. doi:10.1136/bmj.1.4506.667. PMC 2053251. PMID 20248086.
- Donald, K. W. (24 May 1947). "Oxygen Poisoning in Man. Part II". Br Med J. 1 (4507): 712–717. doi:10.1136/bmj.1.4507.712. PMC 2053400. PMID 20248096.
- with W. M. Davidson and W. O. Shelford: Donald, K. W.; Davidson, W. M.; Shelford, W. O. (July 1948). "Submarine escape breathing air". J Hyg (Lond). 46 (2): 176–183. doi:10.1017/S0022172400036275. PMC 2235099. PMID 18882231.
- with J. M. Bishop, S. H. Taylor, and P. N. Wormald: Bishop, J. M.; Donald, K. W.; Taylor, S. H.; Wormald, P. N. (1957). "The blood flow in the human arm during supine leg exercise". The Journal of Physiology. 137 (2): 294–308. doi:10.1113/jphysiol.1957.sp005813. PMC 1362980. PMID 13449879.
- with Lindsay A. G. Davidson and Cecil T. G. Flear: Davidson, L. A.; Flear, C. T.; Donald, K. W. (26 March 1960). "Transient Amino-aciduria in Severe Potassium Depletion". Br Med J. 1 (5177): 911–913. doi:10.1136/bmj.1.5177.911. PMC 1967413. PMID 13814350.
- Donald, K. W. (March 1971). "The contribution of clinical academic departments to the advancement of medicine". Proc R Soc Med. 64 (3): 303–311. doi:10.1177/003591577106400334. PMC 1811537. PMID 5551490.
- with A. Armstrong, Barbara Duncan, Michael Francis Oliver, Desmond Gareth Julian, Mary Fulton, W. Lutz, and S. L. Morrison: Armstrong, A.; Duncan, B.; Oliver, M. F.; Julian, D. G.; Donald, K. W.; Fulton, M.; Lutz, W.; Morrison, S. L. (January 1972). "Natural history of acute coronary heart attacks. A community study". Br Heart J. 34 (1): 67–80. doi:10.1136/hrt.34.1.67. PMC 487092. PMID 5059657.
