= John Wood (surgeon) =

British surgeon (1825–1891)

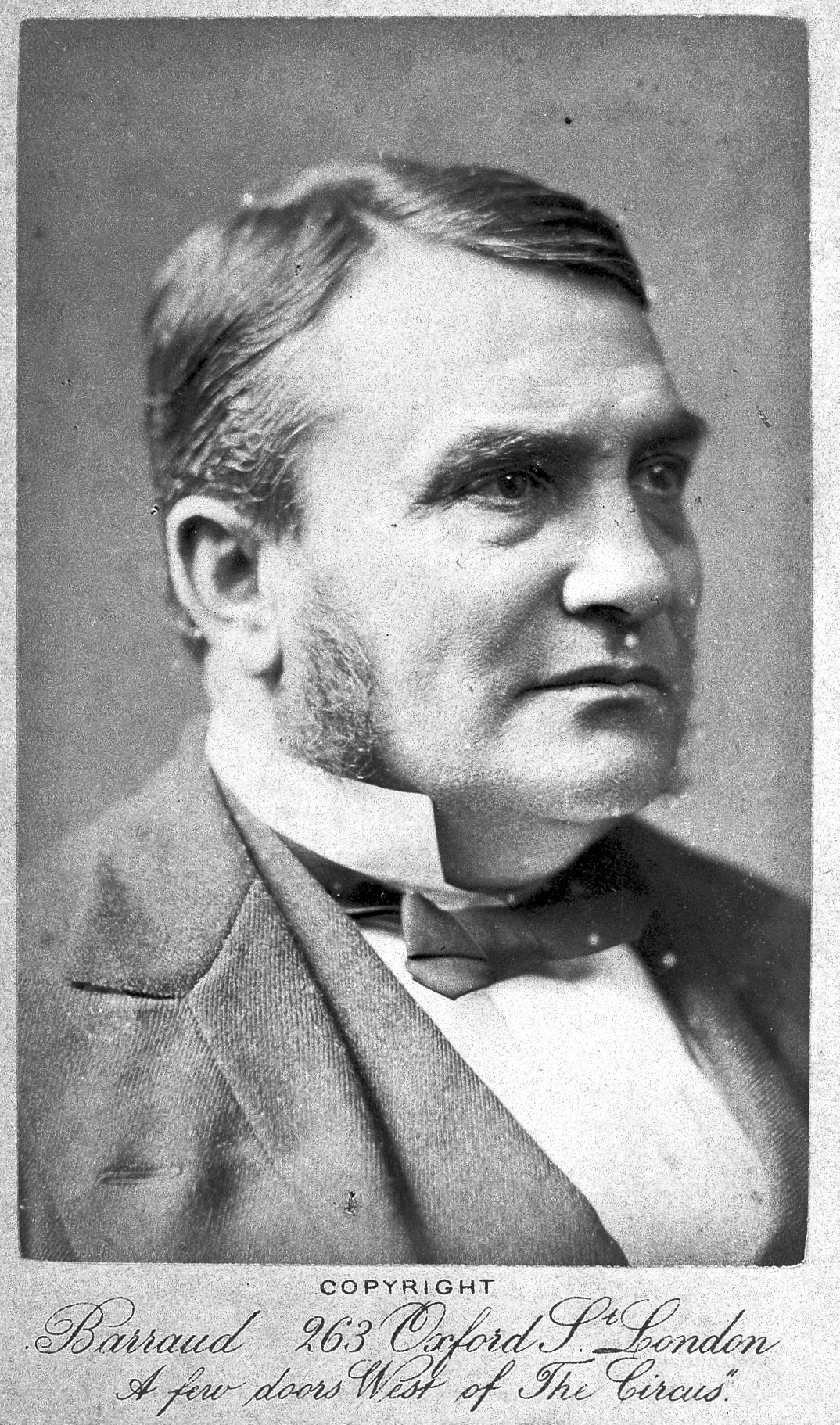
- Born: 12 October 1825; United Kingdom
- Died: 29 December 1891 (aged 66); Kensal Green, London, England
- Occupation: Surgeon
- Known for: Involvement in a variety of crimes

John Wood, FRCS, FRS (12 October 1825 – 29 December 1891) was a British surgeon at King's College Hospital. He was an expert on hernias, and an early investigator of the antiseptic practices pioneered by Joseph Lister, the topic of his 1885 Bradshaw Lecture.

Wood held many important positions at the Royal College of Surgeons of England. Elected a fellow after examination on 11 May 1854, he was Jacksonian prizeman in 1861; examiner in anatomy and physiology 1875–1880; examiner in surgery 1879–89, and in dental surgery 1883–88; a member of the council 1879–87, and vice-president 1885; Hunterian professor 1884–5, and Bradshaw lecturer in 1885. He was elected a fellow of the Royal Society in June 1871, and in the same year he became an honorary fellow of King's College, London. At various times he acted as an examiner in the universities of London and of Cambridge. He was president of the Metropolitan Counties' branch of the British Medical Association, and he was an honorary fellow of the Swedish Medical Society. He died on 29 Dec. 1891, and is buried in Kensal Green cemetery.
