= Alexander D. Blackader =

Canadian-American pediatrician

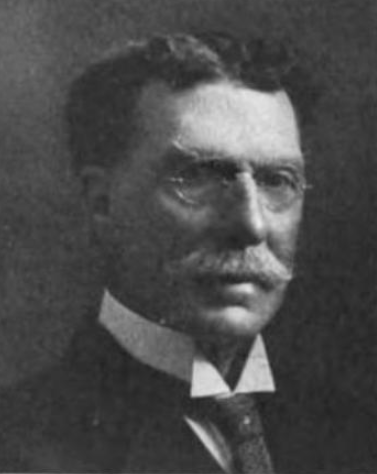
- Born: Alexander Dougall Blackader; June 19, 1847; Montreal, Canada East
- Died: March 14, 1932 (aged 84); Montreal, Quebec
- Education: McGill University; St Thomas' Hospital
- Occupation: Pediatrician

Alexander Dougall Blackader (June 19, 1847 – March 14, 1932) was a Canadian-American pediatrician.

== Biography ==
Alexander D. Blackader was born in Montreal on June 19, 1847. He earned first-class honors at McGill University and studied at St Thomas' Hospital in London.

He was the president of the American Pediatric Society for 1892–93. He gave the 1929 Bradshaw Lecture.

He died in Montreal on March 14, 1932.
