= Max Page =

British Army general

Major-General Sir Max Page KBE CB DSO
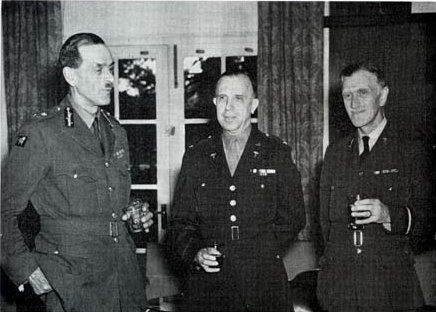
- Page (left) with Colonel Oramel H. Stanley and Air Commodore Geoffrey Keynes in the Second World War
- Born: 2 September 1882
- Died: 1 August 1963 (aged 80)
- Military career
- Allegiance: United Kingdom
- Branch: British Army
- Service years: 1910–1944
- Rank: Major-General
- Conflicts: First World War; Second World War
- Awards: Knight Commander of the Order of the British Empire; Companion of the Order of the Bath; Distinguished Service Order; Mentioned in Despatches (3); Officer of the Legion of Honour (France)

Major-General Sir Charles Max Page, KBE, CB, DSO (2 September 1882 – 1 August 1963) was a British surgeon and British Army officer. He was president of the Association of Surgeons of Great Britain and Ireland in 1946.

Page was commissioned lieutenant in the Royal Army Medical Corps Special Reserve in 1910. He reached the rank of lieutenant-colonel in the First World War and was awarded the Distinguished Service Order in 1918. By 1943 he had reached the rank of major-general and was appointed a Knight Commander of the Order of the British Empire in 1945 for his services during the Second World War.

In 1945 Page delivered the Bradshaw Lecture to the Royal College of Surgeons on the subject of fracture treatment.
