= James Barr (physician) =

Irish physician (1849–1938)

Sir James Barr CBE KStJ DL FRCP FRSE
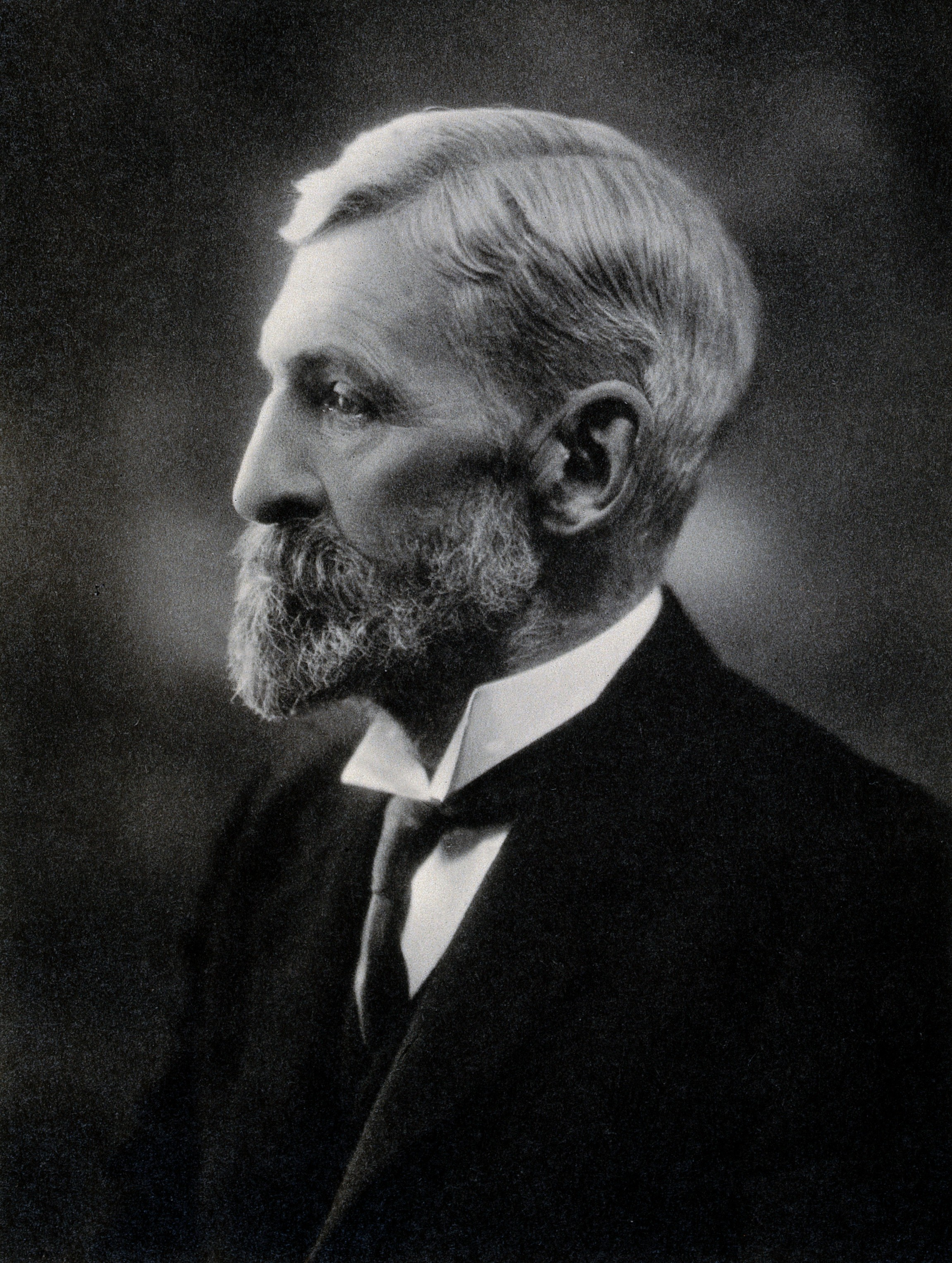

Personal details
- Born: 25 September 1849 Cumber, County Tyrone, Ireland
- Died: 16 November 1938 (aged 89) Putney Heath, London, England
- Occupation: Physician

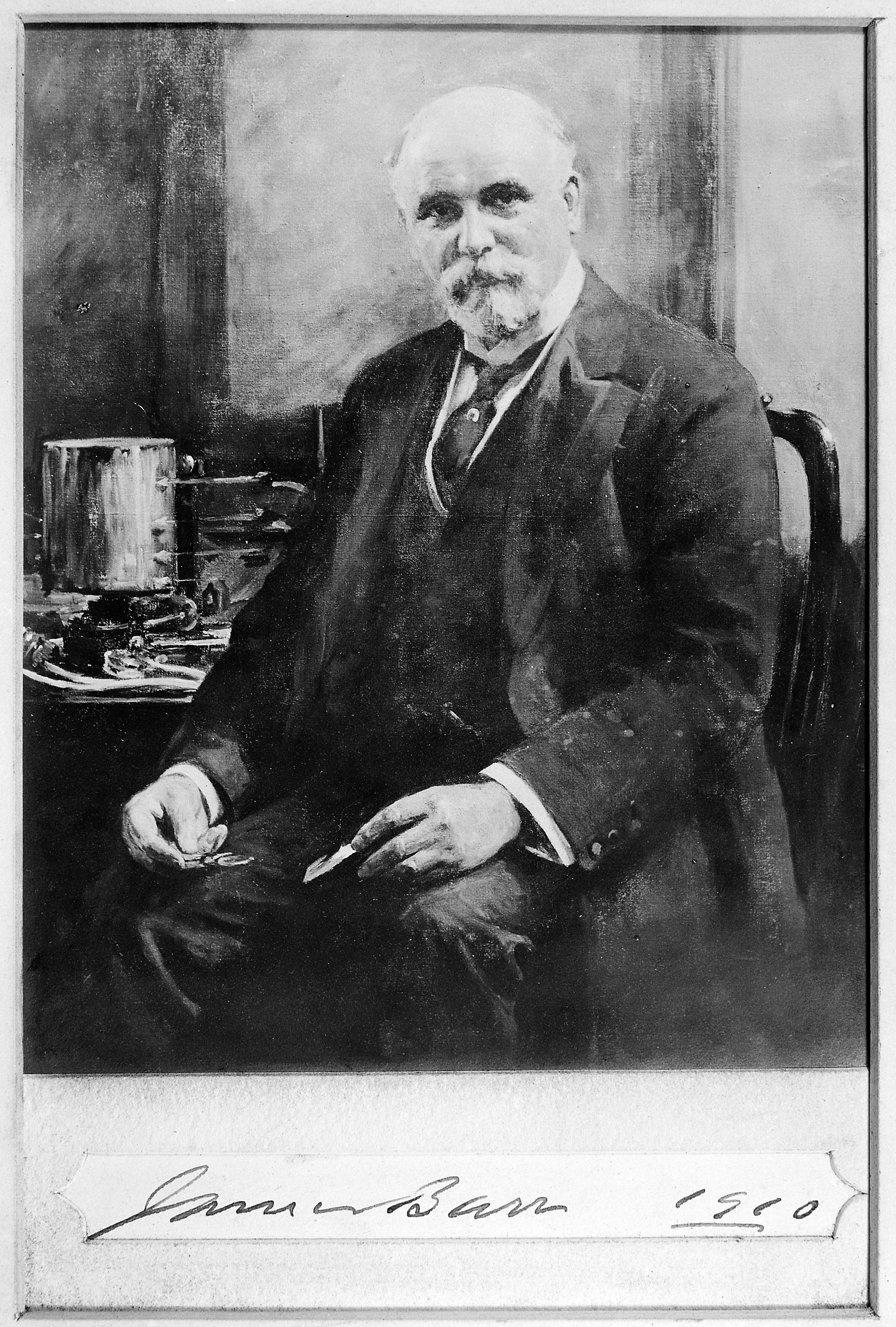
Sir James Barr

Sir James Barr (25 September 1849 – 16 November 1938) was an Ulster-born physician, who rose to be President of the British Medical Association and is noted for his work on the medical care of prisoners.

== Life ==
He was born in Cumber, County Tyrone, Ireland, the son of Samuel Barr J.P. He was schooled in Derry.

He then came to Scotland to study medicine at Glasgow University, graduating in 1873.

He received house appointments in Glasgow Royal Infirmary and then the Northern Hospital, Liverpool, settling in Everton at that time.

Working at Kirkdale Gaol in Liverpool as a Medical Officer he developed a strong interest in the care of prisoners, leading him to be sent to Ireland by the British Government in 1885 during a period of unrest. His promotion of the medical examination of political prisoners in Ireland sparked controversy.

He gave evidence to the Capital Sentences Committee (sitting 1886-1888) and in 1891 was involved in the training of the first three hangmen who were put on the list of persons competent to perform executions.

He was knighted in 1905, a Knight of the Grace of the Order of St John of Jerusalem, and appointed a CBE in 1920.

In 1907 he gave the Bradshaw Lecture. In 1912 he was elected President of the British Medical Association.

Sir James was an enthusiastic supporter of eugenics. In his Presidential Address to the British Medical Association in 1912, he argued that "The race must be renewed from the mentally and physically fit, the moral and physical degenerates should not be allowed to take any part in adding to the race." In a 1918 speech, Barr said that tuberculosis "forms a rough, but on the whole very serviceable check, on the survival and propagation of the unfit" before concluding: "...if to-morrow the tubercle bacillus were non-existent, it would be nothing short of a national calamity. We are not yet ready for its disappearance."

He was Vice President of the Society of Constructive Birth Control and Racial Progress and a strong supporter of its founder Marie Stopes.

He retired to London in 1926 and died at Putney Heath.

== Publications ==
- Judicial Hanging (1884)
- Post Sacrlatinal Nephritis (1887)
- Pleural Effusion and its Treatment (1907)

== Family ==
He married Isabelle Woolley in 1882. They had one son, Samuel Tudor Barr, and one daughter.
