= John Guyett Scadding =

John Guyett Scadding (30 August 1907 – 10 November 1999) was a British physician.

He was born in north London, the son of John William and Jessima Alice (née Guyett) Scadding.

He was appointed physician at the Brompton Hospital, London from 1939 to 1972 and at the Royal Postgraduate Medical School, Hammersmith Hospital, from 1946 to 1972. He was also Dean of the Institute of Diseases of the Chest at London University from 1946 to 1960, their Director of Studies from 1950 to 1962 and Professor of Medicine (Emeritus) from 1962 to 1972. In 1946 he became a founder member of a Medical Research Council Committee set up to study the treatment of tuberculosis by newly discovered drugs. He was best known for his seminal work on sarcoidosis and his studies in fibrosing alveolitis.

During the Second World War, he served as Lieutenant-Colonel in charge of a medical division in Egypt, and assisted with the treatment of Winston Churchill for pneumonia at U.S. General Dwight D. Eisenhower's villa in Carthage.

He was Editor of Thorax from 1946 to 1959 and delivered the Bradshaw Lecture at the Royal College of Physicians in 1949 on sarcoidosis. President of the British Tuberculosis Association, 1959–61 and President of the Thoracic Society, 1971-72 he was a major influence in the 1982 merger of the two societies (by which time the British Tuberculosis Society had evolved into the British Thoracic Association) as the British Thoracic Society.

He died at Beaconsfield in 1999. He had married Mabel Pennington and had one son and two daughters.
