= William Walton Gooddy =

English neurologist

- Born: 19 January 1916; Boscombe
- Died: 17 November 2004 (aged 88); Surrey
- Occupation: Neurologist
- Known for: Time and the nervous system (1988)

William Walton Gooddy FRCP (1916–2004) was an English neurologist.

== Biography ==
After education at Winchester College and a nine-month tour of Germany, William Gooddy studied medicine at University College London. There he met his wife-to-be, Edda, who was a medical student in the same graduating class. He qualified MRCS, LRCP in 1941. After qualifying, Gooddy and his wife became RAMC officers. He became house physician to the medical unit at University College Hospital and graduated MB BS (Lond.) in 1942. At University College Hospital, he was influenced by Francis Walshe. During WWII Gooddy was first a regimental medical officer and was then stationed until 1945 at St Hugh's Military Hospital for head injuries. During his army training he was among the first physicians to prescribe penicillin. In 1946 he graduated MD (Lond.). Later he was put in charge of the medical division of the British Military Hospital, Berlin.

In 1948, Gooddy was appointed physician to the neurological department of University College Hospital and assistant physician to the National Hospital for Neurology and Neurosurgery in Queen Square, London. He was elected FRCP in 1953. He wrote a foreword for Oliver Sacks's 1970 book Migraine. Gooddy delivered in 1976 the Bradshaw Lecture on Time and the nervous system: the neuron as an escapement.

Later in his career he became interested in the role of trace elements in the causation of neurological disease, delivering the 8th Gowers Memorial Lecture on chemical elements, neurology, and abiotrophy.

Upon his death in 2004 he was survived by his widow, a son, a daughter and three grandchildren.

== Selected publications ==
=== Articles ===
- Gooddy, W. (7 November 1953). "Lumbar Puncture". Br Med J. 2 (4844): 1040–1042, 1043. doi:10.1136/bmj.2.4844.1040. PMC 2029981. PMID 13094113.
- Gooddy, William (1957). "On the nature of pain". Brain. 80 (1): 118–131. doi:10.1093/brain/80.1.118. PMID 13412998.
- Gooddy, William (March 1963). "Delayed Development of Speech with Special Reference to Dyslexia". Proc R Soc Med. 56 (3): 206–209. doi:10.1177/003591576305600325. PMC 1897334. PMID 13949066.
- Gooddy, William (March 1964). "Some Aspects of the Life of Dr C E Brown-Séquard". Proc R Soc Med. 57 (3): 189–192. doi:10.1177/003591576405700318. PMC 1897869. PMID 14130870.
- with A. D. Dayan, M. J. G. Harrison, and Peter Rudge: Dayan, A. D.; Gooddy, W.; Harrison, M. J.; Rudge, P. (18 November 1972). "Brain stem encephalitis caused by Herpesvirus hominis". Br Med J. 4 (5837): 405–406. doi:10.1136/bmj.4.5837.405. PMC 1786642. PMID 4344352.
- with D. L. McAuley and D. A. Isenberg: McAuley, D. L.; Isenberg, D. A.; Gooddy, W. (May 1978). "Neurological involvement in the epidermal naevus syndrome". J Neurol Neurosurg Psychiatry. 41 (5): 466–469. doi:10.1136/jnnp.41.5.466. PMC 493057. PMID 660212.
- Gooddy, W. (3 March 1979). "Brain failure in private and public life". Br Med J. 1 (6163): 591–593. doi:10.1136/bmj.1.6163.591. PMC 1598394. PMID 427457.
- with W. M. Edmondstone, D. K. Price, and T. H. Shepherd: Edmondstone, W. M.; Price, D. K.; Shepherd, T. H.; Gooddy, W. W. (April 1982). "Mixed connective tissue disease presenting as trigeminal neuropathy". Postgrad Med J. 58 (678): 237–238. doi:10.1136/pgmj.58.678.237. PMC 2426403. PMID 7111106.
- Gooddy, William (March 1970). "Admiral Lord Nelson's neurological illnesses". Proc R Soc Med. 63 (3): 299–306. doi:10.1177/003591577006300341. PMC 1811341. PMID 4910860.
- M. Baraitser, A. M. Halliday, A. E. Harding, P. Rudge, and F. Scaravilli: Baraitser, M.; Gooddy, W.; Halliday, A. M.; Harding, A. E.; Rudge, P.; Scaravilli, F. (January 1984). "Autosomal dominant late onset cerebellar ataxia with myoclonus, peripheral neuropathy and sensorineural deafness: a clinicopathological report". J Neurol Neurosurg Psychiatry. 47 (1): 21–25. doi:10.1136/jnnp.47.1.21. PMC 1027636. PMID 6319613.
- Gooddy, W. (March 1994). "Brain failure in private and public life: a review". J Neurol Neurosurg Psychiatry. 57 (3): 377–380. doi:10.1136/jnnp.57.3.377. PMC 1072835. PMID 8158192.

=== Books ===
- Time and the nervous system. New York; London: Praeger. 1988; 178 pp.
- Neurological Cosmology: The World, the Brain and I. London; Miami: Minerva Press. 2000.
