= Thomas Robinson Glynn =

British physician and professor

Thomas Robinson Glynn FRCP (23 January 1841, Liverpool – 12 May 1931, Tremeirchion, Denbighshire, Wales) was a British physician, pathologist, and professor of medicine at University College Liverpool (which became in 1903 the University of Liverpool).

== Education and career ==
After education at Liverpool College, he studied medicine at St Bartholomew's Hospital and in Paris. He graduated from the University of London with MB BS in 1865 and higher MD in 1879.

After his MB qualification, he obtained appointments as assistant physician to the Royal Liverpool Children's Hospital (located on Myrtle Street, Liverpool), physician to the David Lewis Northern Hospital, and demonstrator of anatomy at the University of Liverpool School of Medicine. At the Liverpool Royal Infirmary he became in 1871 a full physician, an appointment he held until retiring as consulting physician in 1901.

Dr. Glynn was lecturer in medicine at the Royal Infirmary School of Medicine—one of the band of distinguished teachers (Mitchell Banks, Richard Caton, Alexander Davidson, William Carter, Rushton Parker) that gained for the school a high reputation. They played a large part in the foundation of University College in 1881, Glynn becoming the first professor of medicine (1884–1922).

Glynn was elected FRCP in 1882. Under the auspices of the Royal College of Physicians he gave in 1903 the Lumleian Lectures on infective endocarditis and in 1913 the Bradshaw Lecture on hysteria.

During holidays, he worked on sketching and painting with Robert Fowler and achieved almost a professional standard. Some of Glynn's paintings were publicly exhibited.

His teaching was largely based on his knowledge of pathology, and at the Medical Institution and in his class-rooms his expositions were frequently illustrated by excellent water-colour paintings of specimens of fresh preparations, and also of clinical conditions.

== Family ==
Edward Dashpen Glynn (1801–1874), a Liverpool shipowner, was Thomas Glynn's father. On 11 April 1872 at St Mary's Church, Wimbledon, Thomas Glynn married Octavia de Paiva, who died in 1882. On 12 March 1885 in Liverpool, he married Alice Lewtas Griffin (b. 1855). There were children from both marriages. Thomas Glynn was the father of five sons and four daughters. One of his sons was Ernest Edward Glynn, F.R.C.P.

== Selected publications ==
- "The Lumleian Lectures On infective endocarditis mainly in its clinical aspects. Lecture I". The Lancet. 161 (4154): 1007–1010. 11 April 1903. doi:10.1016/s0140-6736(00)67034-4.
- "The Lumleian Lectures On infective endocarditis mainly in its clinical aspects. Lecture II". The Lancet. 161 (4155): 1073–1077. 18 April 1903. doi:10.1016/s0140-6736(01)71890-9.
- "The Lumleian Lectures On infective endocarditis mainly in its clinical aspects. Lecture III". The Lancet. 161 (4156): 1148–1153. 25 April 1903. doi:10.1016/s0140-6736(00)67107-6.
- Glynn, Thomasr (1910). "The traumatic neuroses". The Lancet. 176 (4549): 1332–1336. doi:10.1016/s0140-6736(00)52735-4.
