= John Goligher =

British surgeon

John Cedric Goligher (1912–1998) was a British surgeon who specialised in diseases of the rectum and colon and in coloproctology. He was "renowned worldwide" and had "a national and international reputation" He is considered to have been "one of the preeminent clinical investigative surgeons" of his time.

== Early life ==
John Cedric Goligher was born on 13 March 1912 in Derry, Ireland. He was educated at Foyle College. (Note: Goligher was President of the Foyle College Old Boys' Association for the academic year 1978-9.) He went on to study medicine at the University of Edinburgh where he qualified with the MB ChB degree in 1934.

== Career ==
Goligher studied at the University of Edinburgh where he attained postgraduate qualifications as a surgeon (MRCS) in 1938, and attained his professional fellowship qualifications the same year (FRCS and FRCSEd). He attained his Master of Surgery qualification nine years later in 1947 (ChM). His career began at the Royal Infirmary of Edinburgh. During World War II he worked first at St Mark's Hospital and then for five years (from 1941) in the Royal Army Medical Corps. After the war, he worked at St Mary's Hospital in London. He left London in 1955 to take up a post as Professor of Surgery at the University of Leeds and Director of the Professorial Surgical Unit at Leeds General Infirmary. He worked at Leeds until his retirement in 1978.

== Professional bodies and societies ==
Goligher was a member of the following professional bodies:

- Royal College of Surgeons of England
- Royal Society of Medicine
- Association of Surgeons of Great Britain and Ireland
- British Society of Gastroenterology

== Fellowships and memberships ==
Goligher was a member or fellow of numerous British and foreign medical societies and organisations:

- American College of Surgeons
- American Society of Colon and Rectal Surgeons
- Royal Australasian College of Surgeons
- Brazilian College of Surgeons

== Lectures ==
Goligher was in great demand as a lecturer, giving over 20 named lectures during his lifetime. (Note: An example of such a lecture is: Goligher, J. C.; Visceral and parietal sutures in abdominal surgery. Guest Oration. 16th Annual Meeting, Society for Surgery of the Alimentary Tract, San Antonio, Texas, 1975.)

== Later life ==
Goligher retired to Wetherby in West Yorkshire where he established a successful private practice. He died aged 85 on 18 January 1998.

== Honours and awards ==
Goligher's honours and awards include the following:

- 1955 Olof af Acrel medal of the Swedish Surgical Society
- 1978 Bradshaw Lecture - Recent Trends in the Treatment of Carcinoma of the Rectum (delivered 6 November 1978)
- 1980 Honorary Doctor of Science (DSc) of the University of Leeds
- 1981 Lister Medal - The Skeptical Chirurgeon (delivered 6 April 1983) (Note: Goligher's award was made "for his original and distinguished contributions to clinical surgery, which have been influential throughout the field of gastrointestinal surgery but especially in the treatment of colorectal carcinoma and ulcerative colitis".)

Goliger also received honorary doctorates from: Queen's University Belfast, the University of Gothenburg, the University of the Republic (Uruguay), and the University of Hull.

== Legacy ==
The John Goligher Colorectal Surgery Unit at Leeds Hospital is named after Goligher. Memorial medals and lectures have been named for him. The Goligher retractor is named for him.

== Works ==
- Surgery of the Anus, Rectum and Colon (1961), second edition in 2000
- Ulcerative Colitis (1968)
