= Clifford Wilson (nephrologist) =

British nephrologist

- Born: 27 January 1906; Halifax, Yorkshire
- Died: 10 November 1997 (aged 91); Southampton
- Known for: Kimmelstiel-Wilson syndrome synonym: Kimmelstiel-Wilson disease; Kimmelstiel-Wilson nodule synonym: Kimmelstiel-Wilson lesion

Clifford Wilson FRCP (1906–1997) was a British nephrologist and professor of medicine.

== Biography ==
After education at Heath Grammar School in Halifax, Clifford Wilson studied at Balliol College, Oxford, graduating with a first in natural sciences. He then studied medicine at the London Hospital. He qualified MRCS, LRCP in 1931. He graduated BM BCh Oxon in 1933. In 1934, by means of a Rockefeller travelling scholarship, he went to Harvard Medical School, where he worked with the pathologist Paul Kimmelstiel.

In parallel to albuminuria in 1936, discussion on renal lesions observed in patients with diabetes led to the description, by Kimmelstiel and Wilson, of the characteristic nodular fibrotic observed in the diabetic glomeruli (Kimmelstiel and Wilson, 1936b). Kimmelstiel and Wilson introduced the term diabetic nephropathy (DN) to define a clinical syndrome of arterial hypertension, overt proteinuria (or macroalbuminuria), and worsening kidney function (Kimmelstiel and Wilson, 1936a).

Wilson returned to the London Hospital. He graduated DM in 1936. In 1938 he became assistant director of the London Hospital's academic medical unit with Arthur Ellis as the director.

During WWII Wilson served in the RAMC's medical research section and helped to deal with outbreaks of viral hepatitis in the military. In 1946 he succeeded Arthur Ellis as professor of medicine at the University of London. Wilson, with Michael Floyer, Jack Ledingham, and the pathologist Frank Byrom, worked with rats to show how a vicious circle of hypertension can develop — renal damage can cause hypertension, which in turn can cause arteriolar lesions with increased renal damage.

Wilson was elected FRCP in 1951. He was professor of medicine at the University of London (at the London Hospital) from 1946 to 1971, when he retired as professor emeritus. There he was dean of the faculty of medicine from 1968 to 1971 and director of the academic medical unit from 1946 to 1971. He was president of the Renal Association in 1963–1964. In 1967 he gave the Bradshaw Lecture on The cause and prognosis of the nephrotic syndrome.

In 1936 Clifford Wilson married Kathleen Hebden. They had a son and a daughter.

== Selected publications ==
- with Ensor Roslyn Holiday: Wilson, Clifford; Holiday, Ensor Roslyn (1933). "A rapid method for obtaining protein-free ultrafiltrates of blood and plasma". Biochem J. 27 (4): 1095–1098. doi:10.1042/bj0271095. PMC 1252992. PMID 16745194.
- with Paul Kimmelstiel: Kimmelstiel, P.; Wilson, C. (January 1936). "Benign and Malignant Hypertension and Nephrosclerosis: A Clinical and Pathological Study". Am J Pathol. 12 (1): 45–82.3. PMC 1911030. PMID 19970253.
- with Paul Kimmelstiel: Kimmelstiel, P.; Wilson, C. (January 1936). "Intercapillary lesions in the glomeruli of the kidney". The American Journal of Pathology. 12 (1): 83–98.7. PMC 1911022. PMID 19970254.
- with Myron Prinzmetal: Prinzmetal, Myron; Wilson, Clifford (January 1936). "The nature of the peripheral resistance in arterial hypertension with special reference to the vasomotor system". J Clin Invest. 15 (1): 63–83. doi:10.1172/JCI100759. PMC 424761. PMID 16694381.
- with M. R. Pollock and A. D. Harris: Wilson, C.; Pollock, M. R.; Harris, A. D. (24 March 1945). "Therapeutic Trial of Methionine in Infective Hepatitis". Br Med J. 1 (4394): 399–401. doi:10.1136/bmj.1.4394.399. PMC 2057065. PMID 20785970.
- Ayre, P. (1 December 1945). "Acute Yellow Atrophy after Trilene". Br Med J. 2 (4430): 784. doi:10.1136/bmj.2.4430.784-d. PMC 2060377.
- Wilson, C. (18 September 1948). "Streptomycin in Non-tuberculous Infections". Br Med J. 2 (4576): 552–553. doi:10.1136/bmj.2.4576.552. PMC 2091673. PMID 18882983.
- Wilson, Clifford (August 1952). "Clinical Assessment of the Newer Antibiotics". Postgrad Med J. 28 (322): 437–441. doi:10.1136/pgmj.28.322.437. PMC 2530627. PMID 14957665.
- Wilson, Clifford (April 1955). "Experiment and Therapy in Hypertension". Proc R Soc Med. 48 (4): 279–286. doi:10.1177/003591575504800405. PMC 1918766. PMID 14371591.
- with J. M. Ledingham: Wilson, C.; Ledingham, J. M. (24 November 1956). "Irradiation-induced Malignant Hypertension". Br Med J. 2 (5003): 1236–1237. doi:10.1136/bmj.2.5003.1236-a. PMC 2035831.
- WILSON C (31 October 1964). "Recent Advances in Hypertension". Can Med Assoc J. 91 (18): 964–970. PMC 1927767. PMID 14217261.
