= Robert Frederick Mahler =

British physician (1924–2006)

- Born: Robert Friedrich Mahler; 31 October 1924; Vienna
- Died: 29 May 2006 (aged 81); London
- Occupations: Physician and professor of medicine
- Known for: Research on McArdle's syndrome

Robert Frederick Mahler FRCP FRCPE (1924–2006) was a British physician, diabetologist, medical researcher, professor of medicine, and medical journal editor.

Robert Mahler's father was a surgeon in Vienna until 1938 when the family became refugees. Robert Mahler and his younger brother escaped via the Kindertransport to Edinburgh, where the two brothers were placed with the family of Ebenezer James MacRae. The brothers' parents escaped to India, where the younger brother, but not Robert, joined them. His parents spent the duration of WWII in India.

Robert Mahler attended the Edinburgh Academy for two years and then matriculated at age 16 at the University of Edinburgh, where he studied biochemistry and medicine. He graduated in 1946 BSc at the University of Edinburgh and in 1947 MB ChB (Edin.) at the University of Edinburgh Medical School. He was then appointed house physician to Hammersmith Hospital, where he worked under Graham Bull on electrolyte metabolism and prototype dialysis machines. In 1949 Mahler qualified MRCP. He then did two years of National Service in the RAF, where he became a medical specialist with the rank of squadron leader.

From 1951 to 1956 he was supported by a fellowship; he worked first at the MRC's Pneumoconiosis Research Unit in Wales, then at the Radiation Sickness Research Unit in London, and finally at the University of Manchester's Department of Medicine under the nephrologists Sydney William "Bill" Stanbury and Oliver Wrong. Mahler was appointed in 1956 lecturer in therapeutics at the University of St Andrews Medical School. He spent the two years 1957 and 1958 on an fellowship at Harvard Medical School. There he taught and did research on the effects of insulin on hepatic glucose metabolism and on elucidating the enzymatic defect in McArdle's disease.

From 1959 to 1966 he was Reader in Experimental Medicine at Guy's Hospital, taking a year out to be visiting professor at Indiana University. From 1966 until 1970 he was Professor of Metabolic Medicine at the Welsh National School of Medicine in Cardiff, and then Professor of Medicine until 1979. He spent the rest of his clinical career at Northwick Park Hospital in Harrow.

From 1959 to 1965 Mahler published a series of papers that established his scientific reputation. In 1968 he was elected FRCP and FRCP Edin. In 1975 he spent a sabbatical year at the Karolinska Institute. In 1977 he gave the Bradshaw Lecture. He was editor of the Journal of the Royal College of Physicians of London from 1987 to 1994. He retired from medical practice in 1990.

His grand uncle was Gustav Mahler and Robert's great interest was music and opera.

== Marriage and family ==
Mahler married in 1951. Upon his death in 2004, he was survived by his widow, two sons, and four grandchildren.
