= Seymour Sharkey =

British medical doctor

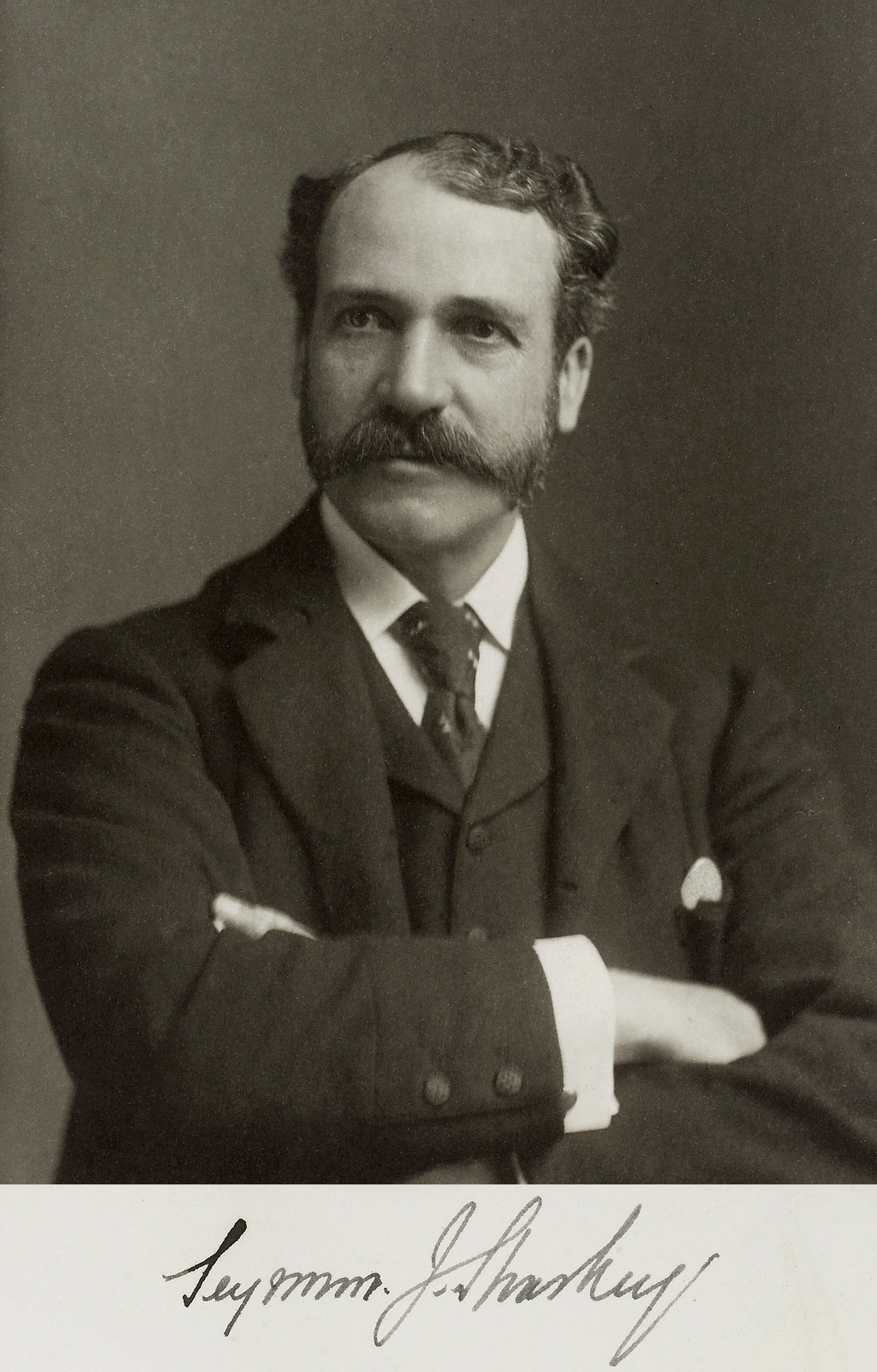

Sir Seymour John Sharkey (10 July 1847 – 6 September 1929) was a physician at St Thomas' Hospital, London.

== Life ==
Sharkey was born at Saint Peter, Jersey, the third son of Edmund Sharkey, M.D., and educated at Christ's Hospital. He won an open classical scholarship to Jesus College, Oxford, matriculating in 1866 and obtaining a first-class honours degree in natural science in 1870. He later obtained the degrees of MB (1875) and MD (1888). He won the Radcliffe Travelling Fellowship in 1873 and spent three years studying medicine in Berlin, Vienna and Paris before completing his medical training at St Thomas' Hospital, rising in 1890 to the position of full physician, remaining as consultant physician after his retirement in 1910.

He became a Fellow of the Royal College of Physicians in 1885 and delivered their Goulstonian lecture in 1886 on nerve disease and their Bradshaw Lecture in 1906 on rectal alimentation.

His interest in diseases of the nervous system led to him becoming President of the Neurological Society of the United Kingdom in 1904. He was knighted in 1914 and became an Honorary Fellow of Jesus College in 1918.

He died in 1929 and was buried at Kensal Green Cemetery.
