= Nottidge Charles MacNamara =

British surgeon (1833–1918)

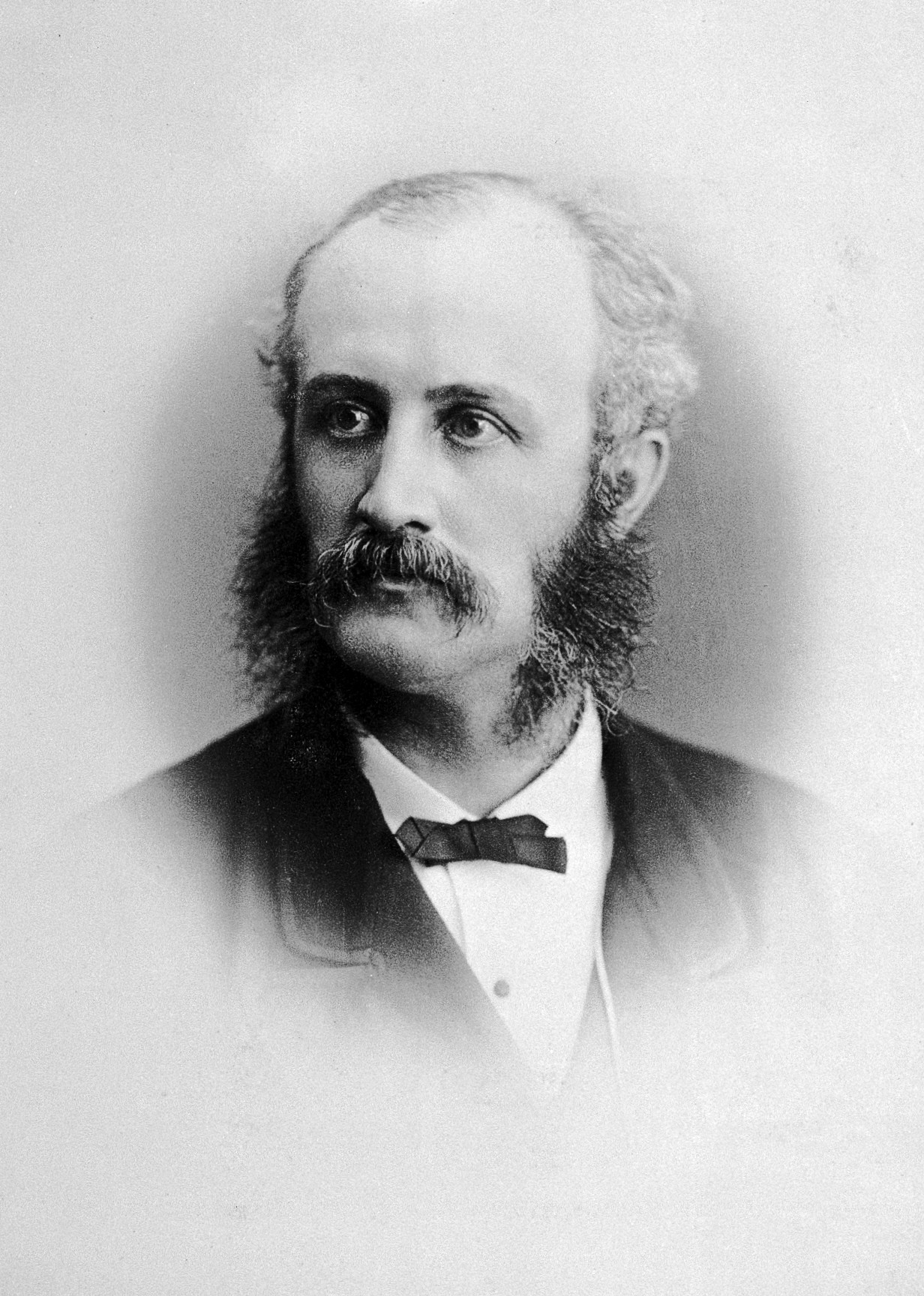

Nottidge Charles MacNamara FRCS FRCSI (1833 – 1918) was a British surgeon in the Indian Medical Service and later a consulting ophthalmic surgeon in London.

== Career ==
Nottidge MacNamara was born in Uxbridge, Middlesex to Daniel MacNamara MRCS RN (1791-1851) and Frances née Fennell (1802-1875). He studied at King's College Hospital and, on 4 November 1854, after qualifying MRCS, joined the Bengal Army as an Assistant Surgeon; becoming Surgeon on 4 November 1866, Surgeon Major on 1 July 1873, he became FCRS, England in 1875 and retired from the army on 15 April 1876. He served in the Sonthal campaign of 1855–56, and held the chair of Ophthalmic Surgery in Calcutta from December 1863, till his retirement.

After his retirement he was Surgeon and Lecturer on Clinical Surgery at the Westminster Hospital, and Consulting Surgeon at the Westminster Ophthalmic Hospital, becoming FCRSI in 1887. He was a member of the Council of the Royal College of Surgeons, England, from 1885 to 1901, Vice President in 1893 and 1896. He also served as Vice-President of the British Medical Association; a member of the War Office Committee of the Army Medical Service, and the Government Committee on Leprosy; and as Chairman of the Committee of British Medical Associations on Medical education and of Teaching University for London.

== Family ==
His father Daniel MacNamara was a RN Surgeon married Frances Fennel 13 August 1823, in Marylebone Parish. The MacNamara pedigree is registered with the College of Arms in Dublin and London. Nottidge Charles MacNamara was the 6th son in a family of thirteen Children. His brother Francis Nottidge M.D became a Surgeon General and was Professor of Chemistry at the Medical College, Calcutta.

== Family Crest ==
A naked arm holding in the hand a Scimitar all Ppr(proper).

== Works ==
- MacNamara, Nottidge Charles (1870). A Treatise on Asiatic Cholera. London: J. Churchill and sons.
- MacNamara, Nottidge Charles (1871). Report on cholera in Calcutta. Calcutta, India: Frederick Lewis, Calcutta Central Press Co.
- MacNamara, Nottidge Charles (1874). An account of the origin and construction of the Mayo Native Hospital. Calcutta, India: Calcutta General Press Company, Limited.
- MacNamara, Nottidge Charles (1876). A manual of the diseases of the eye. Calcutta, India: Frederick Lewis, Calcutta Central Press Co.
- MacNamara, Nottidge Charles (1896). The story of an Irish sept : their character & struggle to maintain their lands in Clare. London, England: J.M. Dent.
- MacNamara, Nottidge Charles (1900). Origin and character of the British people. Philadelphia, USA: Lindsay and Blakiston.
- MacNamara, Nottidge Charles (1908). Human Speech: a study in the purposive action of living matter. Gerrard Street, London: Kegan Paul, Trench, Trübner & Co.
- MacNamara, Nottidge Charles (1915). Instinct and intelligence. London: H. Frowde.

== See also ==
- Rao, C. Hayavadana (ed.). "Macnamara, Nottidge Charles" . The Indian Biographical Dictionary . Madras: Pillar & Co. pp. 258–259.
- Memorials of The Danvers Family
