= Association of Surgeons of Great Britain and Ireland =

The Association of Surgeons of Great Britain and Ireland is a British medical association founded in 1920 with the twin aims of the advancement of the science and art of surgery and the promotion of friendship amongst surgeons. Berkeley Moynihan was a driving force behind the association's creation.

== Presidents ==
Past presidents of the association include:

- Baron Ribeiro
- Sir Hedley Atkins
- Sir Geoffrey Jefferson
- Sir James Learmonth
- Sir Hugh Cairns
- Sir Max Page
- Sir Claude Frankau
- Sir David Wilkie
- Baron Moynihan
- Sir John Bland-Sutton
- Robin C. N. Williamson
- Sir Herbert Duthie
- Professor Rowan Parks
