= William Thorburn =

British surgeon (1861–1923)

Sir William Thorburn KBE, CB, CMG, FRCS, DL
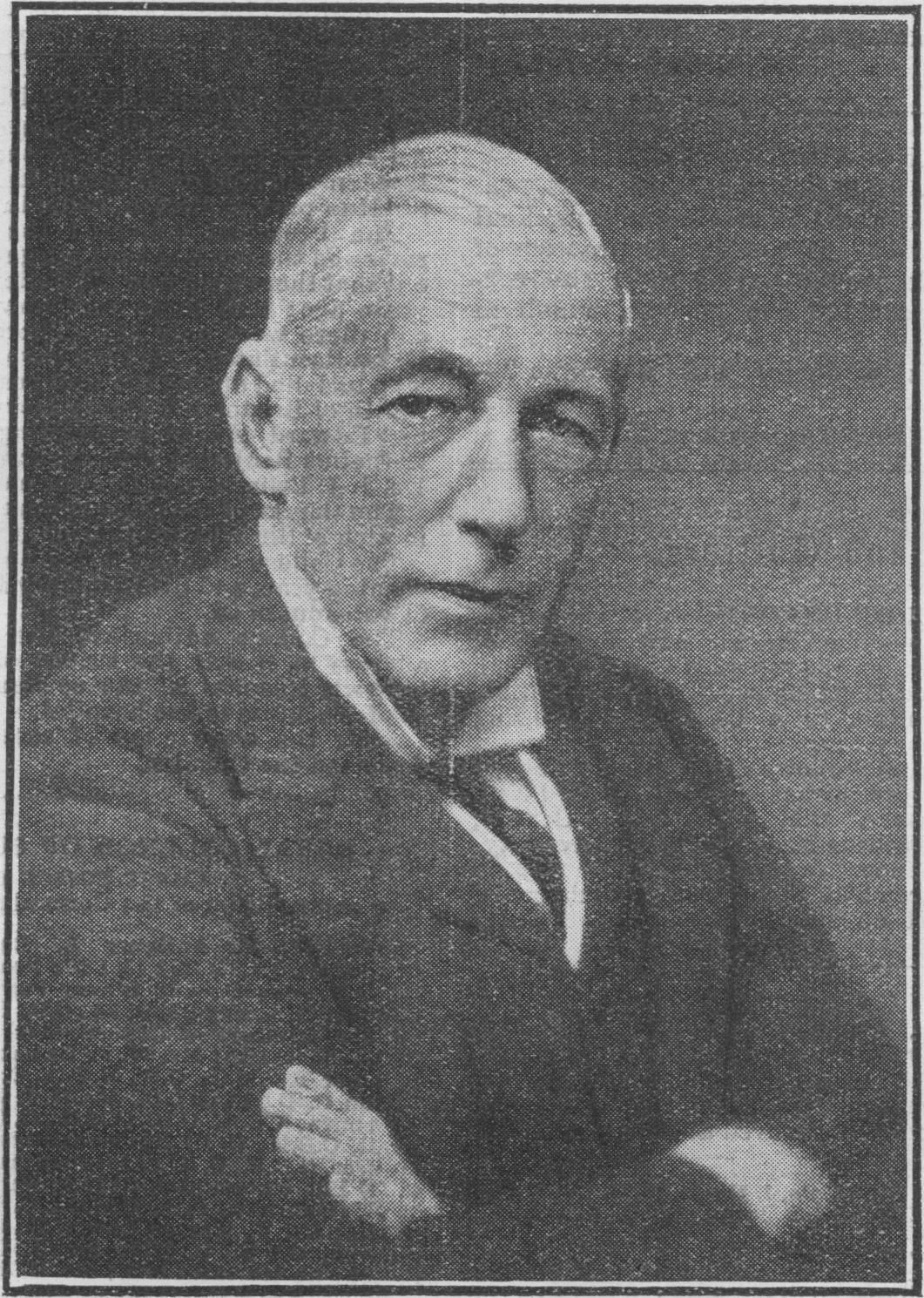
- Born: 7 April 1861; Manchester, England
- Died: 18 March 1923 (aged 61); York Gate, Regent's Park, London, England
- Resting place: Manchester Southern Cemetery
- Education: B.Sc., M.D. (University of London)
- Alma mater: Manchester Royal Infirmary, University of London
- Occupation: Surgeon
- Employer: Victoria University of Manchester
- Known for: Pioneer in modern spinal surgery
- Spouse: Augusta Melland
- Children: Three daughters
- Parent: Dr. John Thorburn
- Awards: Order of the British Empire, Order of the Bath, Order of St. Michael and St. George

Sir William Thorburn KBE, CB, CMG, FRCS DL (7 April 1861 – 18 March 1923) was an English surgeon and pioneer in modern spinal surgery. At the time of his death he was Emeritus Professor of Clinical Surgery at the Victoria University of Manchester.

== Life ==
He was the son of Dr. John Thorburn, Professor of Obstetric Medicine at Owens College, William Thorburn was born on 7 April 1861, received his medical education at the Manchester Royal Infirmary, and afterward attended the practice of various hospitals in London. He took the degrees of B.Sc. and M.D. at the University of London with distinction, for he obtained the gold medals and was awarded a scholarship.

In 1886, he was elected F.R.C.S. Eng., and settled in Manchester, where he was appointed assistant surgeon to the Royal Infirmary. Here he made a reputation for the treatment of those injuries of the spine which at that time were frequent in the great manufacturing towns of the North. Thorburn documented the unique position of the elbows that occurs following cervical spine injury, later known as "Thorburn's position" The subject had received little attention except in connection with railway accidents. In 1890 he gained the Jacksonian Prize for an essay on "The Nature and Treatment of Injuries to the Spinal Column and the consequences arising therefrom."

Four years later he delivered a course of lectures on these injuries as Hunterian Professor of Pathology and Surgery at the Royal College of Surgeons of England, the lectures being afterward printed. From this time onwards he was regarded as the leading exponent of this branch of surgery. He chose it as the subject of the Bradshaw Lecture in December, 1922, when he summed up the results of his experience of nearly half a century.

In Manchester, Thorburn filled most of the positions of honour in scientific medicine, and he was appointed Deputy Lieutenant for the County of Lancaster; in 1913 he was one of the honorary secretaries of the Section of Surgery at the thirteenth International Congress of Medicine when it met in London.

The outbreak of the First World War found him already holding the rank of Lieutenant-Colonel in the Royal Army Medical Corps, Territorial Force, and he was placed in command of the 2nd Western General Hospital. The war having taken from him his three sons, he was appointed consulting surgeon with the temporary rank of Colonel A.M.S., at Malta, Gallipoli, and Salonika, and in 1917 he filled a similar position in France. For his services he was awarded a C.B. in 1916, and a C.M.G. and a military K.B.E. in 1919, while during his stay at Malta he was given the honorary degree of M.D. by the University of Malta.

From 1913 to 1923 he was a member of the Court of Examiners at the Royal College of Surgeons and he also served as an examiner in surgery at the University of London. In 1914, he was elected a member of the Council of the College of Surgeons, a position he still held at the time of his death. He married Augusta, daughter of W. E. Melland. Lady Thorburn died in the autumn of 1922, leaving three daughters.

Thorburn died on 18 March 1923, at the age of 61, at his residence in York Gate, Regent's Park. He was buried on 21 March at the Manchester Southern Cemetery.
