= John Charles (physician) =

British doctor (1893–1971)

Sir John Charles
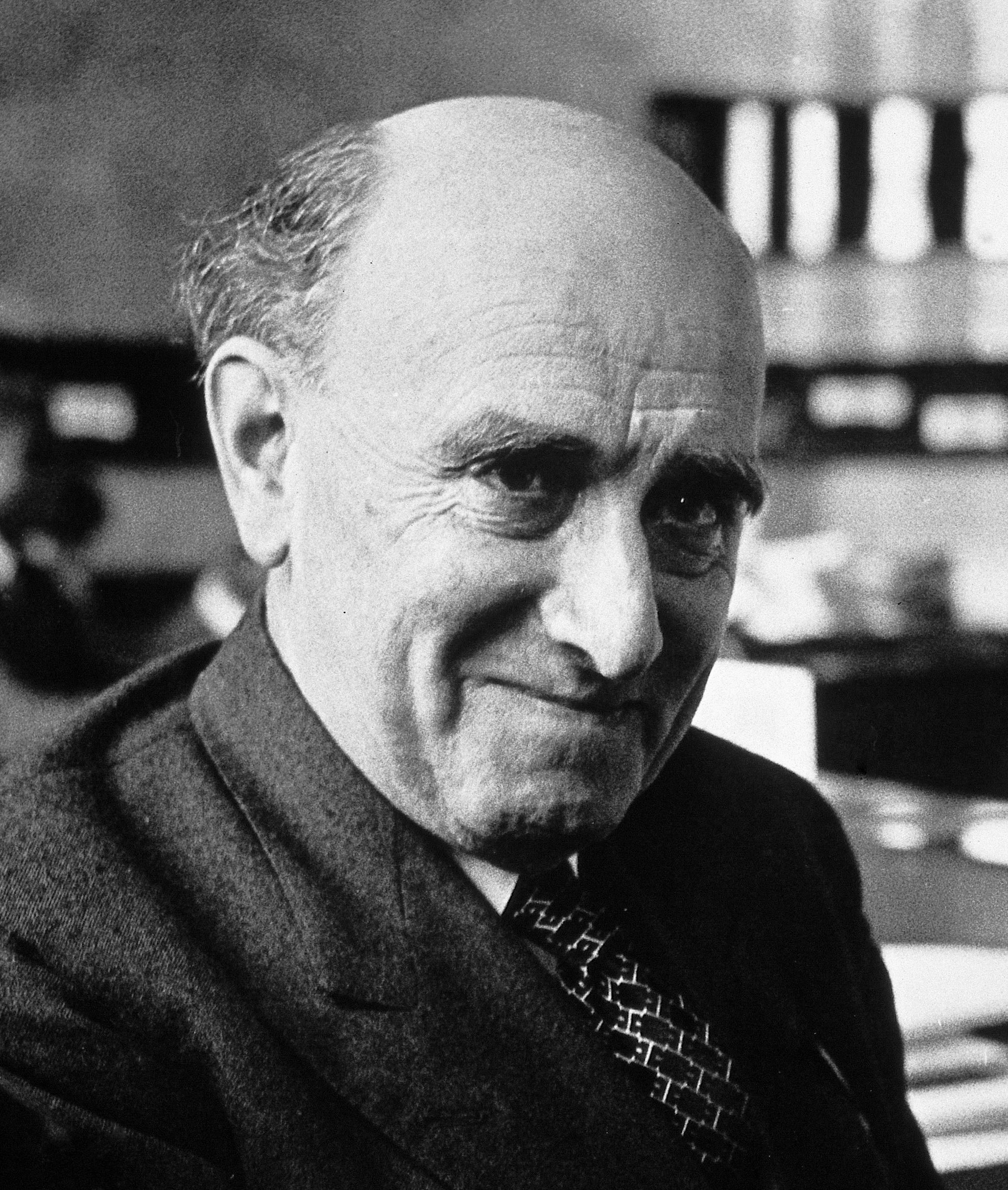
- Charles, while working in Newcastle
- Born: John Alexander Charles; 26 July 1893; Medomsley, County Durham, England
- Died: 6 April 1971 (aged 77); Newcastle upon Tyne, England
- Education: Durham University College of Medicine
- Spouse: Madeleine Frances Hume (m. 1947)
- Children: 2
- Scientific career
- Fields: Social Health

Sir John Alexander Charles KCB FRCP (26 July 1893 – 6 April 1971) was the tenth Chief Medical Officer of the Home Office of the United Kingdom.

== Life ==
Charles was the son of John Charles, a physician and JP who practised medicine in Stanley, County Durham. His mother was Margaret Dewar.

Charles's early education was taken at St Bees School, and then the Royal Grammar School in Newcastle-upon-Tyne. In 1916, Charles qualified in medicine at Durham University College of Medicine. In 1925, Charles took a Diploma in Public Health at University of Cambridge.

In 1947, Charles married Madeleine Frances Hume, who was the eldest daughter of William Errington Hume (1879–1960), Professor Emeritus of Medicine in Durham University, and his wife, Marie Élisabeth Tisseyre. She was the eldest daughter of a French Army colonel and his wife. The Charles couple had a son and daughter together.

== Career ==
During World War I, Charles worked in Royal Army Medical Corps, and was promoted to the rank of Captain and 1917, he posted to France, Belgium and later Italy. After the war, Charles worked with the British Army of the Rhine from when it initially established March 1919 to 1924.

Charles was appointed Assistant Medical Officer of Health for Newcastle Upon Tyne in 1928, becoming a tuberculosis officer at the City Hospital for Infectious Diseases, Newcastle Upon Tyne. Charles later became an assistant medical officer of health for the county of Wiltshire. Charles returned to Newcastle in City Hospital for Infectious Diseases in 1928, being promoted to medical officer for health in 1932.

Charles moved to London in 1944 as Deputy Chief Medical Officer where he assisted with the planning of the National Health Service. Charles was appointed Chief Medical Officer in 1950 and retired in 1960. He devoted considerable attention to the development of the World Health Organization for which he continued to work after his retirement.

== Contributions ==
When Charles succeeded Jameson in 1950, he became the first CMO to be appointed to the Home Office as well as the Ministry of Health and Department for Education. He encountered a greater range of medical work than his predecessors had experienced, and a much more rapid combined integration of scientific and medical research. It has been suggested that Charles was kept in his post as CMO due to him being content with the Ministry's weak stance on smoking. He should have retired aged 65 in 1958 under civil service rules.

Charles had a particular focus on the World Health Organization (WHO) and was Chairman of board during 1957 to 1958. In 1959 he was President of the Twelfth World Health Assembly and Chairman of the Fourth Expert Committee on Public Health Administration in 1960.

After Charles retired, he was appointed as a senior advisor to the WHO secretariat in Geneva, a position Charles held almost until his death in 1971. While in Geneva, he worked on the preparation and publication of the second and third editions World Health Situation Reports.

== Honours and awards ==
In 1962, he received the Léon Bernard Foundation Prize of World Health Organization for his contributions to medicine. In 1970, he was selected as the second Jacques Parisot Foundation Fellowship Lecturer to the World Health Assembly.
