= Stanford Cade =

British surgeon

- Cade in 1946
- Born: Stanford Kadinsky; 22 March 1895; Dwinsk, Russian Empire
- Died: 19 September 1973 (aged 78)
- Citizenship: British
- Education: Westminster Hospital Medical School
- Known for: The combined use of surgery and radiotherapy in the treatment of cancer
- Awards: Knight Commander of the Order of the British Empire; Companion of the Order of the Bath
- Scientific career
- Fields: Surgery
- Workplaces: Westminster Hospital, Mount Vernon Hospital

Sir Stanford Cade (formerly Kadinsky), KBE, CB (22 March 1895 – 19 September 1973) was a British surgeon of Russian origin, who pioneered the combined use of surgery and radiotherapy in the treatment of cancer in England. He was born in what was then the Russian Empire, educated in Antwerp, and started his medical training in Brussels. His training was interrupted by the First World War, and he was evacuated to England. Cade's medical education continued at Westminster Hospital Medical School, and following qualification he did various jobs at Westminster Hospital, finally being appointed consultant surgeon. He pioneered the combined use of radium or X rays in the treatment of cancer. During the Second World War, Cade was a member of the Royal Air Force Volunteer Reserve. In addition to his medical work, he also advised on improvements in the design of the cockpits of fighter planes, for which he was awarded a knighthood. After the war, Cade's work led to him gaining several honours and appointments. Cade wrote two books on the treatment of cancer.

== Early life and training ==
Stanford Cade, the son of a diamond merchant, was born in Dwinsk, then in the Russian Empire, now in Latvia. His family moved to St Petersburg, but at the age of eight he and his older brother were sent to school in Antwerp. In 1913 Cade commenced his medical studies at the University of Brussels. When the First World War started two years later he volunteered to serve in the Belgian Army, but when Antwerp was overrun he was evacuated to England. Cade could speak Russian, French, and German, but no English, and he was allowed to write his first medical examination, which he passed, in French. He went to King's College, London, and then won a scholarship to Westminster Hospital Medical School. Cade soon became fluent in speaking English, qualified as a doctor in 1917, and undertook a series of medical appointments at Westminster Hospital. During this time, he became a British subject, and changed his surname from Kadinsky to Cade. He was appointed consultant surgeon at Westminster Hospital in 1924, and later became surgeon to the Radium Institute and to Mount Vernon Hospital. Cade became a Fellow of the Royal College of Surgeons in 1923, Fellow of the Royal College of Obstetricians and Gynaecologists in 1954, and Fellow of the Royal College of Physicians in 1961.

== Career ==
At an early stage in his career, Cade took an interest in regional anaesthesia, and in 1925 his first Hunterian lecture was given on this subject. Following visits to the Radium Institute in Paris, he was influenced by the pioneering work of Claudius Regaud in the treatment of cancer by radiotherapy. Cade developed the therapeutic use of radium and X rays, combining this with surgery, and became an expert in these techniques. Together with other colleagues, he opened the Radium Annex of Westminster Hospital in Hampstead. In line with his multidisciplinary approach to cancer treatment, Cade conducted combined clinics with radiotherapists. During the Second World War he became a member of the Royal Air Force Volunteer Reserve, eventually achieving the rank of air vice marshal. During his service Cade's activities were not confined to surgery; he took an interest in the cause of injury to pilots, suggesting changes to the design of fighter planes cockpits. These were accepted and resulted in a reduction of casualties. For this work he was appointed a Companion of the Order of the Bath, and at the end of the war he was awarded a knighthood as a Knight Commander of the Order of the British Empire, and was appointed as an honorary air commodore. (Note: Cade is the only medical civilian to have been awarded this honour, and the only other civilian is Winston Churchill.)

Following the war Cade worked with the army and was appointed its honorary civilian consultant in radiotherapy. He was a member of the council of the Royal College of Surgeons, later becoming its vice-president, a member of its court of examiners, and was awarded its Guthrie Medal. Cade's work was recognised worldwide; he was given honorary memberships and gave lectures in countries including the US, Chile, France, Ireland, and Greece.

== Personal life ==
In 1920 Cade married Margaret Hester Agate, from Paisley, Scotland, who was a nurse at Westminster Hospital. She died from malaria in 1951 in South Africa when they were visiting the country together. They had three daughters, one of whom became a radiotherapist.

== Publications ==
=== Hunterian lectures ===
- 1925 Regional anaesthesia
- 1933 The radiation treatment of cancer of the mouth and pharynx
- 1954 Adrenalectomy

=== Books ===
- 1929 The Radium Treatment of Cancer
- 1940 Malignant Disease and its Treatment by Radium
