= University College London =

Public university in London, England

UCL
- Former names: London University (1826–1836); University College, London (1836–1907); University of London, University College (1907–1976); University College London (1977–2005; remains legal name)
- Motto: Latin: Cuncti adsint meritaeque expectent praemia palmae
- Motto in English: Let all come who by merit deserve the most reward
- Type: Public research university
- Established: 11 February 1826; 200 years ago (University status 2023)
- Academic affiliations: ACU; EUA; LERU; Russell Group; SES; University of London; Universities UK; Defence Universities Alliance
- Endowment: £175.0 million (2025)
- Budget: £2.163 billion (2024/25)
- Chair: Victor L. L. Chu
- Visitor: Sir Geoffrey Vos (as Master of the Rolls ex officio)
- Chancellor: Anne, Princess Royal (as Chancellor of the University of London)
- President and Provost: Michael Spence
- Academic staff: 10,400 (2024/25)
- Administrative staff: 7,020 (2024/25)
- Students: 51,315 (2024/25); 46,135 FTE (2024/25)
- Undergraduates: 25,705 (2024/25)
- Postgraduates: 25,610 (2024/25)
- Other students: 895 (studying wholly overseas; 2021/22)
- Location: London, England; 51°31′29″N 00°08′01″W
- Campus: Urban
- Colours: Purples and white
- Website: ucl.ac.uk

University College London, which operates as UCL, is a public research university in London, England. It is a member institution of the federal University of London, and is the second-largest university in the United Kingdom by total enrolment and the largest by postgraduate enrolment.

Established in 1826 as London University (although without university status or degree-awarding powers) by founders who were inspired by the radical ideas of Jeremy Bentham, UCL was the first university institution to be established in London, and the first in England to be entirely secular and to admit students regardless of their religion. It was also, in 1878, the second college in the United Kingdom to admit women alongside men, two years after University College, Bristol, had done so. Intended by its founders to be England's third university, politics forced it to accept the status of a college in 1836, when it received a royal charter and became one of the two founding colleges of the University of London, although it achieved de facto recognition as a university in the 1990s and formal university status in 2023. It has grown through mergers, including with the Institute of Ophthalmology (in 1995), the Institute of Neurology (in 1997), the Royal Free Hospital Medical School (in 1998), the Eastman Dental Institute (in 1999), the School of Slavonic and East European Studies (in 1999), the School of Pharmacy (in 2012) and the Institute of Education (in 2014).

UCL has its main campus in the Bloomsbury area of central London, with a number of institutes and teaching hospitals elsewhere in central London, and has a second campus, UCL East, at Queen Elizabeth Olympic Park in Stratford, East London. UCL is organised into 11 constituent faculties, within which there are over 100 departments, institutes and research centres. UCL operates several museums and collections in a wide range of fields, including the Petrie Museum of Egyptian Archaeology and the Grant Museum of Zoology and Comparative Anatomy, and administers the annual Orwell Prize in political writing. In 2024/25, UCL had a total income of £2.16 billion, of which £556.6 million was from research grants and contracts. The university generates around £10 billion annually for the UK economy, primarily through the spread of its research and knowledge (£4 billion) and the impact of its own spending (£3 billion).

UCL is a member of numerous academic organisations, including the Russell Group and the League of European Research Universities, and is part of UCL Partners, the world's largest academic health science centre. It is considered part of the "golden triangle" of research-intensive universities in southeast England. UCL has publishing and commercial activities including UCL Press, UCL Business and UCL Consultants.

UCL has many notable alumni, including political leaders such as the founder of the Republic of Mauritius and the first prime minister of Japan; cultural figures such as filmmaker Christopher Nolan, comedian and writer Ricky Gervais, and the members of Coldplay; and scientists including Francis Crick, one of the co-discoverers of the structure of DNA. UCL academics discovered five of the naturally occurring noble gases, discovered hormones, invented the vacuum tube, and made several foundational advances in modern statistics. As of 2025, 33 Nobel Prize laureates and three Fields Medal recipients have been affiliated with UCL as alumni or academic staff.

== History ==
=== 1826 to 1836 – London University ===
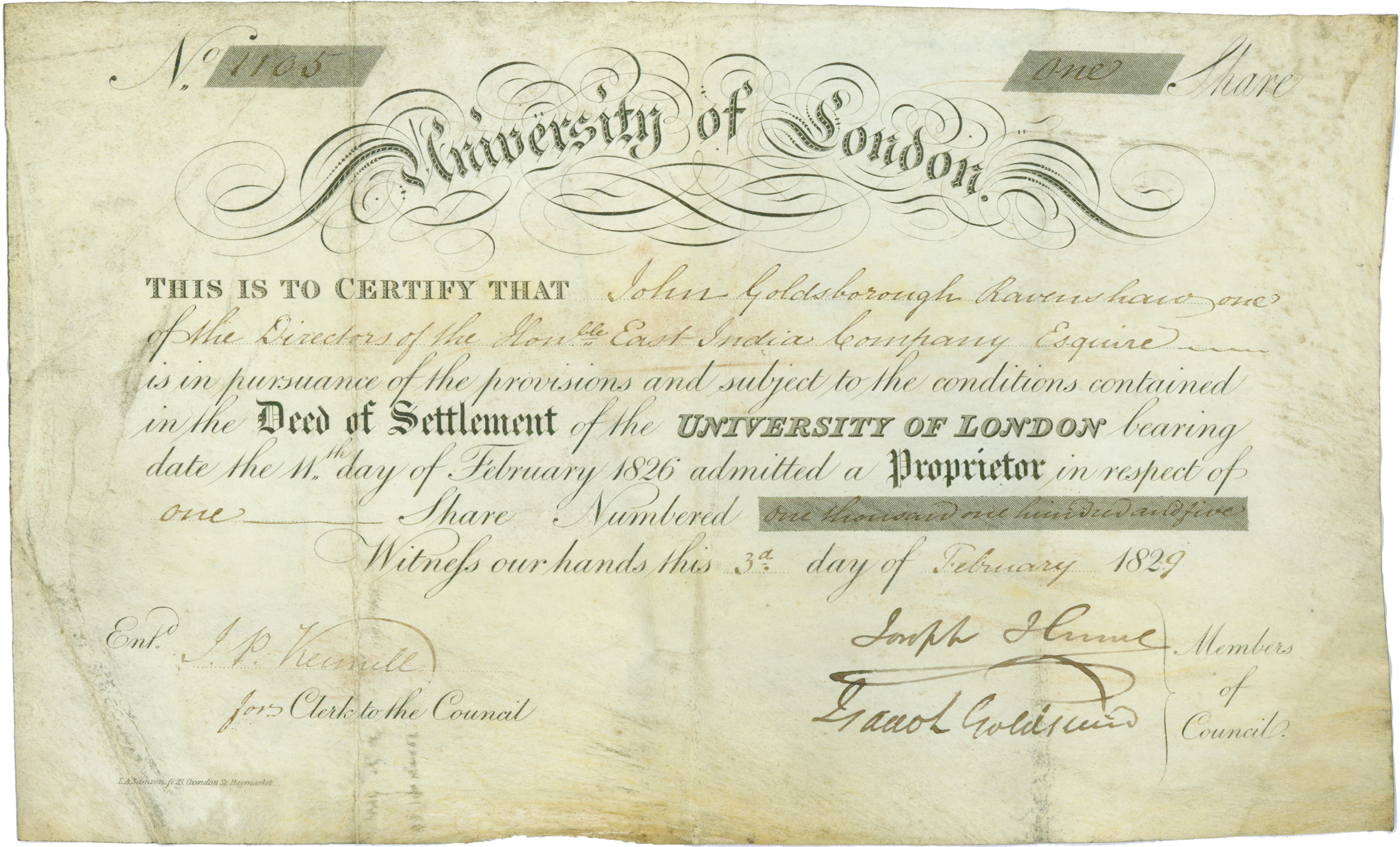
Share no. 1105 in the University of London, issued 3 February 1829

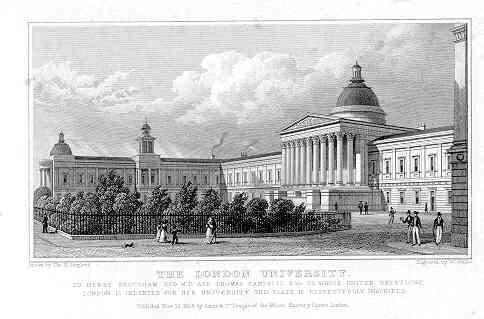
The London University (now the UCL Main Building) as imagined by Thomas Hosmer Shepherd in 1827–28, when construction was in progress. The portico and dome were completed in 1829, but lack of funds meant it would be many years before reality matched the picture.

UCL was founded on 11 February 1826 as an alternative to the Anglican universities of Oxford and Cambridge. It took the form of a joint stock company, with shares sold for £100 (equivalent to £8,600 in 2025) to proprietors, under the name of London University, although without legal recognition as a university or the associated right to award degrees. London University's first warden was Leonard Horner, who was the first scientist to head a British university.

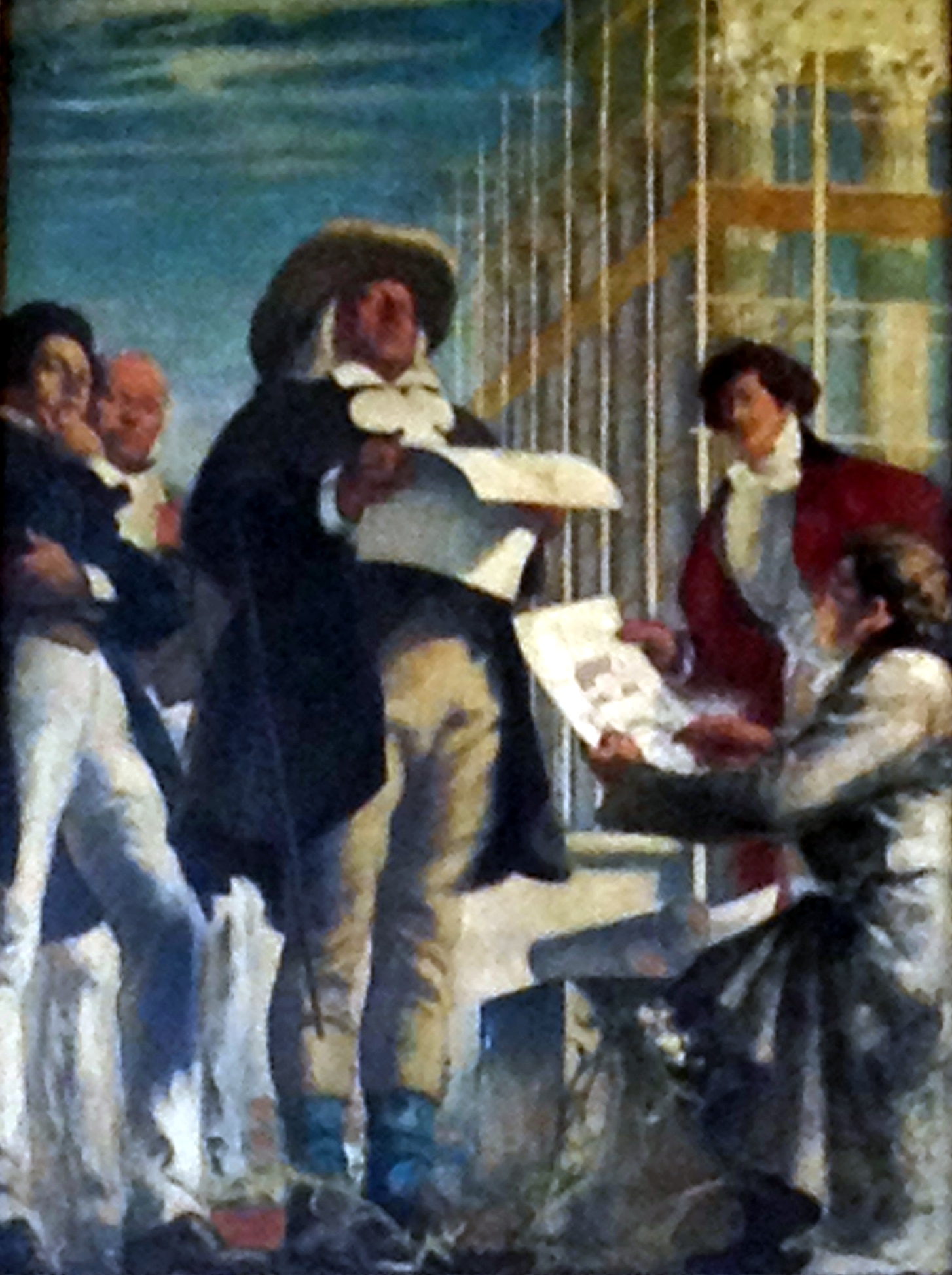
Henry Tonks' 1923 mural The Four Founders of UCL

Despite the commonly held belief that the philosopher Jeremy Bentham was the founder of UCL, his direct involvement was limited to the purchase of share No. 633, at a cost of £100 paid in nine instalments between December 1826 and January 1830. In 1828, he did nominate a friend to sit on the council, and in 1827, attempted to have his disciple John Bowring appointed as the first professor of English or History, but on both occasions his candidates were unsuccessful. However, Bentham is commonly regarded as the "spiritual father" of UCL, as his ideas on education and society were influential with the institution's founders, particularly James Mill (1773–1836) and Henry Brougham (1778–1868).

In 1828, the chair of political economy at London University was created, with John Ramsay McCulloch as the first incumbent. In 1829, the university appointed the first professor of English in England, although the course concentrated on linguistics and the modern teaching of English – studying English literature – was introduced by King's College London in 1831. In 1830, London University founded the London University School, which would later become University College School. In 1833, the university appointed Alexander Maconochie, secretary to the Royal Geographical Society, as the first professor of geography in Britain. Classes in medicine began at the opening of the college in 1828, and in 1834 University College Hospital (originally North London Hospital) opened as a teaching hospital for these classes, which were organised into a faculty of medicine in 1836.

=== 1836 to 1900 – University College, London ===
After almost a decade of attempting to win recognition as a university and the right to award degrees, including an Address to the Crown from the House of Commons, the proprietors of London University accepted the government's proposal to establish the University of London as an independent examining body, accepting the status of a college for their institution. As a result, the proprietors of London University were incorporated by royal charter under the name University College, London on 28 November 1836. On the same day, the University of London was created by royal charter as a degree-awarding examining board for students from affiliated schools and colleges, with University College and King's College, London being named in the charter as the first two affiliates. The first students from UCL and King's matriculated as undergraduates in 1838 and the first degrees were awarded to students of the two colleges in 1839.

There had been an intention to establish a course in engineering at the college's opening but no professor was appointed until 1840 or 1841, after engineering courses had started at Durham University (1837) and King's College London (1838). The Slade School of Fine Art was founded as part of University College in 1871, following a bequest from Felix Slade.

In 1878, the University of London gained a supplemental charter making it the first British university to be allowed to award degrees to women. The same year, UCL admitted women to the faculties of Arts and Law and of Science, although women remained barred from the faculties of Engineering and of Medicine (with the exception of courses on public health and hygiene). UCL's admission of women in 1878 came almost three decades after Bedford College became the first institution to offer university-level education for women in Britain, and the establishment of the University of London's General Examination for Women in 1868.

The Ladies' Educational Association held classes for women from 1868, taught by professors from UCL but independently of the college. From 1871 to 1872 these were held inside the college building, although still independently of the college. From 1872, some professors, particularly Edward Poynter of the Slade, started to admit women to their classes. The full opening on the faculties of arts, science and law in 1878 came two years after the admission of women alongside men at the University of Bristol from its foundation (as University College Bristol) in 1876. The first woman to officially enrol in architecture at UCL was Gertrude Leverkus in 1915, although Ethel and Bessie Charles had been allowed to audit classes in the 1890s. Women were finally admitted to medical studies during the First World War in 1917, although limitations were placed on their numbers after the war ended.

A new royal charter granted to the University of London in 1858 effectively removed the affiliation of colleges to the university. Dissatisfaction from the colleges and the desire for a "teaching university" in London led to royal commissions that reported in 1888 and 1892 and the reconstitution of the university under the University of London Act 1898.

=== 1900 to 1976 – University of London, University College ===
University College London (Transfer) Act 1905
- Act of Parliament
- Parliament of the United Kingdom
- Long title: An Act for transferring University College London to the University of London and for other matters connected therewith and for amending the University of London Act 1898.
- Citation: 5 Edw. 7. c. xci

Dates
- Royal assent: 11 July 1905
Other legislation
Amends	University of London Act 1898

Text of statute as originally enacted

Following the University of London's reconstitution in 1900, transforming it from an examining board to a federal university with constituent "schools", UCL became a school of the University of London. While most of the colleges that became schools of the university retained their autonomy, UCL chose to be merged into the university in 1907 under the University College London (Transfer) Act 1905 (5 Edw. 7. c. xci) and surrendered its legal independence in return for gaining a greater say in the running of the university. Its formal name became University of London, University College, although for most informal and external purposes the name "University College, London" (or the initialism UCL) was still used. As of 2022, it remains listed as "University of London: University College" on US Federal Student Aid applications.

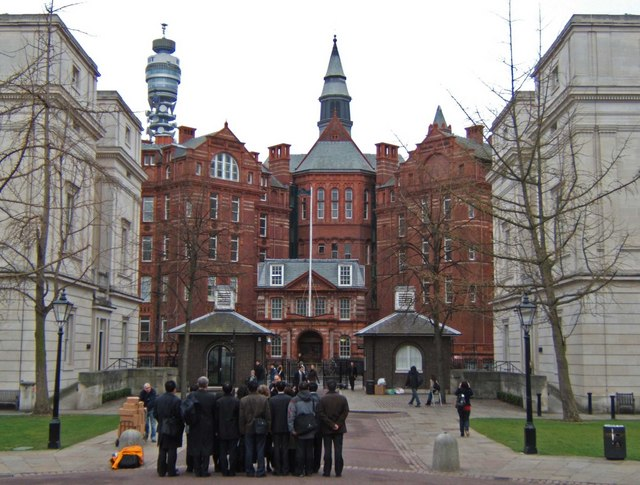
The Cruciform Building, seen from inside the quadrangle of the UCL Main Building

1900 also saw the decision to appoint a salaried head of the college. The first incumbent was Carey Foster, who served as Principal (as the post was originally titled) from 1900 to 1904. He was succeeded by Gregory Foster (no relation), and in 1906 the title was changed to Provost to avoid confusion with the principal of the University of London. Gregory Foster remained in post until 1929. In 1906, the Cruciform Building was opened as the new home for University College Hospital. UCL opened the first department and chair of chemical engineering in the UK, funded by the Ramsay Memorial Fund, in 1923.

In 1904, Francis Galton donated £1,000 to the University of London for a eugenics laboratory; this transferred to UCL in 1907 with Karl Pearson as its director. UCL apologised for its "fundamental role in the development, propagation and legitimisation of eugenics" in 2021.

In 1911, UCL received an anonymous donation of £30,000 (equivalent to £3,060,000 in 2025) for a building for its school of architecture. In 1919 the donor consented to being named as Herbert Bartlett and the school was renamed in his honour.

UCL sustained considerable bomb damage during the Second World War, including the complete destruction of the Great Hall, the Carey Foster Physics Laboratory and the Ramsay Laboratory. Fires gutted the library and destroyed much of the main building, including the dome; it was not until 1954 that the main building was fully restored. The departments were dispersed across the country to Aberystwyth, Bangor, Gwynedd, Cambridge, Oxford, Rothamsted near Harpenden, Hertfordshire and Sheffield, with the administration at Stanstead Bury near Ware, Hertfordshire. The first UCL student newspaper, Pi, was founded in 1946. The Institute of Jewish Studies relocated from Manchester to UCL in 1959. The Mullard Space Science Laboratory was established in 1967.

In 1973, Peter Kirstein's research group at UCL became one of only two international nodes on the ARPANET, later becoming part of SATNET. UCL's implementation of internetworking between the ARPANET and early British academic networks was the first international heterogeneous resource sharing network. UCL played a significant role in the very earliest experimental Internet work and adopted TCP/IP in 1982, ahead of the ARPANET. (Note: See also the Final Report of the Stanford University TCP project, IEN 151. IETF., written by Cerf in 1980. This was originally, in TCP version 2 in 1977 (IEN5), to be entitled "Final Report of the Internetwork TCP Project" and to be written by Cerf [Stanford], Stephen Edge [UCL], Andrew Hinchley [UCL], Richard Karp [Stanford], Peter T. Kirstein [UCL], and Paal Spilling [NDRE]. This title was carried over into version 3 (IEN21) and into the list of references in version 4 (IEN55) while the present title was adopted in the preface.)

The college's senior common room, the Housman Room, remained men-only until 1969. After two unsuccessful attempts, a motion was passed that ended segregation by sex at UCL. This was achieved by Brian Woledge (Fielden Professor of French at UCL from 1939 to 1971) and David Colquhoun, at that time a young lecturer in pharmacology.

=== 1976 to 2005 – University College London ===
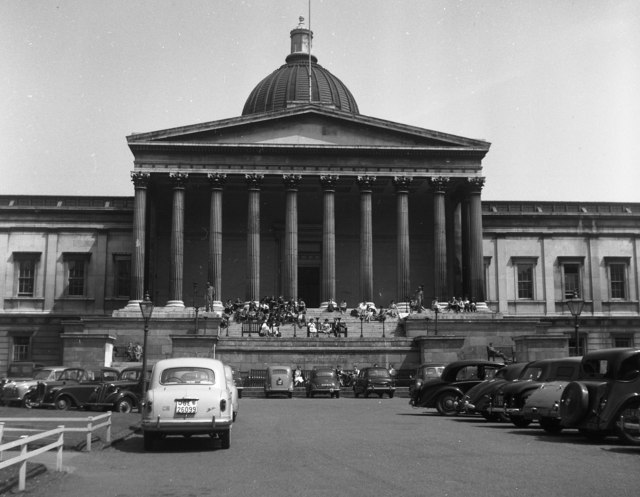
The Wilkins Building in 1956

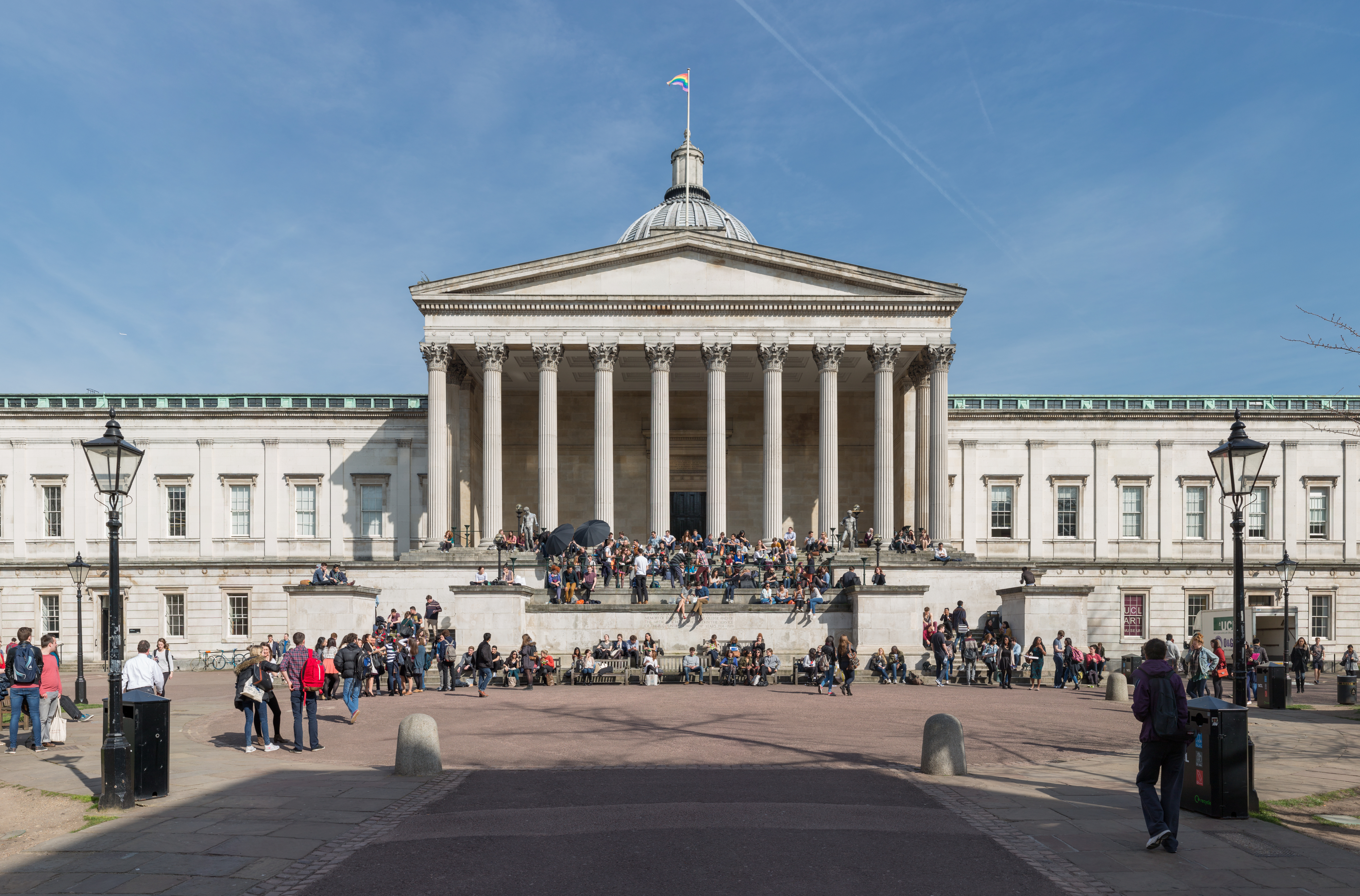
The Wilkins Building in 2014

In 1976, a new charter restored UCL's legal independence, although still without the power to award its own degrees. Under this charter the college became formally known as University College London. This name abandoned the comma used in its earlier name of University College, London.

In 1993, a reorganisation of the University of London meant that UCL and other colleges gained direct access to government funding and the right to confer University of London degrees themselves. This led to UCL being regarded as a de facto university in its own right.

Mergers were a major feature of this period of UCL's history. In 1986, the college merged with the Institute of Archaeology. In 1988, UCL merged with the Institute of Laryngology & Otology, the Institute of Orthopaedics, the Institute of Urology & Nephrology and Middlesex Hospital Medical School. Middlesex and University College hospitals, together with the Elizabeth Garrett Anderson Hospital and the Hospital for Tropical Diseases, formed the University College London Hospitals NHS Trust in 1994.

Mergers continued in the 1990s, with the Institute of Child Health joining in 1995, the School of Podiatry in 1996 and the Institute of Neurology in 1997. In 1998, UCL merged with the Royal Free Hospital Medical School to create the Royal Free and University College Medical School (renamed the UCL Medical School in October 2008). In 1999, UCL merged with the School of Slavonic and East European Studies and the Eastman Dental Institute.

Proposals for a merger between UCL and Imperial College London were announced in 2002. The proposal provoked strong opposition from UCL teaching staff and students and the AUT union, which criticised "the indecent haste and lack of consultation", leading to its abandonment by UCL provost Sir Derek Roberts.

=== From 2005 ===
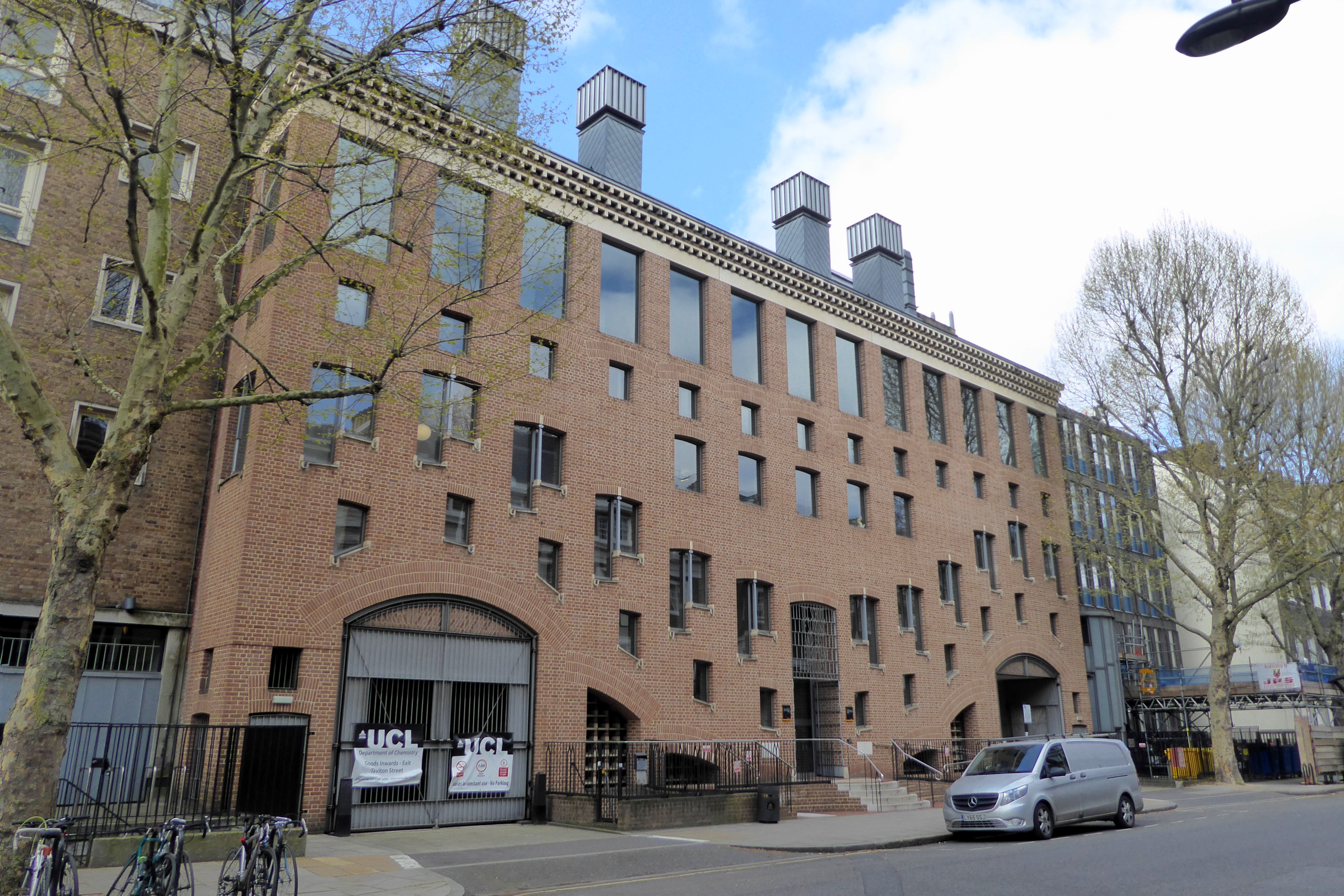
The UCL School of Slavonic and East European Studies building, which was opened in 2005

UCL was granted its own taught and research degree awarding powers in 2005, and all UCL students registered from 2007/08 qualified with UCL degrees. The same year, UCL adopted a new corporate branding under which the name University College London was replaced by the initialism UCL in all external communications.

UCL established the UCL School of Energy & Resources (later UCL Australia) in Adelaide, Australia, in 2008 as the first campus of a British university in the country. The school was based in the historic Torrens Building in Victoria Square. In 2011, the mining company BHP Billiton agreed to donate AU$10 million to UCL to fund the establishment of two energy institutes – the Energy Policy Institute, based in Adelaide, and the Institute for Sustainable Resources, based in London. UCL Australia closed in December 2017, with students and academic staff transferring to the University of South Australia. Since 2018, UCL and the University of South Australia have offered joint master's degrees in data science and in energy systems with study in Adelaide and London.

In 2011, UCL announced plans for a £500 million investment in its main Bloomsbury campus over 10 years, as well as the establishment of a new campus, UCL East, next to the Olympic Park in Stratford in the East End of London. In 2018, UCL opened UCL at Here East, at the Queen Elizabeth Olympic Park, offering courses jointly between the Bartlett Faculty of the Built Environment and the Faculty of Engineering Sciences. The first undergraduate students, on a new Engineering and Architectural Design MEng, started in September 2018. One Pool Street, the first building on the UCL East campus, opened in November 2022. UCL East was officially opened, along with the Marshgate building that completed phase 1 of the development, in September 2023 by Olympic gold medalist and UCL alumna Christine Ohuruogu.

UCL continued to grow through mergers with smaller colleges in the University of London. On 1 January 2012 the School of Pharmacy, University of London merged with UCL, becoming the UCL School of Pharmacy within the Faculty of Life Sciences. UCL and the Institute of Education formed a strategic alliance in October 2012, followed by a full merger in December 2014.

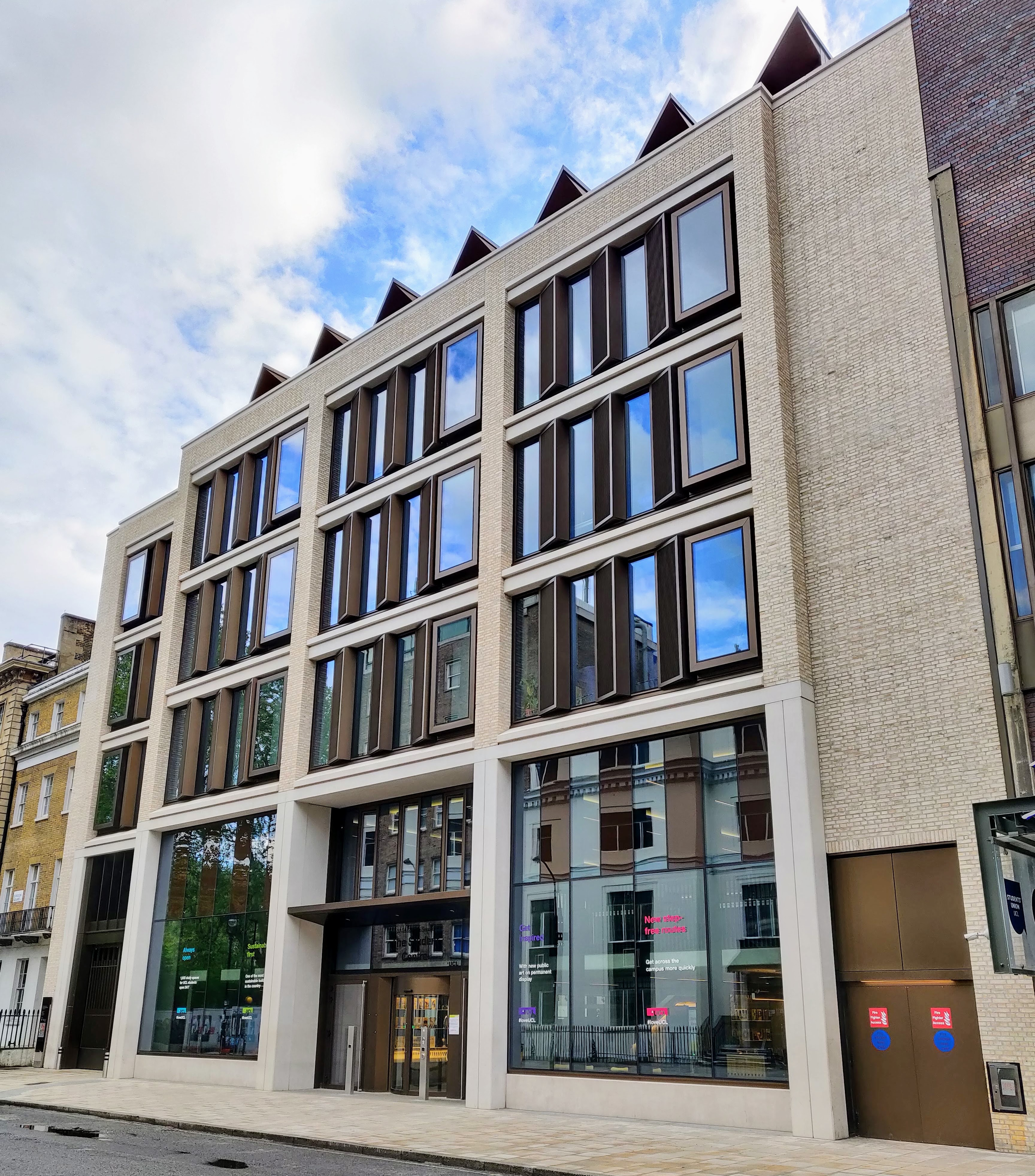
The new Student Centre on Gordon Street opened in 2019

UCL paid tens of thousands of pounds to settle ten sexual harassment claims against staff in the 2017/18 academic year, a rise from four cases the year before. Following pressure from victims, and after physicist Emma Chapman won the legal right to speak freely about her abuse at the university, UCL announced in 2018 that it would abandon non-disclosure settlements in settlements. In 2020, UCL became the first Russell Group university to ban romantic and sexual relationships between lecturers and their students.

It was discovered in 2018 that an annual eugenics conference, the London Conference on Intelligence, had been held at UCL, as an external paid event, between 2014 and 2017. An enquiry found that the organiser, an honorary lecturer, did not correctly follow the room booking procedure, including claiming that no controversial topics would be discussed, leaving the university unaware of the nature of the conference. Following the revelation, UCL announced in 2018 that it would launch an enquiry into the university's historical links with eugenics. This reported in 2020, but covered only historical eugenics and did not address the 2014–17 conferences, leading to a majority of the authors refusing to sign the final report. The Galton Lecture Theatre, Pearson Lecture Theatre and Pearson Building were all renamed in 2020, and in 2021 UCL apologised for its part in promoting eugenics during the first half of the 20th century. UCL was criticised (along with Oxford, Imperial and other London universities) in 2021 for accepting money from the Alexander Mosley Charitable Trust, established to hold the fortune left to Max Mosley by his father, British fascist leader Oswald Mosley. UCL received £500,000 to establish a forensic evidence interpretation laboratory.

Following the passing of the University of London Act 2018, which allowed member institutions to become universities in their own right while remaining part of the University of London, UCL applied for university status in 2019. The application was approved by the Office for Students in 2022 and a supplemental charter was sealed on 17 April 2023, granting UCL university status.

== Campus and locations ==
UCL campuses (red) and other facilities (blue) within London

=== Bloomsbury ===
UCL is primarily based in the Bloomsbury area of the London Borough of Camden, in Central London. The main campus is located around Gower Street, with many other departments close by in Bloomsbury. Many health institutes are located close to associated hospitals, including the UCL Queen Square Institute of Neurology and the National Hospital for Neurology and Neurosurgery in Queen Square, the UCL Great Ormond Street Institute of Child Health and Great Ormond Street Hospital for Children, and the UCL Eastman Dental Institute and Eastman Dental Hospital.

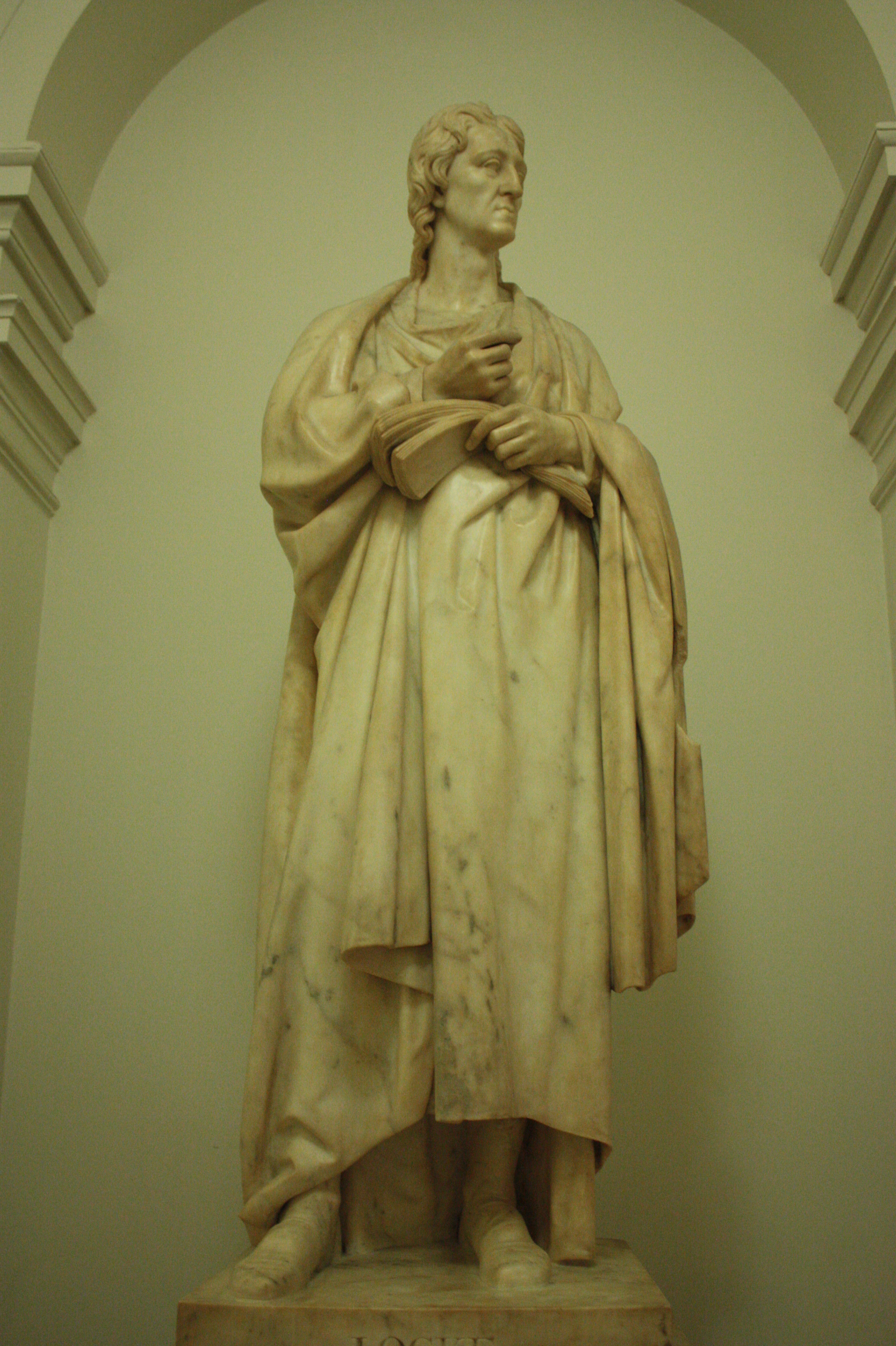
Statue of John Locke by Richard Westmacott, on display in the Main Building

Historic UCL buildings in Bloomsbury include the Grade I listed UCL Main Building, including the original Wilkins building designed by William Wilkins, and, directly opposite on Gower Street, the early 20th century Grade II listed Cruciform Building, the last major building designed by Alfred Waterhouse. Nearby are the Grade II listed Kathleen Lonsdale Building, UCL's first purpose-built chemistry laboratory, and the grade II listed Rockefeller Building. Elsewhere in Bloomsbury is the 1970s grade II* Institute of Education building by Denys Lasdun and Partners. Much of the estate falls within the Bloomsbury Conservation Area, designated in 1968. Important contemporary buildings include the School of Slavonic and East European Studies building (RIBA Award winner 2006) and the Sainsbury Wellcome Centre for Neural Circuits and Behaviour building (LEAF Award for best façade design and engineering and overall winner 2016).

In August 2024, UCL won a court case to regain control of part of its campus which had been occupied by pro-Gaza protesters since May.

UCL buildings in Bloomsbury
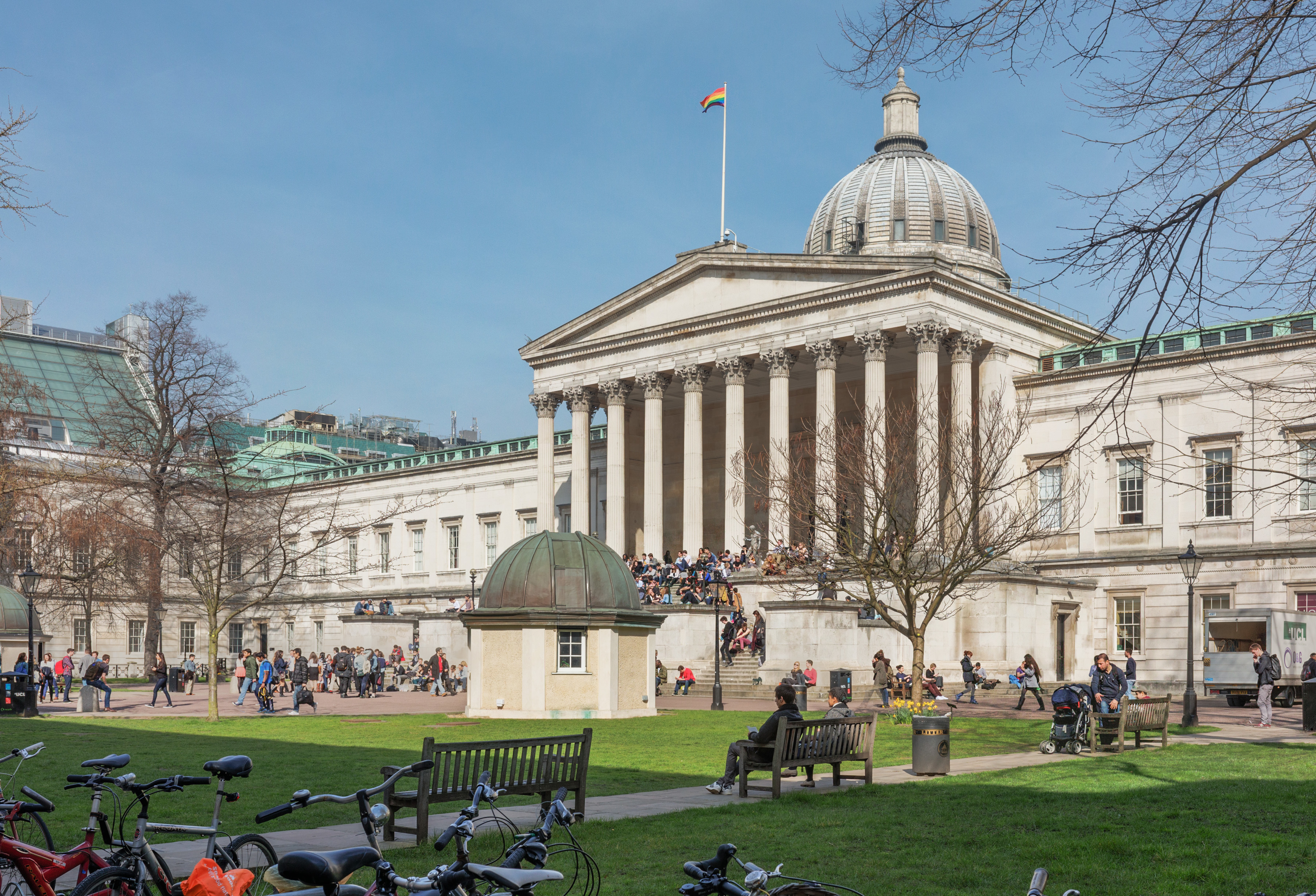
Wilkins Building and Main Quad

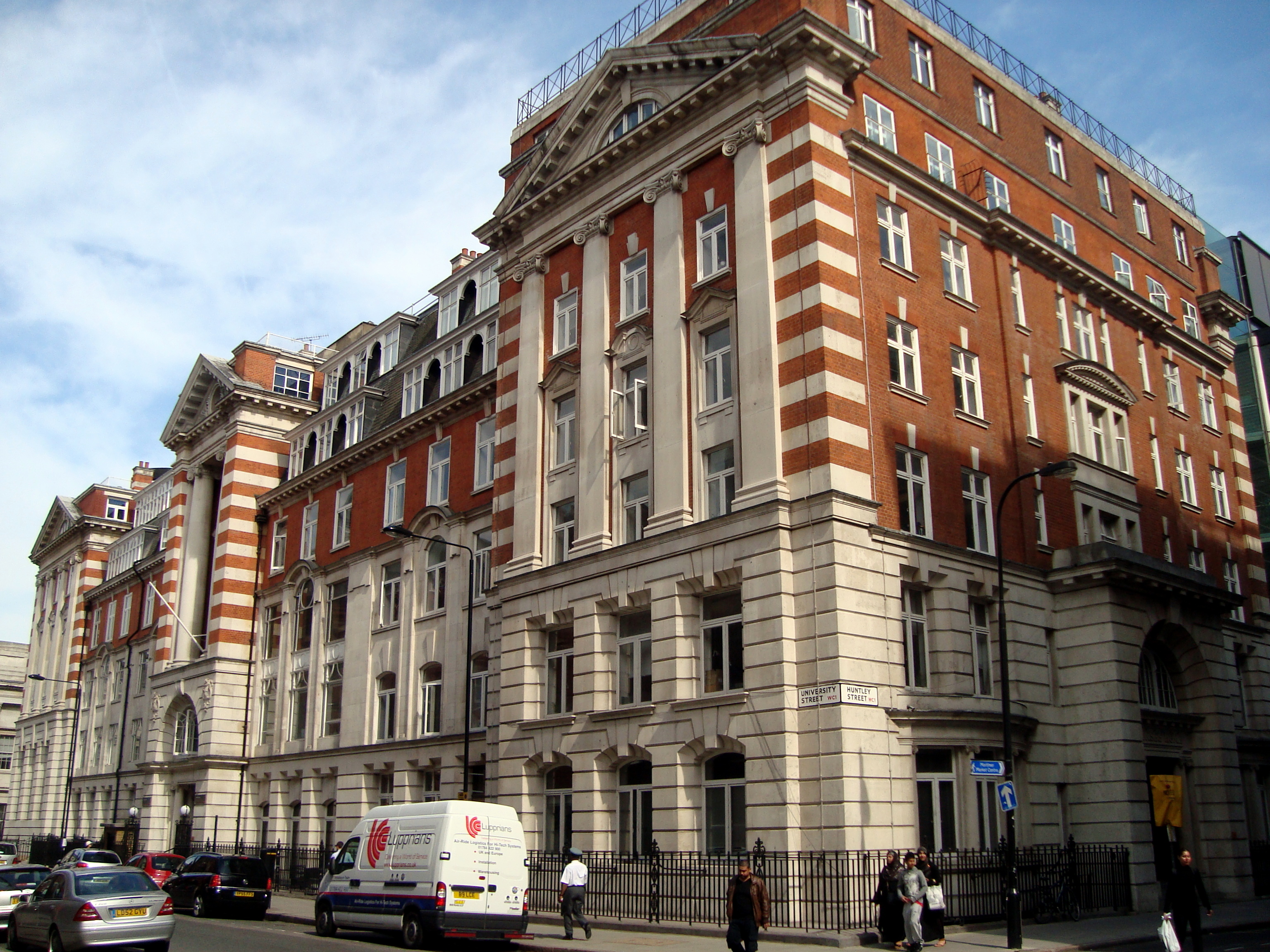
The Rockefeller Building on University Street, one of UCL's largest premises

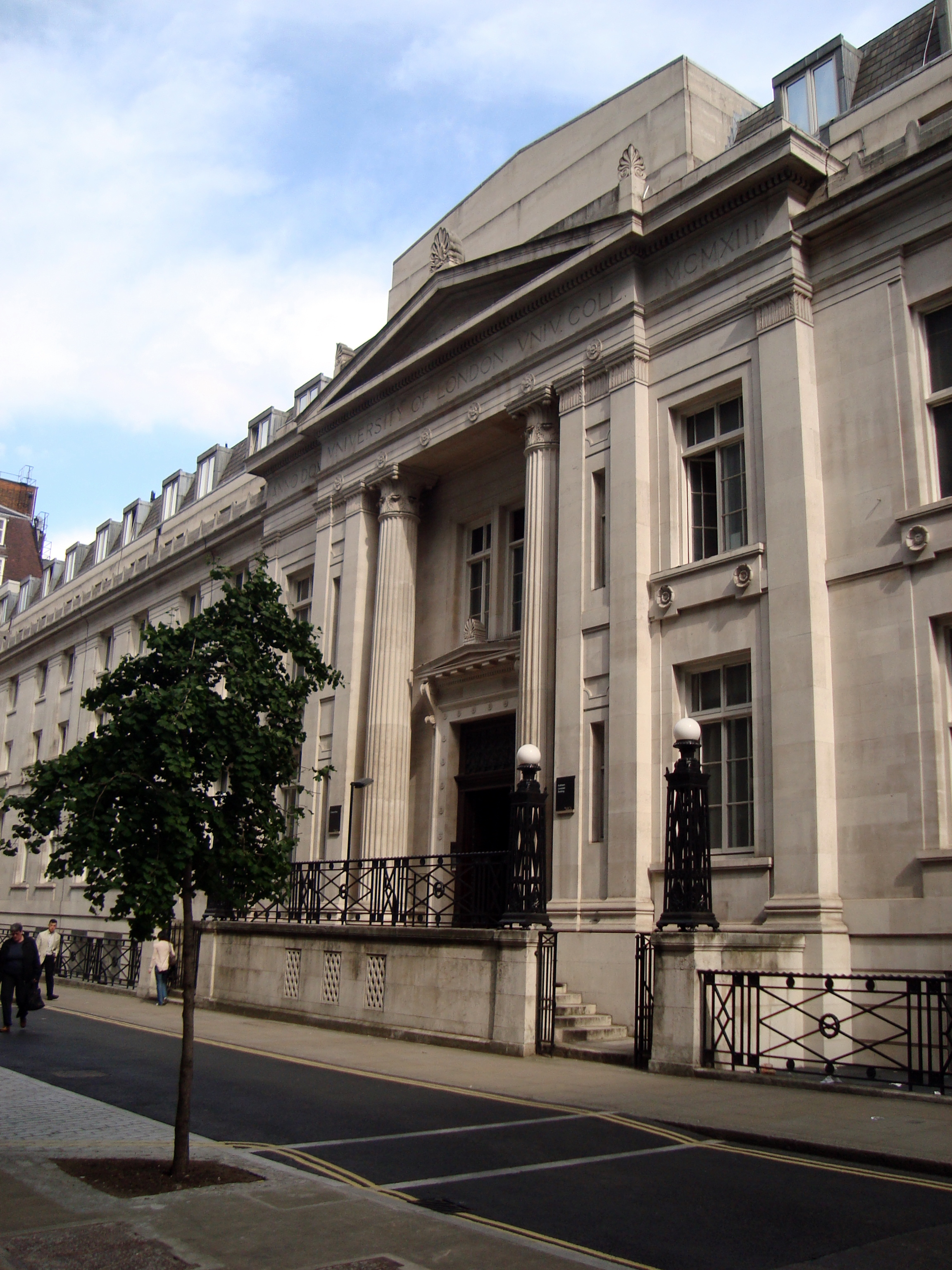
The Kathleen Lonsdale Building on Gower Place, home of UCL's department of earth sciences

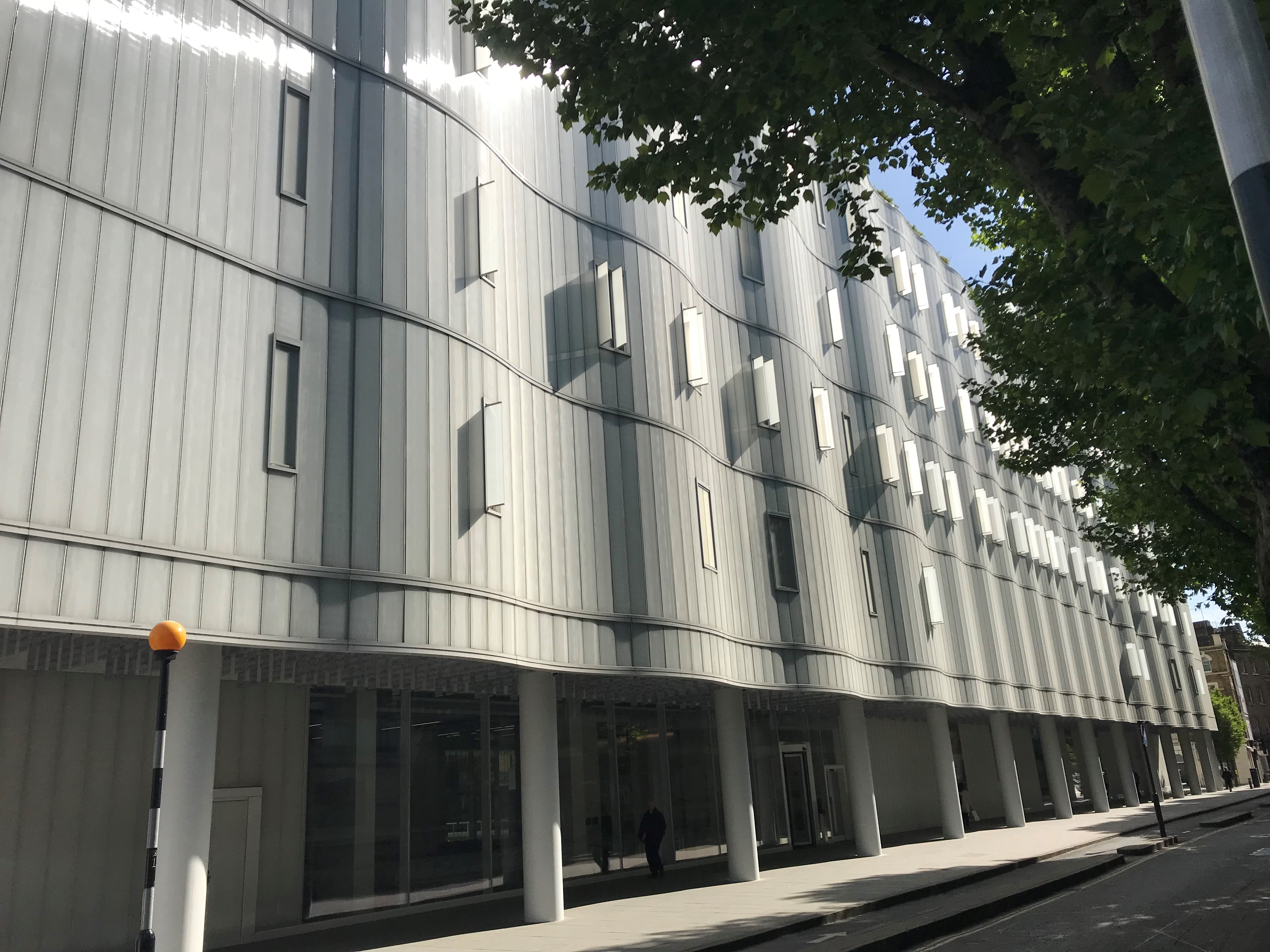
The Sainsbury Wellcome Centre for Neural Circuits and Behaviour building

=== UCL East ===
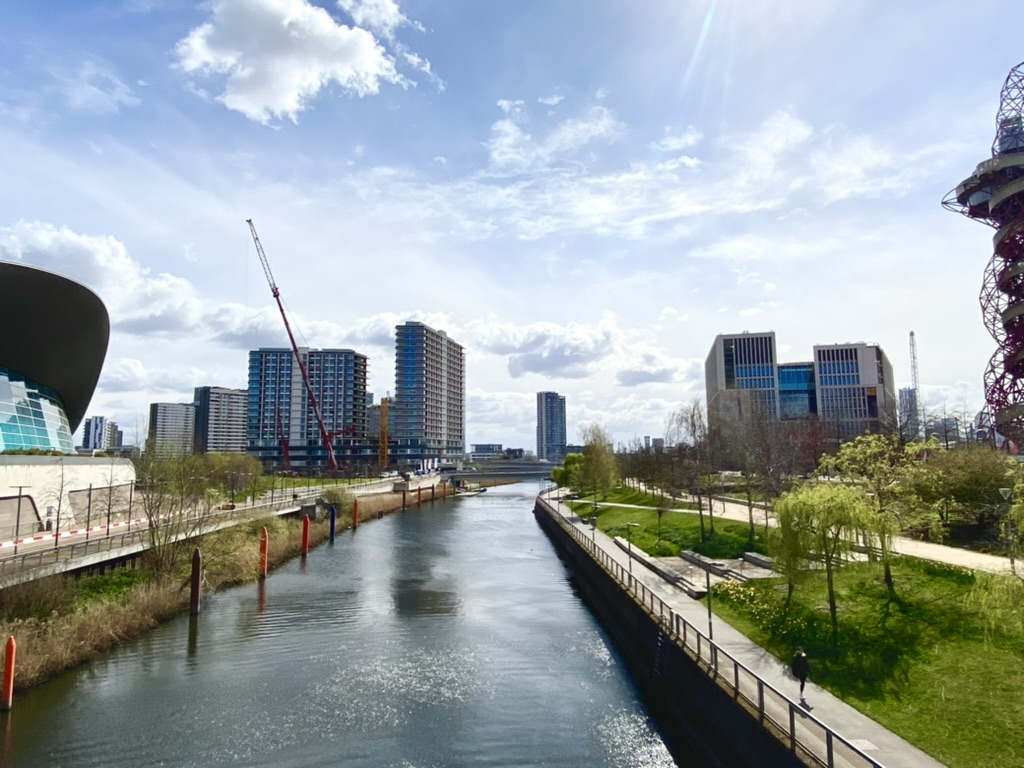
View of UCL East from the Queen Elizabeth Olympic Park, March 2022. One Pool Street is on the left-hand side of the river and Marshgate is on the right-hand side.

UCL has a second campus, UCL East, at the Queen Elizabeth Olympic Park in Stratford, East London. The first building, with three floors of teaching and research space as well as accommodation for 500 students in two towers, opened in 2022, and the second, with eight floors of teaching and research space, opened in 2023. A further four buildings are planned for construction in the 2030s. UCL also operates a campus within Here East, the former Olympic park media centre.

=== Other sites ===
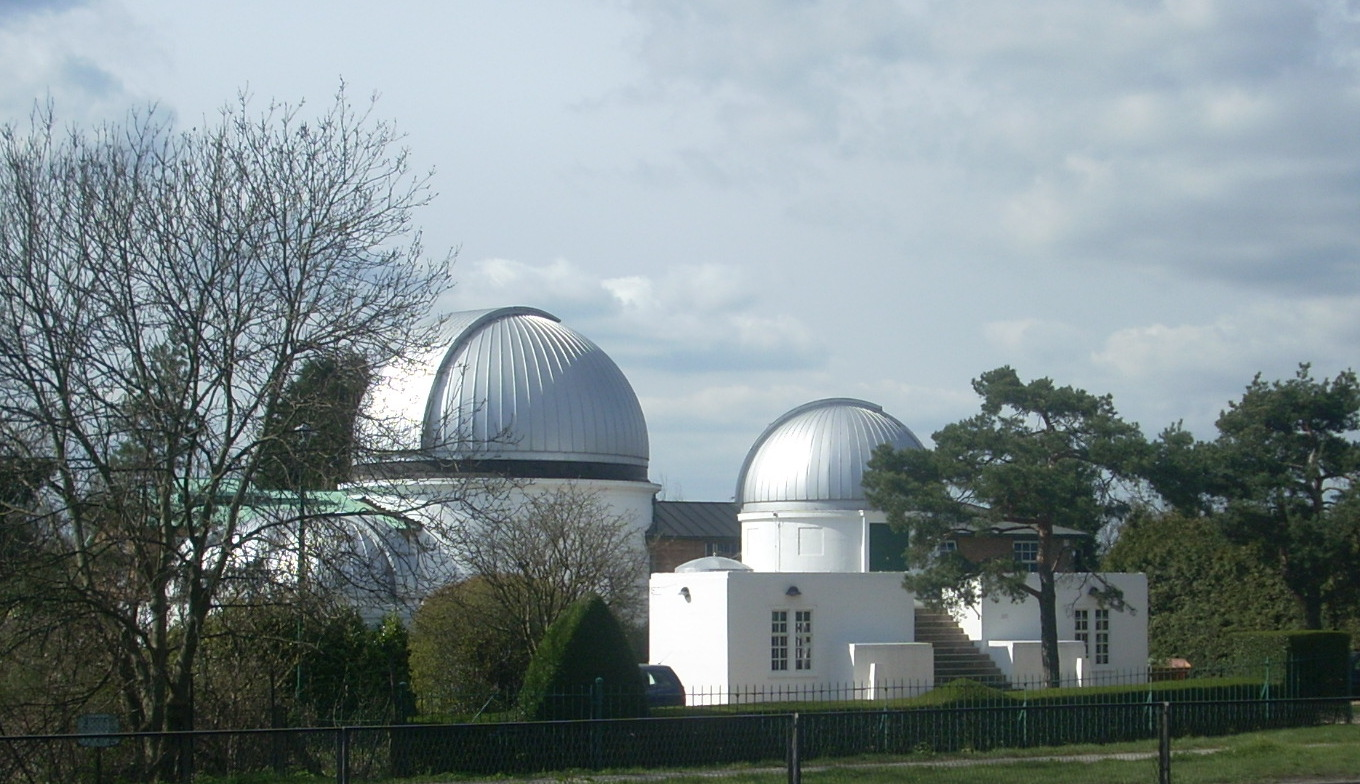
The UCL Observatory in Mill Hill

Elsewhere in Central London are the UCL Institute of Ophthalmology adjacent to Moorfields Eye Hospital in Clerkenwell, the Royal Free Hospital and the Whittington Hospital campuses of the UCL Medical School, and a number of other associated teaching hospitals. The UCL School of Management is on levels 38 and 50 (penthouse) of One Canada Square in the financial district of Canary Wharf. The UCL Observatory is in Mill Hill and the Mullard Space Science Laboratory is based in Holmbury St Mary, Surrey. The UCL Athletics Ground is in Shenley, Hertfordshire.

=== Student housing ===
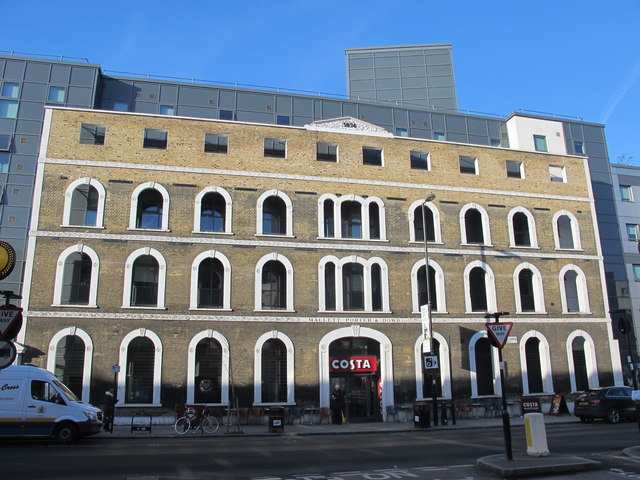
The retained historic facade of New Hall with the student residences one metre behind, many of their windows looking at the brick wall

UCL owns 26 halls of residence with around 7,000 student beds. The university guarantees accommodation to single full-time first-year undergraduate students who have not previously lived in London while studying at a university, and who make a firm acceptance of a place and apply for accommodation by 10 June each year, and to single overseas first-year postgraduates at UCL who have not previously lived in London while studying at a university, and who make a firm acceptance of a place and apply for accommodation by 30 June each year. Accommodation is also guaranteed for students who are under 18 at the start of the academic year and for students who are care-leavers. There is only limited accommodation available in university halls for returning students and others who do not meet the criteria for a guaranteed place. UCL students are also eligible, as students of a member institution of the University of London, to apply for places in the University of London intercollegiate halls of residence.

In 2013, UCL's newly built New Hall student accommodation building on Caledonian Road, designed by Stephen George and Partners, was awarded the Carbuncle Cup and named the country's worst new building by Building Design magazine, with the comment "this is a building that the jury struggled to see as remotely fit for human occupation". Islington Council had originally turned down planning permission for the building, but this had been overturned on appeal. As it is classified as a hotel or guest house, it was exempt from many of the standards that cover residential buildings, such as having daylight in the rooms.

The UCL East development includes 532 student rooms in One Pool Street, which opened in 2022. Further accommodation will be available in the Marshgate building, expected to open in 2023, and at the second Pool Street site.

=== Environmental initiatives ===
UCL's new Student Centre, which opened in 2019, was designed to be environmentally friendly and was one of only 320 buildings worldwide (at the time) to be certified outstanding by BREEAM. This certification requires innovation throughout the design, engineering and construction process, and places the Student Centre among the top 1% of non-domestic buildings in the UK for sustainability. The UCL Student Centre was a finalist at the Green Gown Awards in 2019.

Also in 2019, UCL launched a Strategy for Sustainable UCL 2019–24, including three initiatives to promote sustainability. The Positive Climate initiative saw UCL pledge to have a 40% reduction in energy usage, all energy to come from renewables, and all UCL buildings to be carbon neutral by 2024, along with achieving net zero carbon emissions for UCL by 2030. The Positive Climate initiative was the winner in the "2030 Climate Action" category at the 2020 Green Gown Awards.

A second initiative, The Loop, promotes circular economy. UCL set a target of reducing waste per person by 20% between 2019 and 2024, while aiming for an 85% recycling rate and the elimination of single-use plastics on campus. The third initiative, Wild Bloomsbury, promotes biodiversity. UCL set a target of creating 10,000 m^{2} (1.0 ha; 2.5 acres) of biodiverse green space on campus by 2024. The Strategy for a Sustainable UCL was a finalist in the "Sustainable Institution of the Year" category at the 2022 Green Gown Awards.

UCL was ranked joint fifth globally for sustainability in the QS World University Rankings: Sustainability 2025. In the national People and Planet University League for 2023/24, it was ranked 12th (1st class).

== Organisation and administration ==
=== Governance ===
The two main bodies in UCL's governance structure are the council and the academic board, both of which are established by the royal charter and with powers defined by the statutes. There is also a University Management Committee, which is the executive committee responsible for the day-to-day operations of the institution. This comprises the President and Provost, the vice-presidents, the vice-provosts, the pro-provost of UCL East, the deans of the faculties, the chief financial officer, chief information officer, and chief people officer, the chief of staff, the general consul, the executive director of media and marketing, and the director of media relations.

The senior leadership team at UCL includes the visitor, a position in English charity law that oversees the operation of the institution. That there shall be a visitor of the college is specified by the royal charter, as is that the position is to be held by the Master of the Rolls, the second most senior judge in England and Wales.

UCL's council comprises 20 members, of whom 11 are members external to UCL; seven are UCL academic staff, including the provost, three UCL professors and three non-professorial staff; and two are UCL students. The chair is appointed by council for a term not normally exceeding five years. The chair is ex officio chair of the honorary degrees and fellowships committee, nominations committee and remuneration and strategy committee. As of April 2023, the chair of the council is international businessman and UCL alumnus Victor Chu.

The academic board plays a role similar to the senate in other institutions. It is the senior academic body responsible for advising council on academic matters and also elects academic members to council. It is, however, a much larger body than the senates at many other universities, including all professors as well as elected representatives of other academic and non-academic staff.

UCL's principal academic and administrative officer is the President and Provost, who is also UCL's designated accountable officer for reporting to the Office for Students on behalf of UCL. The provost is appointed by Council after consultation with the academic board, and is ex officio a member of council and chair of the academic board. Michael Spence has been president and provost since January 2021, when he succeeded Michael Arthur.

Vice-provosts are appointed by council on the recommendation of the provost or the academic board, to assist and advise the provost as required. The vice-provosts are members of the provost's senior management team. There are four vice-provosts (for education and student experience; health; research, innovation and global engagement; and faculties). There are also four vice-presidents, who are also members of the senior management team but whose role and manner of appointment is not specified in the statutes, for strategy, external engagement, advancement and operations.

The deans of UCL's faculties are appointed by the council and are members of the provost's senior management team. The deans' principal duties include advising the provost and vice-provosts on academic strategy, staffing matters and resources for academic departments within their faculty; overseeing curricula and programme management at faculty level; liaising with faculty tutors on undergraduate admissions and student academic matters; overseeing examination matters at faculty level; and co-ordinating faculty views on matters relating to education and information support.

=== Faculties and departments ===
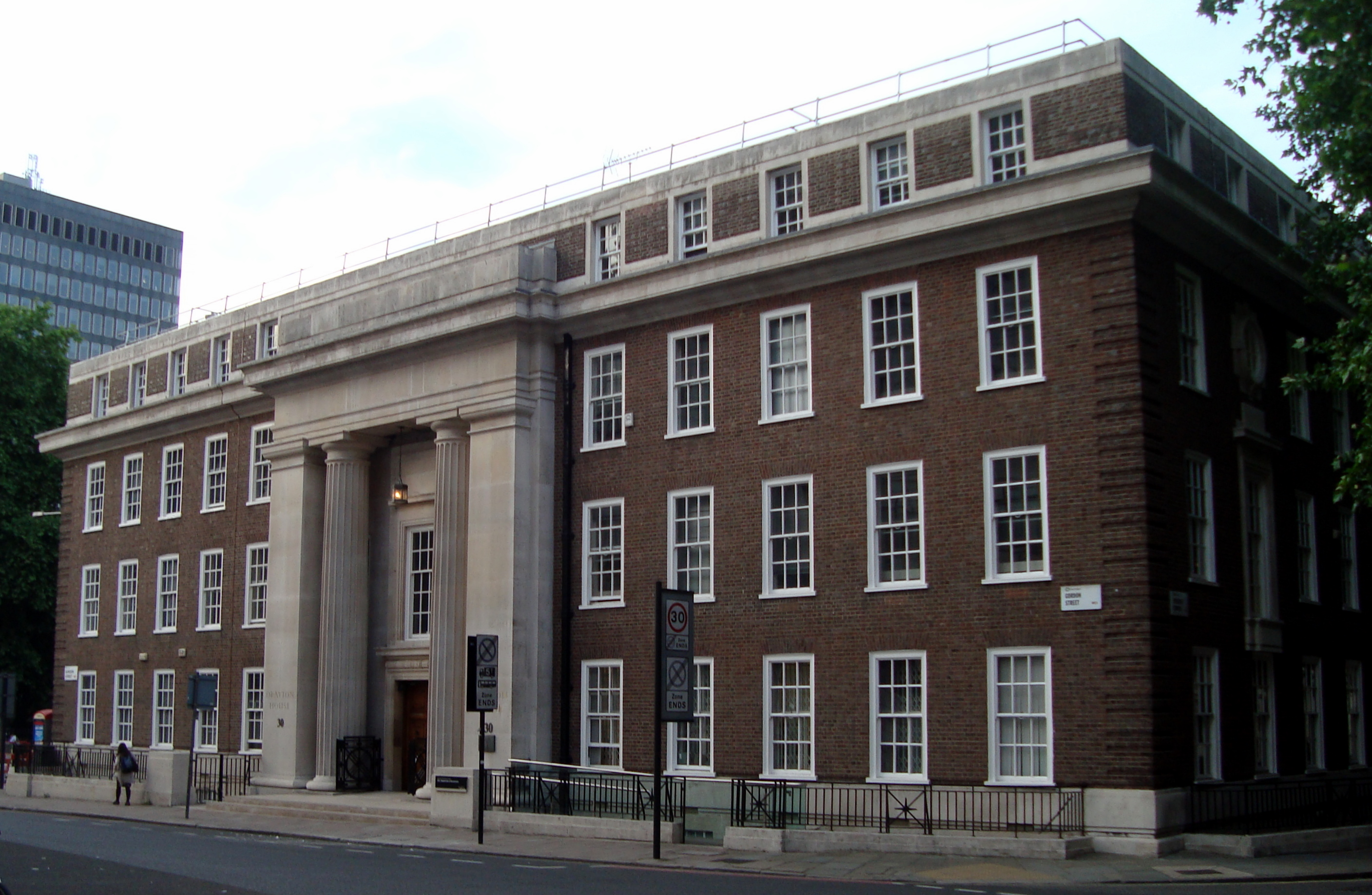
Drayton House, which houses the Department of Economics

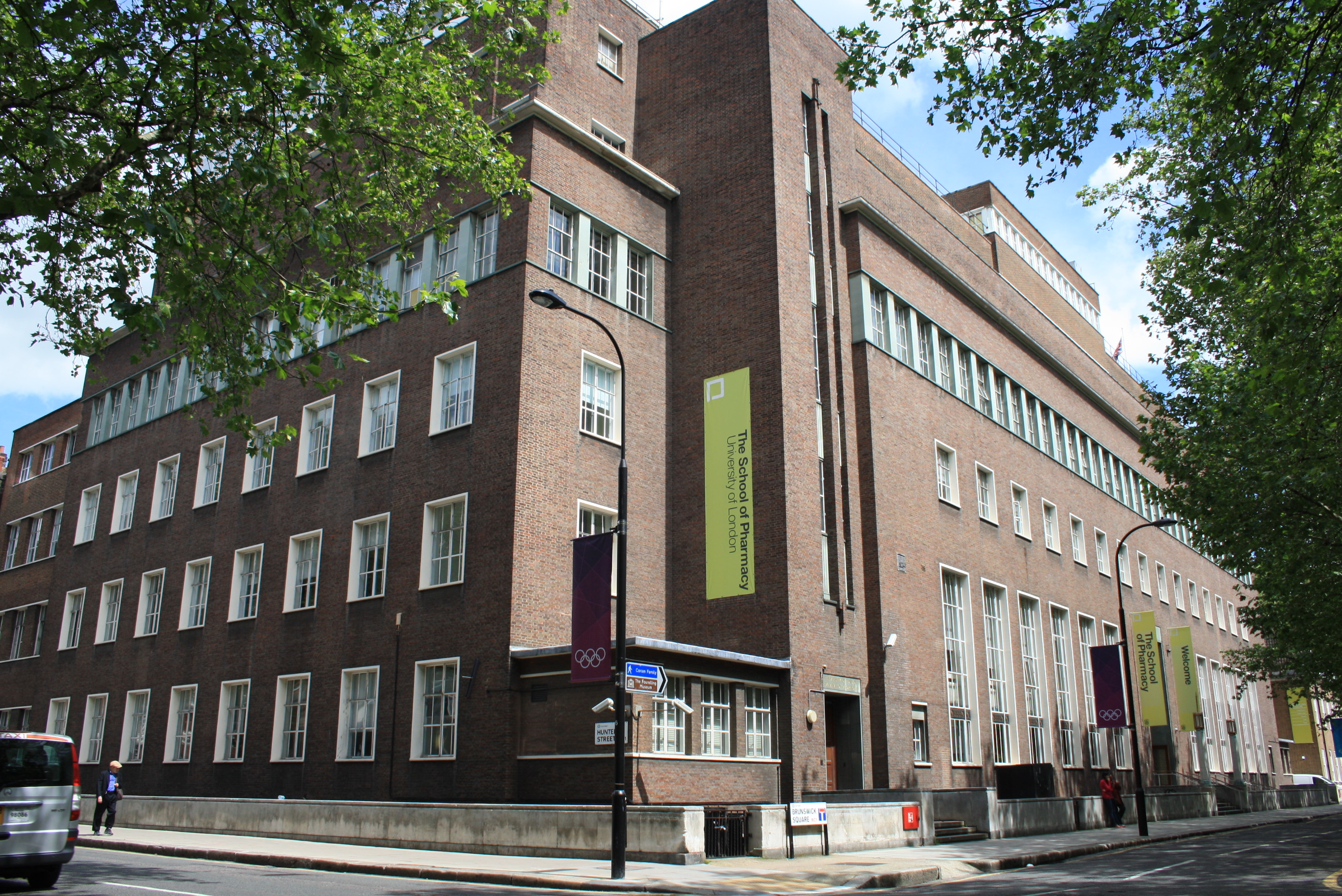
The UCL School of Pharmacy building

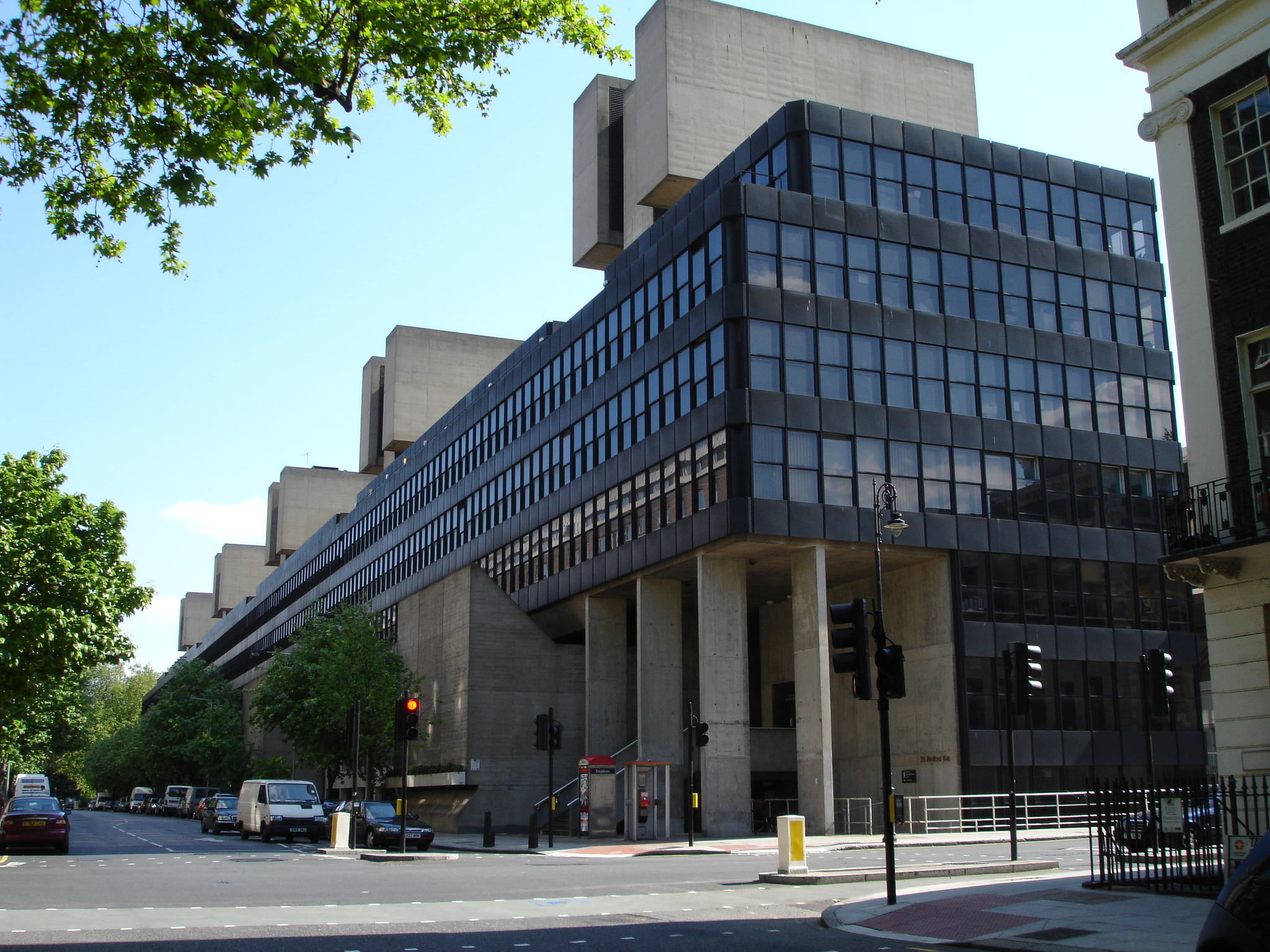
The Institute of Education building, home to the UCL Institute of Education and the Departments of Geography, Psychology and Language

UCL's research and teaching is organised into eleven faculties, each of which contains a number of schools, departments and institutes. The establishment of faculties and academic departments is formally the responsibility of UCL's council, with advice from the academic board.

Faculty statistics 2023
Faculty	Staff	Students		
Faculty	Staff	Undergraduates	Postgraduates	
Faculty	Staff	Undergraduates	Taught	Research
Arts and Humanities	620	2,684	943	226
Bartlett (Built Environment)	1,272	925	2,836	411
Brain Sciences	1,725	929	1,961	1,034
Engineering Sciences	667	4,373	2,791	1,122
IOE (Education and Society)	1,318	1,515	3,988	684
Laws	175	844	450	49
Life Sciences	964	2,632	1,084	592
Mathematical and Physical Sciences	1,135	3,927	929	680
Medical Sciences	1,321	2,356	1,287	430
Population Health Sciences	1,578	247	1,365	447
Social and Historical Sciences	1,101	4,130	2,054	488

There are also academic units outside the faculty structure, namely:

- Sainsbury Wellcome Centre for Neural Circuits and Behaviour

The School of Slavonic and East European Studies remained autonomous until 2023. It was integrated into UCL Arts and Humanities faculty at the time with 193 staff; 559 undergraduate students; 57 taught postgraduate students; 29 research postgraduate students (2022/23).

There are additional staff employed outside the faculty structure in the university administration.

=== Finances ===
In the financial year ended 31 July 2024, UCL had a total income (excluding share of joint ventures) of £2.03 billion (2022/23 – £1.93 billion) and a total expenditure of £1.47 billion (2022/23 – £1.71 billion). Key sources of income included £538.8 million from research grants and contracts (2022/23 – £526.7 million), £971.2 million from tuition fees and education contracts (2022/23 – £929.3 million), £228.1 million from funding body grants (2022/23 – £236.7 million) and £34.1 million from donations and endowments (2022/23 – £31.5 million). At year end UCL had endowments of £174.8 million (31 July 2023 – £156.8 million) and total net assets of £2.19 billion (31 July 2023 – £1.61 million).

A report by London Economics in 2022 found that UCL generates around £10 billion annually for the UK economy. The largest contributor to this is through the spread of its research and knowledge, which is worth £4 billion, with another £3 billion being added by the impact of UCL's own spending. Other contributions come from encouraging graduates to create jobs and investment, and from nurturing company spin-offs and start-ups. The report found that in 2018–19, UCL had supported 234 graduate start-ups and 83 spinout companies, with a total turnover of £110 million and employing almost 3,000 people. The report also found that UCL's spending supported 19,000 jobs across the UK, with over 7,000 of these being outside London.

=== Terms ===
The UCL academic year is divided into three terms. For most departments, First Term runs from late September to mid-December, Second Term from mid-January to late March, and Third Term from late April to mid-June, with reading weeks in early November and mid-February. Certain courses at the medical school, the faculty of education and society, and the school of pharmacy operate on different terms.

=== Logo and colours ===
Pre-2005 logo

While many universities use their logo for most communications and branding and a coat of arms only for specific ceremonial and official use, UCL exclusively uses a logo and has no coat of arms. The logo has always depicted a stylised representation of the Wilkins Building portico and the initialism "UCL", but three different designs have been used at different times. The first was a monochrome representation of the Wilkins Building with the letters "UCL" incorporated into it. This was replaced in 2005, as part of a wider rebranding exercise, by a smaller representation of the portico to the left, and the initialism at twice its height to the right, again all monochrome. This version was replaced in turn in 2026, marking the college's bicentenary, by the present logo, which shows the initialism to the left and the portico to the right, all at the same height, and in dark and bright purple, with other variant formats permitted.

A pseudo-heraldic "UCL crest" – a purple shield depicting a raised bent arm dressed in armour between two gold laurel branches holding a green upturned open wreath, with the college motto on a blue celeste ribbon beneath the laurel branches – can be found on the internet. A version of this badge (not on a shield) appears to have been used by UCL Union from shortly after its foundation in 1893. However, the badge has never been the subject of an official grant of arms, and departs from several of the rules and conventions of heraldry. It is not an official logo, although modified forms are used by some by sports teams and societies. The official Team UCL logo, used (with variants) by many sports teams, uses a shield divided into the colours of purple (lower) and blue celeste (upper), but none of the other elements (laurels, wreaths, armoured arm, motto) are present; the only graphic is a depiction of the UCL portico. Students' Union UCL requests teams not to modify this logo, but this is widely ignored.

UCL's motto, "Cuncti adsint meritaeque expectent praemia palmae" is a quotation from Virgil's Aeneid, and translates into English as "Let all come who by merit deserve the most reward".

UCL's traditional sporting and academic colours are purple and blue celeste. UCL now uses a palette of 25 colours (including the two traditional colours) in its visual identity; the logo can be used in many different combinations of these colours.

=== Memberships, affiliations and partnerships ===
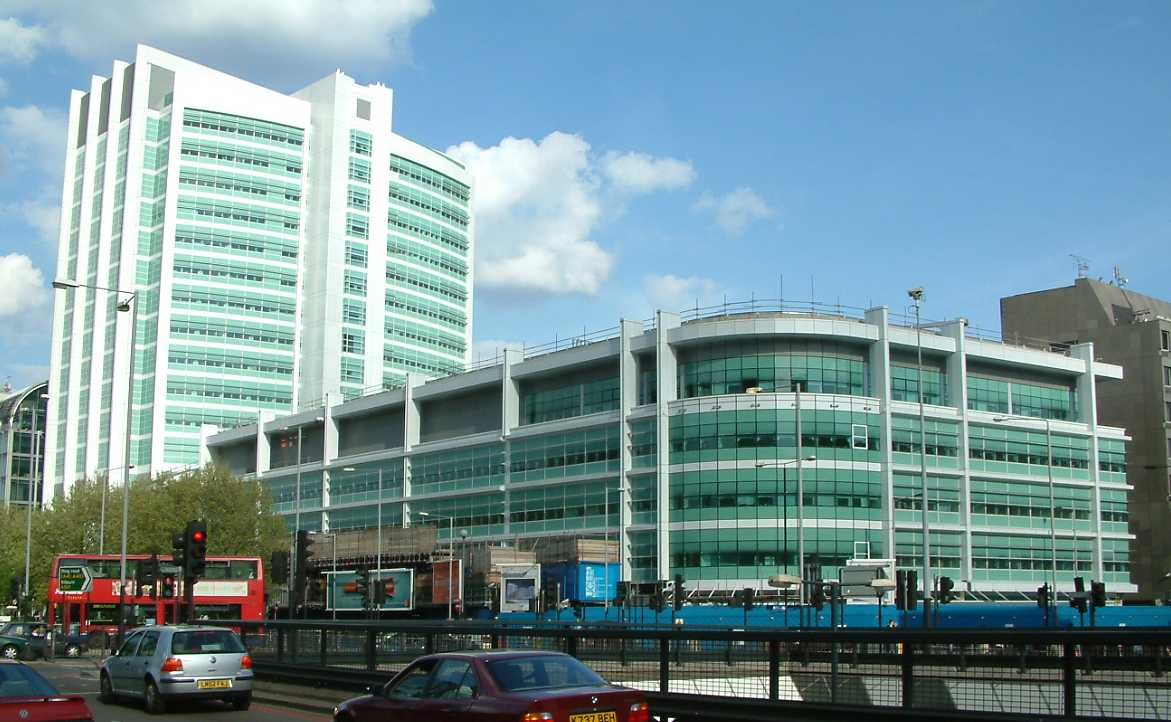
The main building of University College Hospital opened in 2005

UCL is a member institution of the federal University of London and was one of the two colleges affiliated from the university's founding in 1836 (the other being King's College London). UCL was a founding member of the Russell Group, an association of 24 British research universities established in 1994, and is regarded as forming part of the 'golden triangle', an unofficial term for the research-intensive universities located in the southern English cities of Cambridge, London and Oxford.

UCL has been a member of the League of European Research Universities since January 2006. UCL is also a member of the Association of Commonwealth Universities, the European University Association, the global U7+ Alliance and the US Universities Research Association, and has a major collaboration with Yale University, the Yale UCL Collaborative. It also has partnerships with universities in Australia, (Note: the University of Sydney) Canada, (Note: the University of Toronto) China, (Note: Peking University, Zhejiang University, Shanghai Jiao Tong University and the University of Hong Kong) India, (Note: All India Institutes of Medical Sciences, the Indian Institute of Science, the Indian Institute of Technology, Delhi and the Indian Institute of Technology, Madras) Japan, (Note: Osaka University) Singapore (Note: the National University of Singapore) and Thailand. (Note: HRH Princess Chulabhorn College of Medical Science)

UCL formed the Science and Engineering South engineering and physical sciences research alliance with the universities of Cambridge, Oxford, Southampton and Imperial College London in May 2013. It was also one of the founding members of the Alan Turing Institute, the UK's national institute for data sciences and artificial intelligence, in 2015, with the universities of Cambridge, Edinburgh, Oxford and Warwick.

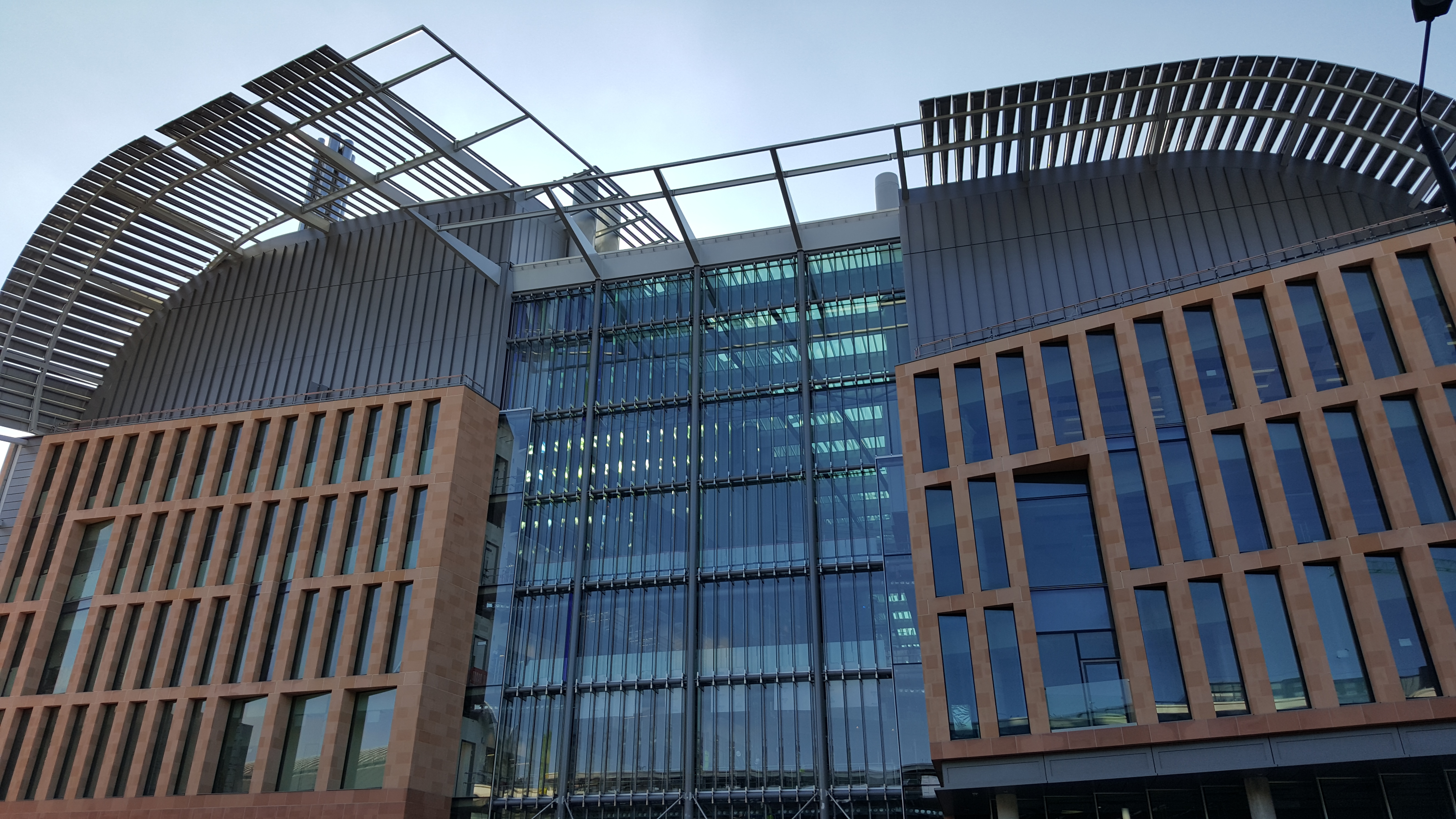
The Francis Crick Institute building completed in 2016

UCL is a partner in UCLPartners, an academic health science centre, along with multiple NHS trusts, integrated care systems, research and innovation partners, and other universities. UCL is a partner with the National Institute for Health Research, the University College London Hospitals NHS Foundation Trust and UCLPartners in the UCLH Biomedical Research Centre. UCL is also a university partner of the Francis Crick Institute, a major biomedical research centre in London.

UCL offers dual degrees and joint degrees with other universities and institutions, including the University of Cologne, Columbia University, the University of Hong Kong, Imperial College London (ended in 2023) and New York University.

UCL is the sponsor of the UCL Academy, a secondary school in the London Borough of Camden. The school opened in September 2012 and was the first in the UK to have a university as sole sponsor. UCL also has a strategic partnership with Newham Collegiate Sixth Form Centre.

== Academic profile ==
=== Research ===
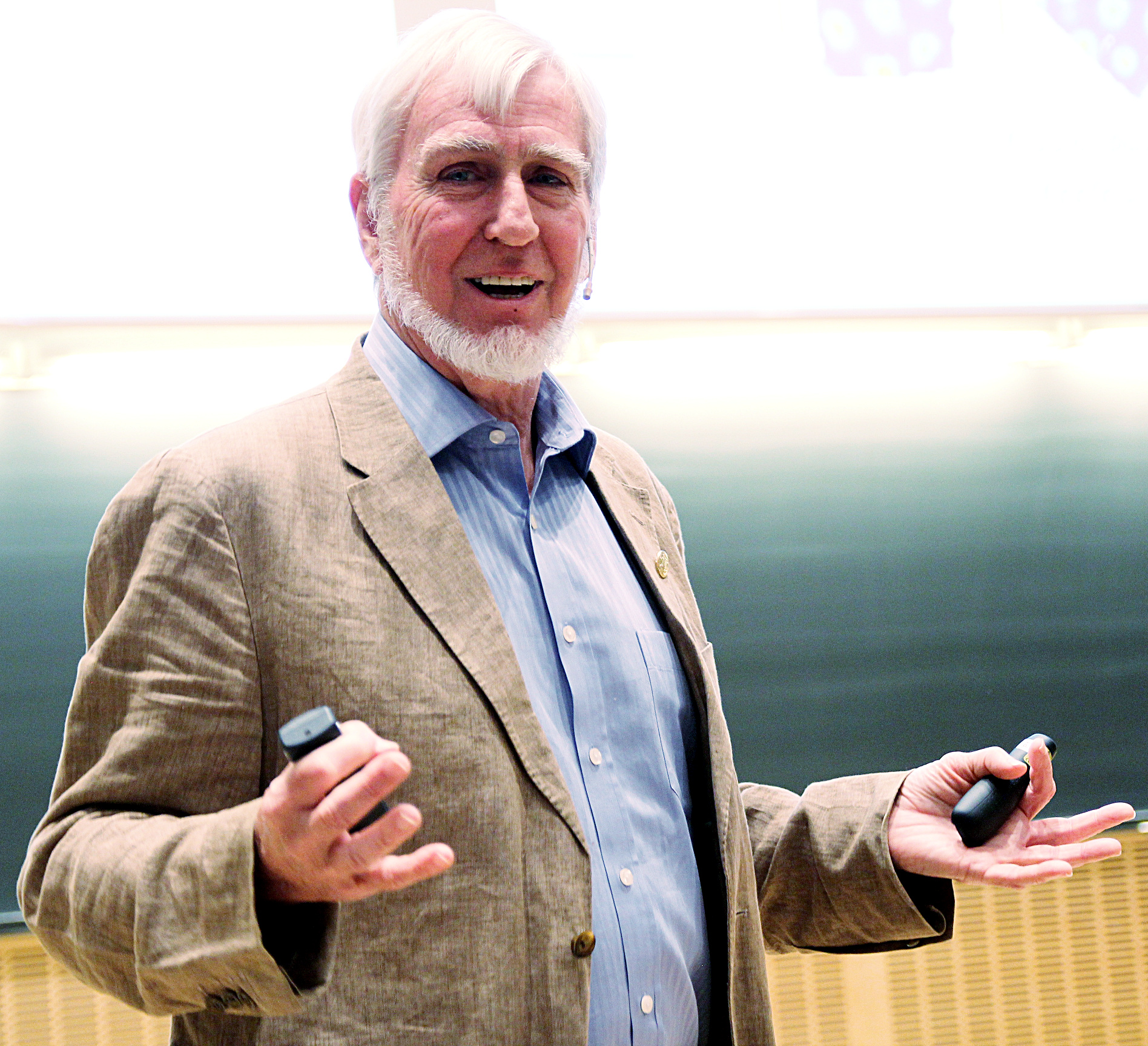
John O'Keefe, UCL neuroscientist and 2014 Nobel laureate for his discovery of place cells

In 2023/24, UCL had an income from research grants and contracts of £538.8 million, making up 26.6% of all revenue. The largest sources of research income were research council grants (£175.9 million) and British charities (£154.2 million). A further £164 million of recurrent research funding was allocated to UCL by Research England, making up 8% of income.

UCL submitted 3,432 staff (3,177 FTEs) across 32 units of assessment (areas of research) to the 2021 Research Excellence Framework (REF) assessment. 58% of submitted research was rated 4* ('world leading'), the sixth highest in the REF, and a further 34% as 3* ('internationally excellent'). Overall, UCL was ranked second for both research power and market share by both Times Higher Education and Research Professional News, and sixth on research quality (GPA) by Times Higher Education. UCL submitted more units of assessment to the 2021 REF than any other university. However, UCL's market share (based on the funding formula) declined from 6.23% following the 2014 REF to 5.34%, despite the overall improvement, reflecting increases in research quality across the sector.

==== Research centres ====
UCL operates a large number of disciplinary-specific research centres in partnership with other research institutions and private enterprises. Notable examples include:

- The London Centre for Nanotechnology (LCN), a multidisciplinary research centre in physical and biomedical nanotechnology based at UCL's campus in Bloomsbury. It is a partnership between UCL, Imperial College London and King's College London. The LCN was established as a joint venture between UCL and Imperial College London in 2003; King's College London joined the LCN in 2018.
- The Centre for the Study of the Legacies of British Slave-ownership, which was established at UCL with the support of the Hutchins Center for African and African American Research at Harvard University. It incorporates two earlier projects: the Legacies of British Slave-ownership project (2009–2012) and the Structure and significance of British Caribbean slave-ownership 1763–1833 project (2013–2015).
- The Sainsbury Wellcome Centre for Neural Circuits and Behaviour (SWC), a neuroscience research centre established at UCL with funding from the Gatsby Charitable Foundation and Wellcome Trust and opened in 2016.

==== Publishing and commercialisation ====
In 2020/21, UCL had an income of £7.3 million from intellectual property and £25.2 million from the sale of shares in spin-off companies. As of 2020/21, UCL had the second largest patent portfolio of any UK university (after Oxford) with 2,391 patents. It granted the third largest number of intellectual property licences (after Oxford and the University of East Anglia), with 2,235.

UCL Business is a technology transfer company which is wholly owned by UCL. It has three main activities: licensing technologies, creating spin-out companies, and project management. UCL Business supports spin-out companies in areas including discovery disclosure, commercialisation, business plan development, contractual advice, incubation support, recruitment of management teams and identification of investors. In the area of licensing technoloiges, the company provides commercial, legal and administrative advice to help companies broker licensing agreements. UCL Business also provides UCL departments and institutes with project management services for single or multi-party collaborative industry projects. The company transferred £11 million of royalty income to UCL in 2023/24 (2022/23: £3.1 million).

Launched in 2015, UCL Press is a new university press wholly owned by UCL. It was the first fully open access university press in the UK, and publishes monographs, textbooks and other academic books in a wide range of academic areas which are available to download for free, in addition to a number of journals. As of December 2024, UCL Press had had more than 13 million downloads of its open access books and journal articles in 242 countries and territories worldwide. More than 10 million of these were for its open access books.

UCL Consultants was established in 2003 as an academic consultancy services company and is a wholly owned subsidiary of UCL.

=== Libraries ===
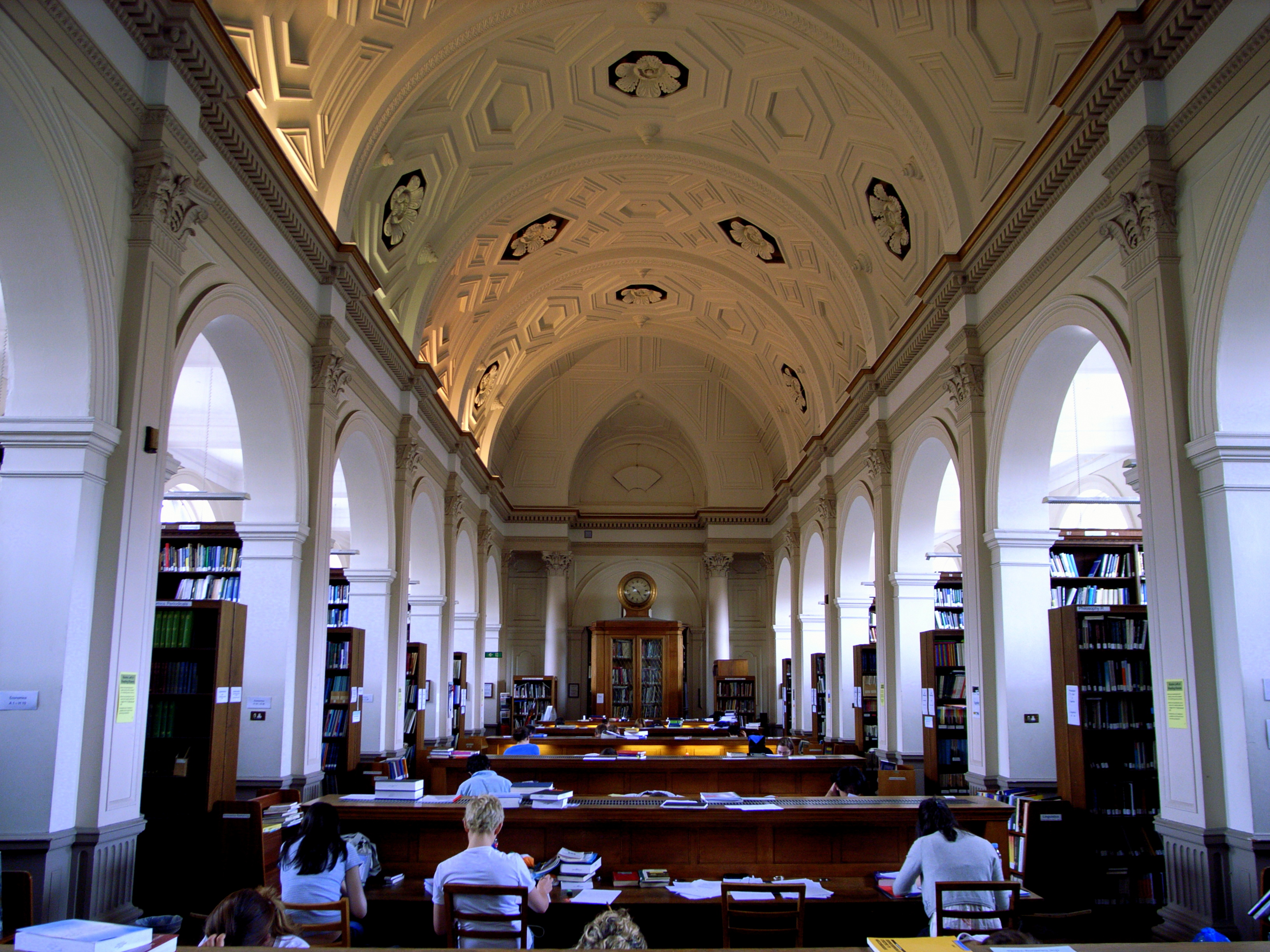
The Donaldson Reading Room, part of UCL's Main Library

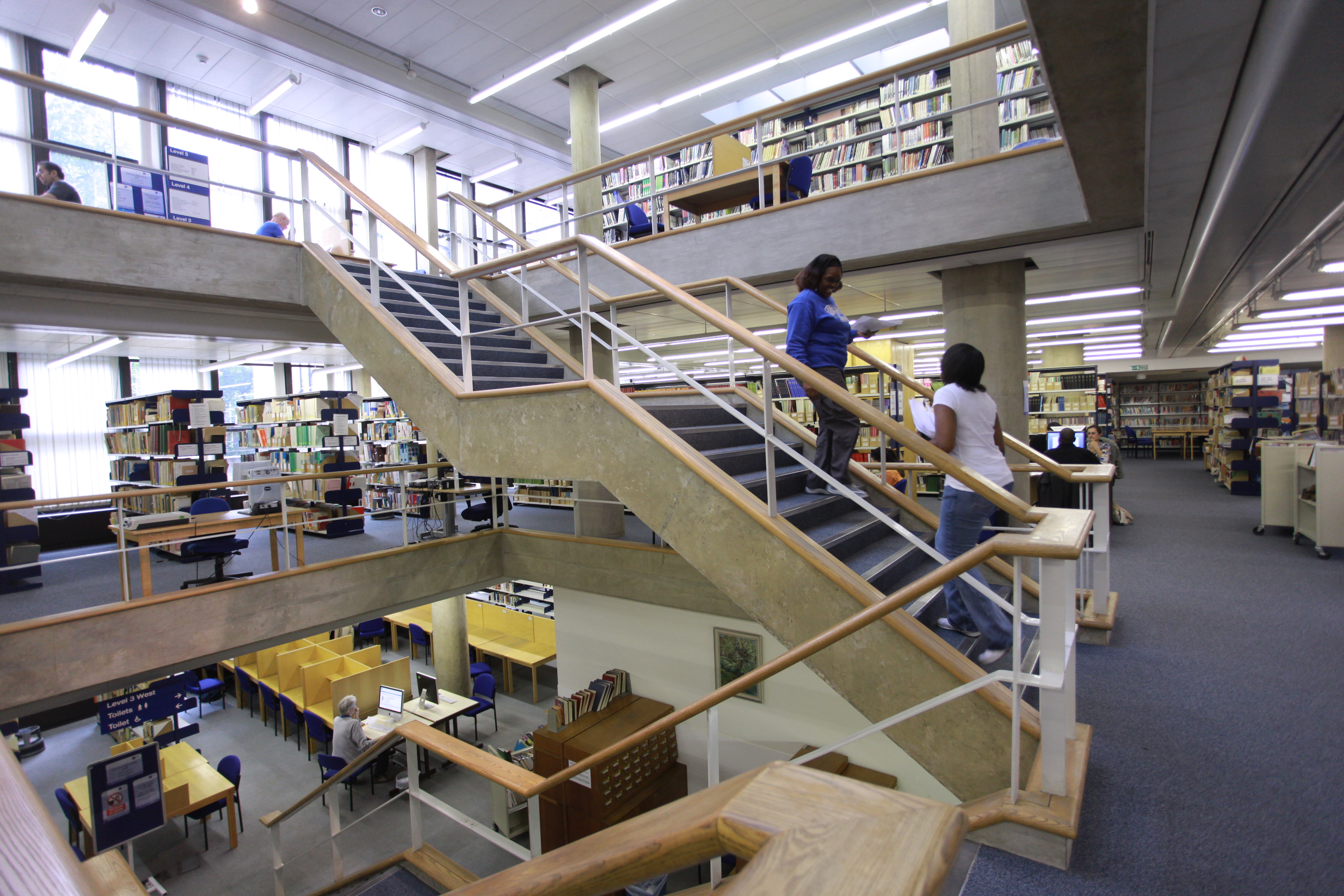
The UCL Institute of Education's Newsam Library, the largest education library in Europe

The UCL library system comprises 18 libraries located across the Bloomsbury and UCL East campuses. The libraries contain a total of over 2 million books. The largest library is the UCL Main Library, which is located in the UCL Main Building and contains collections relating to the arts and humanities, economics, history, law and public policy. The second largest library is the UCL Science Library, which is located in the DMS Watson Building on Malet Place and contains collections relating to anthropology, engineering, geography, life sciences, management and the mathematical and physical sciences. The Cruciform Hub contains books and periodicals in the subjects of clinical medicine and medical science. It holds the combined collections of the former Boldero and Clinical Sciences libraries which developed within the Middlesex Hospital, University College Hospital and Royal Free & University College Medical Schools up until their merger in 2005.

Other libraries include the UCL Bartlett Library (architecture and town planning), the UCL Eastman Dental Institute Library (oral health sciences), the UCL Institute of Archaeology Library (archaeology and egyptology), the UCL Institute of Education's Newsam Library (education and related areas of social science), the UCL Institute of Neurology Rockefeller Medical Library (neurosurgery and neuroscience), the Joint Moorfields Eye Hospital & the UCL Institute of Ophthalmology Library (biomedicine, medicine, nursing, ophthalmology and visual science), the UCL Language & Speech Science Library (audiology, communication disorders, linguistics & phonetics, special education, speech & language therapy and voice) and the UCL School of Slavonic and East European Studies Library (the economics, geography, history, languages, literature and politics of Eastern Europe). The newest library is the UCL East Library, located on the second floor of Marshgate. Uniquely among UCL libraries, it offers a 'click and collect' service allowing books from any UCL library to be delivered to UCL East rather than having to be picked up from the library that holds them, but does not hold any collections on-site.

UCL staff and students have full access to the main libraries of the University of London – the Senate House Library and the libraries of the institutes of the School of Advanced Study – which are located close to the main UCL campus in Bloomsbury. These libraries contain over 3.7 million books and focus on the arts, humanities and social sciences. The British Library, which contains around 14 million books, is also located close to the main UCL campus and all UCL students and staff can apply for reference access.

UCL's open access institutional repository, UCL Discovery, and UCL Press, UCL's open access academic press are managed by UCL Library Services.

==== Special collections ====
UCL's Special Collections contains UCL's collection of historical or culturally significant works. It holds over 150,000 rare books, including 179 incunabula, as well as over 600 collections of archives and manuscripts. The incunabula include a 1477 edition of Dante's Divine Comedy, and a 1493 edition of the Nuremberg Chronicle donated by Jeremy Bentham.

UCL's most significant works are housed in three strong rooms. The special collection includes first editions of Isaac Newton's Principia, Charles Darwin's On the Origin of Species and James Joyce's Ulysses.

=== Museums ===
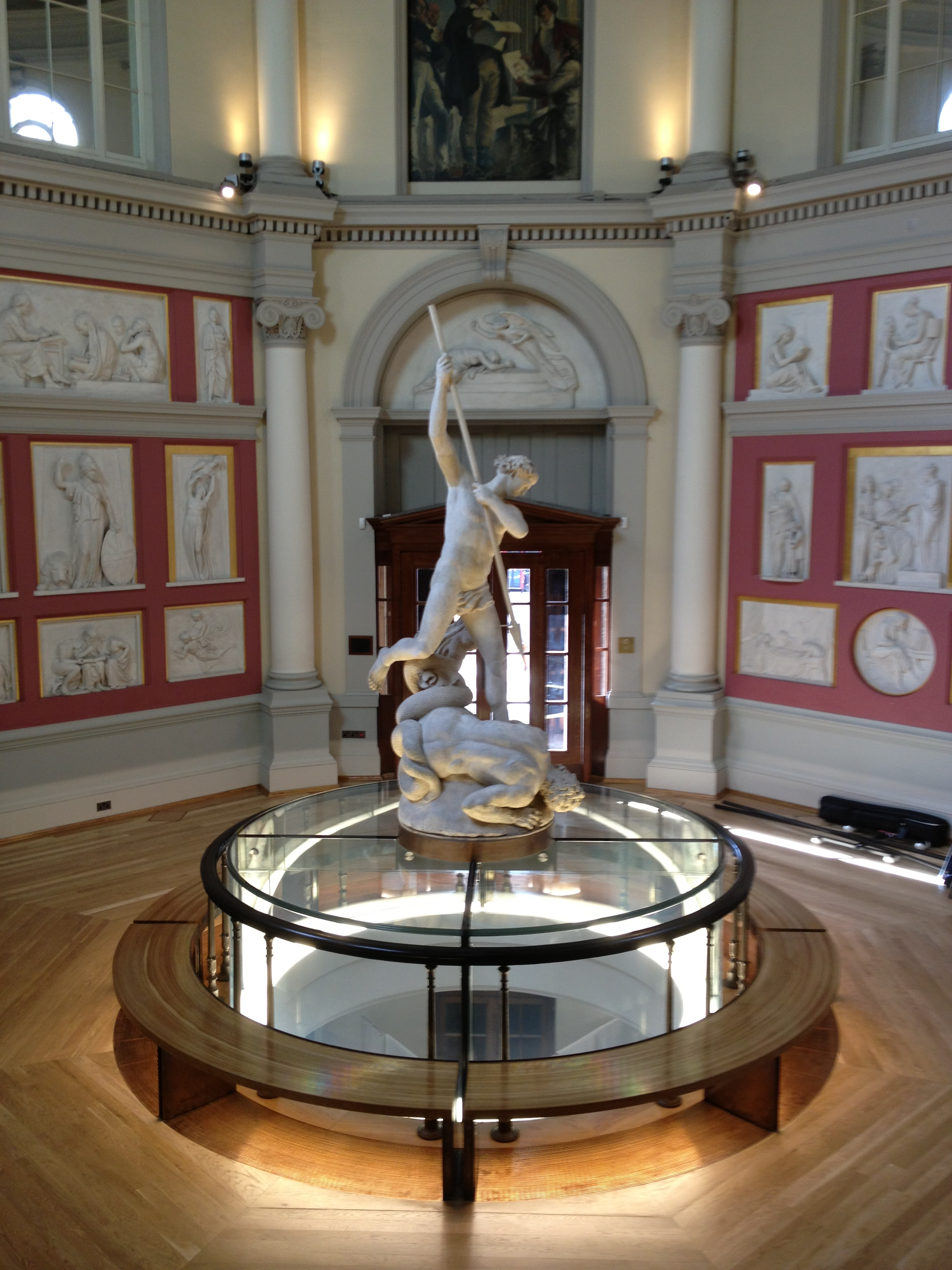
The Flaxman Gallery

UCL is responsible for several museums and collections in a wide range of fields across the arts and sciences, including:

- Petrie Museum of Egyptian Archaeology: Founded in 1892 by a donation from Amelia Edwards of several hundred Egyptian items, the museum now contains around 80,000 items and covers the history of the Nile valley from prehistoric times through to the Islamic period. It is named after William Flinders Petrie, the first Edwards Professor at UCL, who excavated dozens of sites in his career and sold his collection to the college in 1913. The Petrie Museum is a designated collection under the Arts Council England Designation Scheme for "pre-eminent collections held in museums, libraries and archives across England".
- UCL Art Museum: the art collection originated as a teaching and research collection for the Slade, and contains works by women artists dating back to the 1890s. A series of plaster casts of full-size details of sculptures by John Flaxman is located inside the library under the dome of the UCL Main Building. It was announced in 2024 that this would be closed to allow the area to become a flexible event space, with the objects placed in storage until a new gallery could be provided elsewhere.
- Grant Museum of Zoology and Comparative Anatomy: Established in 1827 by Robert Edmund Grant, UCL's first professor of comparative anatomy and zoology, for teaching purposes. Grant bequeathed his collection of 10,000 specimens to UCL upon his death. With other additions, the museum now contains around 68,000 specimens, including dodo bones and a rare quagga skeleton.

=== Reputation and rankings ===
Rankings
National rankings
- Complete (2027): 13=
- Guardian (2027): 13
- Times / Sunday Times (2027): 14

Global rankings
- ARWU (2026): 17
- QS (2027): 8
- THE (2026): 22

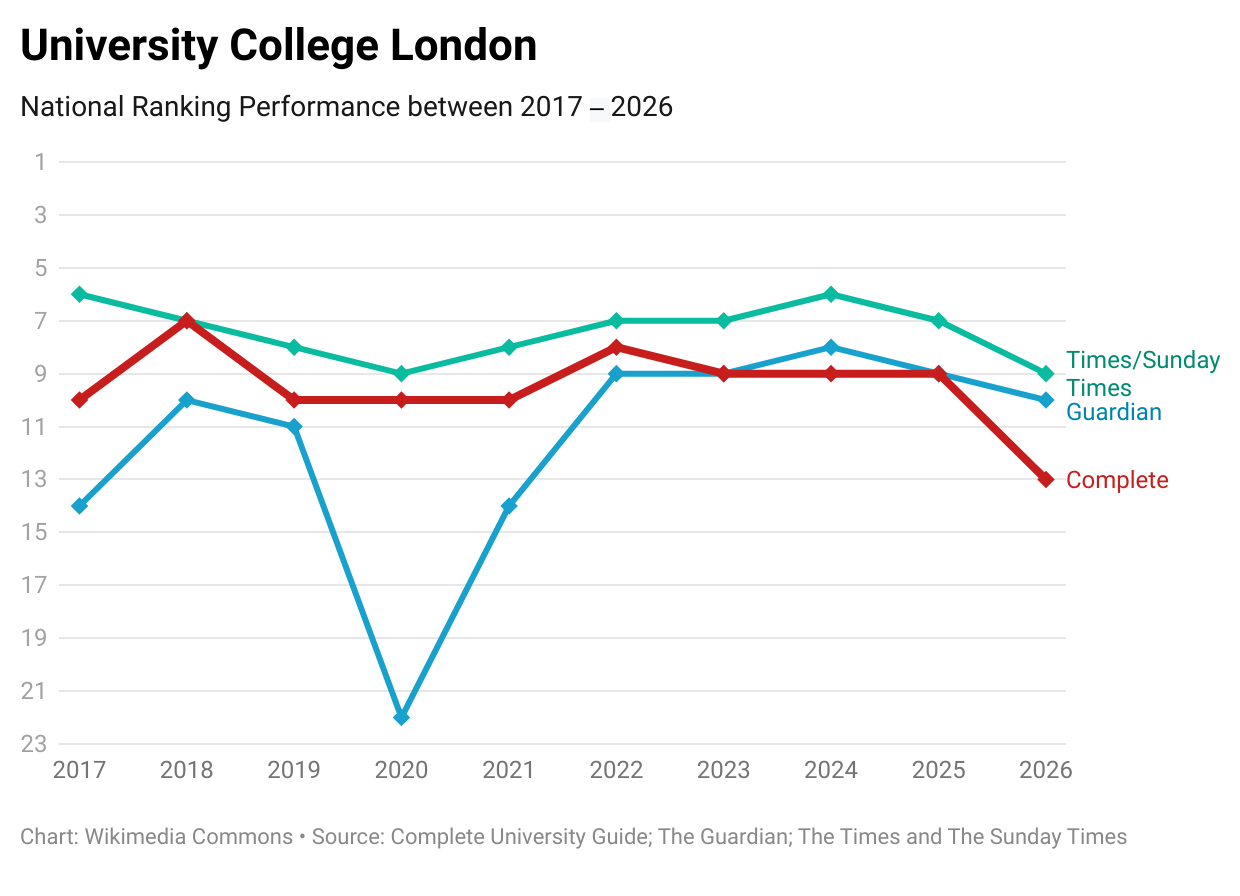
University College London's national league table performance over the past ten years

National

UCL is ranked as one of the top fifteen universities in all three of the main UK university league tables. These place more emphasis on teaching and student experience than global rankings, using criteria such as teaching quality and learning resources, entry standards, employment prospects, research quality and drop-out rates. It went through a dip in rankings in the mid 2010s, particularly in The Guardian University Guide, but returned to that publication's top ten in the 2022 rankings, when its ninth position was its best result since 2014.

In the 2023 Complete University Guide subject tables, UCL was ranked in the top ten in 34 subjects out of 42 offered (81%). It was ranked top for American studies, linguistics, speech and language therapy, and architecture.

In the 2023 Guardian University Guide subject tables, UCL is ranked top in construction, surveying and planning. It was ranked in the top ten for 21 of 31 subjects offered (68%).

UCL is ranked top in the 2023 Times/Sunday Times Good University Guide for American studies, building, information systems and management, liberal arts, and town and country planning. It is ranked in the top ten for 31 of 44 subjects offered (70%). The 2023 Good University Guide also ranked UCL 98th in their social inclusion ranking (covering England and Wales). UCL was named University of the Year in the Times/Sunday Times Good University Guide for 2024.

Analysis by the Department for Education in 2018, found that UCL had an impact on earnings of graduates five years after graduation of +15.5% for women (7th highest impact) and +16.2% for men (10th highest impact) compared to average graduates with similar background characteristics (prior attainment, socio-economic status, etc.) and subject choice.

Global

UCL has been consistently ranked in the top 25 of the three major global rankings published over 2013 to 2022, including being in the top ten of the QS World University Rankings over the whole of that period.

In the 2025 Academic Ranking of World Universities, UCL was ranked 14th in the world, having been placed between 15th and 21st in the rankings from 2013 to 2024.

In the 2023 QS World University Rankings (published 2022), UCL was ranked 8th in the world. It has ranked between 4th and 10th in the 2014 to 2024 league tables.

In the Times Higher Education World University Rankings 2023 (published 2022), UCL was ranked 22nd in the world, having ranked between 14th and 22nd in the 2014 to 2023 tables. In the Times Higher Education World Reputation Rankings 2022, UCL was ranked 25th, while in the Times Higher Education Impact Rankings 2022 it was ranked 101–200.

In the 2024–2025 U.S. News & World Report Best Global Universities Ranking, UCL was ranked joint 7th in the world.

== Admissions ==
UCAS Admission Statistics
	2025	2024	2023	2022	2021
Applications (Note: Main scheme applications, International and UK)	89,680	78,330	77,615	74,775	68,085
Accepted	11,470	9,115	7,595	7,530	8,140
Applications/Accepted Ratio	7.8	8.6	10.2	9.9	8.4
Overall Offer Rate (%)	44.2	34.5	25.9	29.4	36.1
↳ UK only (%) (Note: UK domiciled applicants)	39.5	35.2	27.1	29.6	42.8
Average Entry Tariff	—N/a	—N/a	165	173	190
↳ Top three exams (Note: The maximum tariff score for three exams is 168: the equivalent of A*A*A* at A-Level, 777 at HL for the IB Diploma Programme, or AAA at Advanced Higher)	—N/a	—N/a	153.7	157.9	159.2

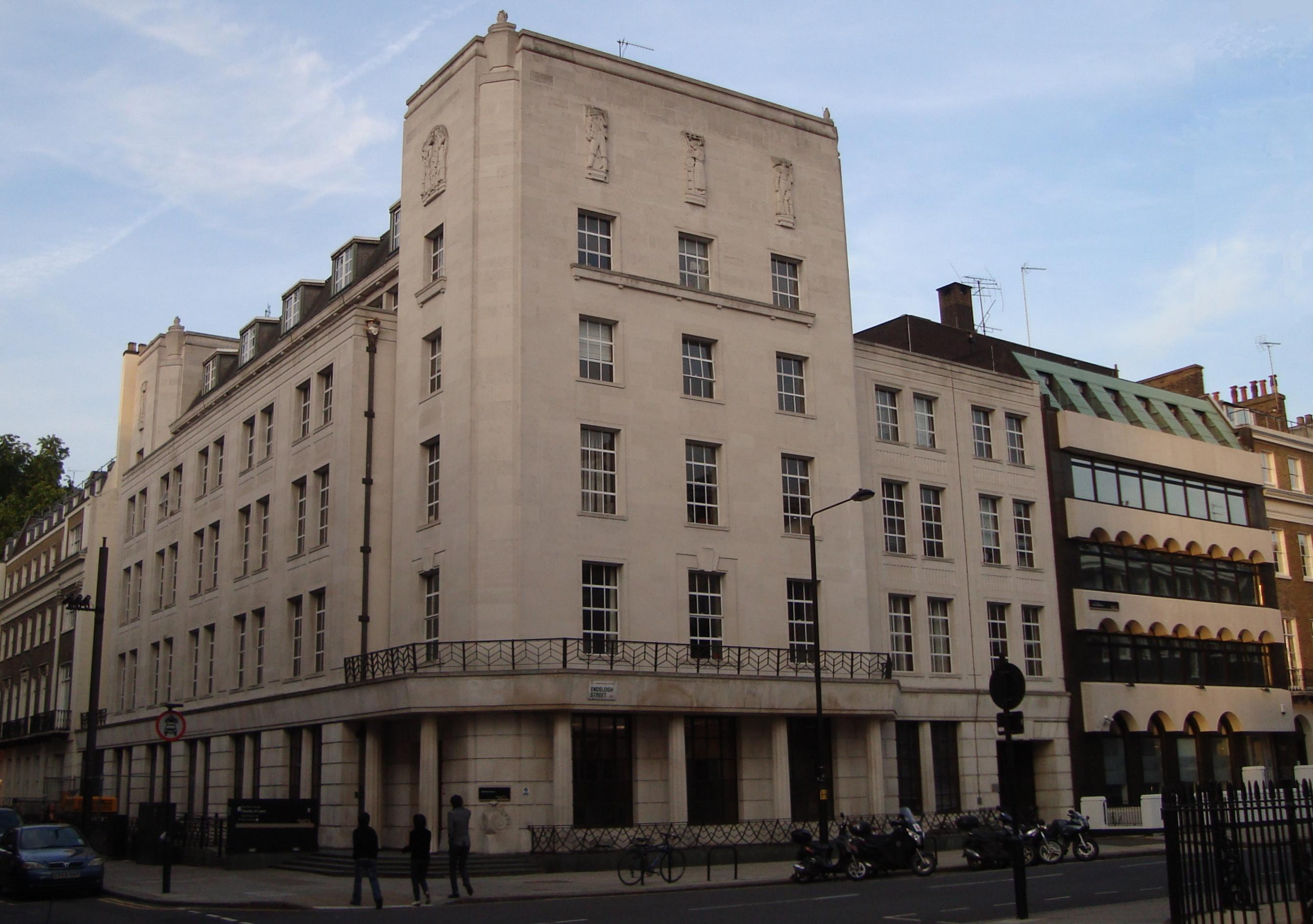
Bentham House, the main building of the UCL Faculty of Laws

In the 2024/25 academic year, the student body consisted of 51,315 students, composed of 25,705 undergraduates and 25,610 postgraduate students. The university is consistently designated as a 'high-tariff' institution by the Department for Education, with the average undergraduate entrant to the university in recent years amassing between 153–159 UCAS Tariff points in their top three pre-university qualifications – the equivalent of A*AA to A*A*A at A-Level. Based on 2022/23 HESA entry standards data published in domestic league tables, which include a broad range of qualifications beyond the top three exam grades, the average student at UCL achieved 173 points – the 12th highest in the country. According to a Freedom of Information request response, UCL's offer rate for 2021 admission was 36.1% at undergraduate level and 23.5% at postgraduate level across all applicants.

International students have made up the majority of main-scheme applicants to UCL since 2015 and the majority of acceptances since 2017. The ratio of main-scheme applicants to acceptances in 2022 was 10.3 for UK applicants and 9.9 for international applicants. Within the UK, UCL is a local recruiter, with 47.4% of 2022 UK admissions coming from the London region and a further 28.1% from the adjacent East of England and South East regions.

Of UCL's young UK domiciled undergraduates, 32.7% were privately educated in 2019–20, the eighth highest proportion amongst mainstream British universities.

Undergraduate law applicants are required to take the National Admissions Test for Law and undergraduate medical applicants are required to take the University Clinical Aptitude Test. Applicants for Computer Science, Management Science, and social science courses including European Social and Political Studies and Sociology are required to take the Test of Academic Reasoning for Admissions (TARA). Medicine, pharmacy and English also interview undergraduate applicants prior to making an offer of admission.

=== Widening access ===
HESA Student Body Composition (2024/25)
Domicile and Ethnicity	Total
British White (Note: Not be confused solely with White British)	23%
British Ethnic Minorities (Note: Includes those who indicate that they identify as Asian, Black, Mixed Heritage, Arab or any other ethnicity except White.)	25%
International EU	5%
International Non-EU	47%
Undergraduate Widening Participation Indicators
Female	58%
Independent School	16%
Low Participation Areas (Note: Calculated from the Polar4 measure, using Quintile1, in England and Wales. Calculated from the Scottish Index of Multiple Deprivation (SIMD) measure, using SIMD20, in Scotland.)	5%

UCL runs a contextual offer scheme called Access UCL, whereby eligible applicants can receive conditional offers for courses at UCL that have lower requirements than the standard conditional offers for those courses. Eligibility for Access UCL can be through an applicant living in a deprived areas or an area with low participation in higher education, through having spent time in care, though being a young adult carer, or through being estranged from their family. Applicants must have attended a state school, unless they have spent time in care. Mature applicants are assessed on the same criteria, and are additionally not eligible if they have completed or are on the final year of an undergraduate degree. While the scheme enables applicants from disadvantaged backgrounds to receive contextual offers, it does not guarantee that an offer will be made. Contextual offers vary by course. For example, a contextual offer for the law LLB reduces the requirement from A*AA to BBB at A level, but for the physics MSci from A*AA to AAB.

UCL also runs week-long UCL Summer Schools for high-achieving students from disadvantaged backgrounds in partnership with the Sutton Trust. These give participants the opportunity to explore London, to develop skills in their chosen subject, to improve their university applications through personal statement workshops and talks by admissions tutors, and to take part in social activities.

In 2023, UCL launched an integrated engineering foundation year programme based at UCL East for disadvantaged students who do not meet the standard entry requirements for the Faculty of Engineering's undergraduate degrees. Candidates must have attended UK state schools for A levels or equivalent (unless they have experienced forced displacement) and have experienced specific socioeconomic or personal circumstances such as time in care, estrangement, forced displacement, or receipt of free school meals. The programme's academic entry requirements are based on UCAS Tariff points rather than letter grades.

The university runs intensive one-year foundation courses, called Undergraduate Preparatory Certificates, in either sciences or humanities, for international students who do not meet the university's requirements for admission.

For UK domiciled young full-time undergraduate entrants in 2020/21, 67.6% came from state schools, significantly below the location-adjusted benchmark of 74.5%, and 4.3% came from low participation neighbourhoods, not significantly different from the location-adjusted benchmark of 4.0%. For UK-domiciled undergraduate entrants in 2022/23, UCAS data shows no significant difference in offer rate with ethnicity or gender. Applicants from the 20% of neighbourhoods with the lowest rates of participation in higher education receive offers at a rate 4.9% higher than would be expected based on their subject choice and predicted grades alone, a statistically significant difference, accounting for 6.3% of all offers. The offer rate for applicants from the 20% of neighbourhoods with the lowest rates of participation in higher education is not significantly different from that expected, with applicants from those neighbourhoods accounting for 48.9% of all offers.

== Student life ==
=== Students' union ===
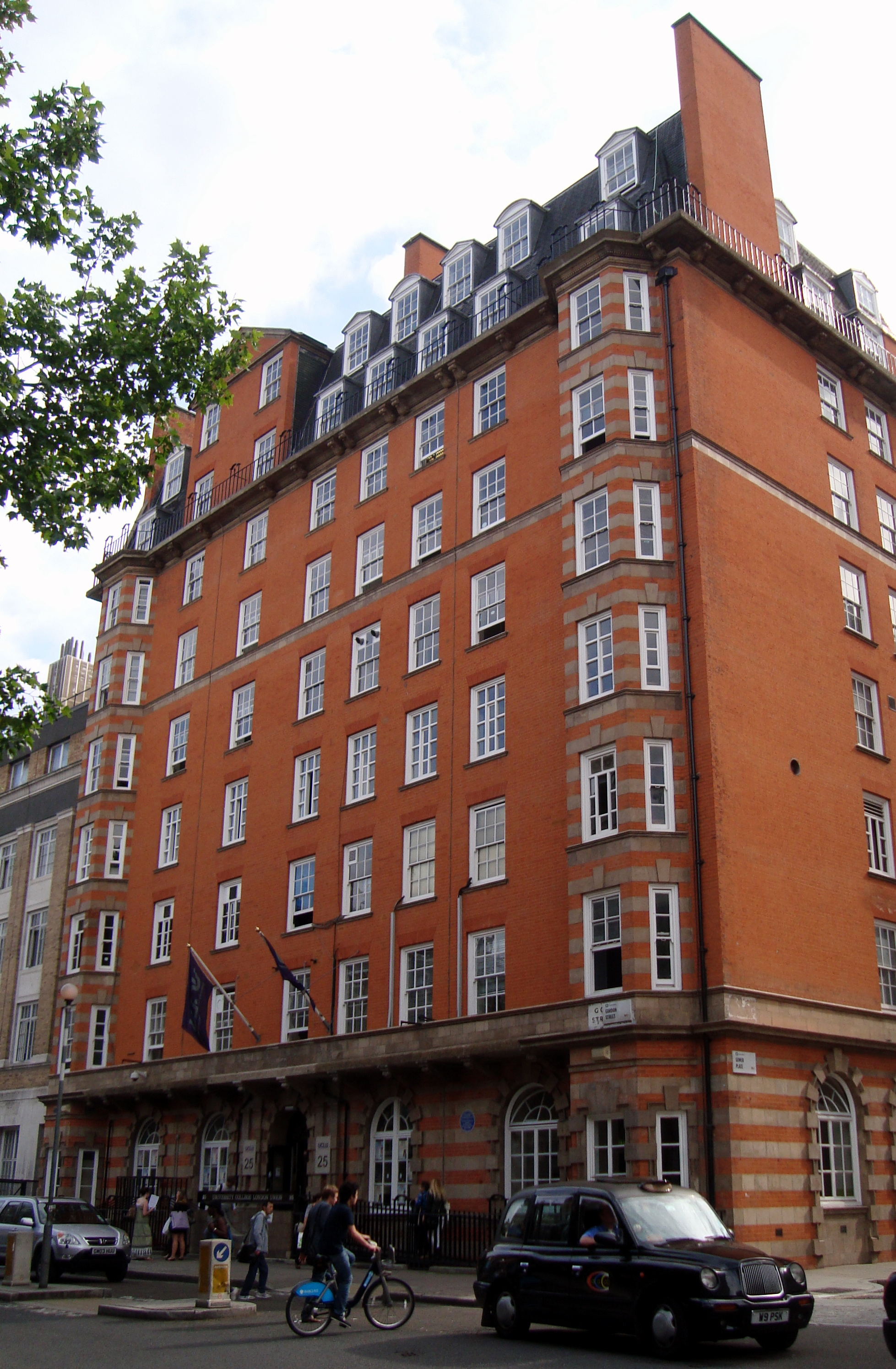
Students' union building on Gordon Street

Founded in 1893, Students' Union UCL, formerly the UCL Union, is one of the oldest students' unions in England, although postdating the Liverpool Guild of Students which formed a student representative council in 1892. Students' Union UCL operates both as the representative voice for UCL students, and as a provider of a wide range of services. It is democratically controlled through General Meetings and referendums, and is run by elected student officers. The union also supports a range of services, including numerous clubs and societies, sports facilities, an advice service, and a number of bars, cafes and shops.

As of 2021, there are over 250 clubs and societies under the umbrella of the UCL Union. These include: UCL Snowsports (one of the largest sports society at UCL, responsible for organising the annual UCL ski trip), Pi Media (responsible for Pi Magazine and Pi Newspaper, UCL's official student publications), the Debating Society (established 1829), and the UCL Union Film Society, with past members including Christopher Nolan.

=== Faith ===
From its foundation the college has been deliberately secular; the initial justification for this was that it would enable students of different Christian traditions (specifically Roman Catholics, Anglicans and Nonconformists) to study alongside each other without conflict. In order to cater to people of all faiths, UCL opened a prayer room (with attached ablution facilities) and a silent meditation room in the student centre in February 2019, and there is a quiet contemplation room behind 16–26 Gordon Square. There is also a Christian chaplain (who also serves as interfaith advisor) and there are student societies for most major religions.

=== Sport ===
The union runs over 70 sports clubs, including the UCL Cricket Club (Men's and Women's), UCL Boat Club (Men's and Women's clubs), UCL Running, Athletics and Cross Country Club, Polo, and UCL Rugby Club (Men's and Women's), as well as RUMS sports clubs for medical students (from Royal Free, University College and Middlesex, the three medical schools that merged into UCL).

UCL clubs compete in inter-university fixtures in the British Universities and Colleges Sport (BUCS) competition in a range of sports, including athletics, basketball, cricket, fencing, football, hockey, netball, rugby union and tennis. In the 2021/22 season, UCL finished in 16th position in the final BUCS rankings.

UCL sports facilities include a fitness centre at the main UCL campus in Bloomsbury and a 90-acre (36 ha) athletics ground in Shenley, Hertfordshire, part of which is used as the Watford Football Club Training Ground. It also exercises effective control over Somers Town Community Sports Centre, with the power to appoint five of the nine trustees. The sports centre includes a six-court sports hall, as well as an activity/dance studio and an all-weather outdoor multi-use games area.

==== Polo ====
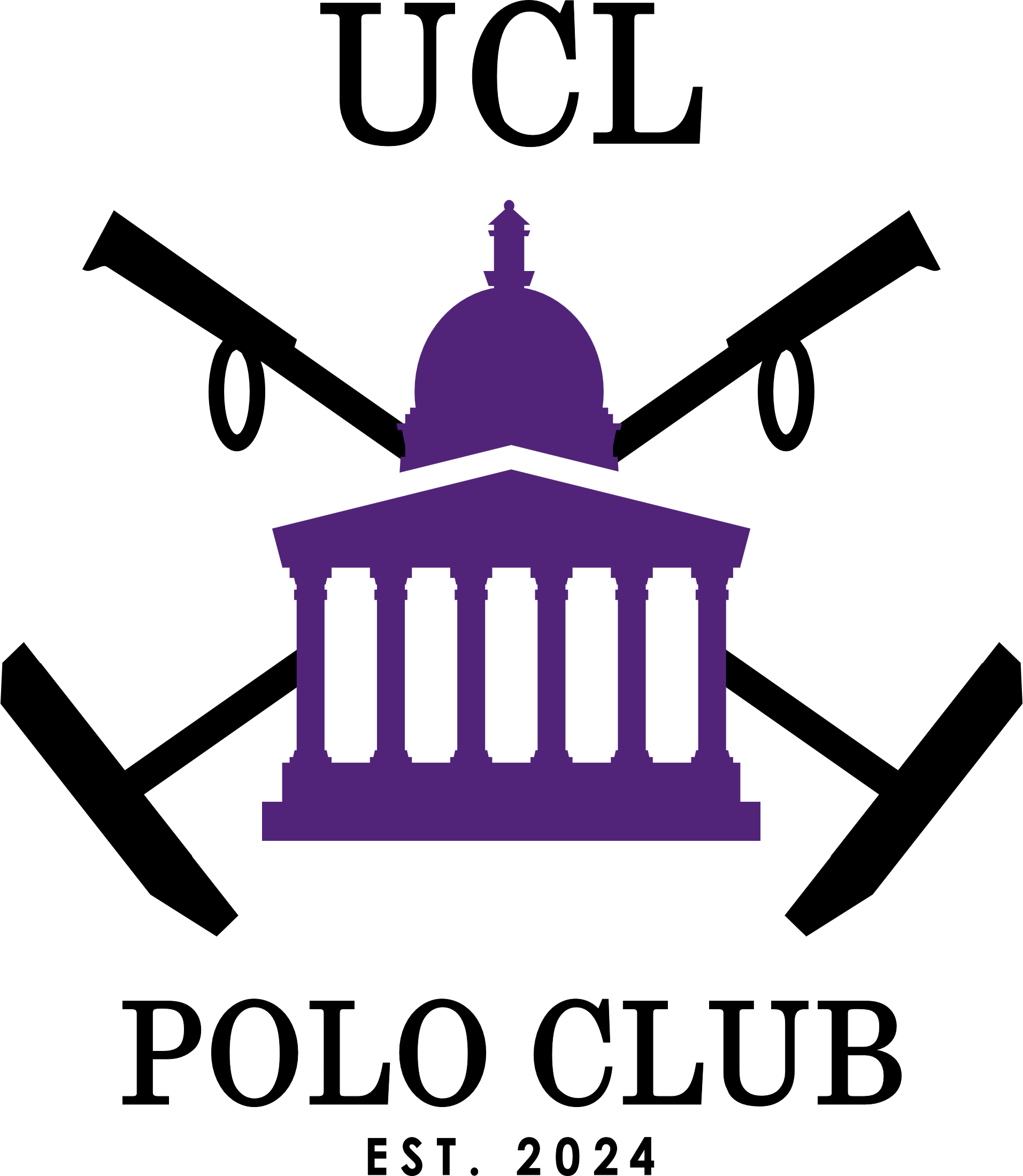
University College London Polo Club

University College London Polo Club (commonly UCL Polo Club) is a student polo club that attends major horse racing events such as Ascot and visits polo events including Guards Polo Club.

=== Mascot ===
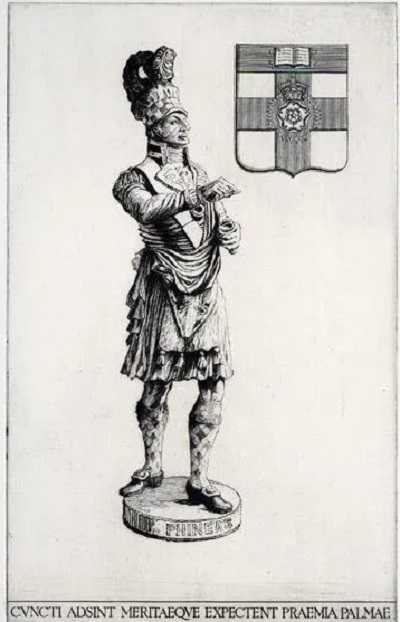
Pencil signed etching of Phineas Maclino

The UCL mascot was Phineas MacLino, or Phineas, a wooden tobacconist's sign of a kilted Jacobite Highlander stolen from outside a shop in Tottenham Court Road during the celebrations of the relief of Ladysmith, part of the Second Boer War, in March 1900. In 1922, Phineas was stolen by students from King's, marking the start of 'mascotry', leading to an hour-long battle and the eventual return of Phineas. In 1993, the students' union's centenary year, Phineas was placed in the third floor bar of 25 Gordon Street and the bar named after him. In 2019, the students' union voted to remove the mascot from the bar due to its links to imperialism and British colonialism.

=== Rivalry with King's College London ===
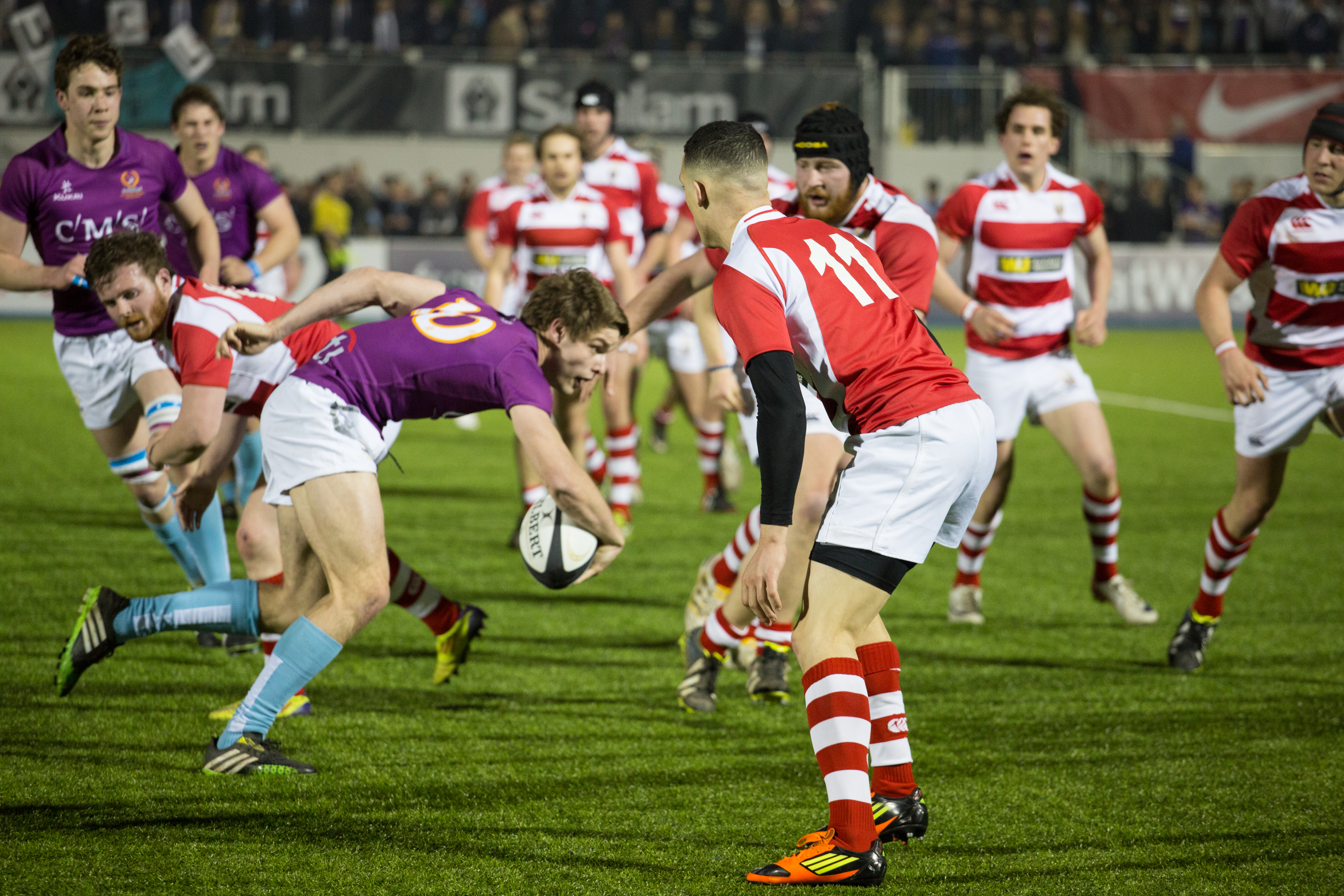
A UCL player attacks in his team's 2014 Varsity victory. UCL's traditional rivalry with King's College is nowadays most noticeable at the annual varsity rugby game.

UCL has a long-running, mostly friendly rivalry with King's College London, but there were frequent clashes in the interwar period which have historically been known as "rags". UCL students have been referred to by students from King's as the "Godless Scum of Gower Street", in reference to a comment made at the founding of King's, which was based on Christian principles. UCL students in turn referred to King's as "Strand Polytechnic".

In 1922 Phineas, the UCL mascot was kidnapped by King's students, leading to a pitched battle in the King's College quad as UCL students recovered their mascot. Shortly after this, King's adopted their own mascot – initially a large papier-mâché beer bottle, soon replaced by Reggie the Lion. During the 1927 rag, Reggie was captured by UCL students and his body filled with rotten apples. During the same year, an attempt by King's students to capture Phineas led to the "Battle of Gower Street", caught on camera by British Pathé. On another occasion, Reggie was castrated by UCL students.

King's students stole the embalmed head of Jeremy Bentham in October 1975, only returning it after UCL paid a ransom to charity. The head is now kept in the UCL vaults.

=== Student campaigns ===
In 1956, UCL students organised a silent march progressing against the Soviet oppression of the Hungarian Revolution of 1956. Around 1,300 students from across institutions in London matches from the Royal Albert Hall to the Soviet Embassy. There were active Campaign for Nuclear Disarmament and anti-apartheid students groups at UCL in the 1960s and a pioneering GaySoc group that helped drive the National Union of Students gay rights campaign in the 1970s. 1977 saw a student occupation of administrative offices and the Slade School in protest against government cuts to higher education.

In 2010, protests by students and staff led UCL to promise to pay a living wage to all UCL staff. As part of the protests against the UK government's plans to increase student fees, around 200 students occupied the Jeremy Bentham Room and part of the Slade School of Fine Art for over two weeks during November and December 2010. The university successfully obtained a court order to evict the students but stated that it did not intend to enforce the order if possible.

The late 2010s saw student campaigns around the cost of university-run accommodation. In 2016, over 1000 students took part in a rent strike in protest against high rents and poor conditions. Organisers said they had won over £1 million in rent cuts, freezes and grants from UCL in the settlement that ended the strike. Another rent strike in 2017 lead to UCL pledging around £1.4 million in bursaries and rent freezes, mostly in the form of accommodation bursaries for less well-off students totalling £600,000 per year for the 2017/18 and 2018/19 academic years. Another rent strike was held at two halls of residence in the third term of the 2017/18 academic year due to complaints over conditions at those halls.

In 2018, Aliza Ayaz, then a first year student founded the university’s first environment student campaign by setting up the Climate Action Society. The student society led pressure on the university to divest from fossil fuels and make the announcement publicly.

In 2024, students protesting against the Gaza war set up an encampment in the campus, emulating the 2024 pro-Palestinian protests that took place across universities in the United States. The UCL encampment followed similar movements by students in other UK universities, such as the University of Leeds and the University of Bristol. On 15 November 2024, students protested the visit of Czech Foreign Minister Jan Lipavský, criticising the Czech government's support for Israel.

== Student body ==
UCL student body 2021/22
1. UK undergrad (23.5%)
2. Int undergrad (27.3%)
3. UK taught postgrad (17.4%)
4. Int taught postgrad (18.7%)
5. UK research postgrad (7.50%)
6. Int research postgrad (5.60%)

Student body composition (2021/22)
Domicile and ethnicity (Note: HESA only collects ethnicity information for UK domiciled students.)
British – white	25.6%
British – Asian	12.8%
British – Black	3.1%
British – mixed heritage	3.7%
British – other/unknown	3.2%
International – European Union	9.4%
International – China	23.0%
International – rest of Asia	10.7%
International – rest of the world	8.4%
Gender
Female	60.8%
Male	39.1%
Other	0.1%
Age
30 and over	12.1%
25–29	13.8%
21–24	34.8%
20 and under	39.3%

In the 2021/22 academic year, UCL had a total of 46,830 students, of whom 23,800 were undergraduates (11,000 UK, 12,800 international), 16,910 were taught postgraduates (8,160 UK, 8,745 international) and 6,120 were research postgraduates (3,520 UK, 2,600 international). In that year, UCL had the second-largest total number of students of any university in the United Kingdom (after the Open University) and the largest number of postgraduate students; however, in terms of UK undergraduates it was 68th by size. It had been the UK university with the highest number of international students every year since 2014/15.

In 2021/22, 87% of UCL's students were full-time and 13% part-time, although among undergraduates only 3% were part-time. The student body was split 60.8% female, 39.1% male and 0.1% other gender identity. 24,145 UCL students (52%) were from outside the UK, of whom 15,795 were from Asia, 4,400 from the European Union, 1,440 from North America, 890 from elsewhere in Europe, 790 from the Middle East, 370 from Africa, 310 from South America, and 155 from Australasia; 45% of overseas students at UCL – 10,785 – came from China. Additionally, UCL had 895 students studying wholly overseas in 2021/22 (10 undergraduate, 785 taught postgraduate and 80 research postgraduate) that are not included in the count of the student population.

For UK domiciled students, UCL's student body in 2021/22 was 52.9% white, 26.4% Asian, 7.6% mixed, 6.4% black and 4.6% other, compared to an average across London institutions of 47.8% white, 22.2% Asian, 6.7% mixed, 15.5% black and 4.9% other. Over the whole student body, 12.5% had a known disability, compared to 15.8% across all institutions.

=== Diversity ===
UCL holds an institutional silver Athena SWAN award. It gained its first institutional award (bronze) in 2006 and was promoted to silver in 2015. As of November 2021, 21 departments across UCL hold bronze awards, 17 hold silver awards and three hold gold awards. UCL also holds an institutional bronze Race Equality Charter award, which it first gained in 2015.

UCL was formerly a member of Stonewall Diversity Champions scheme, promoting LGBT+ equality. It left in February 2020 as a cost-cutting measure and then controversially decided in late 2021 not to rejoin, against the advice of its equality diversity and inclusion committee, following a vote of the academic board that expressed fears that membership of the scheme could inhibit academic freedom. The decision not to rejoin was strongly opposed by staff and student LGBT+ groups at UCL and by the students' union.

== Notable people ==
UCL alumni include Francis Crick (co-discoverer of the structure of DNA), Lord Herschell (Lord Chancellor of Great Britain), William Stanley Jevons (an early pioneer of modern economics), Charles K. Kao ("Godfather of broadband") and Joseph Lister (pioneer in the use of antiseptics in surgery). Notable former staff include Hugh Gaitskell (leader of the Labour Party 1955–63), Otto Hahn (pioneer of nuclear chemistry, discoverer of nuclear fusion and Nobel laureate), Peter Higgs (proposer of the Higgs mechanism, which predicted the existence of the Higgs boson, and Nobel laureate), A. E. Housman (classical scholar and poet, who wrote A Shropshire Lad while a professor at UCL), Sir William Ramsay (discoverer of all of the naturally occurring noble gases) and Klaus Roth (mathematician and Field's Medal winner).

Nobel Prizes have been awarded to 33 UCL academics (including visiting academics) and alumni (16 in Physiology or Medicine, eight in Chemistry, six in Physics, two in Economic Sciences and one in Literature) as well as three Fields Medals in Mathematics.

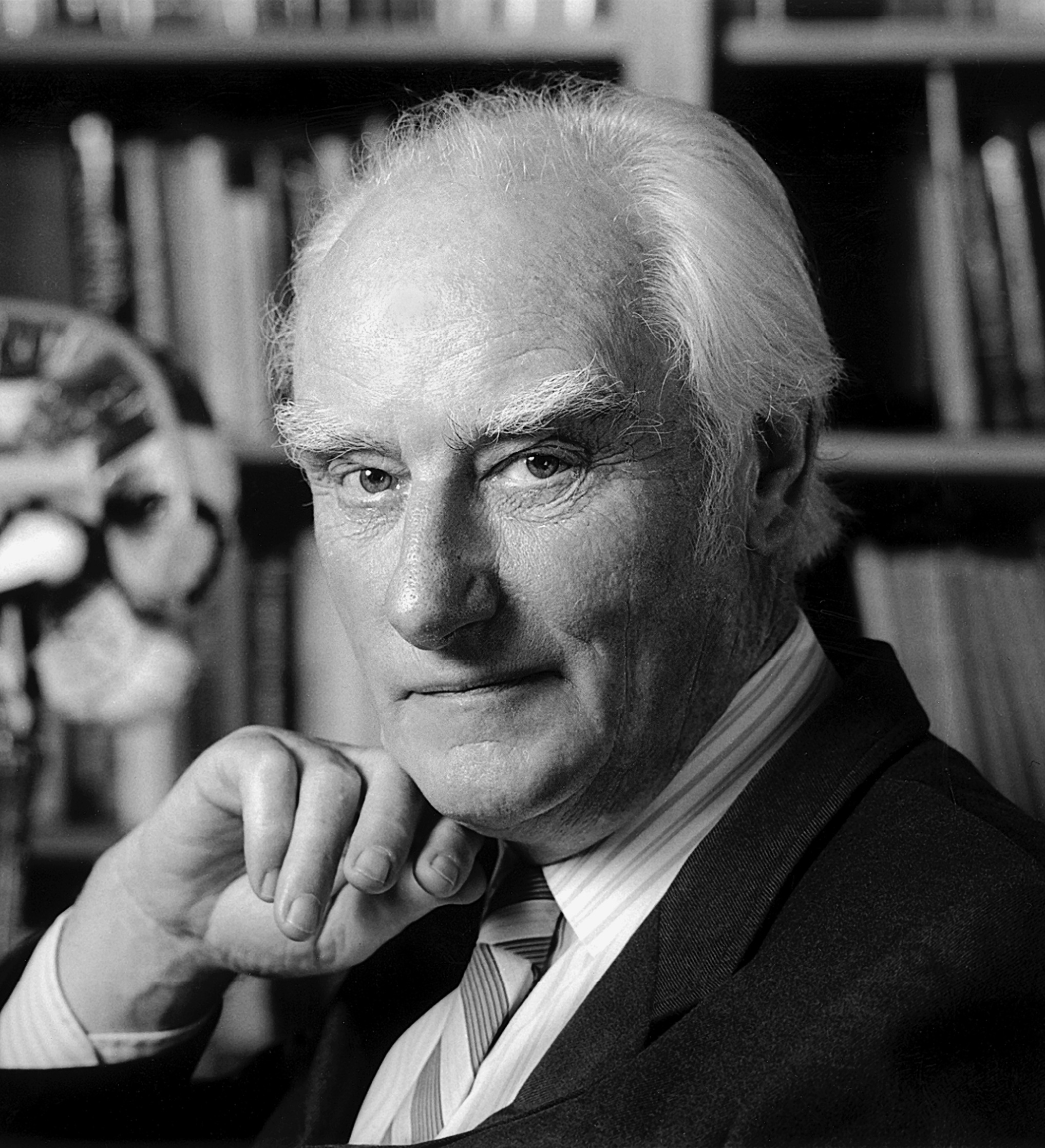
Francis Crick

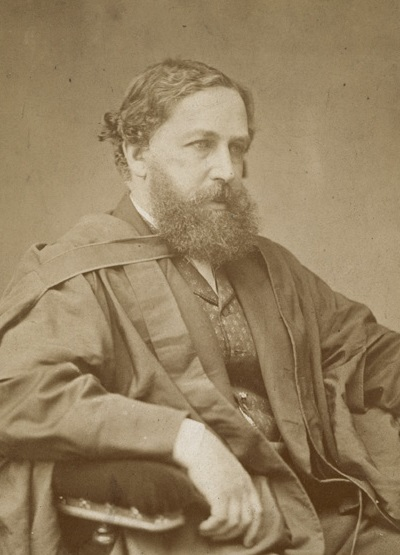
William Stanley Jevons

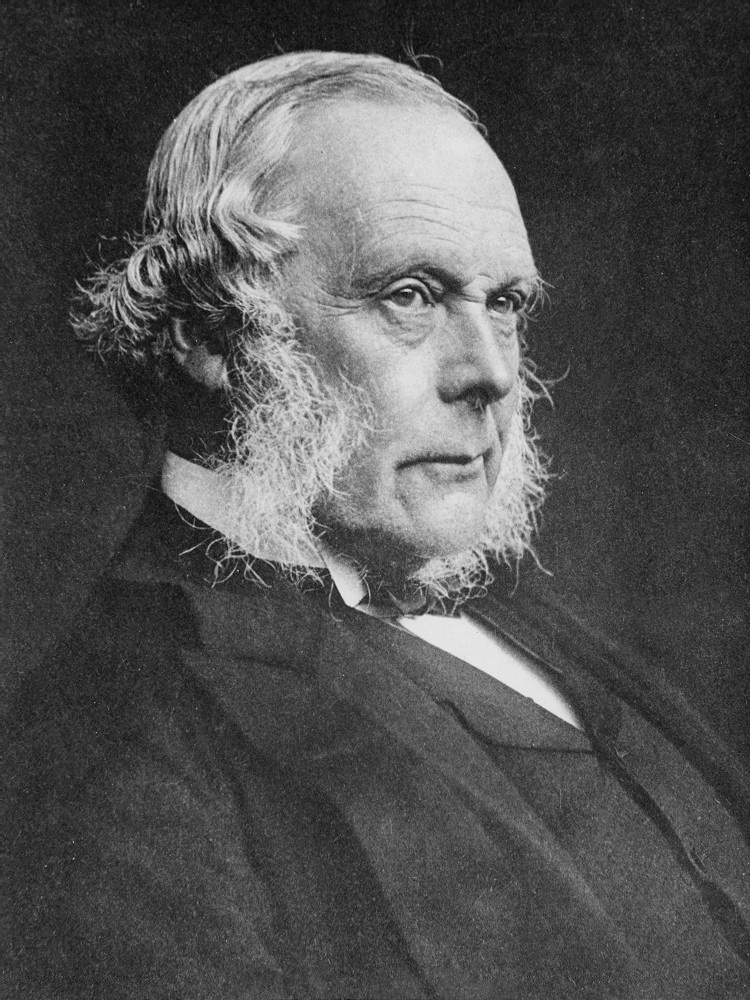
Joseph Lister

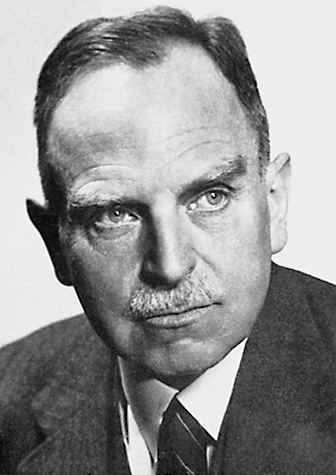
Otto Hahn

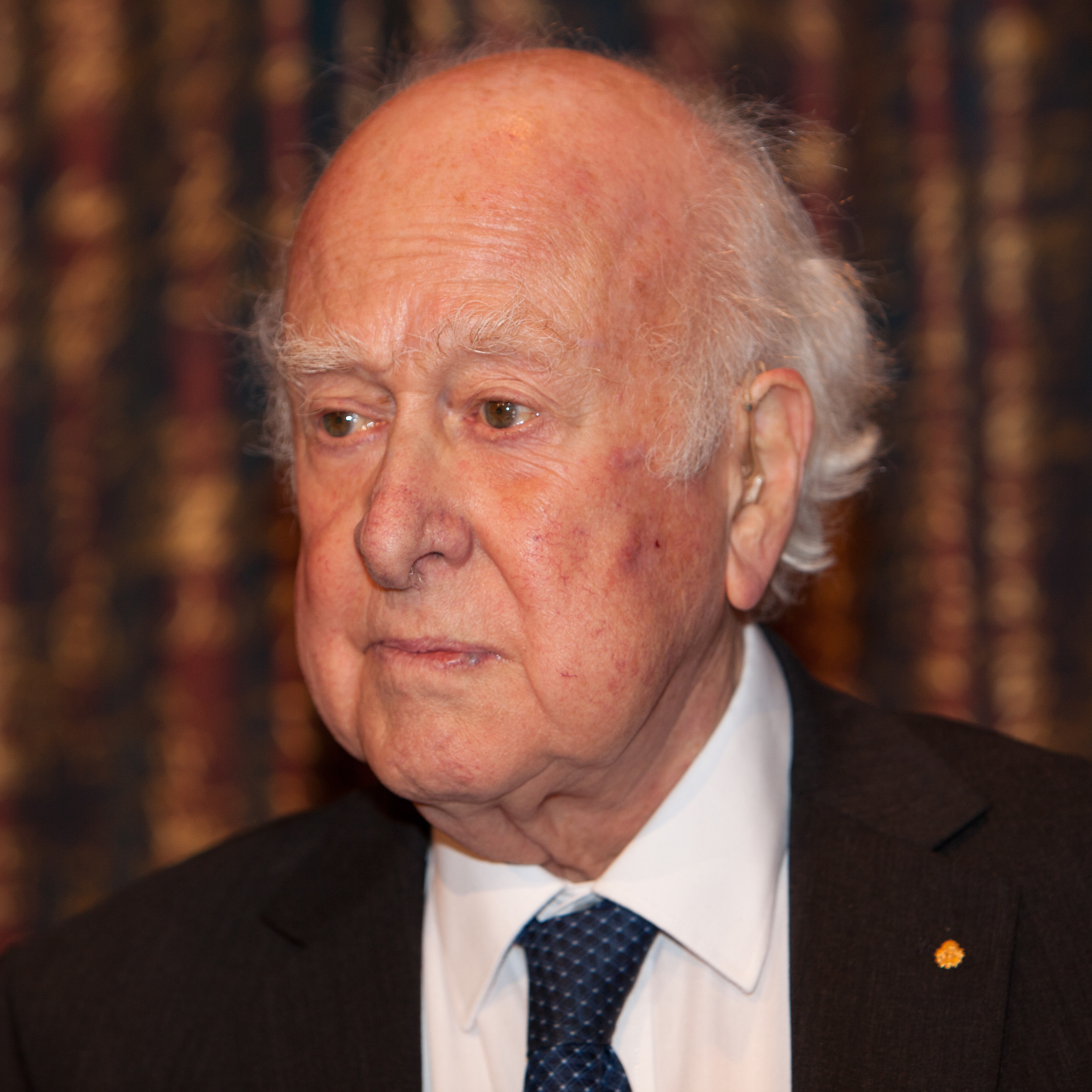
Peter Higgs

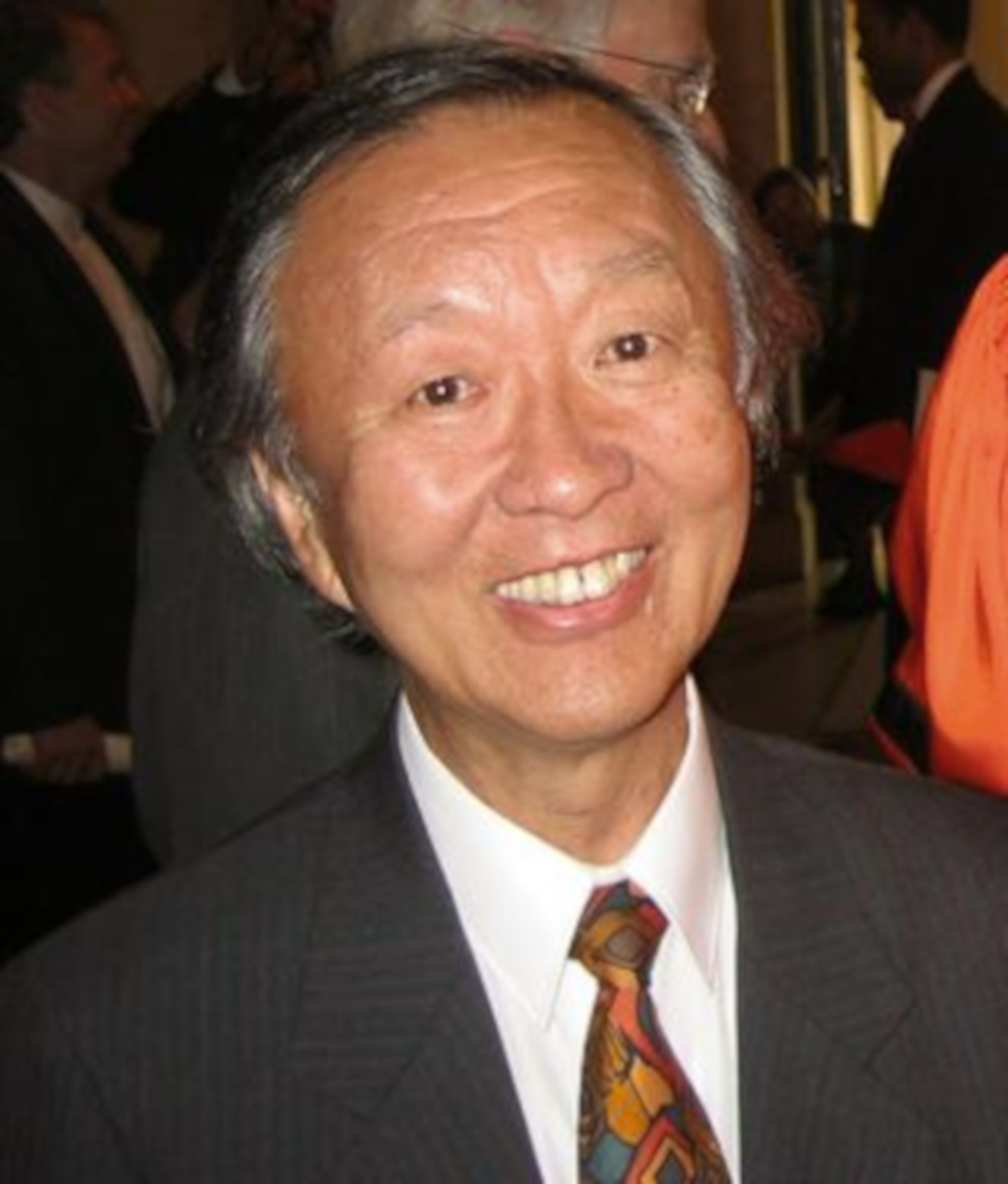
Charles K. Kao

In the 19th century, UCL operated as a college, with many students taking individual lecture courses rather than studying for degrees. These included well-known alumni such as Mahatma Gandhi, who took English classes with Henry Morley in 1888–89, and John Stuart Mill, who attended lectures on jurisprudence by John Austin. In the 20th century, Jomo Kenyatta (considered the "Founding Father" of Kenya), took courses on English and phonetics at UCL while working as a linguistic informant in the phonetics department.

== See also ==
- Armorial of UK universities
- List of universities in the UK
