= Thomas Baskerville (botanist) =

English botanical writer (1812–1840)

Thomas Baskerville (1812–1840?) was an English botanical writer.

Baskerville was born on 26 April 1812, and served a four-year apprenticeship to Mr. Soulby. From 1 December 1829 to 9 April 1834, he attended lectures on anatomy under Jones Quain, dissection under Richard Quain, and surgery under Samuel Cooper. In November of the latter year he attended the North London Hospital, obtained the membership of the College of Surgeons on 22 December 1835, and settled in practice at Canterbury. He was the author of Affinities of Plants, with some Observations upon Progressive Development, London, 1839, 8vo. He is stated to have died in London in 1840, but his name appears in the college annual list of members so late as 1843.
