= Queen's Club Gardens =

Garden square in London

Coordinates: 51.485363°N 0.209013°W

Mansion blocks in Queen's Club Gardens

Queen's Club Gardens is a garden square in the West Kensington area of London. It is named for the nearby Queen's Club.

== Background ==
The area of West Kensington was largely undeveloped until the arrival of the District Railway with the opening of North End Fulham Station now West Kensington Station in 1874. Much of the area was developed speculatively under Gibbs & Flew in the following years. The Queen's Club, a nearby lawn tennis club, was opened from 1886 and the buildings finished by 1888.

== History and description ==
In 1892, William H. Gibbs developed Queen's Club Gardens no longer in the partnership, naming them after the nearby club which had opened a few years before. Completed in 1894, the development consists of 33 blocks of mansions surrounding central gardens with tennis courts. The mansions are four or five storeys in height, all additionally with a basement level, with tall red brick gabled facades. From Victoria Mansions in the east of the square, there ran a distributive kitchen in the late 19th century. During the Second World War the gardens' railings were removed for use of their metal, but were replaced in 2001 with funding from the residents of the area.

=== Names ===
The blocks are named alphabetically after famous literary or historical figures with the exception of "X". The blocks' names and their inspiration are as follows:

- Arnold: Matthew Arnold (1822–1888), poet and critic
- Brandon: Unknown, possibly for the Brandon Family, John Raphael Brandon, architect or Richard Brandon, executioner
- Chaucer: Geoffrey Chaucer (c. 1343–1400), writer
- Dryden: John Dryden (1631–1700), poet and playwright
- Evelyn: John Evelyn (1620–1706), writer
- Faraday: Michael Faraday (1791–1867), chemist and physicist
- Gainsborough: Thomas Gainsborough (1727–1788), painter
- Heber: Reginald Heber (1783–1826), bishop and hymnwriter
- Irving: Henry Irving (1838–1905), actor
- Jessel: George Jessel (1824–1883), lawyer and scholar
- Johnson: Samuel Johnson (1709–1785), writer and polymath
- Kenyon: likely Lloyd Kenyon (1732–1802), politician and barrister
- Kingsley: Charles Kingsley (1819–1875), author
- Leighton: Frederick Leighton (1830–1896), painter and sculptor
- Livingstone: David Livingstone (1813–1873), colonialist, missionary and explorer
- Melbourne: William Lamb, 2nd Viscount Melbourne (1779–1848), Prime Minister
- Milton: John Milton (1608–1674), poet
- Newton: Isaac Newton (1642–1727), scientist
- Owen: Robert Owen (1771–1858), social reformer
- Playfair: Unknown, probably William Henry Playfair, architect
- Palmerston: Henry John Temple, 3rd Viscount Palmerston (1784–1865), Prime Minister
- Purcell: Henry Purcell (1659–1695), composer
- Quain: Unknown, possibly John Quain, judge, Jones Quian, anatomist or Richard Quian, surgeon
- Ruskin: John Ruskin (1819–1900), writer and polymath
- Spencer: Herbert Spencer (1820–1903), philosopher and political theorist
- Unwin: Mary Unwin (1724–1796), friend of William Cowper
- Vernon: Edward Vernon (1684–1757), admiral
- Victoria: Queen Victoria (1819–1901)
- Wellington: Arthur Wellesley, 1st Duke of Wellington (1769–1852), general and statesman
- Wordsworth: William Wordsworth (1770–1850), poet
- Yarrell: William Yarrell (1784–1856), writer, zoologist and naturalist
- Zenobia: Zenobia (c. 230–274), ruler of Palmyra

== See also ==
- Queen's Club
