= William Coulson (surgeon) =

English surgeon

William Coulson (1802 – 1877) was an English surgeon.

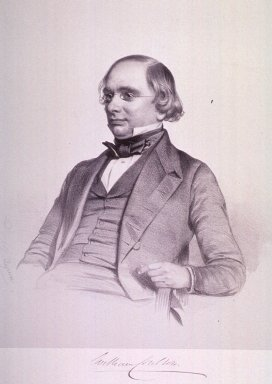
William Coulson, engraving by Thomas Herbert Maguire, ca 1847–52

== Life ==
The younger son of Thomas Coulson, master painter in Devonport dockyard, he was born at Penzance; Walter Coulson was an elder brother. His father was a close friend of Sir Humphry Davy; his mother was Catherine Borlase. After receiving some classical education at the local grammar school, Coulson spent two years in Brittany (1816–18), studying the French language and literature. Having first been apprenticed to a Penzance surgeon, he entered Edward Grainger's School of Anatomy in the Borough, and attended St. Thomas's Hospital, where he became dresser to Frederick Tyrrell. He then studied in Berlin, where he knew the poet Thomas Campbell, and spent some months in Paris.

Coulson returned to London, and became a member of the Royal College of Surgeons on 26 September 1826. He helped found the Aldersgate Street School of Medicine with Tyrrell, Sir William Lawrence, and others, and acted for three years as demonstrator of anatomy. In 1828 he was elected surgeon to the Aldersgate Street Dispensary, and in 1830 consulting surgeon to the City of London Lying-in Hospital. In 1832 he, with his colleagues, resigned his connection with the Aldersgate Dispensary in a quarrel with the committee. In the same year he joined the medical board of the Royal Sea-bathing Infirmary at Margate.

In 1833 Coulson failed to secure election to an assistant-surgeoncy at the London Hospital, being beaten by Thomas Blizard Curling. His practice increased with his publications, He moved from his early residence in Charterhouse Square to a house in Frederick's Place, Old Jewry, where he had for many years perhaps the largest city practice.

Coulson was elected among the first batch of fellows of the Royal College of Surgeons in 1843, became a member of the College's council in 1851, and in 1861 delivered the Hunterian oration. When St. Mary's Hospital, Paddington, was established, Coulson was elected senior surgeon. Besides being a specialist and successful operator in diseases of the bladder, Coulson undertook a large proportion of more strictly medical cases and accumulated a large fortune. He married in 1840 Maria Bartram, an artist. She died on 4 January 1876, and was followed by her husband on 5 May 1877.

== Works ==
About the time when The Lancet was first published in 1823, Coulson attracted Thomas Wakley's attention, becoming a contributor, and then a staff member. From 1824 to 1826 he studied in Berlin, supplying the Edinburgh Medical and Surgical Journal with foreign correspondence. Back in London, he superintended the foreign department of the Lancet, and made translations from foreign works. His investigations on post-partum afflictions of the joints at the Lying-in Hospital contributed the knowledge of their nature and pathology. They were published in the second edition of his Diseases of the Hip Joint. In 1827 he wrote notes to Henri Milne-Edwards's Surgical Anatomy, and published a second, revised and expanded edition of Lawrence's translation of Johann Friedrich Blumenbach's Comparative Anatomy. He was also a contributor and adviser in connection with the cyclopædia and other publications of the Useful Knowledge Society.

Coulson was a liberal, a disciple of Thomas Carlyle, F. D. Maurice, and John Stuart Mill; also a friend of Richard Harris Barham, Francis Newman and other literary men. His major works were:

- On Deformities of the Chest, 1836; 2nd edit. 1837, enlarged, with numerous plates.
- On Diseases of the Hip Joint, 1837; 2nd edit. 1841.
- On Diseases of the Bladder and Prostate Gland, 1838; 2nd edit. enlarged, with plates, 1840; 6th edit. 1865.
- On Lithotrity and Lithotomy, 1853.
- Lectures on Diseases of the Joints, 1854.

Coulson also contributed the articles "Lithotomy" and "Lithotrity" to Samuel Cooper's Practical Surgery, edited by Samuel Armstrong Lane (1861–1872), and wrote for William Birmingham Costello's Cyclopædia of Practical Surgery, 1841–3.

== Notes ==
Attribution

This article incorporates text from a publication now in the public domain: Stephen, Leslie, ed. (1887). "Coulson, William". Dictionary of National Biography. Vol. 12. London: Smith, Elder & Co.
