= Wardrop =

Wardrop is a name of Scottish origin and appears to be a corruption of the name "Wardrobe", meaning keeper of clothes. It may refer to:

- Sir Alexander Wardrop (1872–1961), British Army General
- Andrew Wardrop (c.1740–1789), Scottish surgeon
- Bert Wardrop (born 1932), British swimmer
- Jack Wardrop (born 1932), former Scottish Olympic swimmer
- James Wardrop (1782–1869), Scottish surgeon
- John Glen Wardrop (1886–1969), British transport analyst
- Marjory Wardrop (1869–1909), British literary scholar
- Martha Wardrop, Scottish Green politician
- Mike Wardrop, English footballer
- Sir Oliver Wardrop (1864–1948), British diplomat, traveller and translator
- Sam Wardrop (born 1997), Scottish footballer
- Wardrop Muir (1878–1927), English photographer and author
