= Richard Quain =

Richard Quain may refer to:

- Richard Quain (Irish physician) (1816–1898)
- Richard Quain (English surgeon) (1800–1887), English anatomist and surgeon
