= Allen Thomson =

Scottish physician

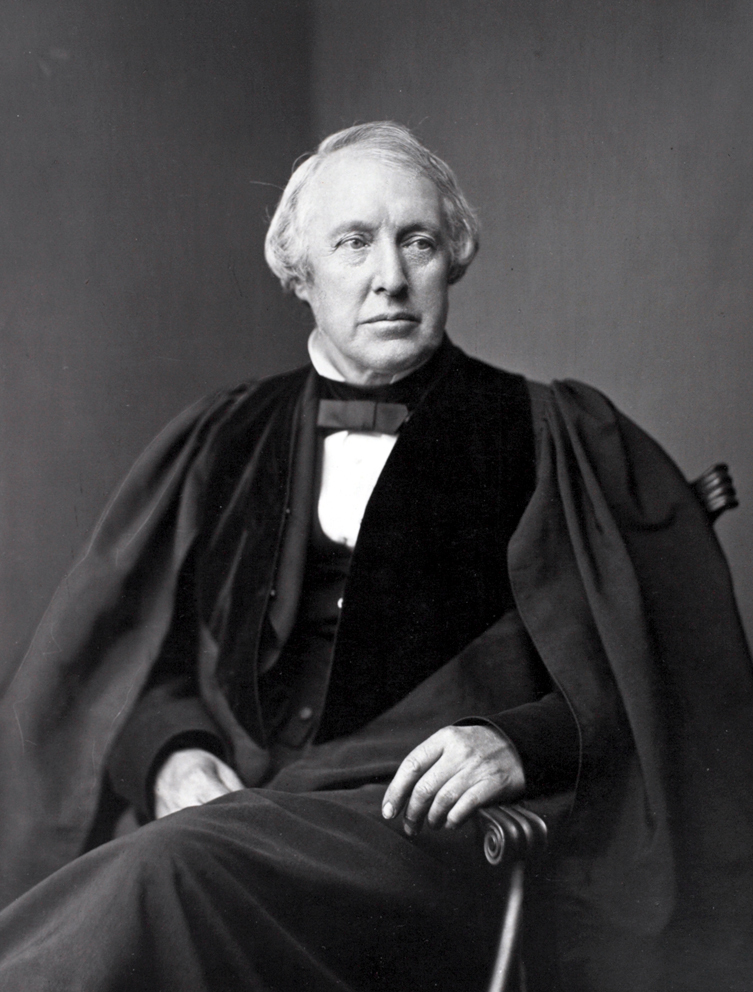
Allen Thomson

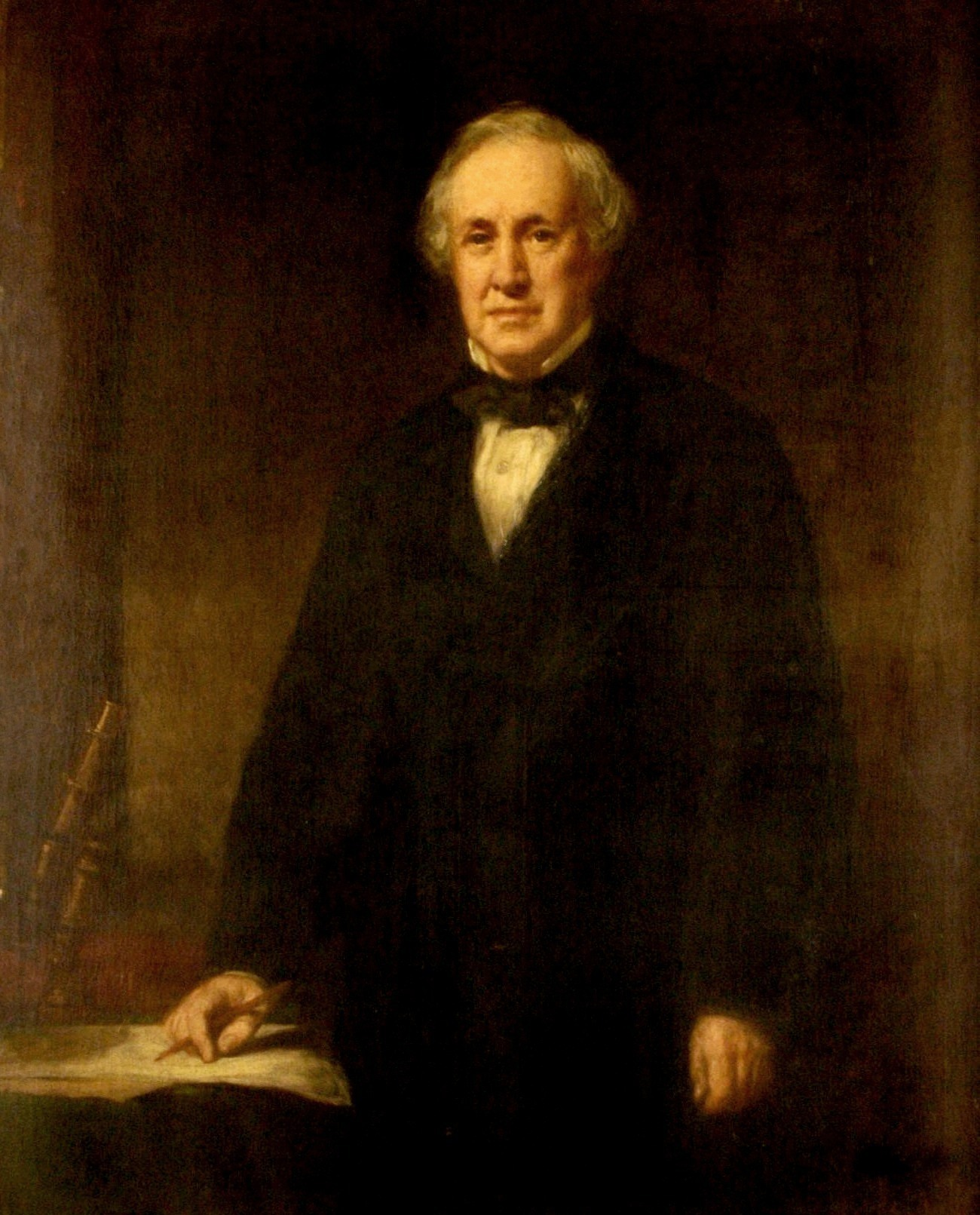
Allen Thomson, 1878 portrait by Daniel Macnee, Hunterian Museum and Art Gallery collection.

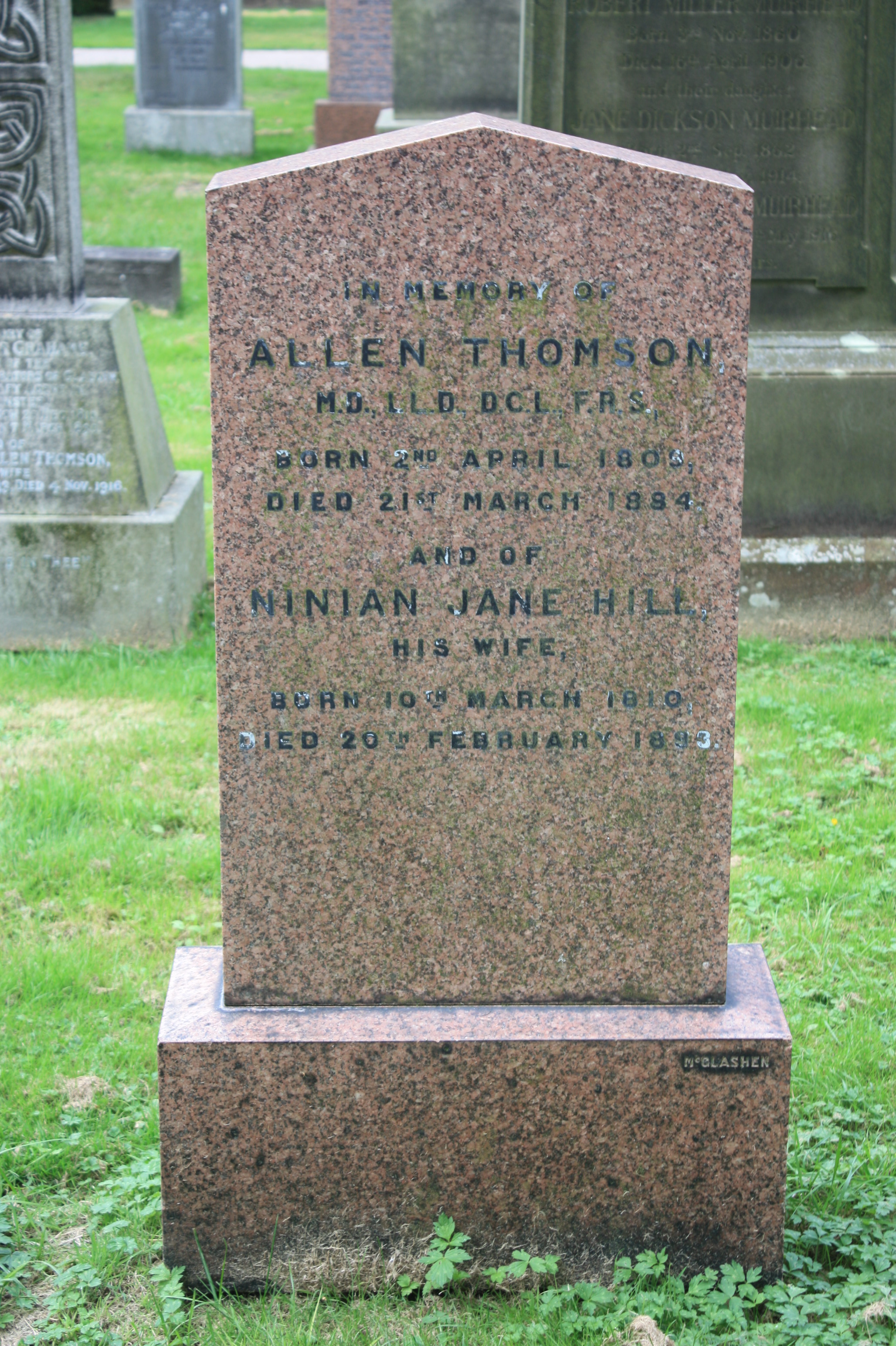
The grave of Allen Thomson, Dean Cemetery, Edinburgh

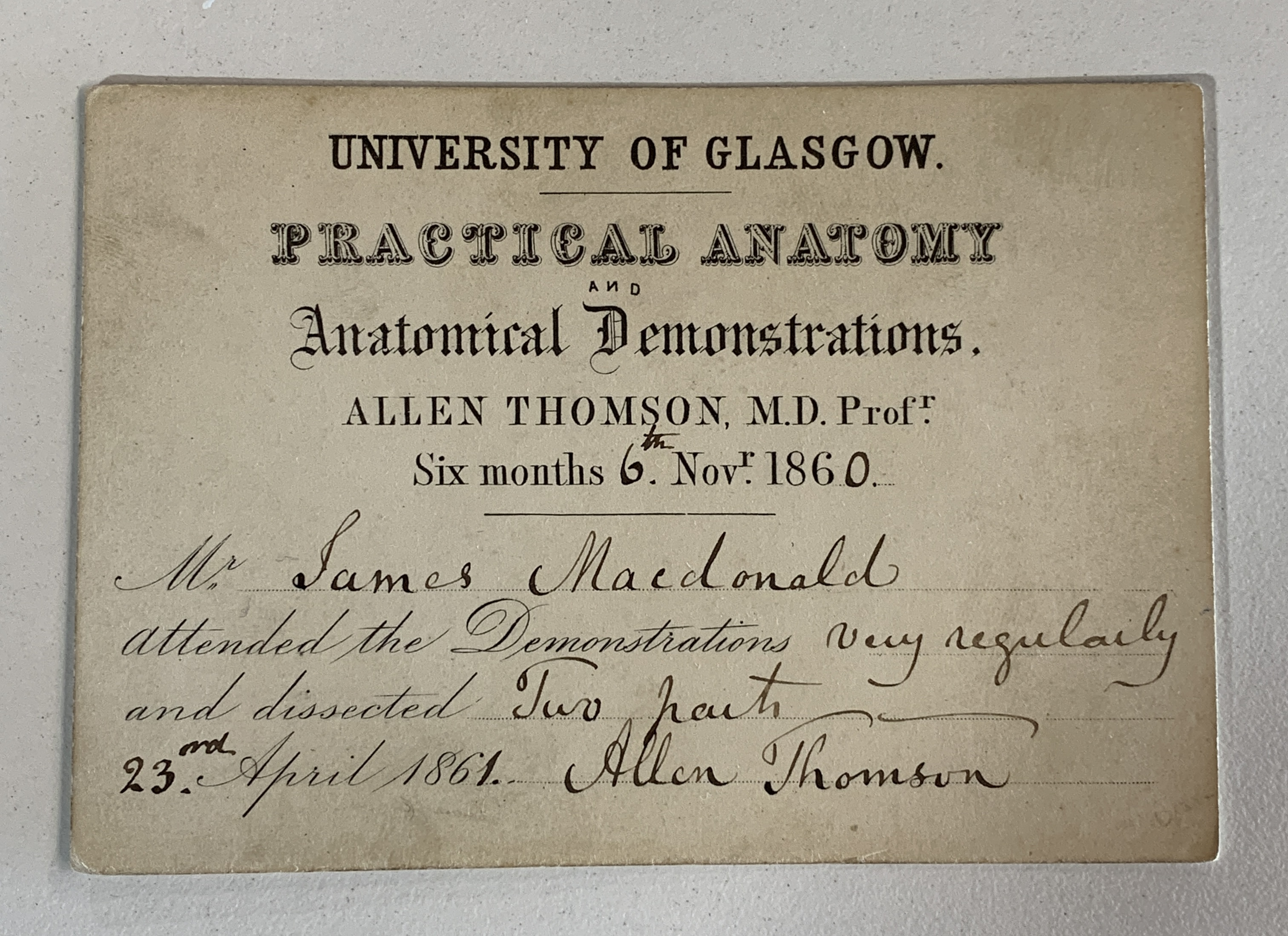
Photograph of a lecture ticket dated 6 Nov 1860 demonstrating attendance to six months of Allen Thomson anatomy lectures.

Allen Thomson FRS FRSE FRCSE (2 April 1809 – 21 March 1884) was a Scottish physician, known as an anatomist and embryologist.

== Life ==
The only son of Dr John Thomson by his second wife, Margaret, daughter of John Millar, he was born at Brown Square in Edinburgh on 2 April 1809, and was named after his father's friend, John Allen, secretary and confidential friend of Lord Holland. Margaret Mylne was his sister and William Thomson his half-brother. Allen Thomson was educated at the high school and University of Edinburgh, and then in Paris. He graduated doctor of medicine at the University of Edinburgh in August 1830. At the time of his graduation he was president of the Royal Medical Society in Edinburgh. He became a fellow of the Royal College of Surgeons of Edinburgh in 1831.

Thomson travelled in the Netherlands and Germany, visiting anatomical and pathological museums, and taking notes. On his return to Edinburgh he began to lecture at 9 Surgeon's Square as an extramural teacher of physiology in association with William Sharpey, who lectured on anatomy. These lectures were given from 1831 to 1836, and during the latter part of the time Thomson assisted also in teaching anatomy. In 1833 he travelled with his father for nearly three months, visiting medical schools in the Netherlands, Germany, Italy, and France. From 1837 to 1839 he became private physician to John Russell, 6th Duke of Bedford, then an invalid.

Thomson was appointed professor of anatomy in Marischal College, Aberdeen, in October 1839; but after the collapse of the joint school in the university in 1841 he resigned his chair, and again became a teacher in the Extramural School, this time at 1 Surgeon's Square, Edinburgh. In the summer of 1842 he delivered a special course of lectures on microscopic anatomy, a subject which was then new. In these lectures he supplemented the views of German observers with results from his own investigations. In 1841 William Pulteney Alison resigned the chair of physiology in Edinburgh, and in 1842 Thomson was elected his successor. He occupied this chair for six years, making contributions to embryology. He was appointed Regius Professor of Anatomy in the University of Glasgow in 1848, in succession to James Jeffray. This chair he held until 1877, when he resigned it and went to live in London.

Thomson was elected a fellow of the Royal Society of Edinburgh in 1838, and of the Royal Society of London in 1848. He became a councillor of the Royal Society of London in 1877, and one of the vice-presidents in 1878. He was president of the Philosophical Society, of the Medico-Chirurgical Society, and of the Science Lectures Association in Glasgow, and was also the first president of the local branch of the British Medical Association. From 1859 to 1877 he represented the universities of Glasgow and of St. Andrews jointly on the General Medical Council, where his ripe experience and calm judgment enabled him to do good service to the cause of medical education. He was president of the biological section of the British Association at the Edinburgh meeting in 1871, and in 1876 was elected president of the Association. In his presidential address in the following year he reviewed the history of the Darwinian theory of evolution. In 1871 the University of Edinburgh conferred upon him the degree of LL.D., the University of Glasgow paid him a similar compliment in 1877, and he received the degree of D.C.L. from the University of Oxford in 1882.

Thomson acted as chairman of the removal and buildings committee of the University of Glasgow from 1863 to 1874, when the university buildings on Gilmorehill were successfully completed and occupied. He also took an active part in the erection of the Western Infirmary.

He died in London on 21 March 1884, at 66 Palace Gardens Terrace. He is buried with his wife, Ninian Jane Hill, in Dean Cemetery in western Edinburgh. The grave faces the southmost path from the south-east corner of the south-east section.

== Works ==
Thomson was a draughtsman, and his diagrams were long current in textbooks of anatomy and physiology. He wrote on physiological optics, on the mechanism by which the eye accommodates or focusses itself for objects at different distances.

Thomson took part in editing the seventh, eighth, and ninth editions of Jones Quain's 'Elements of Anatomy.' He was associated in the seventh edition with Sharpey and Cleland, in the eighth with Sharpey and Schäfer, and in the ninth edition with Schäfer and Thane. He also edited the second volume of William Cullen's Life, part of his father's project to issue Cullen's Works, and to the reissue of the first volume he prefixed a biographical notice of his half-brother William.

Manuscripts of Thompson's essays are held at the Cadbury Research Library, University of Birmingham. His medical papers, lecture notes, drawings and correspondence are held at the Archives of the University of Glasgow.

== Family ==
Thomson married Ninian Jane Hill (1810-1893), the daughter of Ninian Hill, writer to the signet, Edinburgh. By her he had an only son, John Millar Thomson FRS FRSE.

He was half-brother to Prof William Thomson, son of his father's first wife. William married Allen's sister-in-law, Eliza Hill. William is buried next to him.
