= Margaret Mylne =

Scottish suffragette and writer (1806–1892)

- Born: 2 December 1806; Colinton, Midlothian, Scotland
- Died: 15 January 1892 (aged 85)
- Known for: Suffragette and writer
- Spouse: John Millar Mylne
- Parent(s): John Thomso and Margaret Millar

Margaret Mylne (née Thomson, 2 December 1806 – 15 January 1892) was a Scottish suffragette and writer. She was a signatory to the petition for women's suffrage presented to the House of Commons in 1866.

== Life ==
Mylne née Thomson was born in Colinton, Midlothian, Scotland, in 1806 to Professor John Thomson of Edinburgh and Margaret Millar. She married John Millar Mylne in Edinburgh in 1843 and had two daughters. The family later moved to London, England.

== Writer ==
Mylne published an article in the Westminster Review in 1841 on 'Woman and her Social Position' under the pseudonym P.M.Y. It explored progress towards gender equality in western civilisation and called for women who exercised the duties of citizens to be given the right to vote:

"As soon as ever I understood the benefits expected from a £10 franchise, I began to wish the female householders should have it too, thinking it only fair", she wrote.

Mylne republished the article using her real name in 1872 in which she reiterated her support for women's suffrage.

== Family ==
Her younger brother was Allen Thomson and William Thomson her half-brother, from her father's first marriage. Her paternal grandfather was John Millar of Glasgow.
