= James Wardrop =

Scottish surgeon and ophthalmologist (1782–1869)

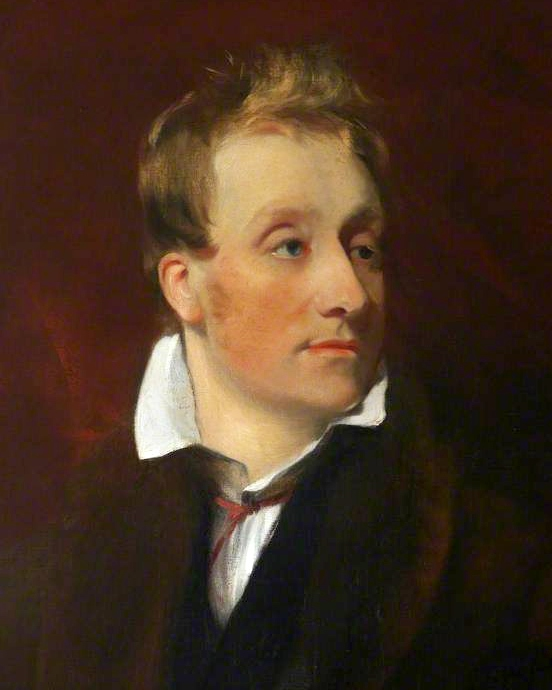
- James Wardrop by Andrew Geddes
- Born: 14 August 1782; Torbane Hill, Bathgate
- Died: 13 February 1869 (aged 86)
- Burial place: Bathgate Old Kirk
- Occupations: Surgeon and ophthalmologist
- Parents: James Wardrop (1738-1830) (father); Christian (Marjoribanks) Wardrop (mother)
- Relatives: Andrew Wardrop

James Wardrop or Wardrope (1782–1869) was a Scottish surgeon and ophthalmologist. Surgeon to King George IV and responsible for being the first to describe a retinoblastoma and uveal melanoma. And coining the term 'keratitis'.

== Early life ==
Wardrop was born on 14 August 1782, the youngest son of James Wardrop (1738-1830) and his wife, Christian Marjoribanks, at Torbane Hill, in Bathgate, West Lothian, a family estate where the Wardrops had lived for several generations. But at four years of age moved with the family to live in Edinburgh where he attended the High School, and then St Andrews University.

Wardrop’s father had initially pursued legal studies, but abandoned them at the age of 20 following the death of his own father. Wardrop's mother, Christian, died in childbirth a year after his birth. She was the sister of Alexander Marjoribanks, owner of Balbardie House, an Adam-style mansion in Bathgate.

In 1786, when James was four years old, the Torbane hill estate was put up for sale. The family then relocated to a residence in south Edinburgh overlooking The Meadows.

Wardrop began his education at the High School in Edinburgh before the age of seven. At the time, the school had an enrollment of around 570 pupils, making it the largest in the United Kingdom. Under the rectorship of Dr. Alexander Adam, the curriculum focused heavily on Greek and Latin.

Among Wardrop’s contemporaries at the High School were several notable figures, including Adam Black (later MP and Lord Provost of Edinburgh), James Abercromby (Speaker of the House of Commons), and the brothers Leonard and Francis Horner. Another classmate, Andrew Geddes, went on to become a portrait painter and later painted portraits of both James Wardrop (now housed in the Royal College of Surgeons of Edinburgh) and his father (held in the Aberdeen Art Gallery).

== Medical Training and Education ==
Although initially intended for a naval career, Wardrop developed a strong interest in natural history, which ultimately led him to pursue medicine. In 1800, at the age of 18, on the same day as James Keith he was apprenticed to a leading firm of surgeon apothecaries in Edinburgh, which included Benjamin Bell, James Russell and his great uncle Andrew Wardrop, former president of the Royal College of Surgeons of Edinburgh, and in 1801 was appointed House Surgeon at Edinburgh Royal Infirmary. Three months earlier, the surgeon apothecaries accepted John Henry Wishart of Foxhall, to whom Wardrop would later dedicate one of his books.

Wardrop studied anatomy under Alexander Monro secundus and John Barclay at an extra-mural school in Edinburgh. He was appointed house surgeon at the Royal Infirmary of Edinburgh, then located in the William Adam-designed building on Infirmary Street. During his tenure there, he famously performed a thigh amputation on a young patient to assess whether he had the temperament necessary for surgical practice.

In 1801, Wardrop travelled to London to continue his medical education under John Abernethy and Astley Cooper at St Thomas’s, Guy’s, and St George’s Hospitals. Cooper, who had previously studied in Edinburgh in 1787, was a leading surgeon of the time and reportedly once charged a wealthy West Indian planter 1,000 guineas for a bladder stone removal.

In 1803, Wardrop moved to Paris to further his medical education. There he encountered the work of notable physicians such as Guillaume Dupuytren and Marie François Xavier Bichat. However, shortly after his arrival, war was declared between France and Britain as part of the Napoleonic Wars. British nationals in France were subject to arrest, and Wardrop initially avoided capture by hiding in a secluded room at the École de Médecine.

Eventually, he was detained and interned at Fontainebleau along with other British nationals. Despite the circumstances, the detainees engaged in recreational activities, including picnics and swimming in the canals. Wardrop even practiced swimming with the idea that he might need to cross the Rhine to escape. During his internment, he secretly returned to Paris on several occasions to continue his studies and made sketches at the Louvre.

Wardrop eventually obtained a false passport identifying him as an American merchant and fled to Antwerp, hoping to sail to the United States. Finding no available sailings, he continued overland to Germany, successfully crossing the Rhine at Koblenz, and eventually reaching freedom. From there, he travelled to Vienna, where his friend John Wishart was studying ophthalmology under Georg Joseph Beer, one of the most prominent ophthalmic surgeons in Europe at the time.

He was admitted a Fellow of the Royal College of Surgeons of Edinburgh in 1804 and worked at the Public Dispensary and set up in surgical practice specialising as an ophthalmic surgeon. In 1807 he became assistant curator of Surgeons' Hall Museum under Professor John Thomson and was elected a Fellow of the Royal Society of Edinburgh in 1808, upon the proposal of Andrew Wardrop, Alexander Keith of Dunnottar and James Russell. In 1805 he was elected a member of the Aesculapian Club. In 1808 he was sharing a large Georgian house in Edinburgh's First New Town at 4 South Hanover Street alongside his uncle and former mentor, Andrew Wardrop. During this time, he began to take a particular interest in diseases of the eye, which would shape much of his later work.

== Career ==
In 1807, Wardrop was appointed assistant to Professor John Thomson, then Professor of Surgery and the first Regius Professor of Military Surgery at the University of Edinburgh. In this capacity, he also served as curator of the museum of the Royal College of Surgeons of Edinburgh. The first volume of the College’s General Catalogue includes entries in Wardrop’s own handwriting, documenting specimens—some of which he had donated himself.

He became an active participant in several medical societies, including the Royal Medical Society and the Medico-Chirurgical Society. His first scientific publication appeared in the Edinburgh Medical and Surgical Journal in 1806, describing a case of crural hernia he had observed in Paris, illustrated with a drawing of his own.

In 1807, Wardrop published additional case reports and a significant paper titled Observations on the Effects of Evacuating the Aqueous Humour in Inflammation of the Eyes, and on the Changes Produced in the Transparency of the Cornea from the Increase or Diminution of the Contents of the Eyeball. This work built upon earlier research by John Barclay, who had demonstrated corneal opacification in a bullock’s eye following injection of the ophthalmic veins with mercury. Wardrop’s publication detailed five clinical cases of patients aged between 13 and 45, likely suffering from uveitis and secondary glaucoma, although not primary angle-closure glaucoma.

In 1808, he followed this with Practical Observations on the Mode of Making the Incision of the Cornea for the Extraction of the Cataract. In this work, he advocated using Beer’s knife, lubricated with oil and applied perpendicular to the corneal surface to prevent premature escape of aqueous humour—a method that remains relevant in modern cataract surgery. The precise technique of corneal incision continues to be a subject of discussion among ophthalmologists nearly two centuries later.

Also in 1808, Wardrop published the first volume of his textbook, Essays on the Morbid Anatomy of the Human Eye. He dedicated the work to his uncle Andrew Wardrop, writing:

“This essay is inscribed as a testimony of the author’s gratitude, for the professional advantages derived, and the benefits experienced, from the kindness of an affectionate relative, and sincere friend.”

This volume focused on corneal disease and introduced the term "keratitis" into medical literature. Unlike previous authors who used the broader term "ophthalmia", Wardrop described ocular conditions with reference to the specific anatomical structures affected. He gave accurate descriptions of keratitic precipitates, though he incorrectly attributed them to inflammation of Descemet’s membrane. In the Preliminary Observations, he emphasized the advantages of the eye as a subject for pathological study, noting:

“For this beautiful organ is not only composed of a great variety of textures, but the transparency and ready examination of many of its parts in the living body admit of a great minuteness and accuracy of observation, and the various morbid changes can be seen going on much more distinctly than in any other part of the body.”

In 1809, Wardrop published another notable work, Observations on the Fungus Hæmatodes, which presented 17 cases of a malignant ocular tumour initially named in 1805 by William Hey of Leeds (an Honorary Member of the Royal Medical Society of Edinburgh). This condition would later be reclassified as retinoblastoma. Drawing on both previous literature and his own clinical and pathological observations, Wardrop correctly identified the tumour’s origin in the retina, its potential to invade the optic nerve, and the need for early enucleation—though this approach was impractical in children before the development of effective general anaesthesia.

Around this time, Wardrop was also commissioned to write the article on Surgery for the Encyclopædia Britannica.

In 1808, seeking to establish an independent practice and facing limited immediate opportunities in surgery in Scotland, Wardrop moved to London, where he worked as an ophthalmic surgeon from 1809 to 1869. He was awarded his doctorate (MD) by his alma mater, St Andrews University, in 1834. He taught surgery from 1826 at the Aldersgate Street medical academy with Sir William Lawrence and Frederick Tyrrell, and published surgical treatises. Wardrop was early appointed Surgeon-in-Ordinary to the Prince Regent. This annoyed his rivals in London, and he found the doors of the large hospitals closed to him. In retaliation he founded the West London Hospital for Surgery near the Edgware Road, and invited general practitioners to watch him operate. Further royal honours came, but he declined a baronetcy (in lieu of royal fees) and moved out of royal circles. His social gifts, a knowledge of horses and marriage to a wife with aristocratic connections, brought him popularity.

He initially lived in rented accommodation on York Street, later settling at 2 Charles Street, St James’s Square, where he remained for the rest of his life. From this residence, he ran his medical practice, attracting a number of Scottish expatriates as patients and likely teaching at private medical schools.

Wardrop also came into contact with Carlton House, the residence of the Prince Regent, where he treated members of the royal household. His work brought him to the attention of Sir Benjamin Bloomfield, the Prince's secretary, and Lord Lowther, a close associate of the Regent. In recognition of his service, Wardrop was appointed Surgeon Extraordinary to the Royal Household. During this period, he also became acquainted with Matthew Baillie, a prominent physician whose private museum Wardrop was permitted to access.

Though he did not hold a teaching hospital appointment—possibly limiting his academic output—Wardrop continued to publish selectively. In 1818, he released the second volume of his major work, Essays on the Morbid Anatomy of the Human Eye, aiming both to advance his professional reputation and supplement his income. The volume, dedicated to his friend John Wishart, comprised 55 short chapters covering a wide range of ophthalmological subjects including the aqueous humour, iris, choroid, lens, vitreous body, sympathetic ophthalmia, amaurosis, night-blindness, colour vision, strabismus, and nystagmus, then referred to as "involuntary motion of the eyeball."

In this volume, Wardrop provided one of the earliest descriptions of iridodonesis—the tremulous motion of the iris—writing:

“In some cases where the operation for cataract has been performed, and where the iris remains apparently uninjured and the pupil of its natural form, the iris has been observed to have a very singular undulatory motion, being agitated to and fro like a piece of cloth exposed to a fluctuating wind.”

The book also includes the first published reference to sympathetic ophthalmia, a serious inflammatory condition of the eye, and remained an influential text well into the late 19th century, predating William Mackenzie’s Treatise on the Diseases of the Eye (1830) by 12 years.

In the same year, Wardrop published a separate treatise titled On the Effects of Evacuating the Aqueous Humour on the Different Species of the Inflammation of the Eyes and in Some Diseases of the Cornea. This 57-page report presented 17 clinical cases, two of which are particularly notable. In the first, a 50-year-old man with a two-week history of visual disturbance experienced immediate improvement following paracentesis using Cheselden’s needle. Wardrop recorded that the patient was immediately able to "perceive a finger with a ring" and that the cornea quickly regained its natural transparency. In the second case, a middle-aged woman with a four-day history of intense frontal pain and ciliary injection saw an immediate resolution of symptoms following the procedure.

Wardrop compared the sudden reduction of intraocular pressure to the relief obtained from the evacuation of an abscess. Although he did not recognize it at the time, he was effectively treating acute angle-closure glaucoma, a condition not clearly defined until much later.

== Royal Surgeon ==
In 1811, James Wardrop was appointed Surgeon Extraordinary to the Prince Regent, the eldest son and heir of King George III, who was periodically incapacitated by mental illness now believed to have been caused by acute porphyria. The circumstances under which Wardrop came to the attention of the Prince Regent remain uncertain, although both men shared a strong interest in hunting and horse racing. Wardrop was considered "one of the best judges of horseflesh in the kingdom" and had treated one of Lord Lowther’s horses for an ocular condition—an engagement that, alongside his lifelong involvement with horses, likely contributed to his introduction at court.

The Prince of Wales (later George IV) had been an active participant in horse racing, with a record of 190 winners between 1778 and 1791. However, controversy arose in October 1791 when the King's horse, Escape, performed poorly in one race at Newmarket only to win unexpectedly the following day. Although an inquiry found no wrongdoing, the incident led George III to withdraw from racing for several years. It is speculated that Wardrop and the Prince may have first met at one of the major racecourses such as Newmarket, Epsom, Ascot, or Lewes.

Professionally, Wardrop occasionally attended to the royal stables at Windsor. Through discussions with royal grooms, he learned of a practice in which a severely injured eye in a horse was treated either with caustic substances or by evisceration using a nail to prevent inflammation in the other eye. This observation represents one of the earliest descriptions of sympathetic ophthalmia, a condition not fully treatable until the advent of corticosteroids in the mid-20th century. In 1819, Wardrop was awarded a prize by the Board of Agriculture for his essay on diseases of the equine eye and their treatment.

Upon the death of George III in 1820, the Prince Regent ascended the throne as George IV. During his celebrated visit to Scotland in 1822, the King was accompanied by two medical advisers: Sir William Knighton and James Wardrop. Knighton, who had studied at Guy’s Hospital and earned medical degrees from the universities of St Andrews and Aberdeen, was created a baronet in 1812 and later became Keeper of the Privy Purse, abandoning active medical practice in 1822.

During the royal stay at Dalkeith Palace, Wardrop was called upon to treat Knighton, who was suffering from ophthalmia. He administered bloodletting, reportedly providing immediate relief. King George IV entered the room during the procedure and engaged Wardrop in conversation—initially regarding the treatment, and subsequently their shared enthusiasm for horses. After the visit, Wardrop returned to his father’s residence in Lauriston Lane, Edinburgh.

In 1825, Wardrop edited the sixth edition of Morbid Anatomy, a collection of works by Matthew Baillie, to which he also contributed a biographical account. Baillie, who had died in 1823, was regarded as one of the most prominent physicians in London and is credited as the first British pathologist. Born in Shotts, Lanarkshire, he was the nephew of anatomists William and John Hunter, and the original edition of Morbid Anatomy was published in 1793. One of its engravings, depicting emphysema of the lung, is believed to represent the lungs of Dr. Samuel Johnson.

By the spring of 1830, King George IV’s health had significantly declined. Notably obese, more so than contemporary portraiture would suggest, he suffered from increasing immobility, breathlessness, and insomnia. James Wardrop visited the King at the end of March and was reportedly alarmed by his condition, particularly the state of his heart. He urged the involvement of Sir Henry Saunders. A month later, Wardrop was summoned again to Windsor.

According to later accounts, during this visit the King directly addressed Wardrop, saying:

“Tell me, my good friend, what you think, really and truly is the matter with me, for I am confident that there is something more serious than—[the name is omitted]—either thinks or chooses to tell me... Tell me Wardrop, honestly, if you think I shall recover.”

Wardrop recommended the application of stimulants to the legs and feet, as well as leeches to the region of the heart. However, shortly thereafter, he was excluded from further attendance on the King. The royal medical team was instead composed of Sir Henry Halford and Sir Benjamin Brodie.

King George IV died at approximately 3:15 a.m. on 26 June 1830. Despite public bulletins on his condition having been released for two months, the death came as a surprise to many. In Parliament, Henry Brougham, a former pupil of the High School of Edinburgh, accused the government of concealment and deception regarding the King's true state of health. The Lancet echoed these criticisms in an editorial, singling out Sir William Knighton, formerly a physician and by then Keeper of the Privy Purse, as particularly culpable.

Wardrop, who had long maintained a professional connection with The Lancet and its editor, Thomas Wakley, submitted a bill for 1,200 guineas to the executors of the King's estate. Although Knighton objected to the amount, the Duke of Wellington, upon inquiry, was assured that Wardrop had indeed rendered the services claimed. Wellington concluded, “If he has done the work for which he charges, he shall be paid,” and the full amount was disbursed.

In the years following George IV’s death, Wardrop’s professional standing suffered. Beginning in 1833, The Lancet published a series of anonymously authored "intercepted letters" purportedly written by leading court physicians, including Brodie, Halford, and Sir James MacMichael. These letters, which were often defamatory and satirical in tone, commented on medical affairs and the royal court. Their publication is believed to have contributed to the decline of Wardrop’s reputation and practice, distancing him from the medical establishment.

Wardrop’s professional isolation was compounded by rivalry with Robert Liston, a prominent Scottish surgeon also from West Lothian who was appointed to the chair of surgery at University College London in 1835. Liston once remarked that “Jemmy Wardrop blocks me out of practice with the Scotch nobility.” Known for his contentious relationships in Edinburgh, Liston had also been barred from entering the Royal Infirmary there. As Liston gained influence with The Lancet, critical articles about Wardrop increased in frequency.

Despite his declining practice, Wardrop remained known for his generosity to less fortunate colleagues and patients. However, following the death of George IV, his influence diminished, and he retained only a limited consulting practice, primarily among members of the Scottish nobility residing in London.

Wardrop became a Fellow of the Royal College of Surgeons of England in 1843.

== Death ==
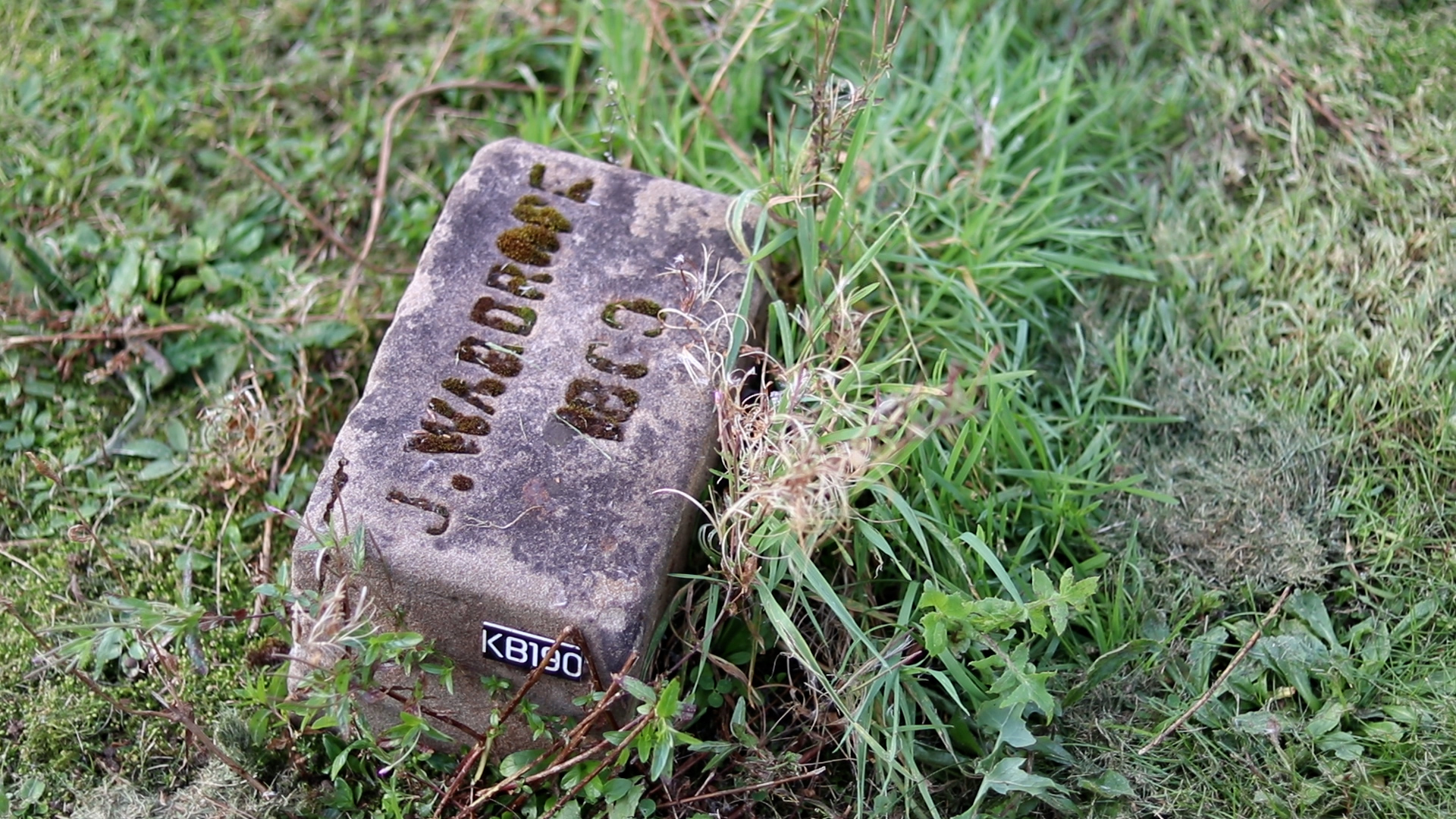
James Wardrop's Headstone at Bathgate, Old Kirk Cemetery

James Wardrop was known for his generosity in providing free medical advice to the poor, often seeing patients at his home during the mornings. However, he was also intolerant of deceit and took particular satisfaction in exposing those who sought to exploit his charitable nature.

On one occasion, Wardrop recounted that he had been called to attend a patient in St James’s Square. Upon returning home, he noticed an elderly man, shabbily dressed, alighting from a carriage bearing a coronet on its panels, a symbol indicating noble status. Wardrop recognised the man as one of his regular recipients of free medical advice. Waiting discreetly until the man turned the corner of Charles Street, he confirmed that the individual was, in fact, a titled nobleman, an Earl.

When the man later arrived for his appointment, Wardrop received him formally, addressing him by his correct title. The patient, taken by surprise, attempted to withdraw, but Wardrop prevented his departure. He rebuked the Earl for his deception and insisted he pay a guinea for each previous visit he had received under false pretences.

Sir William Knighton died in 1836. On the day of his death, his widow wrote to James Wardrop, conveying her late husband's wish to reconcile with him. In her letter, she stated:

“It was the earnest desire of my late dearest husband, towards the close of his illness, to have requested you to come to his bedside, in order that he might have expressed to you his entire good-will after the misunderstanding that occurred between you at the time of the late King’s illness, when hurry and anxiety of mind caused what you imagined an omission towards you.”

Following the death of King George IV in 1830, Wardrop remained professionally active and published several notable medical works over the next seven years. These included a second edition of Essays on the Morbid Anatomy of the Eye, a treatise On Blood-letting, a second edition of On Aneurism and its Cure, and On the Nature and Treatment of Diseases of the Heart. The latter was published in three editions (1837, 1851, and 1859).

A copy of the second edition of On the Nature and Treatment of Diseases of the Heart is held by the Royal College of Surgeons of Edinburgh. Remarkably, it remains uncut after 150 years and bears the inscription: “For the Royal College of Surgeons from the Author.” Another copy was presented to the University of St Andrews.

The book is also dedicated to James Young Simpson, reading:

“From the Author to James Simpson M.D. It is a particular pleasure to me to think, that it should have been on the same spot of that land as yourself wherein I drew the first breath of life!”

This dedication references their shared origins in the town Bathgate. Simpson had introduced the use of chloroform as an anaesthetic just four years earlier, in 1847.

Wardrop himself had received an honorary Doctor of Medicine degree from the University of St Andrews in 1834. He also contributed two sections to a Cyclopedia of Surgery, an ambitious project with several notable authors, which ceased publication after the letter ‘G’.

James Wardrop was also a noted art collector. In 1850, he donated two paintings to the newly established National Gallery of Scotland. In a letter accompanying the gift, he reflected on his connection to Scotland and the arts, stating:

“Having spent so many of my early days in Scotland, and been there taught the first elements of drawing by Professor Grahame, I naturally associate the enjoyments which the fine arts have throughout a long life afforded me, as well as the professional benefits I have derived from them, and I am therefore proud to be permitted to contribute, in the smallest degree, to my fellow countrymen that source of pleasure.”

In addition to an early portrait, James Wardrop was depicted in works by artists Thomas Musgrove Joy, held in the Scottish National Portrait Gallery, and Robert Frain. While the portraits do not overtly display it, Wardrop is believed to have had a divergent squint, with one eye—likely the left—appearing more prominent than the other. In later life, the cornea of that eye became opaque. It has been suggested that he was highly myopic in the affected eye and may have suffered a retinal detachment, a condition then referred to as "amaurotic cat’s eye," which he described in his Essays on the Morbid Anatomy of the Human Eye. This condition was not successfully treated until 1919, when Swiss ophthalmologist Jules Gonin pioneered surgical intervention.

By the 1850s, Wardrop had become blind and largely housebound, though he remained in good spirits and was known to be cheerful and conversational with visiting friends. He died at Charles Street off St James Square, London on 13 February 1869, shortly after the death of his wife. He was 87 years old.

At his request, he was buried in the Old Kirk in Bathgate, near the grave of his mother, who had died during his early childhood. His resting place is marked by a simple stone bearing the inscription: “J Wardrope 1869.”

== Works ==
In 1809, Wardrop published Observations on Fungus Haematodes or Soft Cancer in which he for the first time described as an entity a pediatric eye cancer now known as retinoblastoma; and, unknowingly, a uveal melanoma that he helped to enucleate and that later metastasized to the liver.

Wardrop was associated with Thomas Wakley in the founding of The Lancet in 1823, for which he first wrote savage articles and, later, witty and scurrilous lampoons in his column 'Intercepted Letters'. The letters, under the pseudonym "Brutus", were thinly disguised as by leading London surgeons, revealing their nepotism, venality and incompetence. There was enough truth in them to make the parodies sting.

Works written by Wardrop include:

- Cases of Movable Bodies Found in the Vaginal Coat of the Testis (1807)
- Essays on the Morbid Anatomy of the Human Eye (1808 - 1818, Vol. 1 & 2)
- Practical observations on the mode of making the incision of the cornea for the extraction of the cataract (1808)
- Observations on Fungus Haematodes or Soft Cancer (1809)
- Observations on the Effects of Evacuating the Aqueous Humour in Inflammation of the Eyes and on the Changes Produced in the Transparency of the Cornea, from the Increase or Diminution of the Contents of the Eyeball (1809)
- History of James Mitchell, a boy born deaf and blind, with an account of the operation performed for the recovery of his sight (1814)
- An Essay on Diseases of the Eye of the Horse, and on their Treatment (1819)
- Biographical Sketch of the late Matthew Baillie, M.D. (1824)
- Case of a lady born blind, who received sight at an advanced age by the formation of an artificial pupil (1826)
- On Aneurysm and its Cure by a New Operation, (1828) new edition 1835
- On Blood Letting (1830)
- On the Curative Effects of the Abstraction of Blood: with Rules for Employing both Local and General Blood‑letting in the Treatment of Diseases (1837)
- On the Nature and Treatment of Diseases of the Heart, Part I: (1837), Complete work later (1851); new edition 1859

== Family ==
In 1813 Wardrop married Margaret, daughter of Col. George L. Dalrymple of East Lothian and the widow of Captain Burn. They had four sons and a daughter.

== Bibliography ==
- Wardrop, James 1808. Essays on the morbid anatomy of the human eye.
- Wardrop, James 1809. Observations on Fungus Haematodes or Soft Cancer
