= Forrest Dewar =

Scottish surgeon (1748–1817)

Forrest Dewar FRCSEd (1 October 1748 – 9 September 1817) was a Scottish surgeon who served as President of the Royal College of Surgeons of Edinburgh for 1786 to 1788.

== Life ==
He was born on 1 October 1748 the son of John Dewar and Elizabeth Jean Forrest.

In 1773 Dewar was a founding member of the Aesculapian Club. In 1782 Dewar was one of the founding members of the Harveian Society of Edinburgh and served as President in 1790 and 1814. In 1783 he was living and working from the Luckenbooths next to St Giles Cathedral in Edinburgh.

In 1786 he is listed as a Manager of the Edinburgh Dispensary alongside Dr Benjamin Bell, James Hunter and Thomas Elder.

In 1786 he replaced Dr Thomas Hay as President of the Royal College of Surgeons of Edinburgh and he was succeeded in turn in 1788 by Dr Andrew Wardrop.

In 1801 he is recorded as living at 9 Hunter Square, off the Royal Mile in Edinburgh's Old Town. In the same year he appears as an expert witness in the court case Rollo v Irving.

In 1816 he appears contesting a case against Young & Co in the High Court, heard by Robert Craigie, Lord Craigie, disputing rights to build in the rear garden areas along Princes Street.

He died on 9 September 1817 at his home, 59 Princes Street. He is buried in Greyfriars Kirkyard.

== Family ==
In 1789 he married Anne Campbell Stewart. They had four daughters and one son.

His son John Dewar married Elizabeth Burnet Innes, the illegitimate daughter of Gilbert Innes of Stow.
