= John Richard Quain =

Sir John Richard Quain (1816–1876) was an Irish barrister and judge in England.

== Life ==
The youngest son of Richard Quain of Ratheahy, County Cork, by his second wife, Margaret, daughter of Andrew Mahoney, he was born at Ratheahy in 1816. Jones Quain and Richard Quain were his half-brothers, and the physician Sir Richard Quain was his cousin. He was educated at Göttingen, and at University College, London, where he won many prizes. In 1839 he graduated LL.B. at London, and was elected to the university law scholarship. He became a fellow of University College in 1843, and was for several years an examiner in law to the university of London. After reading in the chambers of Thomas Chitty, and practising as a special pleader for a time, he was called to the bar at the Middle Temple on 30 May 1851.

Joining the Northern Circuit, Quain obtained a considerable practice. In 1866 he became a Queen's Counsel, and in 1867 was made Attorney-General for the county palatine of Durham and a bencher of the Middle Temple. He was appointed a judge of the Queen's Bench in December 1871, was appointed serjeant and took his seat at the beginning of Hilary term 1872, and was knighted. His health failed early in 1876, and, after some months of intermittent illness, he died at his house, 32 Cavendish Square, London, on 12 September and was buried at Finchley. He was unmarried. His law library was presented to University College, London, by his brother Richard in 1876.
