= Corrugator cutis ani muscle =

Muscle of the human anus

Details

Identifiers
- Latin: musculus corrugator cutis ani
- TA2: 3021

The corrugator cutis ani is a muscle of the human body, also known as the Ellis' muscle, after the anatomist George Viner Ellis.

Around the anus is a thin stratum of involuntary muscle fiber, which radiates from the orifice. Medially the fibers fade off into the submucous tissue, while laterally they blend with the true skin. By its contraction it raises the skin into ridges around the margin of the anus. The name of this muscle is primarily limited to older texts.
