= William Thomson (physician) =

Scottish medical author

William Thomson MD (3 July 1802 – 12 May 1852) was a Scottish medical author. He was professor of medicine at the University of Glasgow.

== Life ==
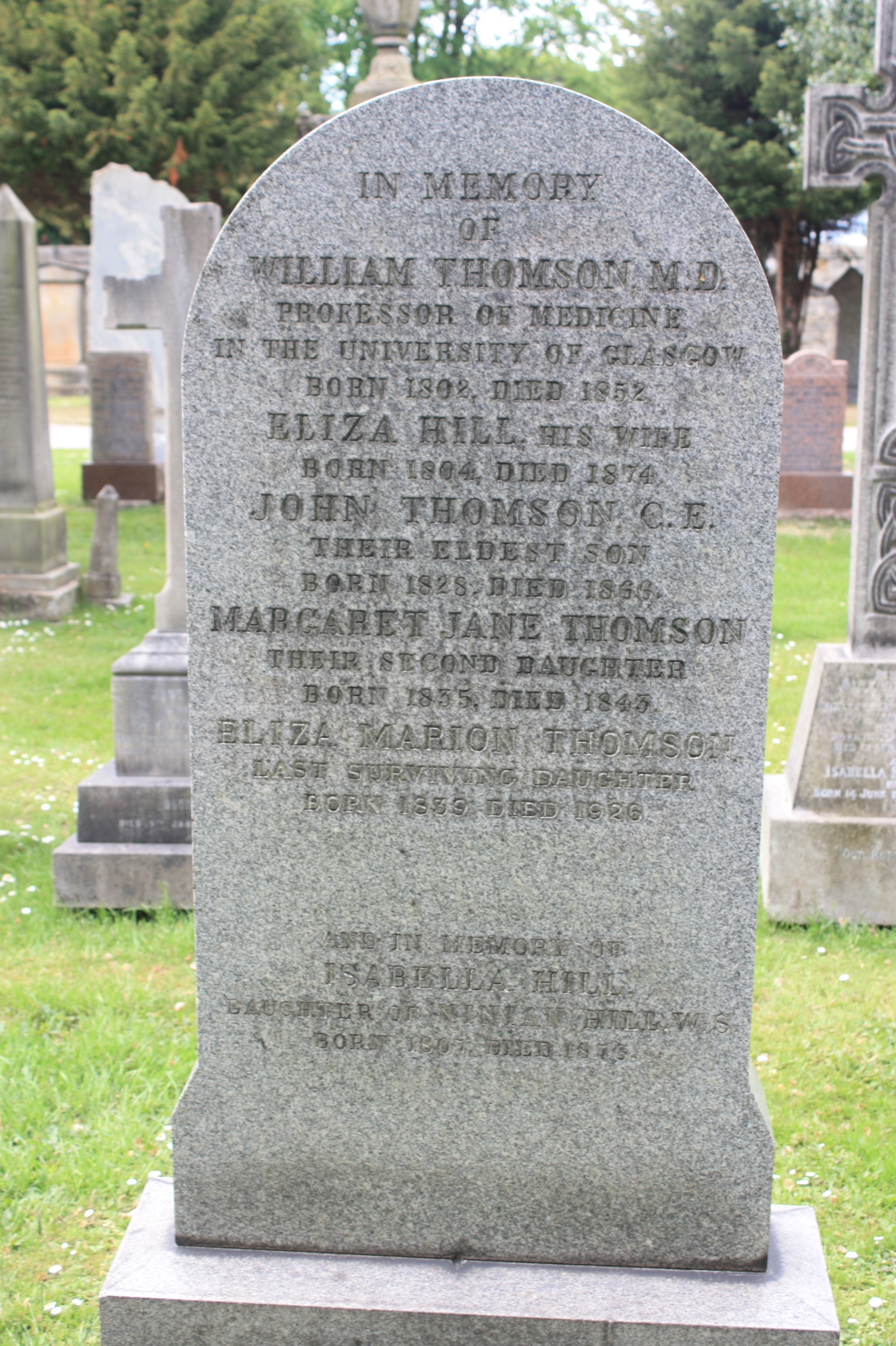
Grave of Thomson at Dean Cemetery

Thomson was born on 3 July 1802, the second son of Margaret Crawford Gordon, first wife of Dr John Thomson. They lived at Merchant Street, close to Greyfriars Kirk in Edinburgh's Old Town.

He was educated at the High School in Edinburgh. In 1818 he began studying medicine at the University of Edinburgh. He studied at the University of Glasgow from 1821 to 1822. He spent the summer of 1822 with Sir Robert Carswell in France, visiting both Paris and Lyon on a series of observations on human dissections, to aid Carswell in his work with Thomson's father.

In 1825 he settled in Edinburgh, living at 80 George Street in Edinburgh's New Town.

He began lecturing in medicine and physiology at the University of Edinburgh in 1826. During this period he also assisted his father during pathology lectures. From 1830, following a drop in his father's health he took on all roles himself. He received his doctorate (MD) in 1831. In 1840 he became official Senior Physician at the Edinburgh Royal Infirmary. In 1841 he was appointed Professor of Medicine at the University of Glasgow. During his 11 years at the university, he also became a director of Glasgow Royal Infirmary and Gartnavel Mental Asylum. An outbreak of cholera at the asylum was addressed by Thomson; however, as a result of this process Thomson caught the disease.

He went to Edinburgh to consult his medical friends on his condition, but died of cholera a few days later, on 12 May 1852. He was buried in Dean Cemetery in western Edinburgh. The grave lies in the south-east section, just to the side of David Octavius Hill, who appears to have been his wife's cousin.

== Publications ==
- On the Black Deposit on the Lungs of Miners
- Sloughing of Some Portions of the Intestinal Tube (1835)
- A Practical Treatise on the Diseases of the Liver and Billary Passage (1841)

== Family ==
William was married to Eliza Hill (1804-1874), daughter of Ninian Hill WS. They had six children. Their son John Thomson (1828-1866) gained fame as a civil engineer laying Transatlantic telegraph cables.

He was half-brother to Allen Thomson, son of his father's second wife, who was also an eminent physician. Allen married William's sister-in-law, Ninian Jane Hill. His nephew, through this half-brother, was John Millar Thomson.
