= Andrew Wardrop =

Scottish surgeon

Andrew Wardrop FRCSEd (c.1740–1789) was an 18th-century Scottish surgeon who served as President of the Royal College of Surgeons of Edinburgh for the period 1788 to 1789.

== Life ==
In 1783 he was living at 2 Princes Street then a newly built house in Edinburgh's New Town.

He worked alongside Benjamin Bell and James Russell in Edinburgh and taught anatomy and surgery at the University of Edinburgh.

In 1788 he succeeded Dr Forrest Dewar as President of the Royal College of Surgeons of Edinburgh. In 1790 he was succeeded by William Inglis.

He last appears in Edinburgh Street Directories in 1789 living at 2 South Hanover Street in Edinburgh's New Town. He is presumed to have died during his presidency, causing the college to call on the services of William Inglis (who already had experience as President).

== Family ==
He was great uncle to the eminent surgeon James Wardrop.

He was father to his namesake Dr Andrew Wardrop FRSE (1755-1823) a founder of the Royal Society of Edinburgh in 1783.
