= Aldersgate Medical School =

Medical school in London, England

The Aldersgate Medical School was a medical school in east London, in existence from about 1825 to 1848. One of many private medical schools of the period, it had popular lecturers on its staff, and proved a serious rival to St. Bartholomew's Hospital as a teaching institution.

== Foundation ==
The Aldersgate School was set up in 1825 by Frederick Tyrrell; the founding group included William Lawrence, William Coulson and others. At that point the shared medical school of Guy's Hospital and St. Thomas's Hospital was divided. Tyrrell lectured at the Aldersgate School, but later took a position at St. Thomas's, and was no longer involved with the Aldersgate school. Lawrence was also an early supporter of the school, lecturing on surgery in 1826–7; but he withdrew after taking a position at St. Bartholomew's Hospital. Lawrence was a reformer, and the background was his opposition to an 1824 regulation of the Royal College of Surgeons aiming to limit the number of medical schools that a surgical student could attend. He saw this measure as intended to force students into the hospital medical schools. Jones Quain taught anatomy alongside Lawrence; but he had to drop out following a dissection wound.

Henry Clutterbuck of the nearby Aldersgate Dispensary moved his lectures to the school in 1826. In the same year Peter Roget was brought in to lecture on physiology.

== Staff ==
James Wardrop, one of the founders, lectured on surgery alongside Lawrence, and provided some continuity. The school retained a reputation for radicalism, and sympathy with French theories.

In the 1830s prominent replacement lecturers were found for the initial ones. Frederic Carpenter Skey was in dispute with Lawrence at St. Bartholomew's, and taught surgery for a decade. The physician James Hope from the mid-1830s combined lecturing at the Aldersgate School with other positions. The pharmacologist Jonathan Pereira came in to lecture on materia medica. Robert Edmond Grant lectured on anatomy, and Thomas Hodgkin on pathology.

With the eventual decline of the school in the 1840s, some of its staff moved to St. Bartholomew's medical school. They included James Paget.

== Student ==
- William John Little
