= Thomas Morton (surgeon) =

English surgeon

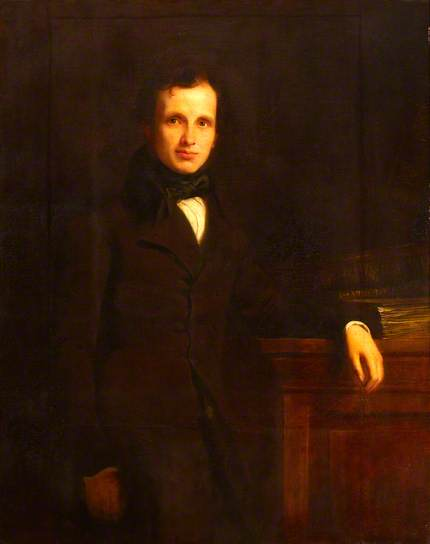
Thomas Morton, portrait by his brother Andrew

Thomas Morton (1813–1849) was an English surgeon.

== Life ==
Born 20 March 1813 in the parish of St. Andrew, Newcastle upon Tyne, he was the youngest son of Joseph Morton, a master mariner, and brother of Andrew Morton the portrait painter. He was apprenticed to James Church, house-surgeon to the Newcastle Infirmary, and then in 1832 became a medical student at University College London.

Admitted a member of the Royal College of Surgeons of England on 24 July 1835, Morton was appointed house-surgeon at the North London Hospital under Samuel Cooper, unusually being reappointed when after one year of office. In 1836 he was made demonstrator of anatomy jointly with Mr. Ellis, a post he held for nine years. In 1842 he became assistant surgeon to the hospital, the first student of the college to join the staff.

In 1848 Morton was appointed full surgeon to the hospital on the resignation of James Syme. He was also surgeon to the Queen's Bench prison in succession to Cooper, his father-in-law. He was a candidate for the professorship of surgery at University College when James Arnott was appointed.

Morton committed suicide on 29 October 1849, at his house in Woburn Place, London.

== Works ==
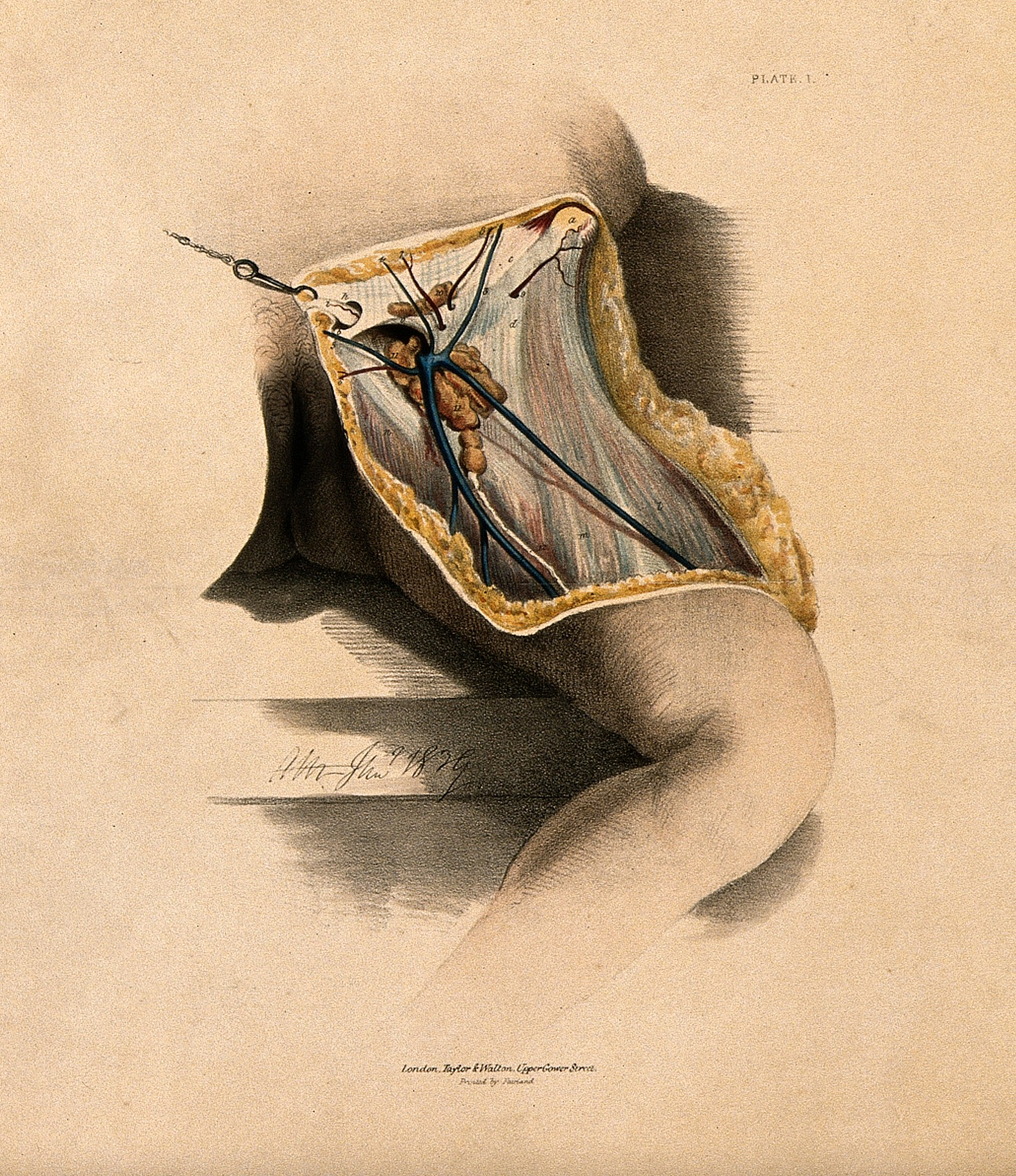
"A dissection of the groin, showing the fascia, blood-vessels", illustration to The Surgical Anatomy of the Groin (1839) by Thomas Morton and William Cadge

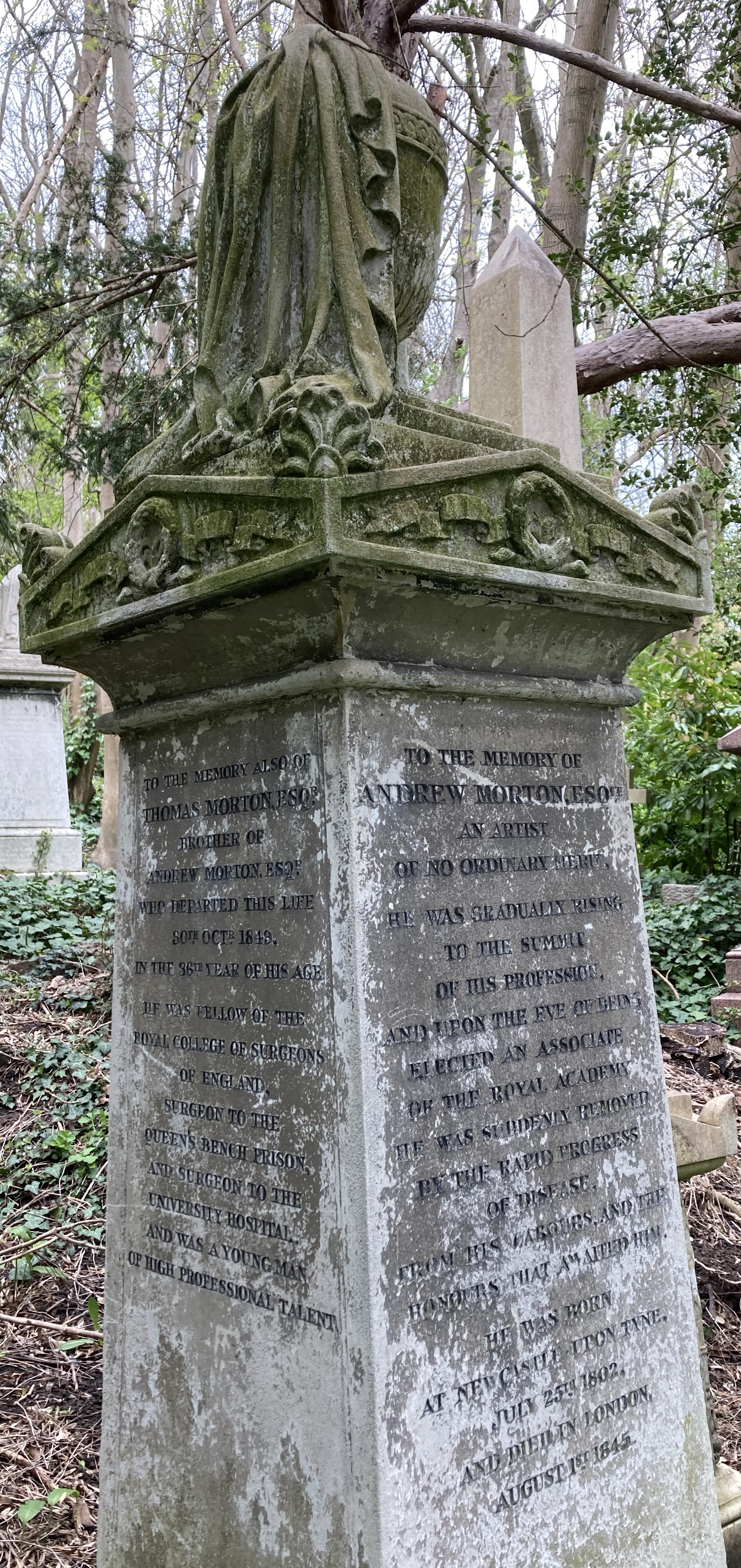
Grave of Thomas Morton in Highgate Cemetery

Morton's works were:

- Surgical Anatomy of the Perinseum, London, 1838.
- Surgical Anatomy of the Groin, London, 1839.
- Surgical Anatomy of Inguinal Herniæ, London, 1841.
- Anatomical Engravings, London, 1845.
- Surgical Anatomy, with William Cadge, London, 1850.

They were illustrated by his brother Andrew Morton, and lithographed by William Fairland.

== Family ==
Morton married Mary Ann, the only daughter of Samuel Cooper, the author of the Surgical Dictionary, and they had one daughter.

He is buried with his brother Andrew on the west side of Highgate Cemetery.

== Notes ==
Attribution

This article incorporates text from a publication now in the public domain: Lee, Sidney, ed. (1894). "Morton, Thomas (1813-1849)". Dictionary of National Biography. Vol. 39. London: Smith, Elder & Co.
