= Richard Quain (Irish physician) =

Sir Richard Quain
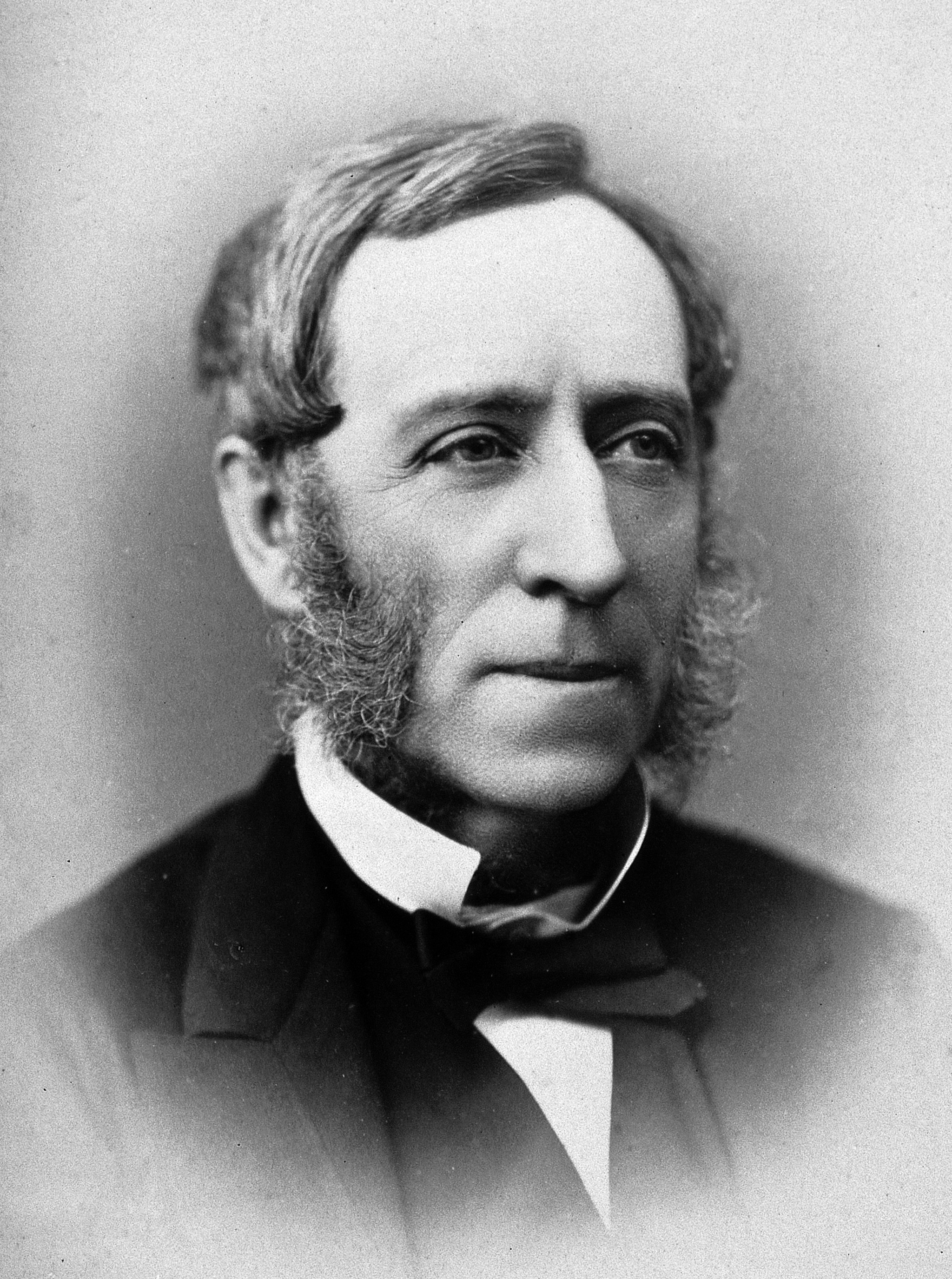
- Sir Richard Quain in 1881
- Born: 30 October 1816; Mallow, County Cork
- Died: 13 March 1898 (aged 81)
- Education: University College London
- Occupation: Physician
- Known for: Quain's Dictionary of Medicine

Sir Richard Quain, 1st Baronet, FRS, FRCP (30 October 1816 – 13 March 1898) was an Irish physician.

== Life ==
Quain was born at Mallow-on-the-Blackwater, County Cork and died in Harley Street, London.

Quain was the eldest child of John Quain of Carraig Dhúin (Carrigoon), Cork and Mary, daughter of Michael Burke of Mallow, Cork. He was sent to the Diocesan School at Cloyne for his early education and then, aged 15, apprenticed to the surgeon-apothecary Fraser in Limerick for five years. In 1837 he enrolled in medicine at the University College London where his cousins, Jones Quain, the anatomist and author of Quain's Elements of Anatomy, and Richard Quain, FRCS, later the president of the Royal College of Surgeons, held teaching posts. He graduated M.B. with honours in 1840.

Quain married Isabella Agnes Wray (21 June 1828 – 26 October 1891), the daughter of George Wray, on 31 January 1854 at Hampstead. He was a great-grandfather of author Ian Fleming.

== Career ==
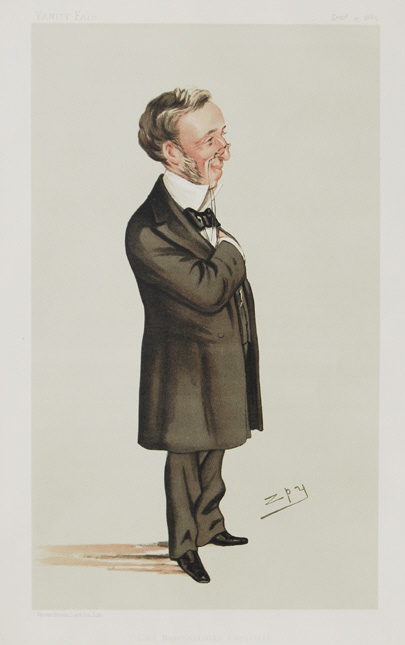
Caricature of Sir Richard Quain in Vanity Fair

Quain received his early education at Cloyne, and was then apprenticed to a surgeon-apothecary in Limerick. In 1837, he entered University College London, where he graduated as M.B. with honours in 1840, and as MD (gold medal) in 1842. Six years later, he was chosen to be an assistant-physician to the Brompton Hospital for Diseases of the Chest. He retained his connection with that institution until his death, first as full physician (1855), and subsequently as consulting physician (1875).

In 1842, Quain received the gold medal for achievements in physiology and comparative anatomy, and later he became successively house surgeon and house physician at the University College Hospital and commenced practice in London, being in particular a protégé of professor Charles James Blasius Williams (1805–1889). He soon had a busy practice, numbering an important clientele, with contacts to the most highly recognised persons.

In 1848, Quain was appointed assistant physician at the Brompton Hospital for Diseases of the Chest. He was raised to full physician in 1855 and was made consulting physician in 1875. He held the same rank at the Seamen's Hospital, Greenwich, and the Royal Hospital for Consumption in Ventnor.

In 1846, Quain became a member of the Royal College of Physicians and a fellow in 1851. In 1850, he vacated the Chair of Anatomy at the University College London and was succeeded by George Viner Ellis. In 1862 he served as a member of the council of the Royal College of Physicians, 1867 censor, 1877 senior censor. He was an early member of the Pathological Society of London in 1862, being elected its president in 1869. He was also a fellow and vice-president of the Royal Medical and Chirurgical Society and the Medical Society of London, as well as President of the Harveian Society of London (1853) and fellow of the Royal Statistical Society. He was elected a Fellow of the Royal Society in 1871. His address to the Society was On the mechanism by which the first sound of heart is produced.

Quain became a fellow of the Royal College of Physicians in 1851, and filled almost every post of honour it could offer, except the presidency, in the contest for which he was beaten by Sir Andrew Clark in 1888.

In 1881, he was asked by Queen Victoria to attend prime minister Benjamin Disraeli during his last few days.

Quain later, in 1890, became physician-extraordinary to the Queen, and was created a baronet of Harley Street in the County of London and of Carrigoon in Mallow in the County of Cork the following year, on 10 February 1891.

Quain sat on the Royal Commission on Rinderpest (cattle plague) in 1865.

Quain was the author of several memoirs, dealing for the most part with disorders of the heart, but his name will be best remembered by the Dictionary of Medicine, the preparation of which occupied him from 1875 to 1882 (2nd edition, 1894; 3rd, 1902).

== Publications ==
Quain's article on fatty disease of the heart was published in 1850, but probably his major contribution was his editorship the multi-authored textbook of medicine, Quain's Dictionary of Medicine, which became the bible of all medical practitioners in the United Kingdom. It was published in 1882 after seven years of meticulous preparation by Quain. The work filled a gap in contemporary medical writing and sold over 30,000 copies; a second edition followed in 1894.

Quain was very prominent in affairs of medicine, being a censor and council member of the Royal College of Physicians and was narrowly defeated by Sir Andrew Clark in 1888 in the election for the position of president. He became physician-extraordinary to Queen Victoria in 1890 and was created a baronet in the following year.

He was active on many committees but probably the most important of these contributions was the Royal Commission to enquire into the nature and causes and methods of prevention of cattle plague. This commission included a number of famous people such as Henry Bence Jones (1813–1873) and Edmond Alexander Parkes (1819–1876). Quain vehemently sided with the section that wanted the extermination of the plague at any price and was opposed in this by a number of the members of the commission, including Bence Jones. Quain's work and particularly letters he wrote to newspapers and magazines turned the tide and the recommendations to exterminate were carried out with success.

Appointed a Crown nominee in 1863, Quain became chairman of its Pharmacopoeia Committee in 1874 and took a major part in the preparation of the Additions to the British Pharmacopoeia of 1867 (1874) and of the British Pharmacopoeias of 1885 and 1898. He was chosen as a member of the Senate of London University in 1860 and was one of the organisers of the Brown Institution.

Quain was regarded universally as a fine physician, but apparently achieved his results by intuition and instinct rather than by analysis of the patient's problems. "Utility and progress" was his favourite motto. Quain's renown as a physician was due not only to the sound commonsense that he brought to bear in diagnosis, but also to the good-humoured geniality that he showed to patients and friends,

He was famous for his epigrammatic quotes, and regarded as a fine raconteur and club member of the Garrick and Athenaeum, his broad Irish accent adding colour to the stories he told.

== Publications ==
- A Dictionary of Medicine. London, 1882. 3rd edition, Longmans Green, 1894. New York: D. Appleton and Company, 1883.
- A Dictionary of medicine : including general pathology, general therapeutics, hygiene and the diseases of women and children; by various writers; ed. by Richard Quain; assisted by Frederick Thomas Roberts and J. Mitchell Bruce; with an American appendix by Samuel Treat Armstrong. New York : D. Appleton and Co., 1894

== Terms ==
- Quain's fatty heart — Fatty degeneration of the muscle fibres of the heart.

== Arms ==
Coat of arms of Richard Quain

Notes
Granted 4 February 1881 by Sir John Bernard Burke, Ulster King of Arms.
Crest
Out of the battlements of a tower Proper a demi-lion rampant Or charged on the shoulder with a trefoil Vert and holding between the paws a battleaxe also Proper blade Gold.
Escutcheon
Argent a chevron engrailed Azure in chief two fers de moline Gules and issuant from the base a rock covered with daisies Proper.
Motto
Avorum Non Immemor

== Notes ==
- Power, D'Arcy (1901). "Quain, Richard (1816-1898)" . In Lee, Sidney (ed.). Dictionary of National Biography (1st supplement). London: Smith, Elder & Co.

Baronetage of the United Kingdom
New creation	Baronet (of Harley Street and Carrigoon); 1891–1898	Extinct
Preceded by Brooks baronets	Quain baronets of Harley Street and Carrigoon; 10 February 1891	Succeeded by Kennard baronets
