= Richard Quain (English surgeon) =

British writer

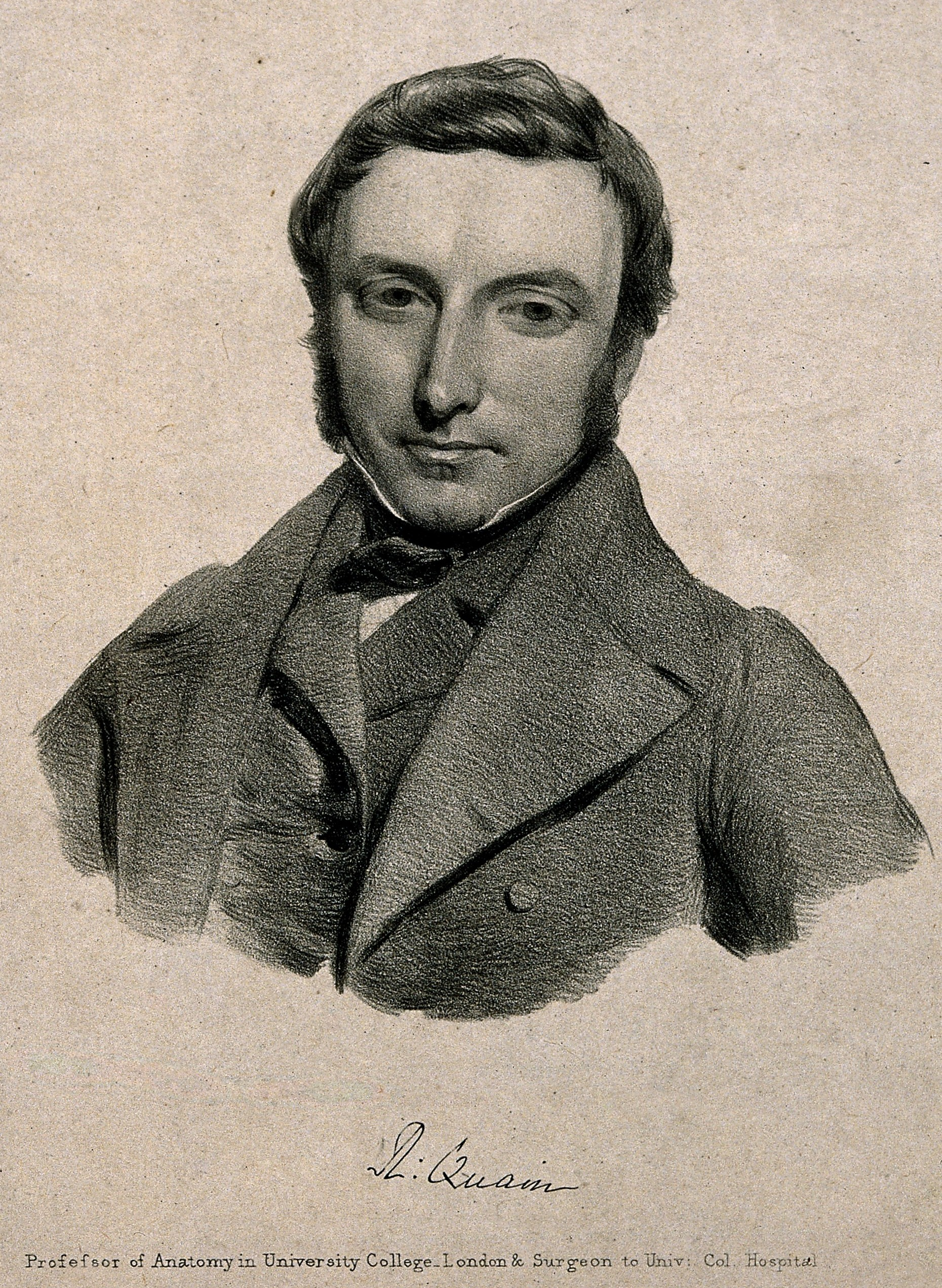
Portrait. Credit: Wellcome Library

Richard Quain (July 1800 – 15 September 1887) was an Irish anatomist and surgeon, born at Fermoy, Ireland, a brother of Jones Quain. He studied medicine in London and in Paris. He was appointed demonstrator in 1828 and professor of anatomy in 1832 at the University of London (now University College London), resigning in 1850, and assistant surgeon in 1834 and surgeon in 1848 to the North London Hospital, from which he resigned in 1866. He was president of the Royal College of Surgeons in 1868.

== Biography ==
Quain, born at Fermoy, co. Cork, in July 1800, was third son of Richard Quain of Ratheahy, co. Cork, by his first wife. Jones Quain was his full brother, and Sir John Richard Quain was his half-brother. Richard received his early education at Adair's school at Fermoy, and, after serving an apprenticeship to a surgeon in Ireland, came to London to pursue the more scientific part of his professional studies at the Aldersgate School of Medicine, under the supervision of his brother Jones. He afterwards went to Paris, where he attended the lectures of James Richard Bennett, a private lecturer on anatomy and an Irish friend of his father. In 1828, when Bennett was appointed a demonstrator of anatomy in the newly constituted school of the university of London (now University College) Quain assisted his patron in the duties of his new office. Bennett died in 1830, and Quain then became senior demonstrator of anatomy, Sir Charles Bell at that time occupying the professorial chair of general anatomy and physiology. When Bell resigned this post, Richard Quain was appointed professor of descriptive anatomy in 1832, Erasmus Wilson, Thomas Morton, Viner Ellis, and John Marshall successively acting as his demonstrators. He held the office until 1850.

Quain was admitted a member of the Royal College of Surgeons of England on 18 January 1828, and in 1834 he was appointed the first assistant surgeon to University College, or the North London, Hospital. He succeeded, after a stormy progress, to the office of full surgeon and special professor of clinical surgery in 1848, resigned in 1866, and was then appointed consulting surgeon to the hospital and emeritus professor of clinical surgery in its medical school.

When the fellowship of the Royal College of Surgeons was established by royal charter in 1843, Quain was one of those selected for the honour. He was admitted on 11 December 1843 and he was elected a Fellow of the Royal Society on 29 February 1844. He became a member of the council of the College of Surgeons in 1854, was a member of the court of examiners in 1865, and chairman of the board of examiners in midwifery in 1867. He was elected president of the college in 1868, and in the following year delivered the Hunterian oration. From 1870 to 1876 he represented the Royal College of Surgeons of England in the General Council of Education and Registration, and at the time of his death was one of Queen Victoria's surgeons-extraordinary. He died on 15 September 1887, and is buried at Finchley.

He married, in 1859, Ellen, viscountess Midleton, widow of the fifth viscount, but had no children by her. He left the bulk of his fortune, amounting to about 75,000l., "for the promotion and encouragement, in connection with University College, London, of general education in modern languages (especially the English language and composition in that language) and in natural science." The Quain professorship of English language and literature and the Quain studentships and prizes were founded in accordance with this bequest.

== Works ==
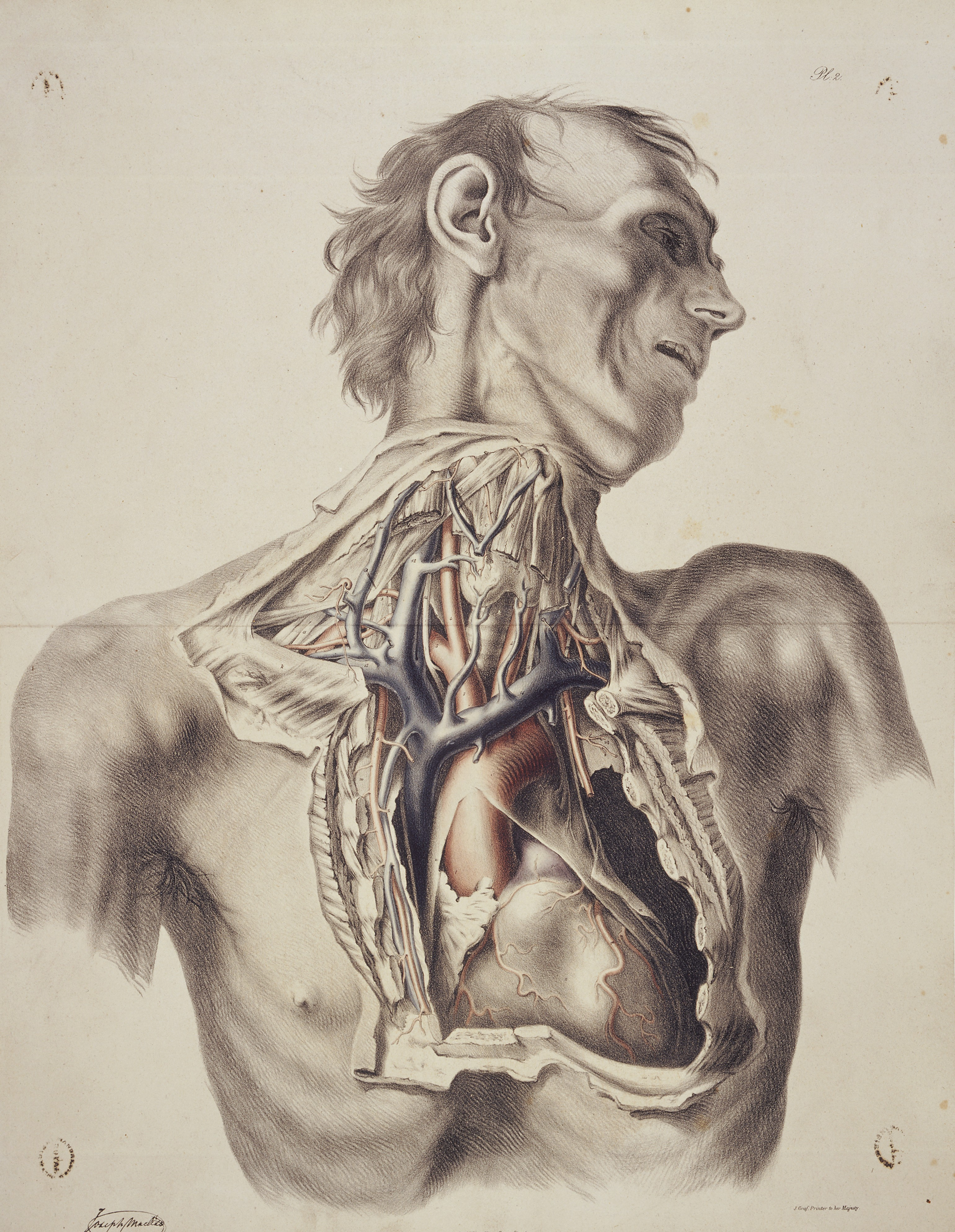
Plate 2 of Richard Quain's The anatomy of the arteries of the human body

Quain was a cautious rather than a demonstrative surgeon, yet on all matters of clinical detail he was practical, sensible, and painstaking. He had the interest of the profession strongly at heart, and constantly insisted upon the necessity of a preliminary liberal education for all its members. His character, however, was marred by the violence of his party feelings, his jealousy, and the readiness with which he imputed improper motives to all who differed from him.

Besides editing his brother's Elements of Anatomy in 1848, Quain published:

1. The Anatomy of the Arteries of the Human Body, with its Applications to Pathology and Operative Surgery, in Lithographic Drawings with Practical Commentaries, folio, London, 1844. Explanation of the Plates, 8vo, London. The splendid drawings were executed by Joseph Maclise, F.R.C.S., brother of Daniel Maclise, R.A. The explanation of the plates was arranged by Richard Quain, M.B. (later Sir Richard Quain, bart., F.R.S.) The recorded facts illustrating the history of the arterial system were deduced from observations conducted upon 1,040 subjects.
2. The Diseases of the Rectum, plates, 8vo, London, 1854; 2nd edit. 1855.
3. Clinical Lectures, 8vo, London, 1884.

A life-size half-length in oils, painted by George Richmond, R.A., is in the secretary's office at the Royal College of Surgeons in England. A bust, by Thomas Woolner, is in the council room of the Royal College of Surgeons; and a quarto lithographic plate, by Thomas Bridgford, A.R.H.A., is in the possession of the Royal Medical and Chirurgical Society.
