= John Millar Thomson =

British chemist

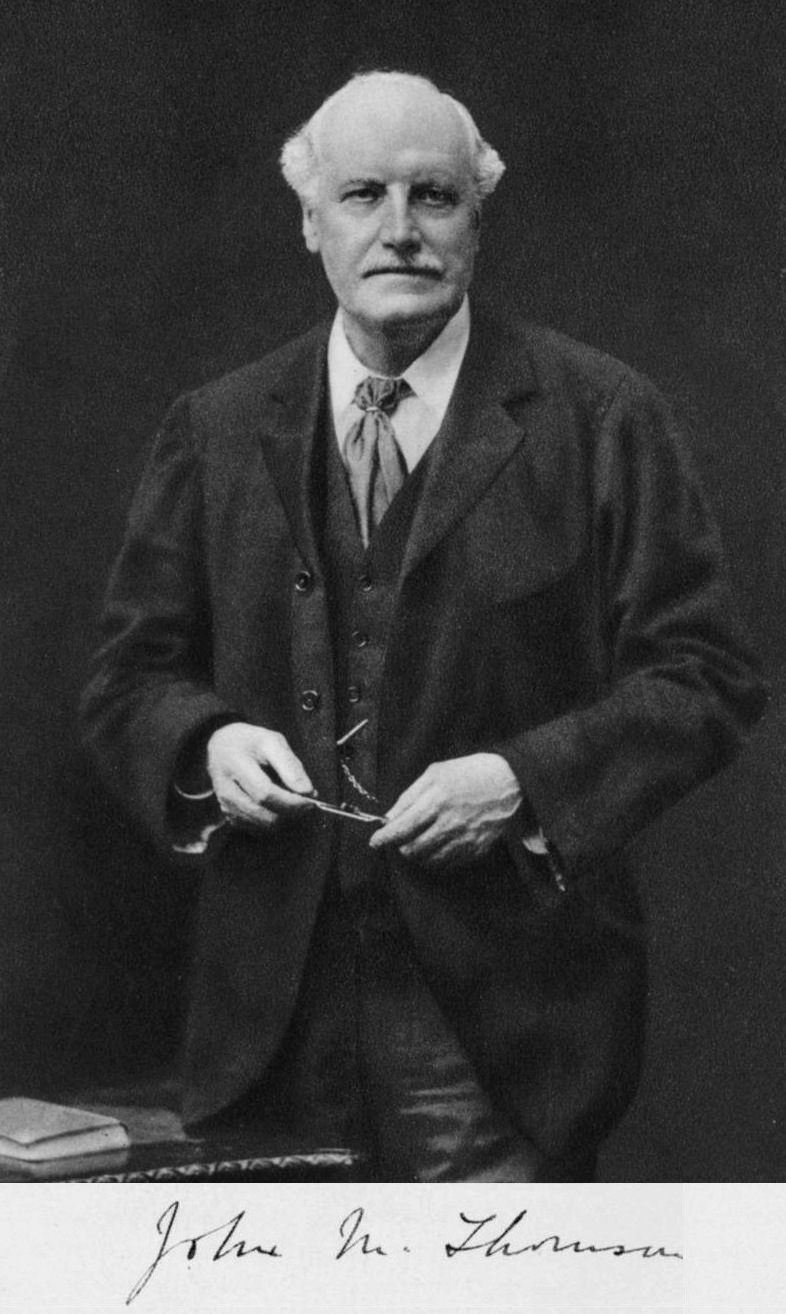
- Born: 29 March 1849; Glasgow, Scotland
- Died: 18 April 1933 (aged 84)
- Education: University of Glasgow
- Scientific career
- Workplaces: University of Glasgow, King's College London

Prof John Millar Thomson PIC FRS FRSE LLD (7 March 1849 – 22 March 1933) was a British chemist who held various leading positions with British chemical societies and was the vice-principal of King's College London. He was President of the Institute of Chemistry from 1900 to 1903.

== Biography ==
Thomson was born in the precincts of the old college of Glasgow, the only child of Allen Thomson, professor of anatomy and his wife, Ninian Jane Hill. His family had been connected with the University of Glasgow since 1761, when his great-grandfather, John Millar, was a professor of law. Other members of the family held chairs in mathematics, philosophy, medicine and anatomy, pathology, and military surgery at the University of Glasgow or other Scottish universities. Because of the family connections, from early boyhood, Thomson was in contact with notable people in academic circles. He regularly accompanied his father on various administrative duties and foreign trips, providing technical assistance and taking notes. This started an interest in architectural matters, which he retained all his life, eventually becoming an accomplished civil architect.

He was educated at the Glasgow High School and then studied at the University of Glasgow. He took the usual curriculum in arts, and then entered the faculty of medicine, but later changed to chemistry. He worked in a chemistry laboratory from 1866 to 1871, being appointed assistant to Professor Anderson in 1869. In 1868 he came to London to attend demonstrations by William Allen Miller and Charles Loudon Bloxam at King's College London. He returned to Glasgow in 1870 to assume a position of assistant demonstrator with Bloxam in early 1871. However, as the senior demonstrator was seriously ill in those years, Thomson took over his duties and was promoted to senior demonstrator in 1879. From 1880 until 1887, in addition to his work at King's College, he was also lectured in chemistry at Queen's College and became a professor in that college. During that time, he led the Chemical Department at King's College and carried out many studies on crystallisation and supersaturated solutions. His other contributions were to the composition and properties of ancient glasses, the chemistry of pigments, putrefaction and antisepsis, the chemistry of building materials, and the composition and optical properties of double salts of nickel and cobalt. He co-edited several editions of Bloxam’s Chemistry, Inorganic and Organic.

He was elected a Fellow of the Royal Society of Edinburgh in 1880. His proposers were John Young Buchanan, Alexander Crum Brown, Alexander Dickson and Sir Andrew Douglas Maclagan. He was elected a Fellow of the Royal Society in 1897 and received the honorary degree of LLD from the University of Glasgow in 1898.

Although he was much occupied with his own teaching and experimental work, Thomson was also a dedicated amateur photographer and actor with the Dramatic Society of King's College. He taught the principles and practice of photography to the engineering students of the college and carried out experimental studies of photographic processes.

Being the head of the Chemistry Department at King's College, in 1905, Thomson was offered the vacated post of vice-principal, which he held until retirement in 1914. He was an Honorary Fellow of King's and Queen's Colleges, and, in recognition of his services to chemical education, a medal was instituted in his honour to be awarded to the most distinguished chemistry students of King's College. Thomson also acted as Secretary of the Chemical Section of the Royal Society of Arts from 1879 to 1886, a Member of Council of the Society for four periods, honorary treasurer for five years, and vice-president in 1913. He served on the Council of the Chemical Society for four periods, as honorary secretary of the society from 1883 to 1893, and as senior secretary from 1893 to 1898; he also occupied the position of vice-president from 1898 to 1901, and 1923 to 1926. Thomson did not confine his activities in the Chemical Society to the purely administrative side; he served on the Library Committee of the Society and was chairman of that committee from 1905 to 1924. Thomson was elected a fellow of the Institute of Chemistry in 1878, served as a member of council for four periods, as a vice-president for three periods, as an examiner for five years, as honorary secretary for one year, as honorary registrar for six years, as a censor for twelve years, and as president for three years (1900–1903).
