= Samuel Cooper (surgeon) =

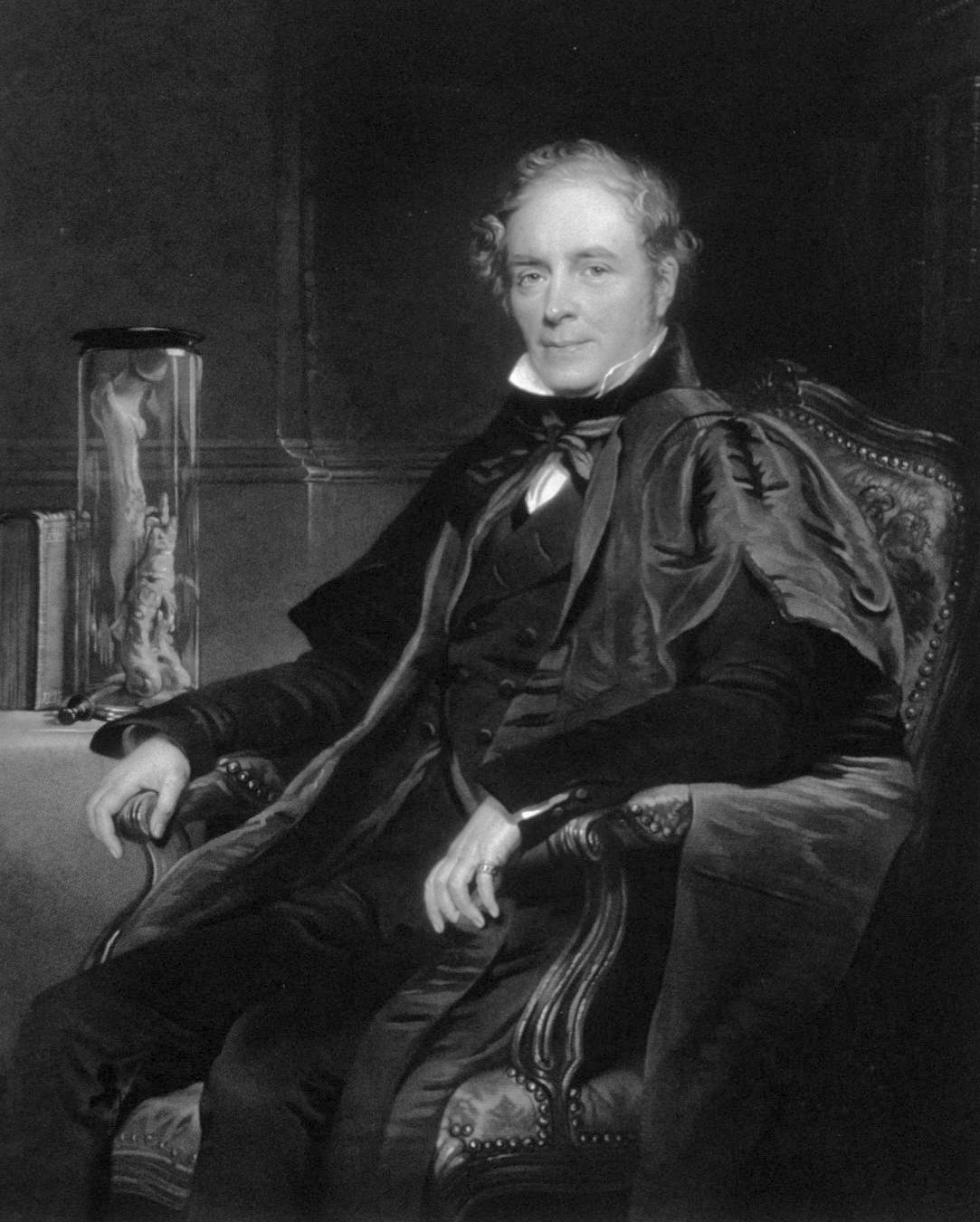
- Samuel Cooper 1840, Andrew Morton
- Born: September 1780
- Died: 2 December 1848
- Occupation: Surgeon
- Known for: Surgical Dictionary

Samuel Cooper FRS (September 1780 – 2 December 1848) was an English surgeon and medical writer. He published a Surgical Dictionary which went through many editions.

== Biography ==
Cooper was born in September 1780. His father, who had made a fortune in the West Indies, died when his three sons were still young. The eldest, George, became a judge of the supreme court in Madras, and was knighted. The second, Samuel, was educated by Dr. Charles Burney at Greenwich, and in 1800 entered St. Bartholomew's Hospital. In 1803 he became a Member of the Royal College of Surgeons, and settled in Golden Square. In 1806 he gained the Jacksonian prize at the College of Surgeons for the best essay on Diseases of the Joints. He then began writing about surgery, for which he achieved a reputation, with his books going to several editions. His book (1840) "First Lines of Theory and Practice of Surgery" was the first formal acknowledgement of advanced melanoma as untreatable. He stated that the only chance for a cure depends upon the early removal of the disease (i.e., early excision of the malignant mole.) More than one and a half centuries later, this situation remains largely unchanged. (London: Longman, Orme, Brown, Green and Longman)

After his wife's death, Cooper in 1813 entered the army as surgeon, and served at the battle of Waterloo. Retiring on the conclusion of peace, he devoted his attention to editing the successive editions of his two principal works, and also gained a considerable surgical practice. In 1827 he became a member of the council of the College of Surgeons, and delivered the Hunterian oration in 1834. From 1831 to 1848 he was surgeon to University College Hospital and professor of surgery in the college. In 1845 he was elected president of the College of Surgeons, and in 1846 Fellow of the Royal Society.

Cooper died of gout on 2 December 1848.

== Works ==
- Cataract, 1805
- First lines of Surgery, 1807
- Surgical Dictionary, 1809 This was translated into French, German, and Italian, and several times republished in America.
- Editor of the third and fourth editions of Dr Mason Good's Study of Medicine, 1822.

For Rees's Cyclopædia he contributed articles on surgery, but the topics are not known.

== Family ==
In 1810 Cooper married a Miss Cranstoun, but she died in the following year, leaving a daughter, afterwards married to Thomas Morton, surgeon to University College Hospital.
