= Jones Quain =

Irish anatomist

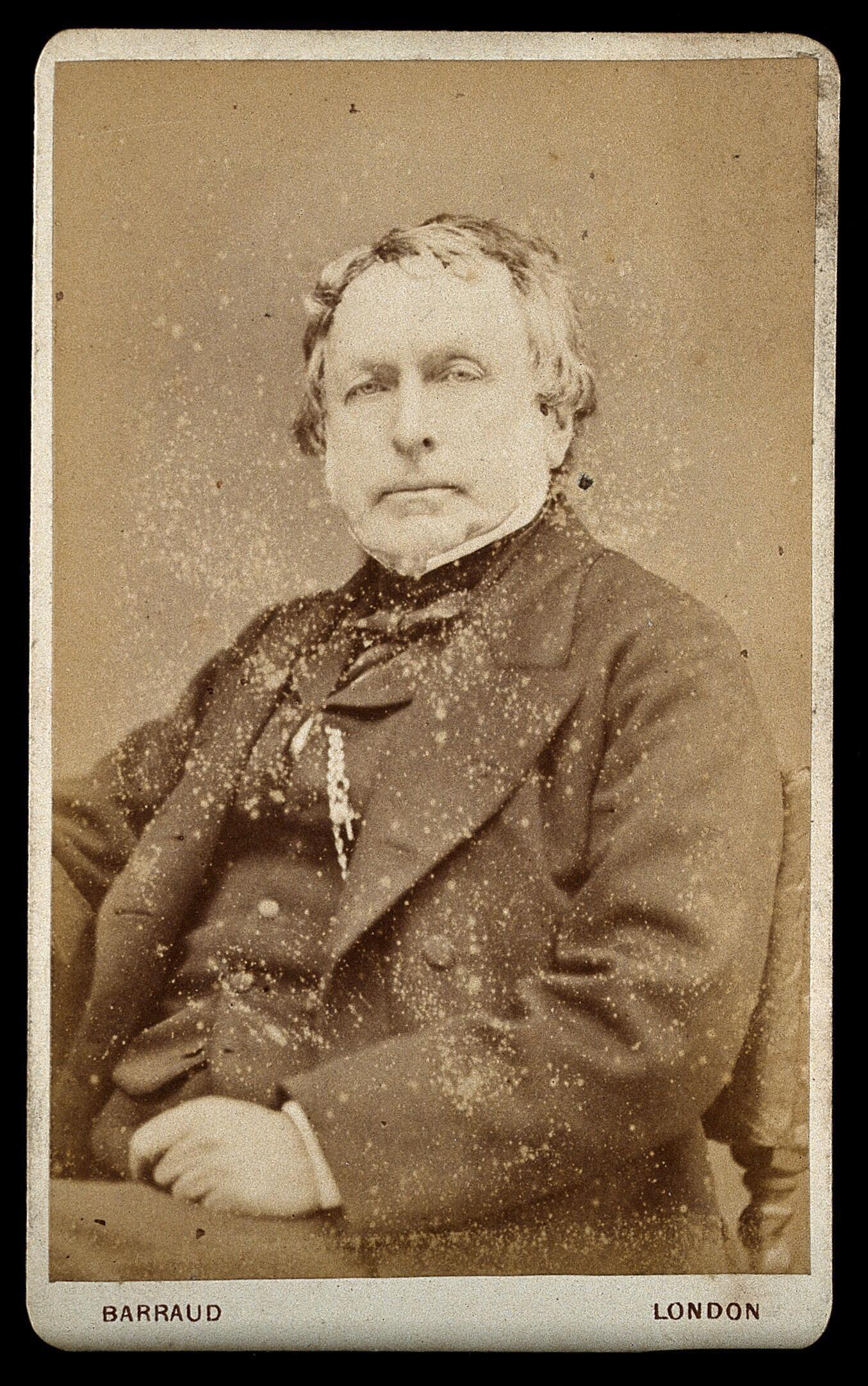
- Born: November 1796
- Died: 31 January, 1865 (aged 68–69)
- Education: Trinity College Dublin
- Scientific career
- Workplaces: University of London

Jones Quain (pronounced "kwan") (November 1796 – 31 January 1865) was an Irish anatomist, born at Mallow. Quain was Professor of Anatomy and Physiology in the University of London. He was author of Elements of Anatomy, of which the first edition was published in 1828.

== Biography ==
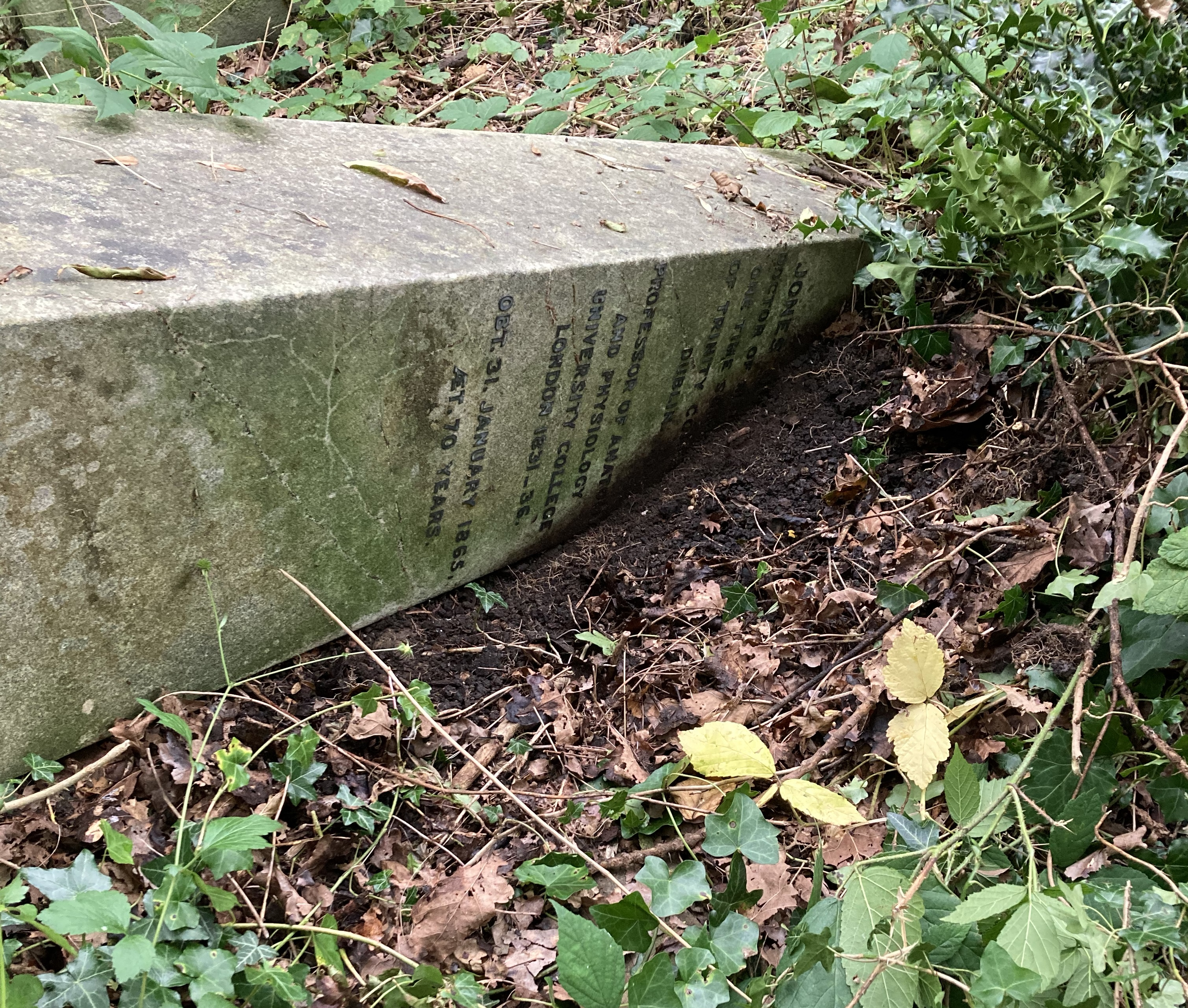
Grave of Jones Quain in Highgate Cemetery

Quain, born in November 1796, was eldest son of Richard Quain of Ratheahy, County Cork, by his first wife, a Miss Jones. His grandfather was David Quain of Carrigoon, County Cork. He received the name of Jones from his mother's family. Richard Quain (1800–1887) was his full brother, and Sir John Richard Quain his half-brother. Sir Richard Quain was his first cousin. He began his education in Adair's school at Fermoy. He then entered Trinity College Dublin, where he was elected a Scholar in 1814, then the highest classical distinction. He graduated in arts, and in 1820 he took the degree of bachelor of medicine, though he did not proceed M.D. until 1833. At the close of his college career he visited the continental schools and spent some time in Paris, translating and editing Martinet's Manual of Pathology.

Quain came to London in 1825 and joined, as one of its anatomical teachers, the Aldersgate Street school of medicine founded by Frederick Tyrrell. The other teacher of anatomy was William Lawrence. While engaged there he published Elements of Anatomy which became a standard text-book in English-speaking countries. An attack of hæmoptysis occurring while he suffered from a dissection wound compelled him to take a rest for two years.

Quain accepted in 1831 the office of Professor of General Anatomy at University College, then vacant by the resignation of Granville Sharp Pattison; Richard Quain, his brother, acted as senior demonstrator and lecturer on descriptive anatomy, while Erasmus Wilson was his prosector. He was also invited to lecture upon physiology. He resigned his post at University College in 1835, and in the same year he was appointed a member of the senate of the University of London. He lived in retirement during the last twenty years of his life, and chiefly in Paris, devoting himself to literary and scientific pursuits. Quain was an elegant and accomplished scholar, and he was deeply interested in literature as well as science.

He died, unmarried, on 31 January 1865, and was buried on the eastern side of Highgate Cemetery (plot no.13693). The obelisk above his grave has now fallen and the inscription is largely obscured.

== Works ==
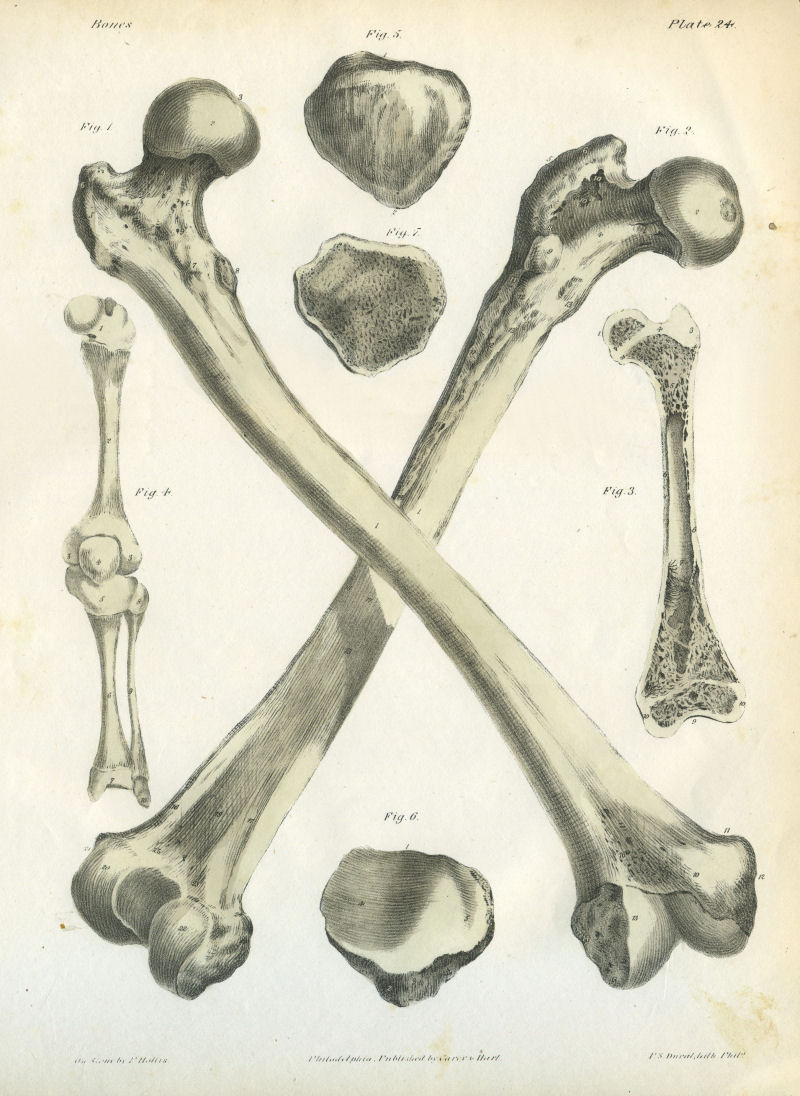
A Series of Anatomical Plates Bones Plate 24

His medical writings were:

1. Elements of Descriptive and Practical Anatomy for the use of Students, London, 1828; 2nd edit. London, 1832; 3rd edit. 1834; 4th edit. 1837; 5th edit. edited by R. Quain and W. Sharpey, 2 vols. 1848; 6th edit. edited by W. Sharpey and G. V. Ellis, 3 vols. 1856; 7th edit. edited by W. Sharpey, Allen Thomson, and John Cleland, 2 vols. 1864–7; translated into German, Erlangen, 1870–2; 8th edit. edited by W. Sharpey, Allen Thomson, and E. A. Schäfer, 2 vols. 1876; 9th edit. edited by Allen Thomson, E. A. Schäfer, and G. D. Thane, 2 vols. 1882; 10th edit. by E. A. Schäfer, and G. D. Thane, 3 vols. 1890, &c.
2. Martinet's Manual of Pathology translated, with notes and additions, by Jones Quain, London, 1826; 2nd edit. 1827; 3rd edit. 1829; 4th edit. 1835.
3. With Erasmus Wilson, A Series of Anatomical Plates in Lithography with References and Physiological Comments illustrating the Structure of the different Parts of the Human Body, 2 vols., London, 1836–42.
