= Frederick Tyrrell =

English surgeon

Frederick Tyrrell or Tyrell (1793–1843) was an English surgeon.

Tyrrell was assistant surgeon at the London Eye Infirmary in 1820, and Lecturer in anatomy and surgeon to St Thomas's Hospital in 1822. He became Arris & Gale lecturer. He published Diseases of the eye (1840).

A nephew (by marriage) of Sir Astley Cooper, Tyrrell was one of Thomas Wakley's 'Three Ninnyhammers' whom Wakley accused of medical incompetence. Tyrrell was also co-proprietor of the Aldersgate Private Medical Academy (founded 1825) with William Lawrence.
