= Harveian Society of London =

The Harveian Society of London
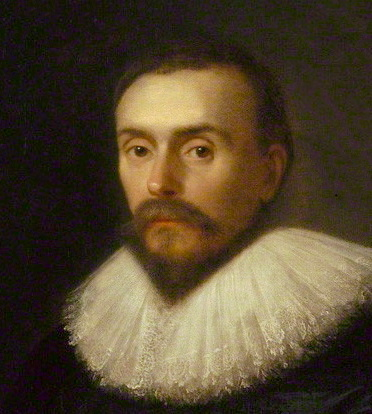
- William Harvey
- Founder: John Coakley Lettsom
- Type: Charity
- Location: The Medical Society of London, Chandos Street, Cavendish Square
- President: Robina Coker
- Website: The Harveian Society of London

The Harveian Society of London, named after the physician William Harvey, is a medical society and registered charity, founded in 1831. Doctors assemble regularly at the Medical Society of London, Chandos Street, Cavendish Square to converse and discuss medical matters through the medium of lectures and conferences.

The society's council rotates annually and comprises the president, two vice-presidents, the treasurer, the executive and two honorary secretaries, the archivist and nine councillors.

== Origins ==
Physician and philanthropist John Coakley Lettsom opened a dispensary in London in 1770, following which, in 1773, he founded the Medical Society of London. Over the next 50 years, the expansion of dispensaries, particularly around Marylebone, led to a group of doctors creating the West London Medical Society, with the intention of bettering their knowledge and advance medical science.

By October 1831, the society's name had changed to 'The Harveian Society of London' and it had held its first meeting at the Western General Dispensary. From 1951, the meetings have been held at the Medical Society of London's home, Lettsom House.

Anthony Todd Thompson and Marshall Hall, both physicians, were the first two presidents. Subsequently, presidents have frequently been high-profile medical professionals, including Thomas Hodgkin, D'Arcy Power, Lord Horder, Cecil Wakeley and Sir Zachary Cope.

Society rules were first printed in 1832. The society remained exclusively male until 1956, when women were permissible to join in only as guests, eventually being allowed full membership from 1964 under the presidency of Dr. D. Geraint James.

== Prizes ==
In 1928, following the death of his son, killed in the First World War, Sir George Buckston Browne endowed the Buckston Browne Prize and a medal for a paper based on original work, in memory of his son.

Established in 1954, the William Harvey Memorial prize was initially open only to students from the William Harvey Grammar School. In 2026 Ollie Osborn was the recipient of this award.

== Annual events ==
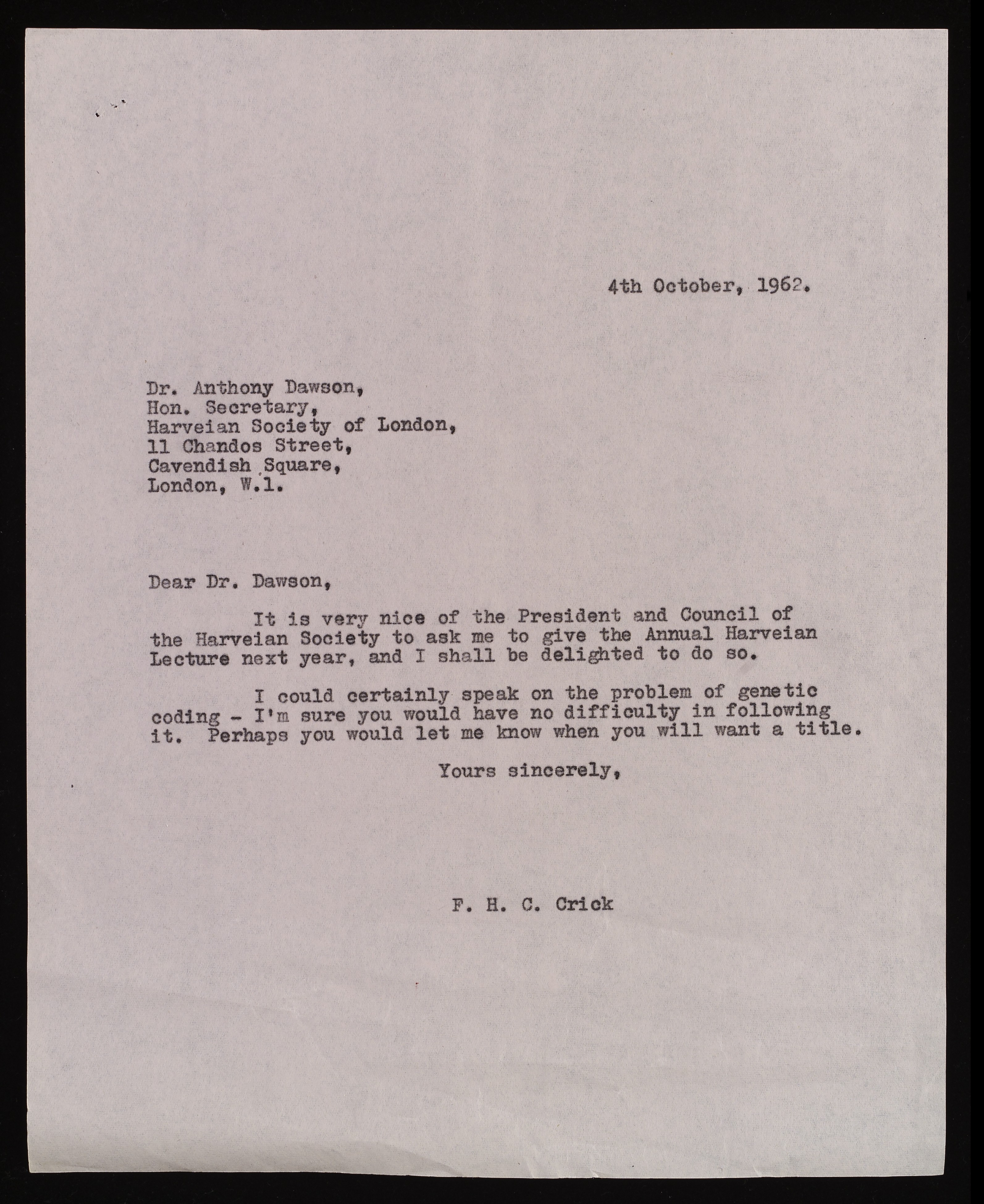
Letter from Francis Crick to Dr Anthony Dawson Wellcome L0038049

Started in 1875, an annual lecture is given in honour of William Harvey. Past speakers have included surgeon (and brother of economist John Maynard Keynes) Geoffrey Keynes, Nobel Prize winners for work on penicillin Ernest Chain and Howard Florey, co-discoverer of DNA Francis Crick and heart transplant pioneer Christiaan Barnard.

Every year, in June, the members hold a meeting in Harvey's birthplace in Folkestone and lay a wreath at Harvey's statue. In 1973, in the presence of the society and on behalf of the British Medical Association, an honorary plaque was added.

Buckston Browne endowed an annual dinner for Harveian members, which is also celebrated with the Buckston Browne cup. In 1944, Lt–Colonel Sir Norman Gray Hill was killed in the Second World War. In honour of his endowment and memory, the annual dinner was renamed the Buckston Browne Gray Hill Dinner.

== Harveian Library ==
A selection of Harvey's works, biographies and portraits are kept in a small library. Some portraits were removed from the Royal College of Physicians and returned to the society.

== Anniversaries ==
In 1975, the society commissioned sculptor Nigel Boonham to create a head of William Harvey for his 400th anniversary. A total of fifty were to be cast in a resin bronze limited edition and sold to members.

== Other notable medical associations named after William Harvey ==
The Royal College of Physicians of London holds an annual lecture established by William Harvey in 1656 called the Harveian Oration.

The Harveian Society of Edinburgh was founded in 1782 by Dr Andrew Duncan. The society holds an annual festival in honour of Harvey. The president of the society delivers the Harveian Oration, followed by a formal dinner. The festival is held in the Royal College of Physicians of Edinburgh.

The Harvey Society, found in 1905, is based in New York City and hosts an annual lecture series on recent advances in biomedical sciences.

The Harvey Club of London, the oldest medical club in Canada, is based in the University of Western Ontario
