= Charles Kite (surgeon) =

English surgeon and medical writer

- Died: 1811; Gravesend
- Occupations: Surgeon and medical writer

Charles Kite (died 1811) was an English surgeon and medical writer.

== Biography ==
Kite was a member of the corporation of surgeons in London, and practised at Gravesend, where he died in 1811. Besides contributing to the ‘Memoirs’ of the London Medical Society and other medical journals, he wrote:

- ‘An Essay on the Recovery of the Apparently Dead,’ 8vo, London, 1788, to which the silver medal of the Humane Society was adjudged.
- ‘Essays and Observations, Physiological and Medical, on the Submersion of Animals, and on the Resin of the Acoroides Resinifera, or Yellow Resin of Botany Bay. … Select Histories of Diseases. … (Meteorological Tables,’ &c.), 8vo, London, 1795.
