= Diamond Cay =

Island in the British Virgin Islands

- Location within British Virgin Islands Location within the Caribbean

Geography
- Location: Caribbean Sea
- Coordinates: 18°26′55″N 64°43′28″W
- Archipelago: Virgin Islands

Administration
- United Kingdom
- British Overseas Territory: British Virgin Islands

Additional information
- Time zone: AST (UTC-4)
- ISO code: VG

Diamond Cay is a tiny islet located just off Jost Van Dyke in the British Virgin Islands in the Caribbean. At low tide, it is connected by a sandbar to Jost Van Dyke. It was declared a national park in 1991. The Diamond Cay National Park provides habitat for pelicans, terns and boobies to nest.
