= Jost Van Dyke =

Smallest of the four main islands of the British Virgin Islands

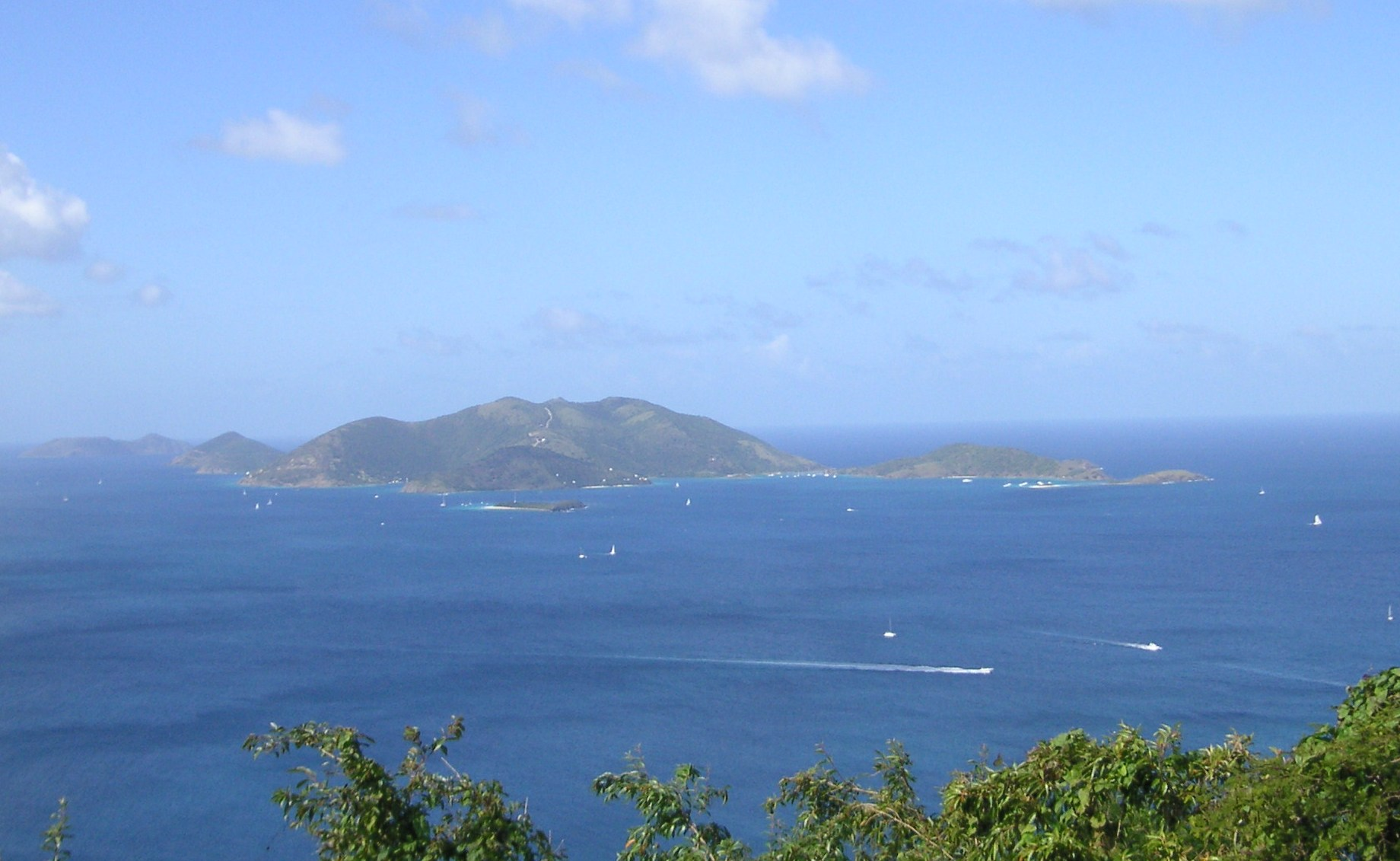
- Jost Van Dyke

- The location of Jost Van Dyke within the British Virgin Islands

- Location within British Virgin Islands Location within the Caribbean

Geography
- Location: Caribbean Sea
- Coordinates: 18°27′N 64°45′W
- Archipelago: Virgin Islands
- Area: 8 km^{2} (3.1 sq mi)
- Highest point: Majohnny Hill at 321 meters (1054 ft)

Administration
- United Kingdom; British Virgin Islands
- British Overseas Territory: British Virgin Islands

Demographics
- Population: 298 (2010)

Additional information
- Time zone: AST (UTC-4)
- ISO code: VG

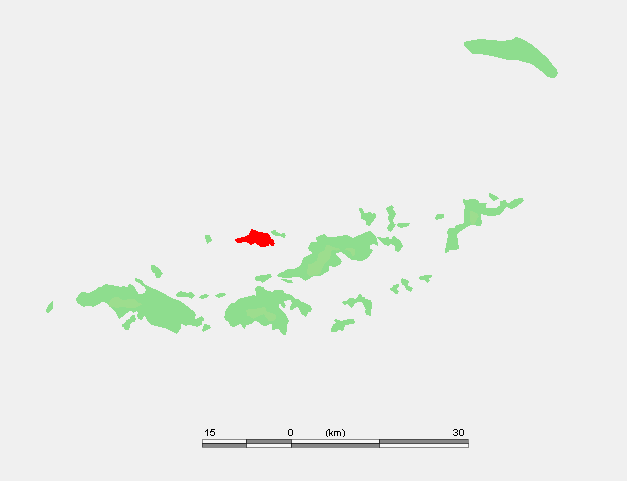
The location of Jost Van Dyke in the Virgin Island chain

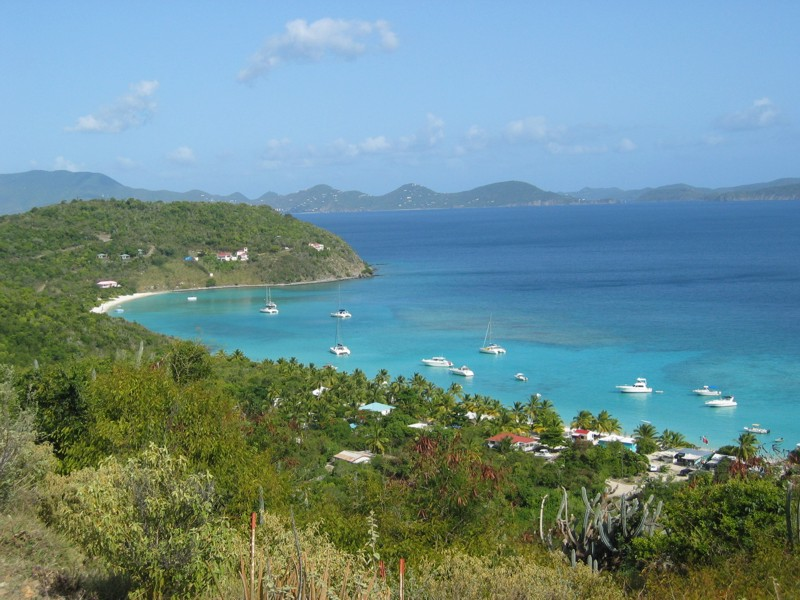
View overlooking White Bay, Jost Van Dyke, BVI

Jost Van Dyke (/ˈjoʊst væn ˈdaɪk/; sometimes colloquially referred to as JVD or Jost) is the smallest of the four main islands of the British Virgin Islands (BVI), measuring roughly 8 square kilometres (3 square miles). It rests in the northern portion of the archipelago of the Virgin Islands, located in the Atlantic Ocean and Caribbean Sea. Jost Van Dyke lies about 8 km (5 mi) to the northwest of Tortola and 8 km (5 mi) to the north of Saint John, U.S. Virgin Islands. Little Jost Van Dyke lies off its eastern end.

Like many of the neighbouring islands, it is volcanic in origin and mountainous. The highest point on the island is Majohnny Hill at 321 m (1,053 ft).

== History ==
17th-century Dutch privateer, Joost van Dyk, an early Dutch settler and former pirate who used Jost van Dyke's harbours as a hideout, may be the namesake of the island. However, factual evidence for this is not available.

John C. Lettsome (of Little Jost Van Dyke), founder of the Medical Society of London was one of Jost Van Dyke's noteworthy residents.

Although the English captured the BVI in 1672, it seems that Jost Van Dyke was mostly ignored until the mid-18th century. A map drawn of the BVI in 1717 by Captain John Walton does not depict either Jost Van Dyke or Little Jost Van Dyke.

The remains of sugar works on the ridge above Great Harbour provide archaeological evidence that some sugar cane was under cultivation and processed, though probably not in any great quantity.

In 1815, 140 acres (0.57 km^{2}) were under cotton cultivation, producing 21,000 pounds (9525 kg) annually. There was a population of 428 (25 whites, 32 free persons of colour and 371 slaves). By 1825, cotton production decreased to 17,000 pounds (7711 kg), while the population increased to 506 (34 whites, 76 free persons of colour and 397 slaves).

Similar to other islands in the region, JVD and the BVI saw gradual and irreversible economic decline throughout the 18th century. Curiously though, the population of Jost Van Dyke continued to increase (probably due to the freedom of travel enjoyed by the former slave population after Emancipation in the BVI in 1838). Thereafter, many BVI islanders regularly sought work at the Royal Mail Steam Packet Company's coaling wharves in St. Thomas, (today- United States Virgin Islands). By 1853, Dookhan (1975) attributes a population of 1,235 residents on Jost Van Dyke, 196 of whom died of a cholera outbreak in that same year.

From the Emancipation Era forward, the community of Jost Van Dyke subsisted mainly on small scale fishing and subsistence agriculture. Charcoal-making was a practice that began during the plantation era when strong fires were vital for sugar and rum production, and charcoal making emerged as a primary industry for the BVI during the Post-Emancipation years. Between the 1920s and 1960s, an estimated 20,000 tons of charcoal were exported from the BVI to the US Virgin Islands. (1998. Penn-Moll, Verna, Coals of Fire: The Development of the Caribbean Fireplace Technology with Traditional Customs, Myths and Sayings.)

According to island residents, on JVD, people would work collectively to build charcoal pits, a practice that occasionally continues to this day. The pits were often a social gathering place; women might use the heat of the fire to bake bread or roast breadfruit while the men might play dominoes around the pit.

Maritime resources were also extremely important historically to the people of Jost Van Dyke, and the island has emerged as a fishing village. The desire for trade and social interaction with nearby islands stimulated the development of seafaring skills. Sailing, fishing, rowing and boat construction flourished. Small, locally constructed sailing vessels the "Tortola Boat" flourished in the BVI until about the 1960s when they were replaced with motorized craft.

=== Hurricane Irma ===
Jost Van Dyke, like the rest of the British Virgin Islands, suffered catastrophic damage from Hurricane Irma, a Category 5 storm which struck the territory in September 2017. The island's hillsides were stripped of vegetation. Jost Van Dyke's primary school, health clinic, and two petrol stations were damaged, while most of the island's homes were destroyed.

With little aid from the British or territorial governments during the week following the storm, Jost Van Dyke's 298 residents set up a recovery and command center at Foxy’s Tamarind Bar and Restaurant. Food from other restaurants and residences were brought to Foxy's, which housed the island's only major, surviving refrigerator and generators before others were repaired by the Royal Marines later that month. Residents used a salvaged chainsaw to clear roads and connect remote parts of the islands.

== Demographics and tourism ==
As at the 2010 Census, the population of Jost Van Dyke was 298. The population has grown strongly in recent decades, in line with the population of the Virgin Islands. Its recorded population in 1991 was 140. The island has a young population with nearly one-half (46%) of residents under the age of 35 and almost 70% under the age of 50.

Jost Van Dyke receives numerous visitors. The island is accessible by private boats and ferry service from Tortola, Saint Thomas, and Saint John.

The most frequent destination is Great Harbour (or Belle Vue). The beach strip around the harbour is lined with small bars and restaurants.

Great Harbour is one of the busiest ports in the BVI: in 2008, nearly 7,000 boats cleared through the island's port. Today, tourism, and particularly yachting tourism is the mainstay of the economy.

White Bay is lined with beach bars and is a very popular stop for yachts and boaters from Tortola, St. Thomas and St. John. Group tours from the USVI and even small cruise ships are also frequent visitors.

A dock is available for day boaters. Nearby, a natural rock formation called the Bubbly Pool is a popular attraction. It gets its name from the bubbles that form in the water when waves crash against the rocks.

The country music video for Kenny Chesney's 2002 recording "No Shoes, No Shirt, No Problems" was filmed on and around Jost Van Dyke. Chesney also references Jost Van Dyke in his songs "Somewhere in The Sun" from his album Be as You Are (Songs from an Old Blue Chair) and "It's That Time of Day" from his album "Life on a Rock".

In 1993, Supermodel Kate Moss filmed her infamous “Obsession” campaign for Calvin Klein on the island, photographed by her then boyfriend, Mario Sorrenti.

== Education ==
The British Virgin Islands operates several government schools.

Jost Van Dyke residents are served by Jost Van Dyke Primary School which offers both primary and secondary education. As of 2011, after students graduate from primary school they attend secondary (high school) for two years on Jost Van Dyke. After completing two years of high school on Jost Van Dyke, students travel daily from Monday to Friday to the main island of Tortola to attend the Elmore Stoutt High School. Students must catch the 7:00 am ferry and return to Jost Van Dyke on the 4:00 pm ferry.

== Notable people ==
- Ella Gifft - suffragist and entrepreneur.
- William Thornton - architect and the designer of US Capitol
- John C. Lettsome - founder of the Medical Society of London
