= Raymond Kirk =

Raymond Kirk may refer to:

- Raymond M. Kirk (1923–2019), British surgeon
- Raymond V. Kirk (1901–1947), American Catholic priest and president of Duquesne University
