= James Sims (physician) =

Anglo-Irish physician

James Sims (1741–1820) was an Anglo-Irish physician.

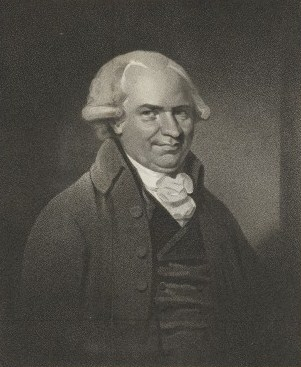
James Sims, 1801 engraving by Nathan Branwhite after Samuel Medley.

== Life ==
The son of a nonconformist minister, he was born in County Down in Ireland. He was sent to Leyden University, where he proceeded M.D. in 1764.

Sims returned to Ireland, after practicing for a time in County Tyrone, he moved to London, where he was admitted a licentiate of the Royal College of Physicians on 30 September 1778. He was helped by John Coakley Lettsom, and soon acquired a practice.

Sims was the first chairman and vice-president of the Philanthropic Society; and was also involved in the Humane Society in its early days. He served for 22 years as president of the Medical Society of London, and was displaced only by strenuous exertions by younger fellows. He had a collection of books which he made over to the society in 1802, in return for an annuity.

Sims retired to Bath, Somerset in 1810. He died there in 1820.

== Works ==
Sims's his inaugural thesis at Leyden was De Temperie Fœminea et Morbis inde oriundis. Other works are:

- Observations on Epidemic Disorders, with Remarks on Nervous and Malignant Fevers, London, 1773; 2nd edit. 1776; translated into German (Hamburg, 1775), and into French (Avignon, 1778).
- A Discourse on the best methods of prosecuting Medical Enquiries, London, 1774; 2nd edit. 1774; translated into French (Avignon, 1778), and into Italian (Venice, 1786).
- Observations on the Scarlatina Anginosa, commonly called the Ulcerated Sore Throat, London; 3rd edit. 1803; an American edition was published at Boston in 1796.

Sims also completed and corrected Edward Foster's Principles and Practice of Midwifery, 2 vols., London, 1781.
