= Edmund Owen =

English surgeon

- Born: 7 April 1847; Finchingfield, Essex
- Died: 23 July 1915 (aged 68); Charing Cross Hospital, London
- Occupation: Physician

Edmund Blackett Owen, FRCS (7 April 1847 – 23 July 1915) was an English surgeon.

== Biography ==
He was the third son of a practicing doctor of Finchingfield, Essex and educated in nearby Bishops Stortford.

After studying medicine at St Mary's Hospital, London, Owen was appointed Resident Medical Officer and Demonstrator of Anatomy at St Mary's in 1868 and Lecturer of Anatomy in 1876. He was made M.R.C.S. in 1868 and F.R.C.S. in 1876. He also studied medicine in Paris and was made Chevalier de la Légion d'honneur. For many years he was a surgeon at both St Mary's Hospital and the Hospital for Sick Children, Great Ormond Street.

He was elected President of the Harveian Society in 1887 and President of the Medical Society of London in 1898.

== Honours ==
- 1887 – President of the Harveian Society
- 1898 – President of the Medical Society of London
- 7 March 1900 – Knight of Grace of the Order of St John of Jerusulem
- 1903 – Cross of the Legion of Honor
- 1906 – Bradshaw Lecture to Royal College of Surgeons
- 1911 – Hunterian Oration to Royal College of Surgeons

== Family ==
Owen was married in 1882 and his wife died in 1906. Upon his own death in 1915 he was survived by four daughters.

== Books ==
- The surgical diseases of children. 1885.
- A manual of surgery for senior students. 1890.
- Cleft-palate and hare-lip. 1904.
- Appendicitis: a plea for immediate operation. 1914.
