= Fothergillian Medal =

Highlights
- First recipient: William Falconer

The Fothergillian Medal is awarded by the Medical Society of London since 1787.

The first recipient was William Falconer. It was awarded to Edward Jenner in 1803.
