= Charles Ernest Lakin =

English physician, surgeon, pathologist and anatomist

- Born: 23 February 1878; Leicester, Leicestershire
- Died: 2 May 1972 (aged 94); Bury St Edmunds, Suffolk
- Occupations: Physician, pathologist, and dermatologist
- Known for: Presidency of the Medical Society of London (1938)

Charles Ernest Lakin FRCS FRCP (1878–1972) was an English physician, surgeon, pathologist, and anatomist.

== Biography ==
After education at Carter’s School and the Wyggeston Grammar School for Boys, Leicester, Charles Ernest Lakin entered in 1896 the Middlesex Hospital Medical School. He qualified in 1901 MRCS, LRCP. He graduated in 1902 MB BS (Lond.) and in 1903 MD. For some years Lakin was a demonstrator of anatomy and a clinical assistant in the skin department at the Middlesex Hospital and also a clinical assistant at the Hospital for Sick Children, Great Ormond Street. He was also curator of the Middlesex Hospital's pathological museum and wrote its history in 1908. In 1908 he qualified MRCP. From 1904 to 1912 he performed all the autopsies at the Middlesex Hospital. There in 1912 he was appointed assistant physician and lecturer in morbid anatomy. He later also joined the London Fever Hospital's staff and became advisory physician to London's Royal National Throat, Nose and Ear Hospital. During WWI he served in the RAMC as pathologist at the Addington Park War Hospital, although he continued his civilian appointment as consultant physician at the Middlesex Hospital. During WWII Lakin moved to Mount Vernon Hospital, Northwood, London, and continued there at least until 1950.

Lakin ... habitually wore a black swallow-tail coat, a wing collar, boots and pince-nez. ... After retirement in the early 1950s he moved to West Stow Hall near Bury St. Edmunds, an historic house bought by the Croftes family in 1485 from the Abbey of Bury St Edmunds. ... Lakin remained a bachelor ...

He collected antique furniture with zeal, and at his home in West Stow Hall he had a wonderful copy of Gainsborough's Blue Boy, an original portrait of James II as a young man, beautiful furniture, and Elizabeth writings on the walls.

== Awards and honours ==
- 1905 — elected FRCS
- 1916 — elected FRCP
- 1932 — Lumleian Lecturer on The Borderlands of Medicine
- 1934 — Lettsomian Lecturer on Disturbances of the Body Temperature
- 1938 — President of the Medical Society of London with Presidential Address on Lettsom's England
- 1943 — Annual Orator to the Medical Society of London with Annual Oration on Outside the Textbooks
- 1947 — Harveian Orator on Our Founders and Benefactors

== Selected publications ==
- Taylor, G.; Lakin, C. E. (1910). "Perforative Peritonitis Originating in Pouches of the Large Intestine". The Lancet. 175 (4512): 495–496. doi:10.1016/s0140-6736(01)74775-7.
- Taylor, G.; Lakin, C. E. (1911). "A Fatal Case of Phlegmonous Inflammation of the Duodenum following Impaction of a Fish Bone". The Lancet. 178 (4586): 224–225. doi:10.1016/s0140-6736(01)42056-3.
- Hort, E. C.; Lakin, C. E.; Benians, T. H. (1915). "EPIDEMIC CEREBRO-SPINAL FEVER: THE PLACE OF THE MENINGOCOCCUS IN ITS ETIOLOGY: A Bacteriological Study. (Preliminary Note.)". British Medical Journal. 1 (2830): 541–543. doi:10.1136/bmj.1.2830.541. PMC 2302044. PMID 20767550.
- Hort, E. C.; Lakin, C. E.; Benians, T. H. (1915). "EPIDEMIC CEREBRO-SPINAL FEVER: THE PLACE OF THE MENINGOCOCCUS IN ITS ETIOLOGY: A Bacteriological Study. (Interim Report.)". British Medical Journal. 1 (2834): 715–718. doi:10.1136/bmj.1.2834.715. PMC 2302188. PMID 20767606.
- Hort, E. C.; Lakin, C. E.; Benians, T. H. C. (1916). "The Relationship of the Meningococcus of Weichselbaum to the True Infective Agent in Epidemic Cerebrospinal Fever". Journal of the Royal Army Medical Corps. 26 (2): 153–188.
- Lakin, C. E. (1917). "Case of Supposed Intrathoracic Neoplasm". Proceedings of the Royal Society of Medicine. 10 (Sect Study Dis Child): 7–9. doi:10.1177/003591571701001804. PMC 2018079. PMID 19979911.
- Lakin, C. E. (1917). "Discussion on the Ætiology and Treatment of Iritis". Proceedings of the Royal Society of Medicine. 10 (Sect Ophthalmol): 54–56. doi:10.1177/003591571701001619. PMC 2017371. PMID 19979871.
- Lakin, C. E. (1917). "Case of Supposed Intrathoracic Neoplasm". Proceedings of the Royal Society of Medicine. 10 (Sect Study Dis Child): 7–9. doi:10.1177/003591571701001804. PMC 2018079. PMID 19979911.
- Lakin, C. E. (1926). "Anæsthesia in Relation to Disturbances of the Circulation". Proceedings of the Royal Society of Medicine. 19 (Sect Anaesth): 27–31. doi:10.1177/003591572601901413. PMC 1948524. PMID 19985153.
- Lakin, C. E. (1928). "Case of Diabetes with Sciatic Neuritis and Muscular Atrophy". Proceedings of the Royal Society of Medicine. 21 (3): 446. doi:10.1177/003591572802100353. PMC 2102005. PMID 19986265.
- Lakin, C. E. (1928). "Occlusion of the Left Subclavian Artery". Proceedings of the Royal Society of Medicine. 21 (7): 1167–1168. doi:10.1177/003591572802100715. PMC 2102329. PMID 19986490.
- Lakin, C. E. (1935). "Septicaemia". British Medical Journal. 1 (3875): 777–779. doi:10.1136/bmj.1.3875.777. PMC 2460265. PMID 20779006.
- Lakin, C. E. (1938). "Toxic and Infective Jaundice". British Medical Journal. 2 (4051): 437–439. doi:10.1136/bmj.2.4051.437. PMC 2210491. PMID 20781691.
- Lakin, C. E. (1948). "Our Founders and Benefactors". British Medical Journal. 1 (4543): 185–188. doi:10.1136/bmj.1.4543.185. PMC 2089746. PMID 18899046.
- Lakin, C. E. (1949). "William Cayley, M.D., F.R.C.P". Postgraduate Medical Journal. 25 (287): 404–407. doi:10.1136/pgmj.25.287.404. PMC 2529999. PMID 21313503.
