= D'Arcy Power =

British surgeon and medical historian

Sir Sir D'Arcy Power KBE FRCS FSA
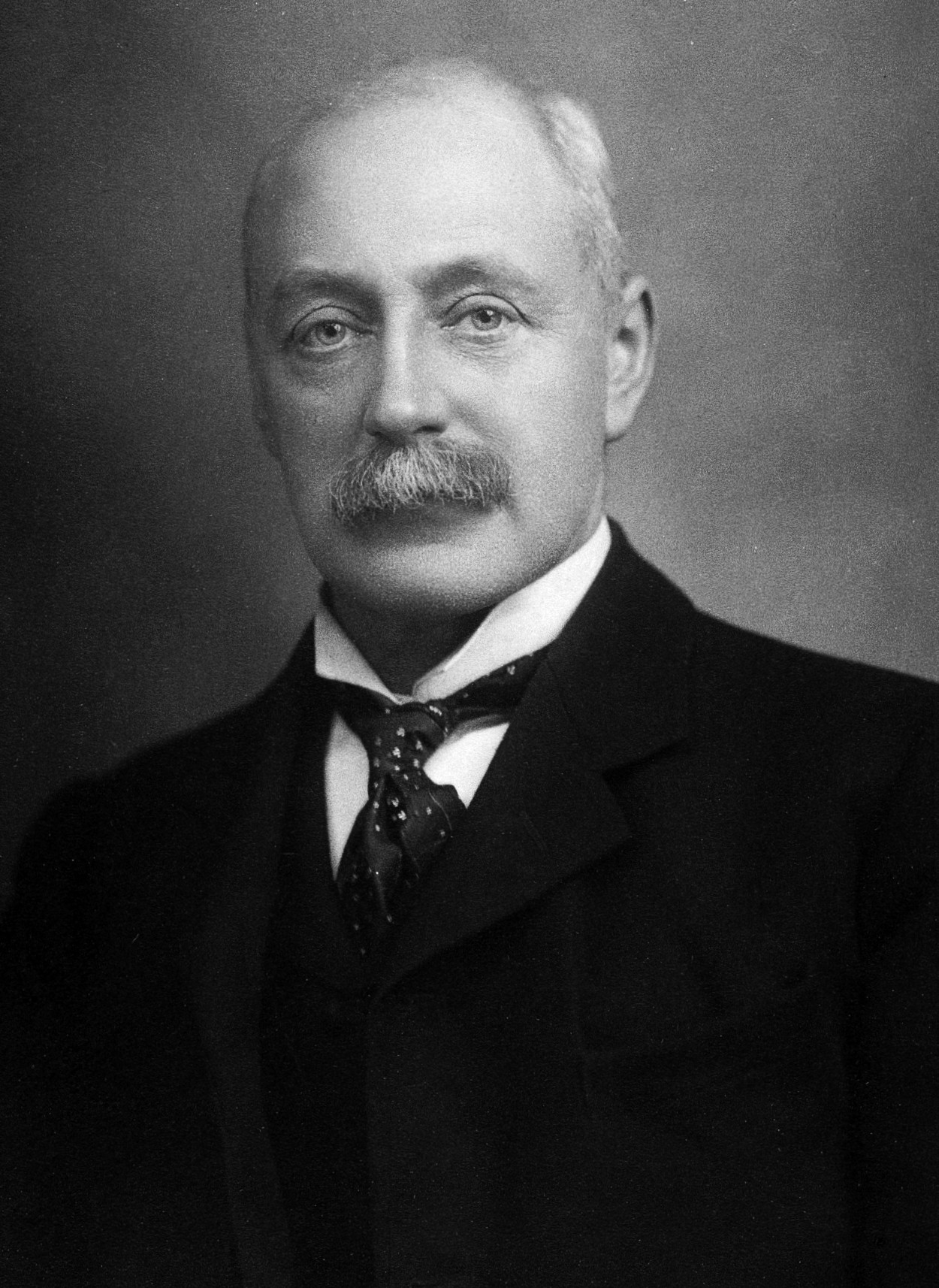
- Born: 11 November 1855; Pimlico, London
- Died: 18 May 1941 (aged 85)
- Occupation: Surgeon. medical historian
- Known for: Contributions to the Dictionary of National Biography President of the Medical Society of London President of the Harveian Society of London President of History of Medicine Society at the Royal Society of Medicine

Signature
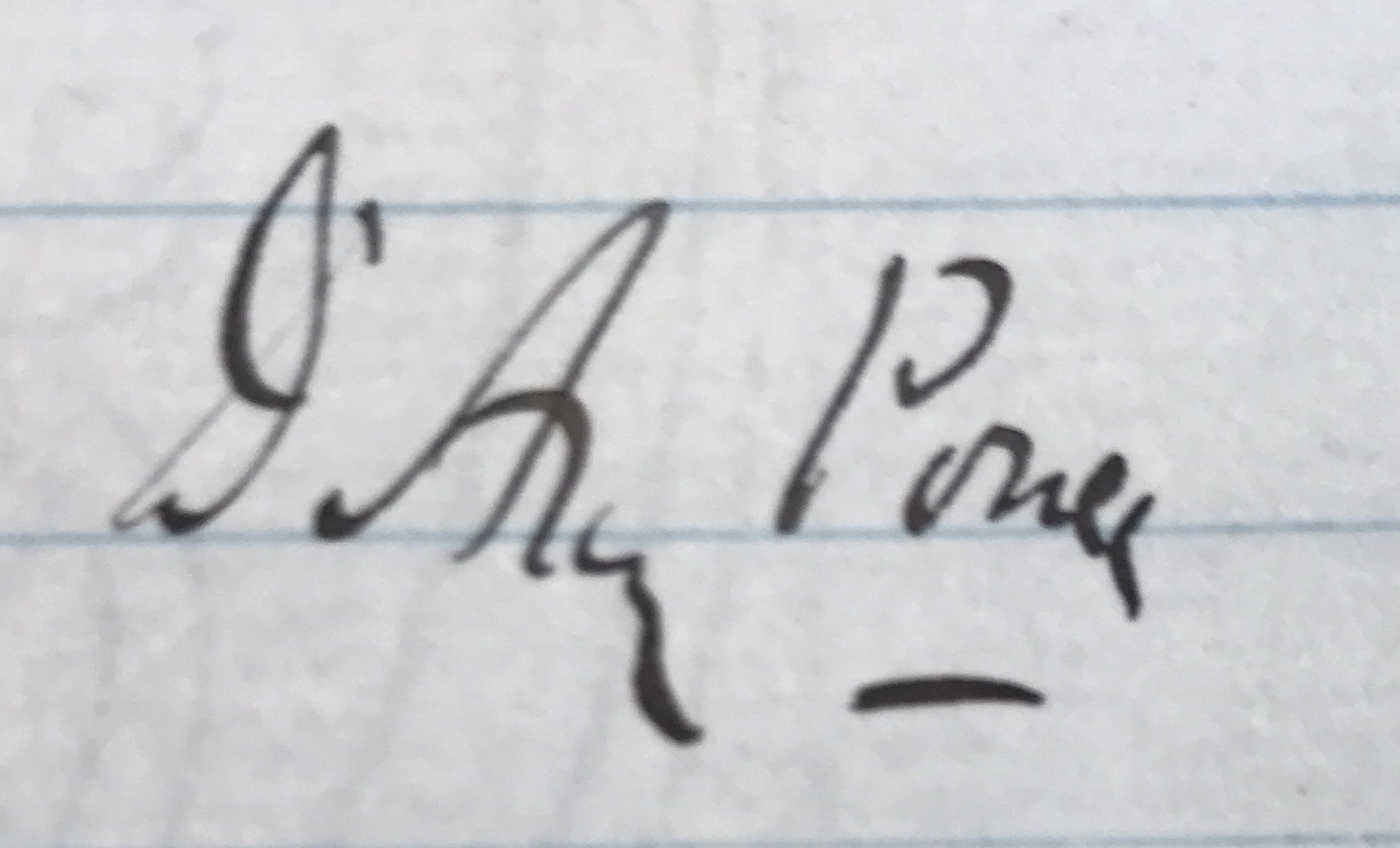

Sir D'Arcy Power, KBE FRCS FSA (11 November 1855 in Pimlico, London - 18 May 1941) was a British surgeon, medical historian, and contributor of some 200 articles on famous surgeons and other related figures to the Dictionary of National Biography.

== Medical career ==
D'Arcy Power was born on 11 November 1855 at 3 Grosvenor Terrace, Pimlico, in London, to Henry Power, himself a surgeon. Power was the eldest son of six boys and five girls. He was educated at Merchant Taylors' School, Northwood and entered New College, Oxford, before transferring to Exeter College. Though he wanted to be a physiologist, he ended up following his father into becoming a surgeon (at St. Bartholomew's Hospital). In this vein, he became a Fellow of the Royal College of Surgeons in 1883, serving as a member of its council from 1912 to 1928, and being its vice-president for the years 1921 and 1922. He gave the Bradshaw Lecture for 1918, the Vicary lecture for 1920, and delivered the Hunterian oration in 1925. He was variously also the Mitchell Banks Memorial Lecturer in 1933; a member of the executive committee of the Imperial Cancer Research Fund; President of the Medical Society of London; President of the Harveian Society of London and President of the History of Medicine Society (previously section) at the Royal Society of Medicine, 1926 to 1928. Power also both taught and examined in medicine and wrote textbooks and articles for a number of medical journals.

=== Army service ===
Commissioned as a surgeon in the Volunteer Medical Staff Corps on 25 April 1888, Power was given the rank of major in the Royal Army Medical Corps when its Territorial Force section was created on 31 July 1908, and was attached to 1st London General Hospital. He was mobilised with the outbreak of the First World War in August 1914, and promoted lieutenant-colonel on 22 August. Until 1916 he was based at the officers' hospital at Fishmongers' Hall, and then rejoined the main body of 1st London General Hospital, serving until demobilisation in 1920, Power was appointed Knight Commander of the Order of the British Empire in recognition of his service in military hospitals during the First World War in the 1919 King's Birthday Honours. He retired from the army on 30 September 1921.

== Personal life ==
Power married Eleanor Fosbroke, daughter of the surgeon George Haynes Fosbroke, in 1883; she predeceased him in 1923. They had two sons and a daughter. The older son, also called D'Arcy Power, followed his father into part-time service in the RAMC in 1911, and during the First World War became a captain and won the Military Cross. He transferred to the Medical Branch of the Royal Air Force on the formation of the new service on 1 April 1918—taking a permanent commission as a flight lieutenant in 1920—and ultimately reaching the rank of acting air vice marshal by 1945 when he was appointed Commander of the Order of the British Empire. The younger son, George Henry Fosbroke Power, died at the Second Battle of Ypres in 1915 when he was serving as a lieutenant in 6th Battalion, Middlesex Regiment. Power's daughter died young of whooping cough. Power, who was presented on his 75th birthday with a bibliography listing 609 of his "selected writings" by a special committee of the Osler Club, was also a Fellow of the Society of Antiquaries of London (where he was, for some time, a member of the council) and President of the Bibliographical Society from 1926 to 1928. He was a member of the London Survey Committee, a voluntary organisation publishing architectural surveys of the capital. He was also in 1903 a founding member of the Samuel Pepys Club. After his home was damaged in an air raid in 1940, Power moved in with his son at 53 Murray Road, Northwood, Middlesex, where he died on 18 May 1941.

== Notable works ==
Power's more notable standalone works included:

- William Harvey (1897) on the life of William Harvey;
- Portraits of Dr William Harvey (1913);
- Foundations of Medical History (1931);
- A Short History of Surgery (1933);
- Mirror for Surgeons, an anthology (1939).
