= Francis Avery Jones =

British doctor (1910–1998)

Sir Francis Avery Jones CBE FRCP MRCS (31 May 1910 – 30 April 1998) was a Welsh physician and gastroenterologist.

He was born in Briton Ferry, Carmarthenshire, Wales but educated at the Sir John Leman High School, Beccles, Suffolk and at St Bartholomew's Hospital Medical School, where he qualified in medicine in 1934.

As a house physician he became interested in gastroenterology and based his successful future clinical career on the treatment of stomach and bowel ulceration. In 1940, he was appointed as Physician to the staff of the Central Middlesex Hospital, where he joined a group of specialist gastroenterologists, remaining in the post until 1974. He also acted as consultant to St Mark's Hospital (1948–78) and the Royal Navy (1950–78). He was editor of the journal Gut from 1965 to 1970.

Made a fellow of the Royal College of Physicians he delivered a Goulstonian Lecture in 1947, a Lumleian lecture in 1956, a Croonian Lecture in 1969 and the Harveian Oration in 1980. He was awarded CBE in 1966 and knighted in 1970. He served as president of the Medical Society of London in 1977-78.

He died in Chichester, West Sussex on 30 April 1998. He had married twice, firstly in 1934 Dorothea Pfirter (died 1983) with whom he had one son and secondly in 1983 Joan Edmunds.
