= Nathaniel Hulme =

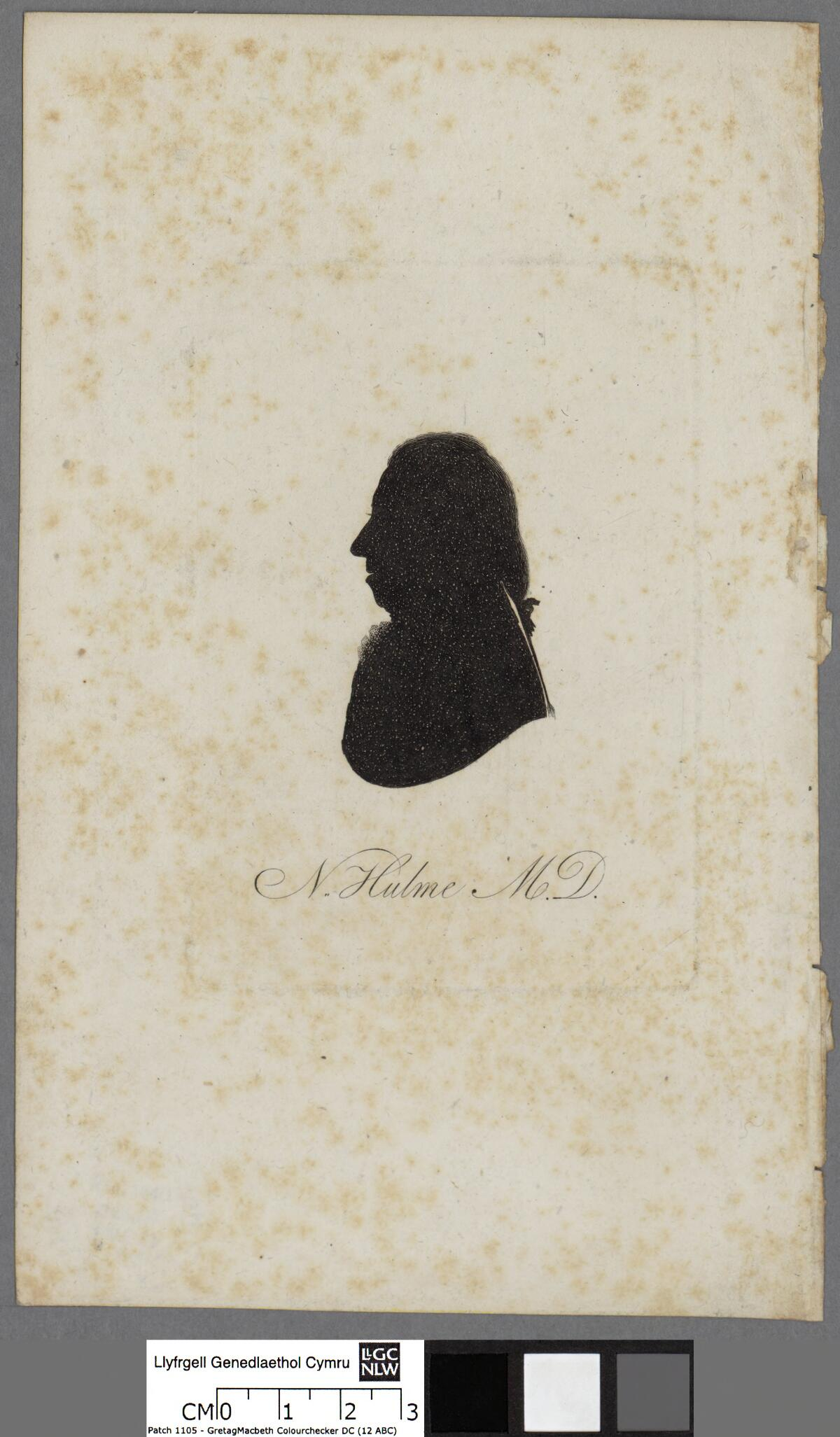
A portrait from the Welsh Portrait Collection at the National Library of Wales. Depicted person

Nathaniel Hulme, FRS (17 December 1732 – 28 March 1807) was a British physician.

He was born in Hulme Thorpe, near Halifax, Yorkshire and served an apprenticeship with his brother, a medical practitioner in the district. He then joined Guy's Hospital before joining the Royal Navy in 1755 as surgeon's mate. During a peacetime posting to Leith he attended medical classes at Edinburgh, graduating M.D. there in 1765.

He moved to London, and when the General Dispensary for the Relief of the Poor was first opened, became its first physician. In 1768 he was appointed physician to the City of London Lying-in Hospital, a post he held until 1793, and wrote Treatise on the Puerperal Fever based on his experience there. On 17 March 1774 he was appointed physician to the London Charterhouse hospital and moved to live in Charterhouse Square, where he lived until his death.

He was elected President of the London Medical Society in 1776 and elected a Fellow of the Royal Society in 1794. He was also a Fellow of the Society of Antiquaries.

He died on 28 March 1807 from the effects of falling from the roof of his house when checking the chimneys and was buried in the pensioners' burial-ground of the Charterhouse.
