= D'Arcy Power (RAF officer) =

CBE MC D'Arcy Power
- Born: 2 June 1889; East Frisia
- Died: 26 December 1958 (aged 69)
- Allegiance: United Kingdom
- Branch: Royal Air Force
- Rank: Air vice-marshal
- Conflicts: First World War

Air Vice-Marshal D'Arcy Power CBE MC (2 June 1889 – 26 December 1958) was a British surgeon and Royal Air Force officer. He was the son of Sir D'Arcy Power, also a surgeon.

== Army service ==
Power followed his father into part-time service in the RAMC in 1911, and during the First World War became a captain and won the Military Cross.

== Royal Air Force service ==
He transferred to the Medical Branch of the Royal Air Force on the formation of the new service on 1 April 1918—taking a permanent commission as a flight lieutenant in 1920—and ultimately reaching the rank of acting air vice marshal by 1945 when he was appointed Commander of the Order of the British Empire.

== Personal life ==
Power was a Freemason, and served as Master of the Lodge of Assistance No 2773 (London) from 1949 to 1950.
