= Samuel Foart Simmons =

British physician

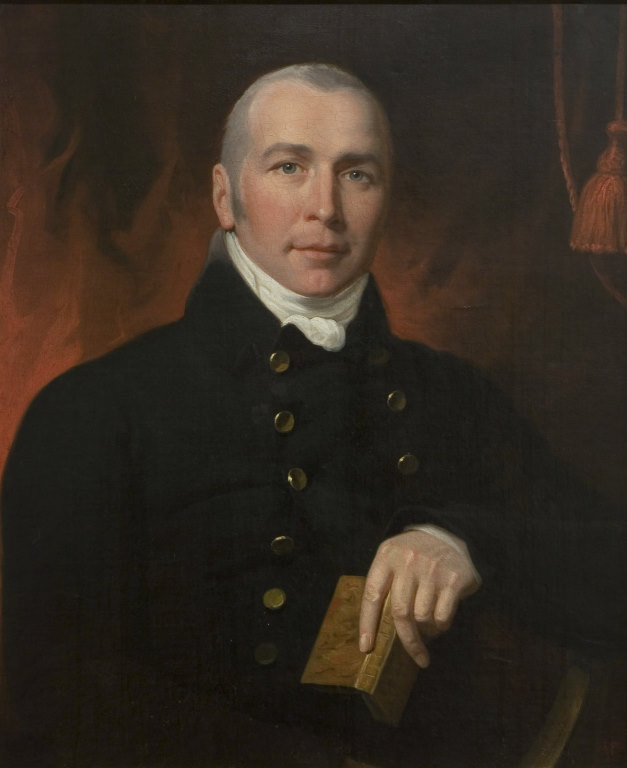
John Hoppner - Portrait of Doctor Simmons, Physician to King George III - 1940-12-10 - Auckland Art Gallery

Samuel Foart Simmons, FRS (17 March 1750 – 23 April 1813) was a British physician.

He was born in Sandwich, Kent and educated at a seminary in France. He started to study medicine in Edinburgh, but after three years he moved to Holland, and qualified as a doctor of medicine at Leyden in 1776. He then visited Groningen, Aix-la-Chapelle and various universities in Germany.

He returned to England and was admitted a Licentiate of the Royal College of Surgeons in 1778. In 1780 he was appointed physician to the Westminster dispensary and in 1781 physician to St Luke's Hospital for Lunatics, dealing from that time onwards mainly with cases of insanity and acquiring a high reputation.

He was elected a Fellow of the Royal Society in 1779 and delivered their Croonian Lecture in 1784 on the Irritability of the Muscular Fibres. He was also made a Fellow of the Society of Antiquaries of London in 1791. He was elected President of the London Medical Society in 1780.

He was for many years the sole editor of the "London Medical Journal" and " Medical Facts and Observations." He was also the compiler of the "Medical Register", an early Medical Directory.

In 1804 he was appointed one of the mentally deranged King George III's physicians extraordinary. He resigned his position at St Luke’s hospital in 1811, but was retained as a consulting physician. He died at his house in Poland Street, London and was buried in the churchyard of St Clement’s, Sandwich. He left one son, Richard Simmons, who was also a physician and Fellow of the Royal College of Surgeons and the Royal Society.

== Written works ==
- Elements of Anatomy and the Animal Economy. Translated from the French of M. Person, with Notes. London, 1775.
- Observations on the Cure of the Gonorrhoea. London, 1780.
- An Account of the Tenia, and the Method of treating it, as practised at Morat, in Switzerland. London, 1778.
- Practical Observations on the Treatment of Consumption. London, 1780.
- An Account of the Life and Writings of Dr. William Hunter. London, 1783.
