= Anthony Fothergill (physician) =

English physician

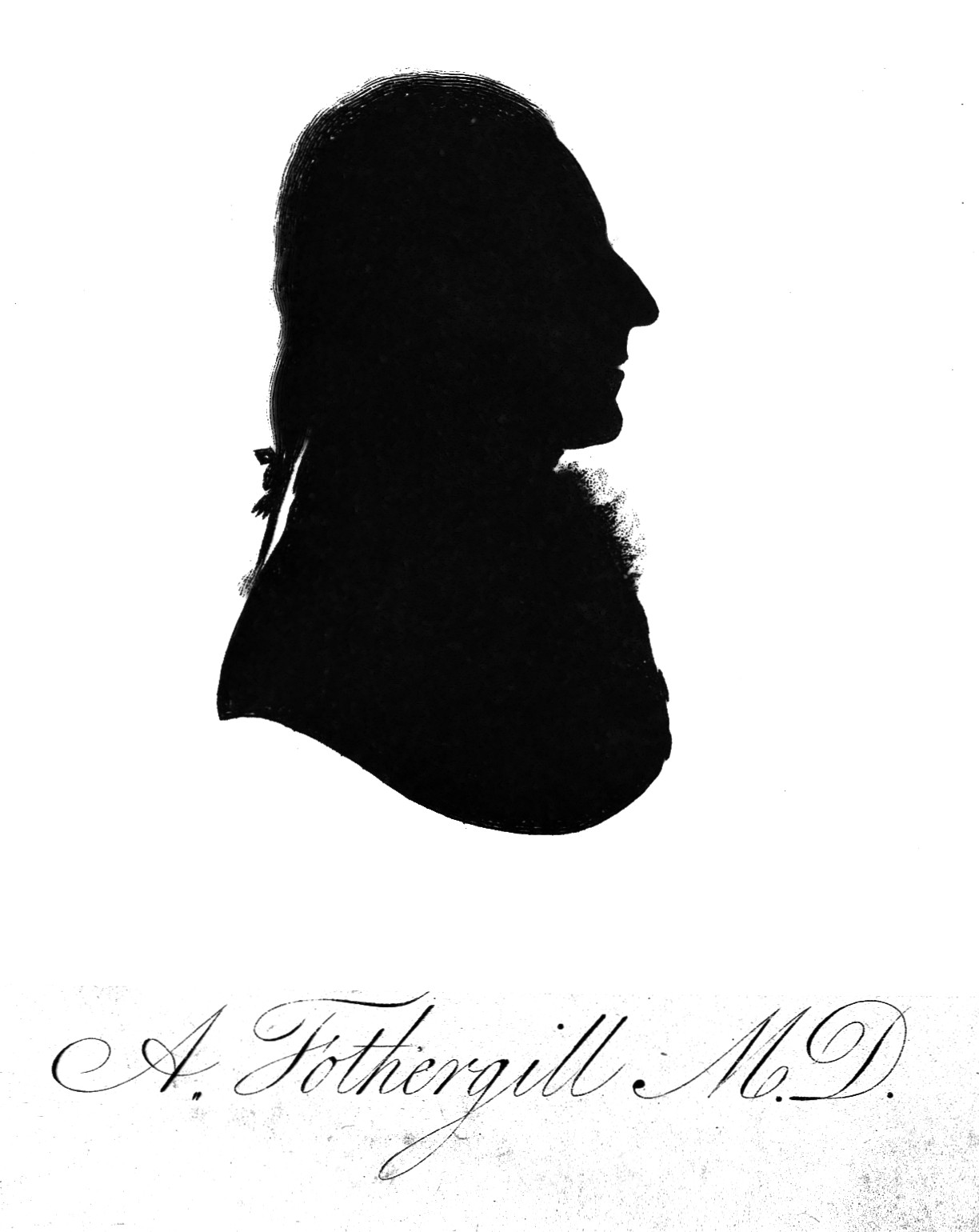
- Born: Sedbergh, Yorkshire
- Died: London
- Occupation: Physician

Anthony Fothergill (c.1732–1813) was an English physician.

== Life ==
Fothergill was born in 1732, or, according to other accounts, 1735, in Sedbergh, Yorkshire. He was educated at Sedbergh School and went on to study medicine at the University of Edinburgh, where he graduated M.D. October 1763 with a dissertation 'De Febre Intermittente,’ and afterwards continued his studies at Leyden and Paris.

== Medical career ==
On the advice of John Fothergill (a friend, but not a close relation), he settled as a physician at Northampton. After some early difficulties, he was successful in practice, and was in 1774 appointed physician to the Northampton Infirmary. He was admitted licentiate of the College of Physicians 30 September 1779, and a Fellow of the Royal Society in 1778. On the death of John Fothergill, in 1780, Anthony moved to London, and established himself in the house in Harpur Street, Red Lion Square, formerly occupied by his namesake, in the hope of succeeding to his professional business. Not prospering in London he moved in 1784 to Bath, where he acquired a large and lucrative practice. In 1792, he was elected to the American Philosophical Society in Philadelphia.

== Retirement ==
In 1803 he retired from active life, and went to Philadelphia in the US, where he lived for some years, and where he apparently intended to pass the rest of his days, but was recalled to England by the prospect of war in 1812, and died in London 11 May 1813. By his will he left a considerable part of his large fortune to charitable institutions in London, Bath, and Philadelphia. In particular his will made provision for the awarding of an annual prize by the London Medical Society for the best essay on a given topic. The prize is known as the Fothergillian prize and is now awarded every three years.

== Works ==
His will also set aside £1,000 to publishing his works: the editing and selection he desired to be undertaken by his friend Dr Lettsom. Lettsom died two years later, and no selection from the manuscripts, in twelve folio volumes, was made for publication.

Fothergill had chemical knowledge, which he made use of in analysing mineral waters. But he was best known for his researches and publications on the methods of restoring persons apparently dead from drowning; for his essay on this subject he received, in 1794, a gold medal from the Royal Humane Society. His other medical books have mostly some reference to health or diet, and he published a number of records of cases.

== Bibliography ==
- Hints for Restoring Animation, and for Preserving Mankind against Noxious Vapours, 3rd ed., London: Munk, 1783.
- Experimental Enquiry into Nature of the Cheltenham Water, Bath, 1785, 1788, etc.
- Cautions to the Heads of Families, in Three Essays, Bath and London: Printed by R. Cruttwell, 1790.
- A New Enquiry into the Suspension of Vital Action in Cases of Drowning and Suffocation, London, 1795; Bath, 1795, etc. (prize essay).
- Essay on the Abuse of Spirituous Liquors, Bath, 1796.
- A Preservative Plan, or Hints for Preservation of Persons Exposed to Accidents which Suspend Vital Action, London, 1798.
- On the Nature of the Disease produced by Bite of a Mad Dog, Bath, 1799.
- On Preservation of Shipwrecked Mariners, London, 1799, in answer to prize questions of the Royal Humane Society.

Some of these books are virtually repetitions of earlier ones; the fourth and sixth were translated into German:

- In Philosophical Transactions, volume LXIX, he wrote "On a Cure of St. Vitus's Dance by Electricity", and one other paper.
- He contributed seven papers to Memoirs of Medical Society of London, including "On the Epidemic Catarrh, or Influenza, at Northampton in 1775" (volume III).
- On Arteriotomy in Epilepsy, volume V, etc.
- Also memoirs in Medical Observations and Enquiries, volume III, 1767, and in Medical Commentaries, volume II.
- In Gentleman's Magazine, volume LXXXI, part I, page 367, he published a poem on the "Triumvirate of Worthies, Howard, Hawes, and Berchtold".
