= George Pilcher =

George Pilcher (1801–1855) was an English aural surgeon and medical reformer.

== Life ==
George Pilcher was a son of Jeremiah Pilcher of Winkfield, Berkshire. He was born on 30 April 1801. George Pilcher was brother to William Humphrey Pilcher and John Giles Pilcher.

Pilcher was admitted a member of the Royal College of Surgeons of England on 2 April 1824. Immediately afterwards he began to practise as a surgeon in Dean Street, Soho, London, and was soon appointed lecturer on anatomy, physiology, and surgery at the Webb Street school of medicine, Snow's Fields, then belonging to his brother-in-law, Richard Dugard Grainger. His lectures on comparative anatomy drew on Henri Marie Ducrotay de Blainville. Desmond associates Pilcher at Webb Street with Benthamite views, shared with Thomas Southwood Smith.

Pilcher was for many years consulting surgeon to the Surrey Dispensary. As a professional he had to contend in his field with the quackery of John Harrison Curtis, as did James Yearsley and Joseph Toynbee.

In 1838 Pilcher was awarded the Fothergillian prize for his treatise On the Structure and Pathology of the Ear, and in 1842 he was elected president of the Medical Society of London. When the Webb Street school was reabsorbed into the Borough hospitals from which it had originally sprung, Pilcher became attached to Lane's school, which was affiliated to St George's Hospital. At that hospital he became lecturer on surgery on 6 July 1843, and in the same year he was made an honorary fellow of the Royal College of Surgeons of England. In 1849 he was admitted a member of its council.

Pilcher died suddenly on 7 November 1855, and was buried in Kensal Green cemetery.

== Pilcher v Rawlins ==
Pilcher would have become embroiled in the notable opposition referenced as Pilcher v Rawlins in the Court of Chancery had he lived as long as 1872. This case, which is complex and often employed as a justification of the Torrens title system, stemmed from a trust executed by his father, Jeremiah, on 23 August 1830, involved a mortgage transaction entered into by his brother William Humphrey Pilcher, and was only resolved by judgment of Lord Hatherley:

=== Summary of Hatherley judgment ===
The defence of purchase for value without notice may be sustained, although the Defendant, in order to make out his title to the legal estate, must rely on an instrument which discloses the title of the Plaintiff, the Defendant not having had notice of such instrument at the time of his purchase.

The trustees of a settlement advanced the trust money on the security of real property which was conveyed to them by the mortgagor, the mortgage deed noticing the trust. The surviving trustee of the settlement afterwards reconveyed part of the property to the mortgagor on payment of part of the mortgage money, which he appropriated. The mortgagor then conveyed that part of the property to new mortgagees, concealing, with the connivance of the trustee, both the prior mortgage and the reconveyance. When the fraud was discovered, the cestuis que trust under the settlement filed a bill against the new mortgagees claiming priority:

Held, that the Court would not interfere to take away the legal estate which passed to the new mortgagees under the reconveyance.

The trustees of a settlement advanced the trust money on the security of real property which was conveyed to them by the mortgagor, the mortgage deed noticing the trust. The surviving trustee afterwards induced the mortgagor to execute a deed by which the mortgaged property purported to be conveyed to the trustee as on a purchase by him, though no money in fact passed. The trustee then, concealing the prior mortgage, and shewing title under the pretended purchase deed, conveyed the property to a mortgagee without notice:

- Held, that the Court would not interfere to take away the legal estate from the mortgagee.
- Decree of the Master of the Rolls reversed.
- Carter v. Carter disapproved of.

== Works ==
Pilcher published:

- Essay on the Physiology of the Excito-motory System, read before the Medical Society, 1835.
- The Structure, Economy, and Diseases of the Ear, with plates, London, 1838; 2nd edit. 1842.
- Some Points in the Physiology of the Tympanum, read before the physiological section of the Medical Society of London, 23 February 1854.
