= William Henry Allchin =

American physician and lecturer

Sir William Allchin FRCP FRSE
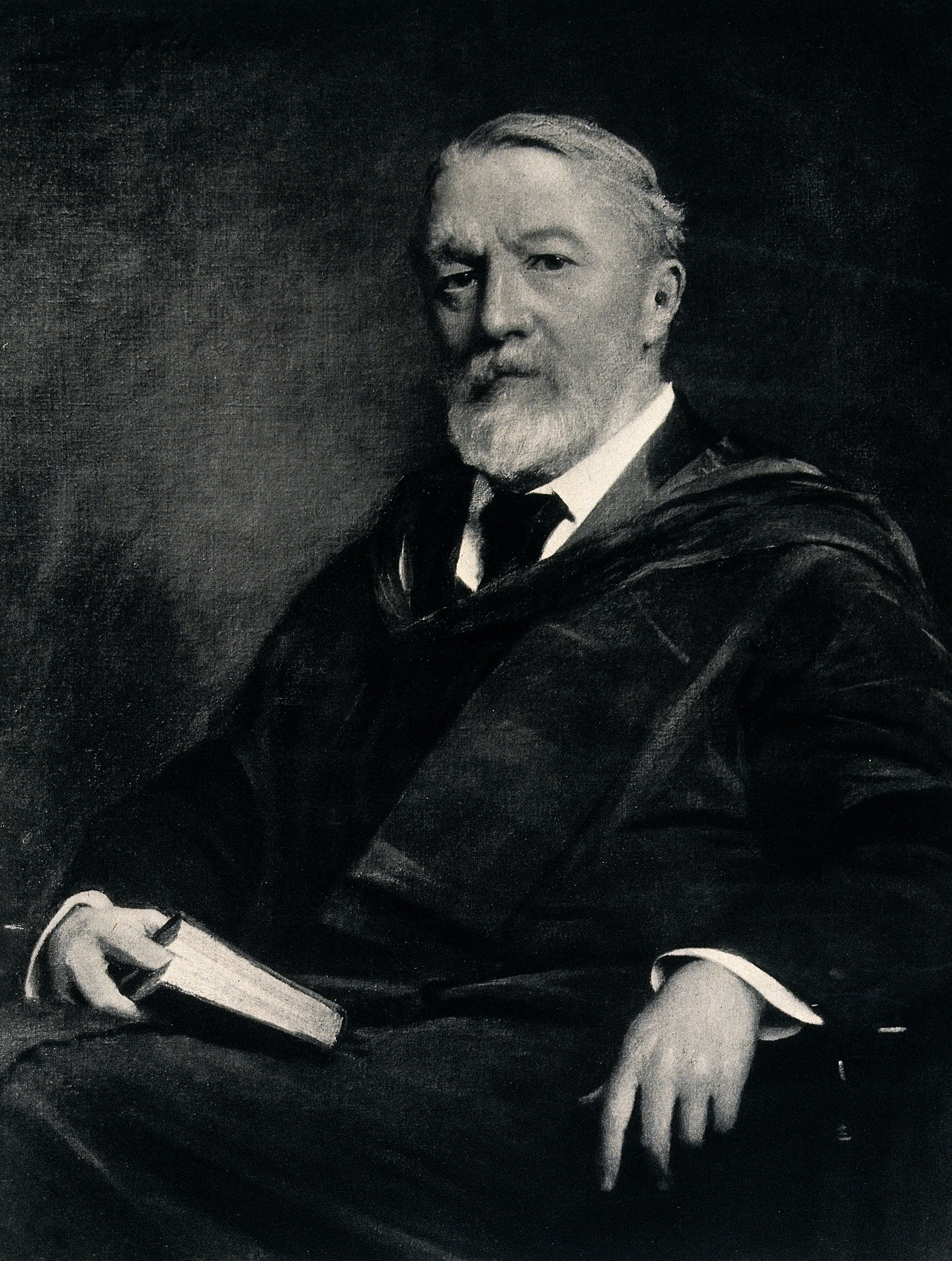
- Born: 16 October 1846; Paris
- Died: 8 February 1912 (aged 65); East Malling, Kent
- Occupation: Physician

Sir William Henry Allchin (1846–1912) was an English physician and lecturer on comparative anatomy, physiology, pathology and medicine. He was knighted in 1907.

== Biography ==
Born in Paris, William Allchin was the eldest son of a physician from Bayswater and entered University College, London to study medicine. He served as chief surgeon of the SS Great Eastern for 5 years when the ship was laying cable. He graduated from University College, London as M.B. in 1871. At Westminster Hospital he became an assistant physician in 1873 and a physician in 1877 and dean from 1878 to 1883 and again from 1890 to 1893; he retired from the hospital staff in 1905. Allchin was the editor of the Manual of Medicine and a contributor to Quain’s Dictionary of Medicine, Allbutt’s System of Medicine, and Keating's Cyclopaedia of the Diseases of Children.

On 19 August 1880, Allchin married Margaret, daughter of Alexander Holland of New York.

== Honours ==
- 1891 — Bradshaw Lecturer
- 1901 — President of the Medical Society of London
- 1903 — Harveian Orator
- 1905 — Lumleian Lecturer
- 1907 — Knighthood
- 1910 — Physician-Extraordinary to King George V
