= Little Jost Van Dyke =

Island in the British Virgin Islands

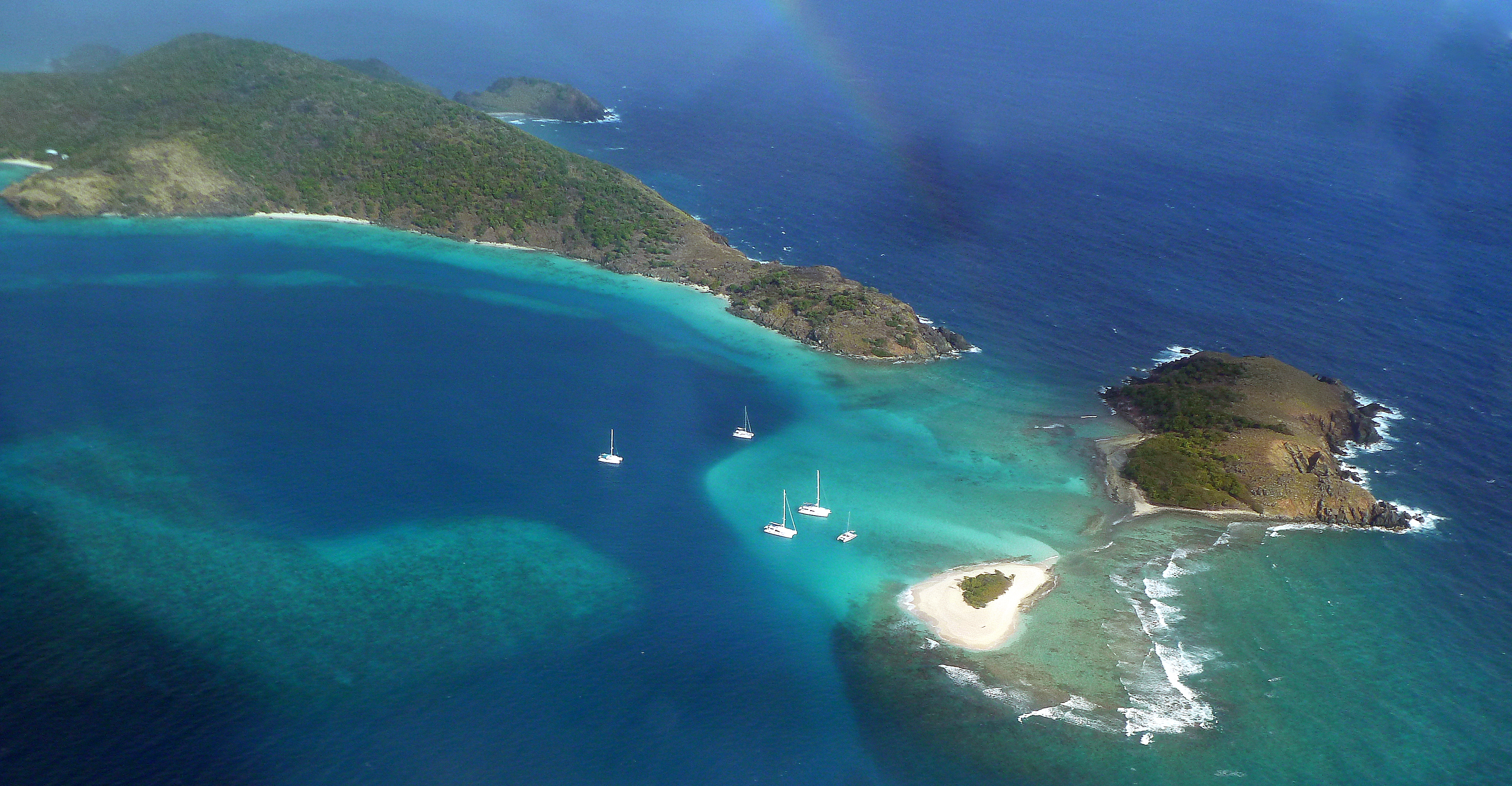
- Little Jost Van Dyke at upper left

- The location of Little Jost Van Dyke within the British Virgin Islands

- Location within British Virgin Islands Location within the Caribbean

Geography
- Location: Caribbean Sea
- Coordinates: 18°27′13″N 64°43′15″W
- Archipelago: Virgin Islands

Administration
- United Kingdom
- British Overseas Territory: British Virgin Islands

Demographics
- Population: 0

Additional information
- Time zone: AST (UTC-4)
- ISO code: VG

Little Jost Van Dyke is an uninhabited island in the British Virgin Islands. It is a small island near the larger Jost Van Dyke. The island was occupied by the Lettsom family and their slaves in the 18th century and it continued to have a small population in the 19th century.

== History ==
Little Jost Van Dyke was unoccupied before the 1720s. The Lettsom family owned the island from the 1720s to 1790s and lived on it with their slaves from the 1720s to 1780s.

John Hart, the governor of the British Leeward Islands, granted the island to John Lettsom. The grant was backdated to 16 July 1725, but was not formally recorded until 1739. This grant was recognising the present settlement by the Lettsom family that already existed on the island.

John died in the 1740s and ownership passed to Edward and Mary. Edward died in 1758, and Mary married Samuel Taine; Mary and Samuel continued to live on the island. The last known record of Mary is from 1770, and she is believed to have died in 1781.

John Coakley Lettsom gave power of attorney to Henry Hollis Floriman in 1809 so that he could sell all of his land in the British Virgin Islands. Little Jost Van Dyke was sold, but no records survive. The Gordon family is recorded as owning the island from 1861 to 1874, when it was sold to Edward Vanterpool, Joseph Armstrong, and Sarah Hatchet for $110. The Vanterpool family currently owns the western portion of the island while the remainder is crown land.

The population of the island was no greater than 35 in the 18th century. The population fell to around five after 1767, and the island was reported as unoccupied by William Thornton in 1791. All five people living on the island in 1815 were slaves. There was a maximum population of 10 in the 19th century.

Cotton was produced on the island with 3 acres producing 450 pounds of cotton in 1815, and 5 acres producing 750 pounds in 1823.

Archaeological work was conducted on the island from 2008 to 2010.

== Geography ==
Little Jost van Dyke is close to the larger island of Jost Van Dyke and three miles northwest of Tortola. The highest point of the island is over 300 feet (91 m). The coastline is around 5,150 metres (16,900 ft) in length.

== Environment ==
In 1823, 90% of the land on the island was classified as forest or pasture. Pilosocereus royenii, melocactus intortus, and manchineel are present on the island.

== Notable people ==
- John Coakley Lettsom, British physician

== Works cited ==
=== Books ===
- Chenoweth, John (2017). Simplicity, Equality, and Slavery: An Archaeology of Quakerism in the British Virgin Islands, 1740-1780. University Press of Florida. ISBN 9781683400165.
- Hickman, Clare (2021). The Doctor's Garden: Medicine, Science, and Horticulture in Britain. Yale University Press. ISBN 9780300236101.

=== Journals ===
- Chenoweth, John (2018). "Marine Shell and Small-Island Slavery in the Caribbean". Historical Archaeology. 52 (2). Springer Nature: 467–488. doi:10.2307/48700179. JSTOR 48700179.
- Chenoweth, John (2014). "Practicing and Preaching Quakerism: Creating a Religion of Peace on a Slavery-Era Plantation". American Anthropologist. 116 (1). Wiley-Blackwell: 94–109. doi:10.2307/24028895. JSTOR 24028895.
