= Gordon Gordon-Taylor =

British surgeon

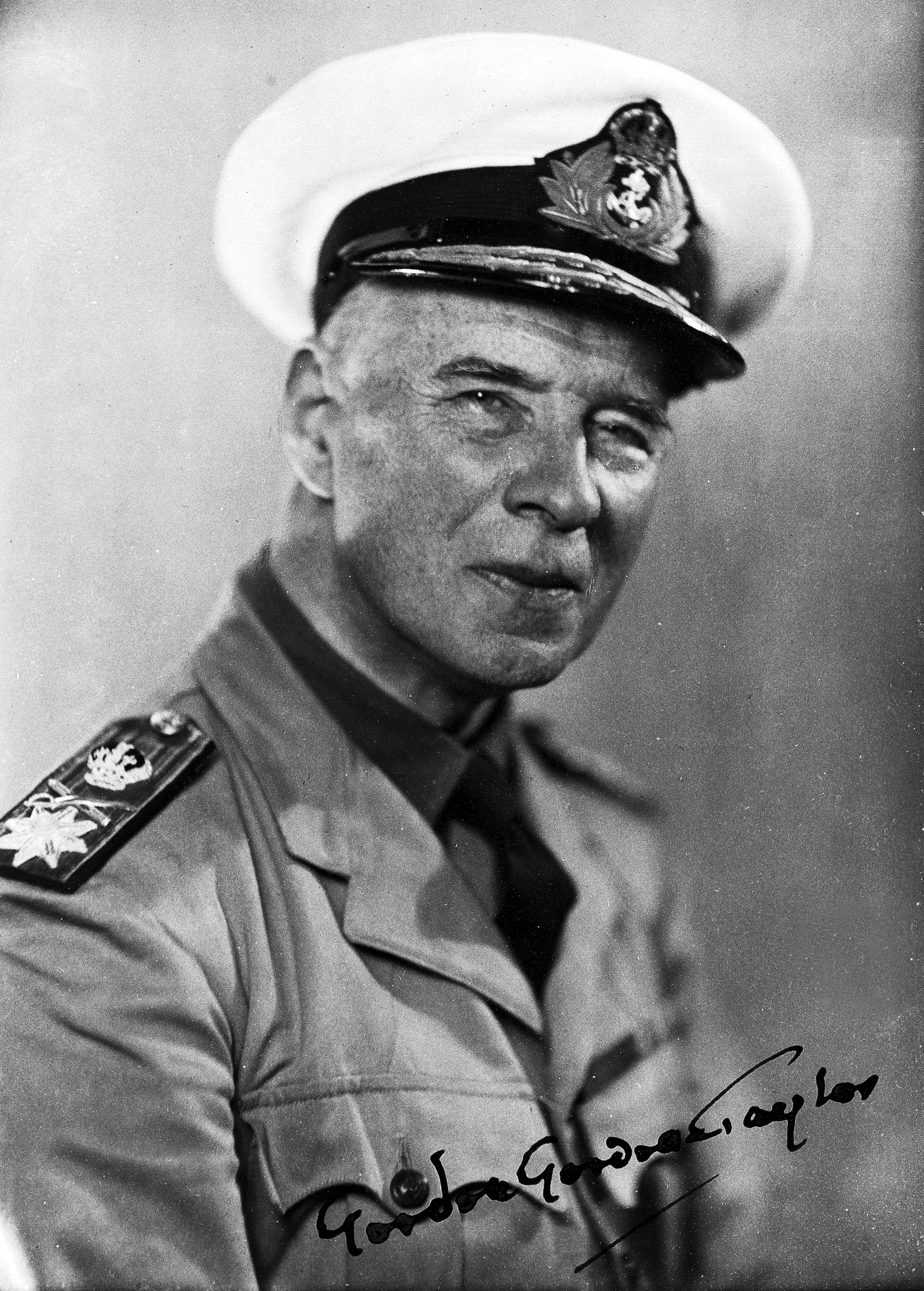
Gordon Gordon-Taylor in naval uniform

Sir Gordon Gordon-Taylor CB KBE FRCS FACS (né William Gordon Taylor, 18 March 1878 – 3 September 1960) was a British surgeon.

He was born William Gordon Taylor, the only son of wine merchant John Taylor of London Bridge, but was moved to Aberdeen in 1885 after the death of his father. There he was educated at Gordon College and Aberdeen University (MA, 1903). The family returned to London and he entered the Middlesex Hospital school, graduating first-class honours B.Sc in anatomy in 1904. After working as a surgeon to out-patients at the Royal Northern Hospital in north London was appointed in 1907 Assistant Surgeon at the Middlesex Hospital.

During the First World War he was made a Captain in the RAMC in March 1915 and served first at home and then in France, where he was involved in the battles of the Somme and Passchendaele. Promoted to Major, he later acted as consulting surgeon to the 4th Army, and was awarded the OBE. After returning to England in December 1918, he established a worldwide reputation as a surgeon, pioneering the techniques of blood transfusion. His main interests lay in the surgical treatment of breast, mouth and pharynx afflictions.

During the Second World War he served as a Surgeon Rear-Admiral in the Royal Navy. After his retirement during the war he gave lectures to several medical societies and was elected President of the Medical Society of London in 1941-42, the Association of Surgeons of Great Britain and Ireland in 1944-45 and the Royal Society of Medicine in 1944-5. He was knighted CB in 1942 and KBE in 1946.

He died in 1960 having been run over by a lorry outside Lord's cricket ground. He had married Florence Mary FRSA, FZS, eldest daughter of John Pegrume.

== Published works ==
- The Dramatic in Surgery. Bristol, Wright, 1930
- The Abdominal Injuries of Warfare. Bristol, Wright, 1939.
- Sir Charles Bell, his life and times, with E A Walls. Edinburgh, Livingstone, 1958.
- On Cancer of the Breast, Br. Med. J. 1, 455. Mitchell Banks Lecture, 1959.
- On Malignant Disease of the Testis, Proc. R. Soc. Med. 41, 118, 1948.
- On the Oro-pharynx Br. J. Surg. 35, 6, with N R Wyndham, 1947.
- On Retroperitoneal and Mesenteric Tumours, Proc. R. Soc. Med. 26, 889, 1933.
- On the Hindquarter Amputation, Roy. Melb. Hosp. clin. Rep. Centenary Volume, p. 189, 1948.
- War injuries of the chest and abdomen. Br. J. Surg., Supplement 3., 1955.
