= Walter Carr (physician) =

English physician and surgeon (1862–1942)

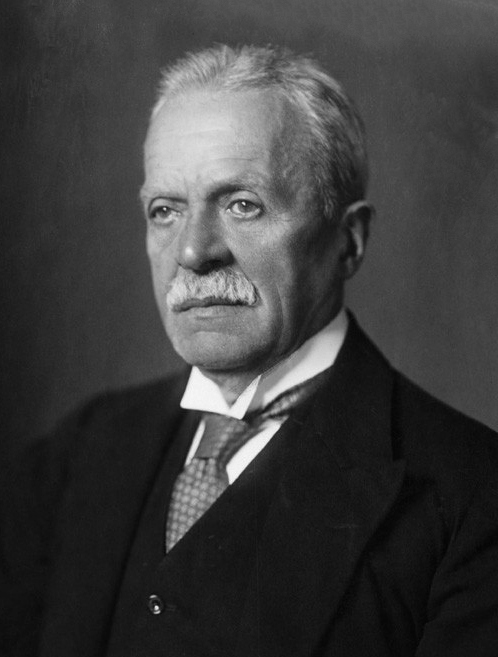
John Walter Carr

John Walter Carr CBE FRCP FRCS (1862 – 29 September 1942) was an English physician and surgeon.

Carr was the son of John Carr of London. He was educated at University College School and trained as a doctor at University College Hospital, graduating Bachelor of Surgery (BS) and Doctor of Medicine (MD). He later became consulting physician to the Royal Free Hospital and the Victoria Hospital for Children and lecturer in medicine at the London School of Medicine for Women.

Carr was appointed Commander of the Order of the British Empire (CBE) in January 1920 for services in the First World War. In 1928 he was elected president of the Medical Society of London.

In 1895 he married Jessie Griffith (who died in 1937); they had one son and three daughters.
