= Henry Clutterbuck (writer) =

Henry Clutterbuck M.D. (1767–1856) was an English medical writer.

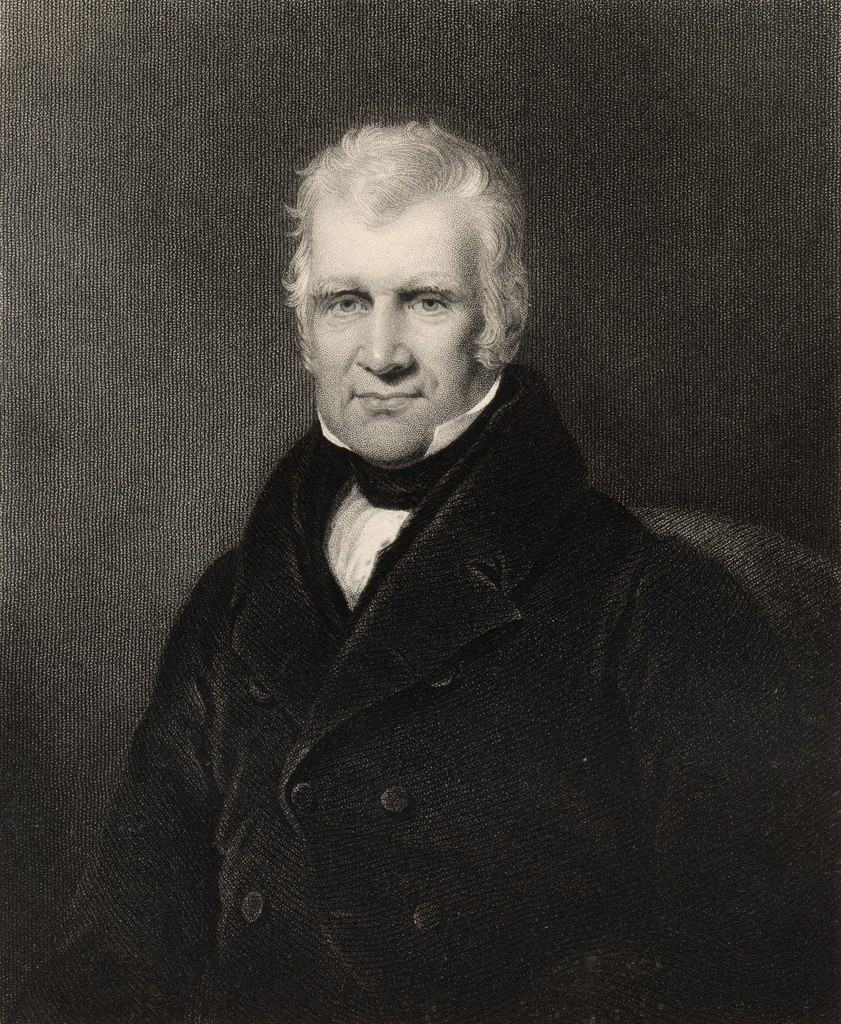
Henry Clutterbuck, by John Cochran (after Henry Room), published c. 1820.

== Life ==
Clutterbuck was the fifth child of Thomas Clutterbuck, attorney, who died at Marazion in Cornwall 6 November 1781, by his wife, Mary, a daughter of Christopher Masterman, merchant, Truro. He was born at Marazion, 28 January 1767, and commenced the study of medicine by an apprenticeship to James Kempe, a surgeon at Truro, and at the age of twenty-one came to London, when he entered the United Borough Hospitals. On 7 August. 1790 he passed as a member of the College of Surgeons, and settled as a general practitioner at Walbrook in the City of London.

Five years later he began publication of The Medical and Chirurgical Review, a journal which appeared twice each month, of which he was the projector, editor, and almost sole writer, and which he continued until 1807. Determining to qualify as a physician, he, in 1802, proceeded to Edinburgh for one year, but then transferred himself to Glasgow, where he graduated doctor of medicine, 16 April 1804. Returning to the metropolis, he established himself at 17 St. Paul's Churchyard, and on 1 October 1804 was admitted a licentiate of the College of Physicians. He removed to Bridge Street, Blackfriars, in 1808, was elected physician to the General Dispensary, Aldersgate Street, in 1809, and about that time began to lecture on materia medica and the practice of physic. His lectures were plain, forcible, and unadorned, full of facts and free from speculations. His receipts from his lectures in one year are said to have exceeded a thousand pounds.

In 1809 he sent to the press his Inquiry into the Seat and Nature of Fever. From this period Clutterbuck's reputation and business steadily increased, and he soon took a position among the first physicians in the city. For more than fifty years he was a regular attendant at the meetings of the Medical Society of London, where he was known as an effective speaker.

Clutterbuck was run over in the street on leaving the anniversary meeting of the Medical Society of London, 8 March 1856, and died at his house, 1 Crescent, New Bridge Street, Blackfriars, on 24 April 1856. He retained his faculties to the last, and is said to have seen patients on the very day he died.

A portrait of him is in the meeting-room of the Medical Society of London. He married in 1796, at Walbrook Church, Harriet Matilda, daughter of William Browne of Kirby Street, Hatton Garden, attorney-at-law, by whom he had ten children. One of his daughters, Julia, married James Tod.

== Publications ==
1. An Account of a New Method of treating Affections which arise from the Poison of Lead 1794
2. Remarks respecting Venereal Disease 1799
3. Tentamen Pathologicum Inaugurale quaedam de Sede et Natura Febris proponens 1804
4. An Enquiry into the Seat and Nature of Fever 1807; ²1825
5. Observations on the Epidemic Fever at present prevailing 1819
6. An Essay on Pyrexia or Symptomatic Fever 1837
7. On the Proper Administration of Blood Letting 1840
8. A brief Memoir of G. Birkbeck, M.D. 1842
9. A Series of Essays on Inflammation 1846.

besides many papers to the medical press.
