= Raymond M. Kirk =

British surgeon and academic (1923–2019)

Raymond Maurice Kirk (31 October 1923 – 31 December 2019), better known as Jerry Kirk, was a British surgeon and academic. He was Professor of Surgery at University College London and Honorary Consulting Surgeon at the Royal Free Hospital.

The start of Kirk’s career was delayed by the Second World War. Between 1942 and 1946, he served in the cruiser HMS Ajax during Operation Torch – the first combined American-British landings in North Africa. Later he was given charge of a minesweeper BYMS 2026 in the Mediterranean Sea. This ship was later loaned as RV Calypso to explorer Jacques Cousteau in the 1950s, who used it as a filming base for several films.

Following WWII, Kirk attended Undergraduate Medical School at King's College London and Charing Cross Hospital. He became an Anatomy Lecturer at King's College London and went on to attend Postgraduate Medical School at Hammersmith Hospital with Prof. Ian Aird. After holding registrarships at both Charing Cross Hospital and the Royal Free Hospital, he became a Consultant General Surgeon at the Royal Free Group (1964). He was also a member of the Council of the Royal College of Surgeons of England, and devised the original basic surgical skills (BSS) course, as well as the first minimal access course, alongside Prof. Sir. Alfred Cuschieri. He was the Director of the Overseas Doctors Training Scheme, and was editor of the Annals of the Royal College of Surgeons of England.

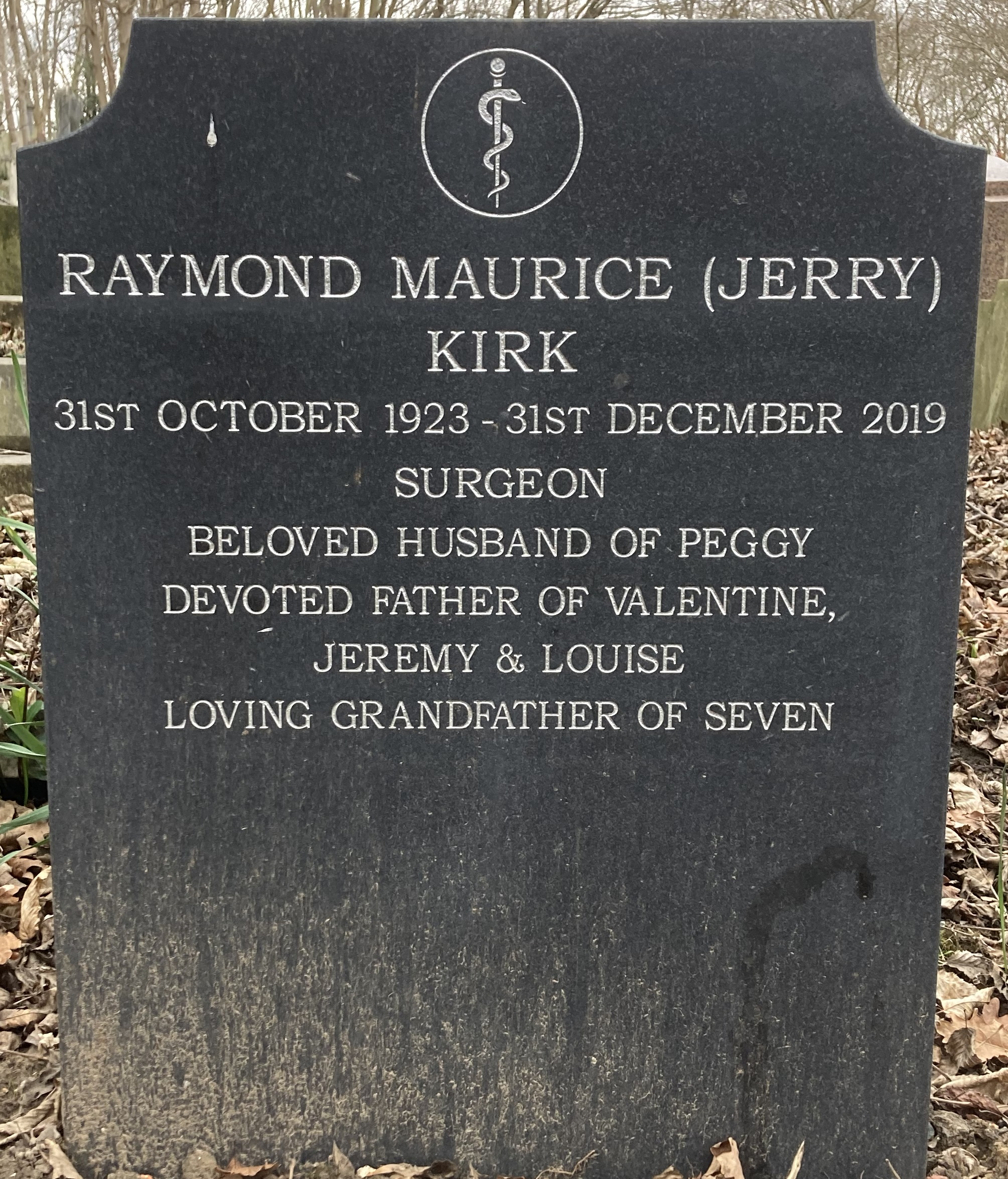
Grave of Raymond M. Kirk in Highgate Cemetery

After retiring from the NHS in 1989, Kirk was appointed an Honorary Consulting Surgeon at the Royal Free Hospital and Honorary Professor of Surgery at University College London. As well as being former President of the Surgical Section of the Royal Society of Medicine, the Medical Society of London and the Hunterian Society, he has also written numerous books on General Surgery and Surgical Technique for training surgeons. He holds Honorary Fellowships of the Association of Surgeons of Poland and the College of Surgeons of Sri Lanka. He is a Fellow of the Royal Society of Medicine.

Kirk had three children and seven grandchildren. He died in December 2019 at the age of 96 and was buried on the eastern side of Highgate Cemetery.

== Bibliography ==
- R. Novell, D.M. Baker, N. Goddard (2013) Kirk's General Surgical Operations (Sixth edition). Elsevier: Churchill-Livingstone. ISBN 978-0-7020-4482-3
- R. M. Kirk, M. C. Winslet (2007) Essential General Surgical Operations (Second edition). Elsevier: Churchill-Livingstone. ISBN 978-0-443-10314-8
- R. M. Kirk (2010) Basic Surgical Techniques (Sixth edition). Elsevier: Churchill-Livingstone. ISBN 978-0-7020-3391-9
