= John Coakley Lettsom =

British physician and abolitionist (1744–1815)

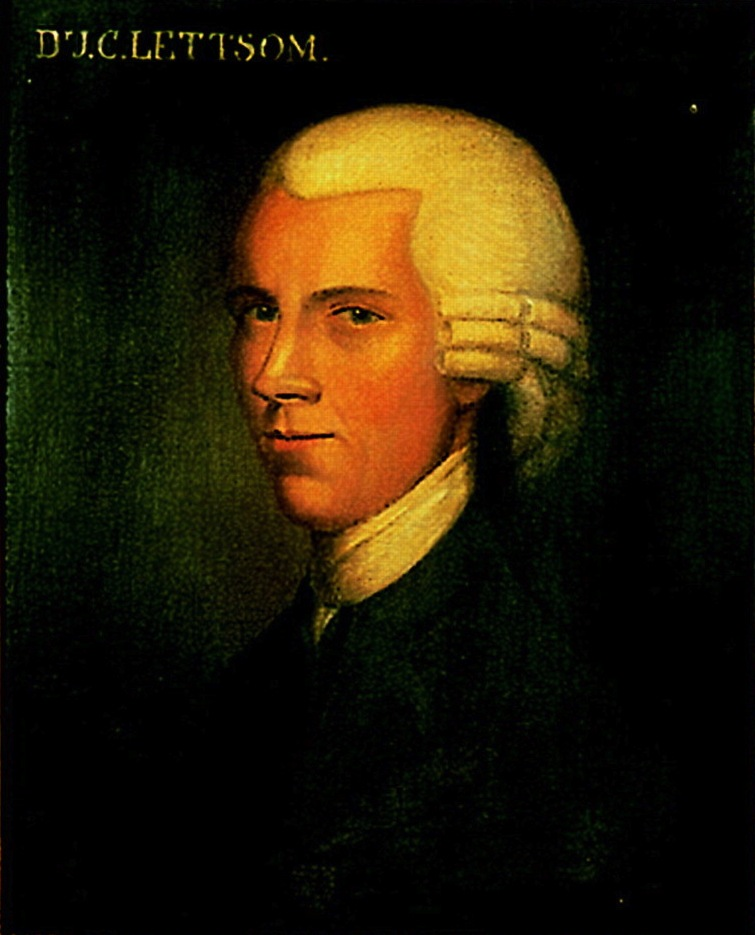
- Born: 1744
- Died: 1 November 1815 (aged 70–71)
- Known for: Founding Medical Society of London

John Coakley Lettsom FRS (1744 – 1 November 1815) was a British physician and philanthropist born on Little Jost Van Dyke in the British Virgin Islands in a Quaker settlement. The son of a West Indian planter and an Irish mother, he grew up to be an abolitionist. He founded the Medical Society of London in 1773, convinced that a combined membership of physicians, surgeons and apothecaries would prove productive. As the oldest such in the United Kingdom, it is housed in London's medical community at Lettsome House, Chandos Street, near Cavendish Square. Lettsom was its mainstay, as founder, president (1775–1776, 1784–1785, 1808–1811 and 1813–1815) and benefactor.

== Life ==
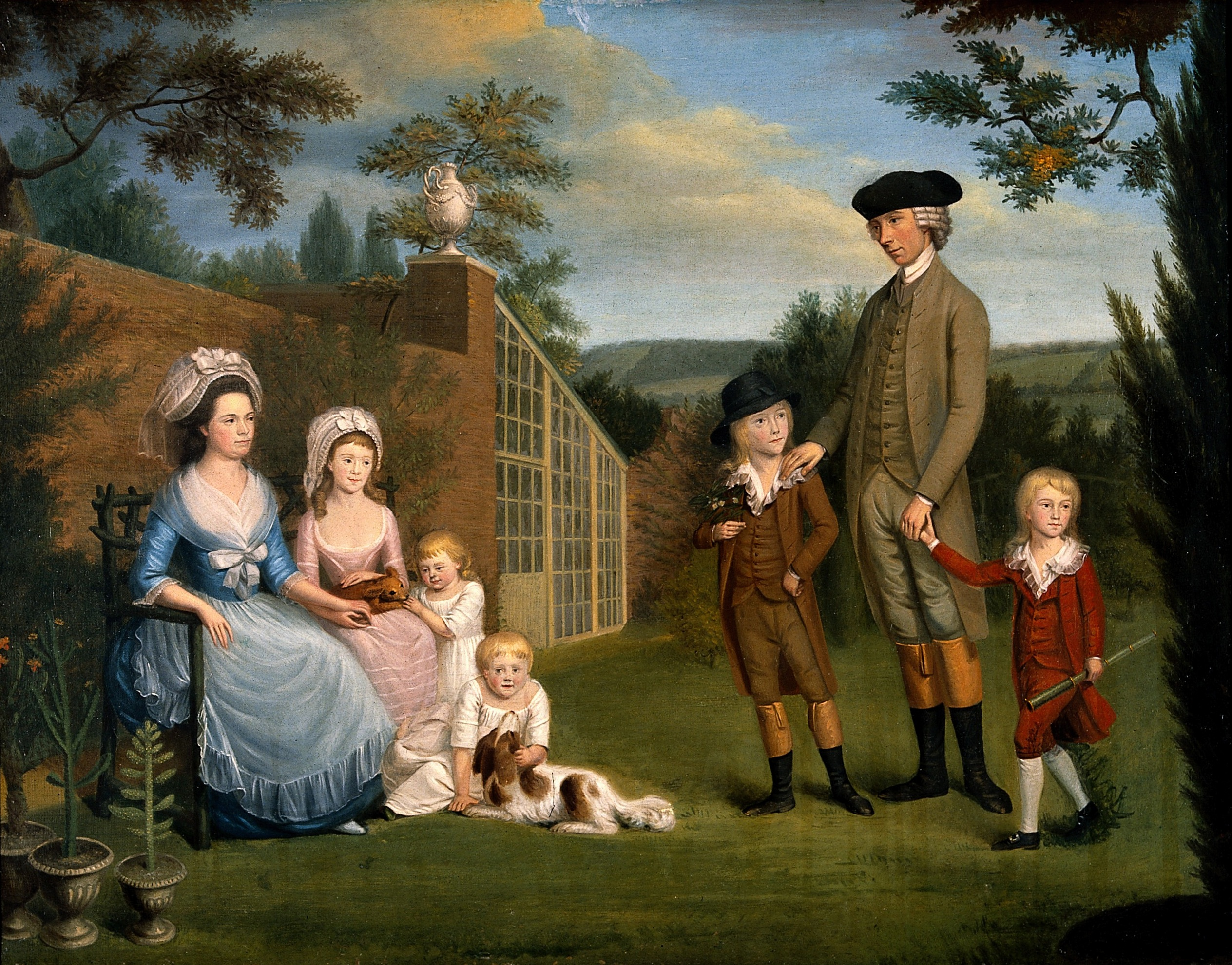
John Coakley Lettsom (1744-1 Nov 1815), physician, with his family in his garden at Grove Hill, Camberwell, Surrey. Oil painting by unknown English artist, c. 1786 Wellcome Library

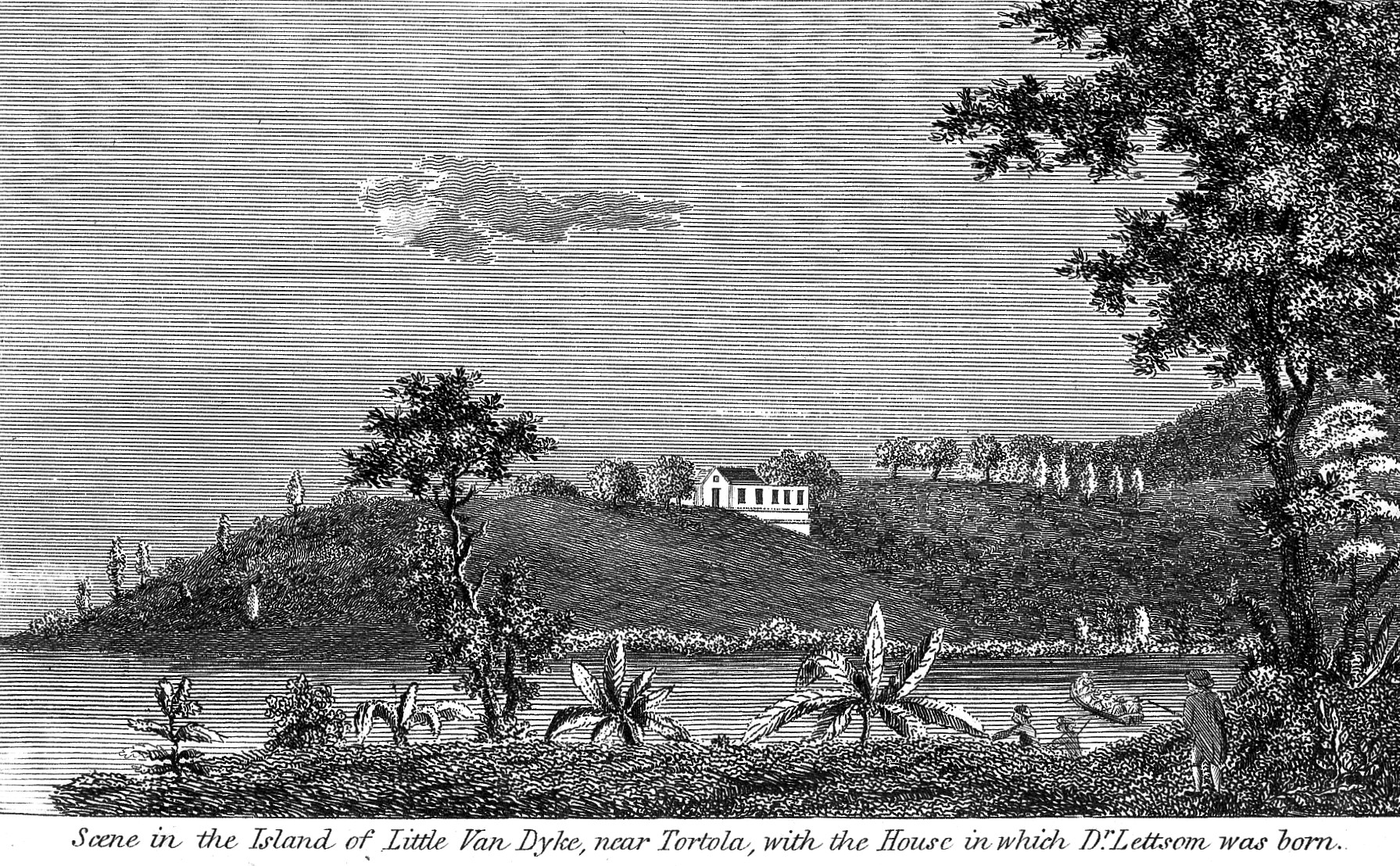
The house where J.C. Lettsom was born

John Coakley Lettsom was born into the Quaker community on the island of Little Jost Van Dyke in the British Virgin Islands, in 1744. John and his brother were the sole survivors of seven sets of male twins, sons of Edward and Mary Lettsom. John alone was sent to England at the age of six to be educated.

At school in Lancashire the antics of the young Lettsom attracted the attention of the Quaker preacher Samuel Fothergill, who introduced his protégé to his brother, the London physician, Dr John Fothergill. Having completed an apprenticeship to a Yorkshire apothecary, Lettsom came to London in 1766 and through the influence of Dr Fothergill commenced his medical training at St Thomas' Hospital. His studies were interrupted by the death of his father, prompting his return to Tortola in the British Virgin Islands, where he freed the slaves he had inherited and provided medical care for the local population. As the only doctor in the islands at that time, he was able to earn a considerable sum, his diligence and industry enabling him to resume his studies in Europe. John Coakley Lettsom matriculated at the Leyden University in the Netherlands on 8 June 1769, and received his Medical Doctor degree there on 20 June 1769. His thesis concerns the natural history of the tea-tree.

Lettsom became a close friend of Benjamin Franklin and William Thornton. A fellow founder of the Medical Society of London was Joseph Hooper, who largely forgotten today, was also a founder of the Society for Effecting the Abolition of the Slave Trade. It was Joseph Hooper who brought Lettsom's children into the world.

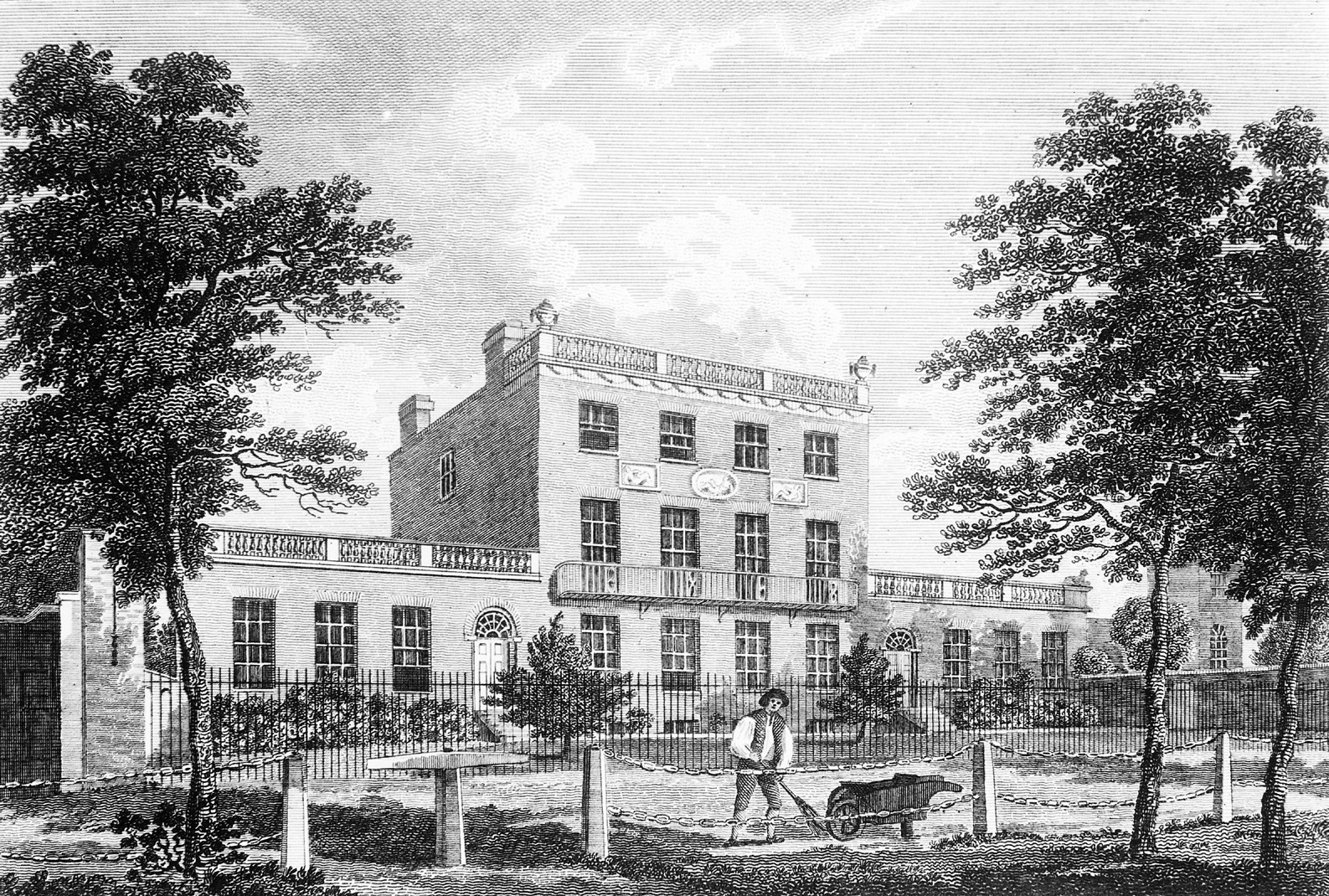
Lettsom's villa at Grove Hill, Camberwell

In 1779 he bought land in Camberwell and had a villa at Grove Hill, away from the pollution of London. The villa was demolished when the estate was broken up in the early 1800s, but one of its cottages, 'The Hermitage' (number 220 Camberwell Grove) survives, at the junction with Grove Hill Road. A side-street, Lettsom Street,; (Note: Junction with Lettsom Street: 51.47008°N 0.08619°W) Lettsom Gardens, (Note: The Hermitage: 51.46659°N 0.08140°W) a community garden; and a nearby housing estate are named in his honour. The cottage is Grade II listed. (Note: The Hermitage: 51.46577°N 0.08314°W)

== Career ==
Lettsom's career accelerated with membership of Royal College of Physicians in London and marriage to Ann (Nancy) Miers (1748-1830), daughter of John Miers. She was born in Crooked Lane, London in about 1760: "A plain stumpy little woman whose only attraction was the large fortune she was known to possess!", but actually a singularly sweet person.

By the age of 30 Lettsom's reputation as a physician, author and Fellow of the Royal Society was established. Furthermore, he had founded the General Dispensary in Aldersgate Street and the Medical Society of London. He was a founder member of the Royal Humane Society in 1774, initiated the Sea-bathing Infirmary at Margate (1791), became a pillar of the Royal Jennerian Society (for vaccination), and gave his support to the Society for the Relief of Widows and Orphans of Medical Men, the Society for the Relief of Debtors, and the Philanthropic Society for homeless children. Numerous other clubs, societies, hospitals, dispensaries, and charitable institutions in the United Kingdom and North America benefited from Lettsom's patronage, while from his pen there flowed a stream of "Hints", pamphlets, diatribes, and letters promoting Sunday schools, female industry, provision for the blind, a bee society, soup kitchens and the mangel-wurzel, while condemning quackery, card parties, and intemperance. In the diversity of his interests, as physician, philanthropist, botanist, mineralogist and collector, Lettsom was in the mould of that giant of the previous generation of London physicians, Sir Hans Sloane. He financed botanical expeditions and cultivated American plants in his garden at Camberwell.

As founder, President (1775–76, 1784–85, 1808–11 and 1813–15) and benefactor of the London Medical Society, Lettsom was the mainstay of the society from 1773 until his death in 1815. His influence remained strong and his example inspired the next generation of fellows - men such as Dr Thomas Pettigrew, his biographer, and Dr Henry Clutterbuck, who followed in Lettsom's footsteps as President of the Society and physician to the General Dispensary. In 1791 Lettsom won the society's Fothergillian Prize for a treatise entitled Diseases of Great Towns and the Best Means of Preventing them.

Lettsom was elected to the American Philosophical Society in 1787. He was elected a Foreign Honorary Member of the American Academy of Arts and Sciences in 1788.

For at least some of his years working in London, he lived in Newington Green, a village full of English Dissenters clustered round a green and its Unitarian church. There he met the young Mary Wollstonecraft and others intent on social reform.

== Humour ==
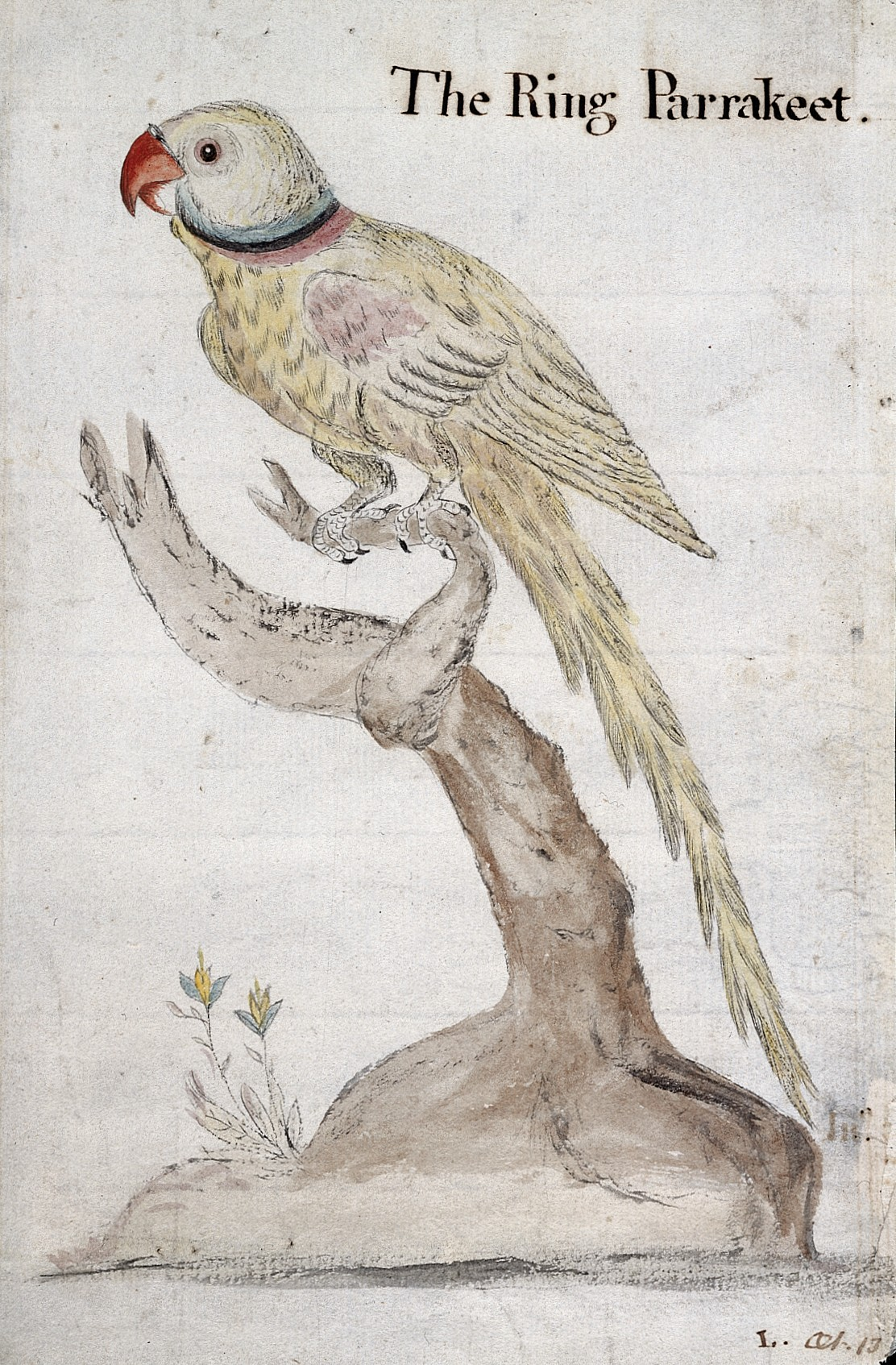
The Ring Parakeet (ring-necked parakeet, Psittacula krameri) painted by Lettsom in 1757

Lettsom is reported to have written the following about himself:

I, John Lettsome,
Blisters, bleeds and sweats 'em.
If, after that, they please to die,
I, John Lettsome.

Richard Woodman attributes similar words to the fictional naval surgeon Mr Lettsom in The Bomb Vessel:

When people's ill, they come to I,
I physics, bleeds and sweats 'em;
Sometime they live, sometimes they die,
What's that to I? I let's 'em.

== Abolitionism ==
Lettsom was also a noted abolitionist. In 1767 he had returned to the British Virgin Islands after the death of his father, and found himself the owner of a share of his father's slaves, whom he promptly manumitted. He then set up a medical practice on Tortola, and as the only physician on the island amassed a small fortune of £2,000, half of which he gave to his mother (who had remarried) and returned to London to continue his medical studies.

When his good friend, William Thornton, sought his advice about setting up a colony for freed slaves on the west coast of Africa, Lettsom counselled against it and suggested spending the money acquiring and manumitting the slaves in North America instead.

At the end of his life, Lettsom's son, Pickering Lettsom, returned to Tortola to practice law and there he married a wealthy widow, Ruth Georges née Hodge, who had inherited some 1,000 slaves from her grandfather, Benzaliel Hodge. Pickering Lettsom died about a month after the marriage, and his new wife (some 16 years his senior) died a few months later on 21 January 1809, leaving all her property to her father-in-law, John Lettsom. By a twist of fate, shortly before his own death, Lettsom, who had freed all the slaves he had ever owned, found himself the owner of another 500 slaves. Lettsome himself died before he could decide what to do with them and they were inherited by his grandson, William Nanson Lettsom; after a long court case, Ruth’s estates were put up for sale in 1825.

== Entomology ==
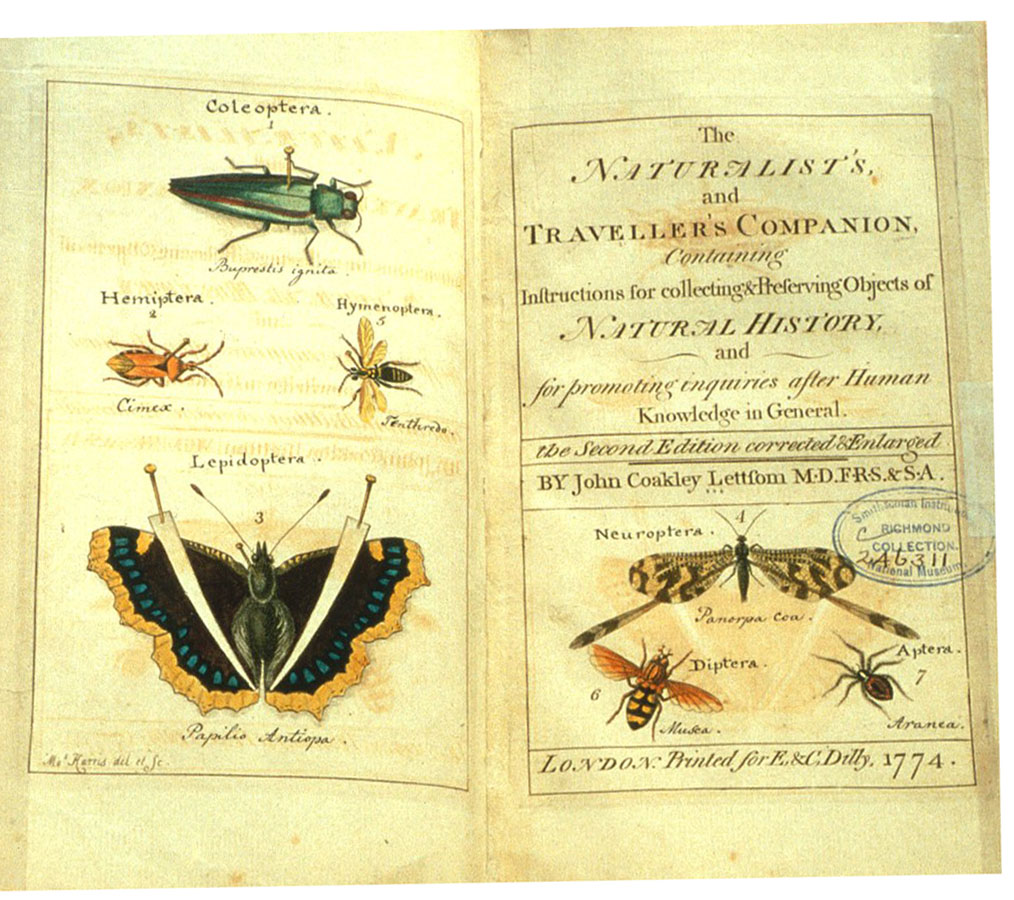
The naturalist's and traveller's companion, 1774

Lettsom was an entomologist. He wrote The naturalist's and traveller's companion, containing instructions for collecting and preserving objects of natural history and for promoting inquiries after human knowledge in general. London: E. and C. Dilly (1774).

== Family ==
On 31 July 1770 he married Anne Miers and they had several children; his extended family included William Garrow Lettsom, Sir Henry Miers Elliot, John Elliot and William Garrow.

== See also ==
- William Cullen
