= Medical Society of London =

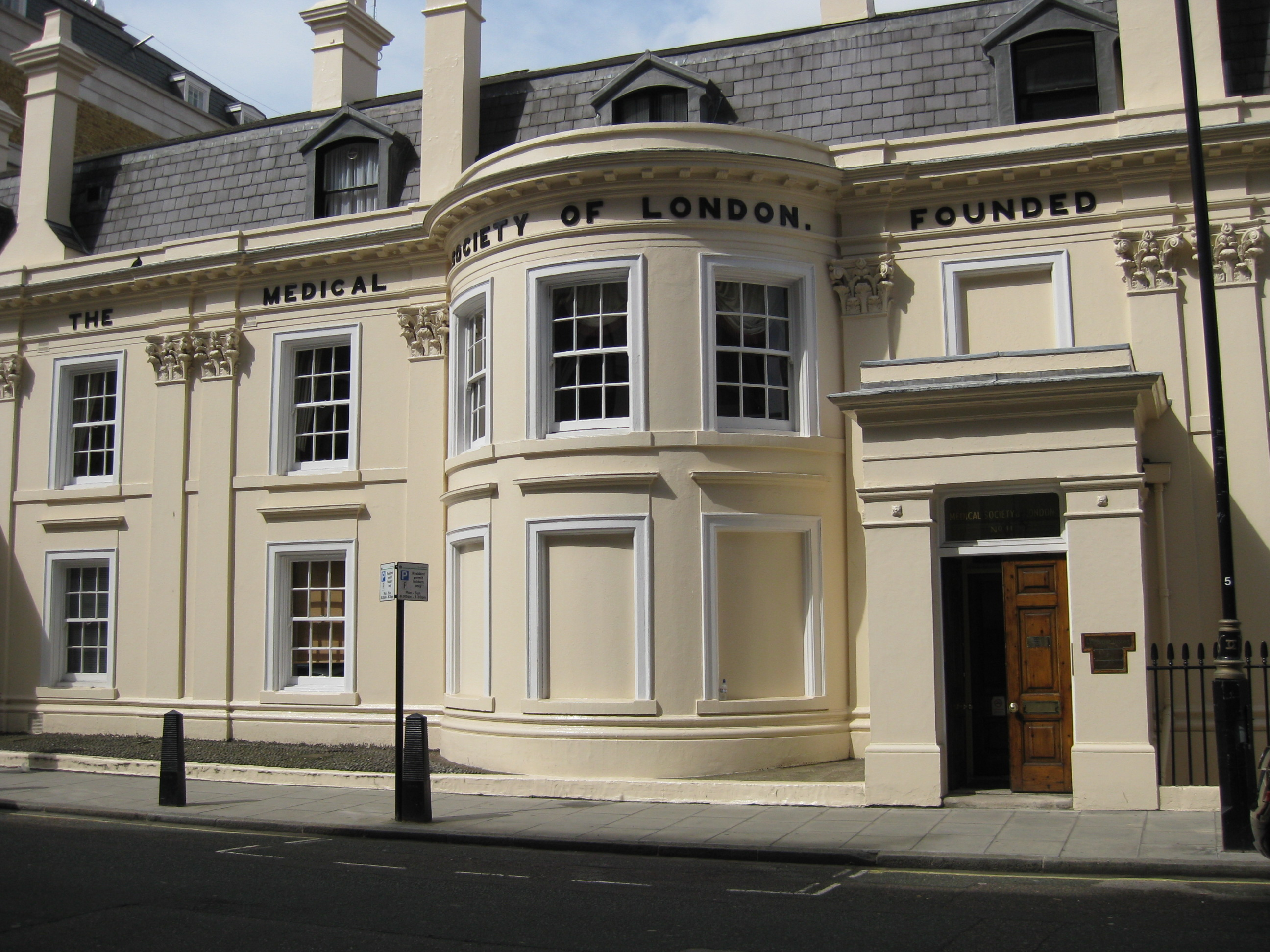
- Lettsom House, London
- Formation: 1773

The Medical Society of London is one of the oldest surviving medical societies (being organisations of voluntary association, rather than regulation or training) in the United Kingdom.

== History ==
It was founded in 1773 by the Quaker physician and philanthropist John Coakley Lettsom for physicians, surgeons and apothecaries, who met to exchange medical news and confer about difficult cases. Lettsom served as president of the new society in 1775–1776, 1784–1785, 1809–1811 and 1813–1815.

James Sims was president from 1786 to 1808, and during his long term of office some members of the society, led by William Saunders, became so offended by his autocratic style that in 1805 26 of them formed themselves into a new medical society, the Medical and Chirurgical Society of London, which later merged with other medical specialist societies to form the Royal Society of Medicine.

The Society's wide appeal in the 18th century, the possession of a valuable library (originally purchased from Sims) and freehold property (donated by Lettsom) helped to ensure the society's success at that time. Originally based in the City of London, it moved in 1873 to its present location in Lettsom House, Chandos Street, near Cavendish Square in the heart of London's medical community. This early 19th-century building was originally owned by the Earl of Gainsborough, and is now also home to several related societies who share the facilities. The library has since been purchased by the Wellcome Trust.

== Lectures and awards ==
The Lettsomian lecture is delivered annually by a fellow of the society.

The Fothergillian gold medal, named in honour of physician John Fothergill, Lettsom's patron, is awarded every three years in consultation with the Royal College of Physicians (to be awarded every five years from 2010). The present prize, founded in 1824, is funded by the will of Anthony Fothergill and prior to 1888 was awarded annually. The original award, sponsored by Lettsom, was introduced in 1787 and awarded until 1803.

=== Fothergill gold medal winners ===
Source: Source (1787–1902):

- 2022 Dame Sarah Gilbert for developing the COVID-19 Vaccine
- 2012 John McGrath
- 2004 Sir Ravinder N. Maini
- 2001 John E. Sulston
- 1998 Richard Peto and Rory Collins
- 1995 Sir David Weatherall
- 1983 Sheila Sherlock
- 1980 Sir Francis Avery Jones
- 1977 Cyril Astley Clarke
- 1974 Henry Hubert Grayson Eastcott
- Sir William Stewart Duke-Elder for his Textbook of Ophthalmology
- 1965 Sir Peter Medawar
- 1956 Robert "Robin" Daniel Lawrence
- 1953 Russell Brock
- 1947 Sir John Parkinson
- 1941 Sir Thomas Peel Dunhill
- 1938 Sir Henry Hallett Dale
- 1935 George Newman
- 1929 Sir Thomas Lewis
- 1917 Sir Leonard Rogers for his work on dysenteries, their differentiation and treatment.
- 1914 John George Adami
- 1911 Sir Frederick Walker Mott
- 1908 Almroth Wright
- 1905 Sir Frederick Treves, 1st Baronet, for his work in connection with abdominal surgery
- 1902 Sir Patrick Manson, "in recognition of the value of his work on Malaria and Tropical Diseases"
- 1899 Sydney Arthur Monckton Copeman
- 1896 Sir Victor Horsley, Functions of the Thyroid Gland and its Applications to Treatment
- 1893 William Richard Gowers
- 1888 Hobart Amory Hare (USA), The Pathology, Clinical History and Diagnosis of affections of the mediastinum other than those of the heart and aorta
- 1886 John Strahan, The Varieties and Complications of Thyphoid Fever
- 1883 Norman Porritt
- 1882 Thomas Michael Dolan, Whooping-cough; its Pathology and Treatment
- 1878 John Milner Fothergill, The Antagonism of Therapeutic Agents
- 1877 Peter Murray Braidwood
- 1873 John Kent Spender, Therapeutic Means for the Relief of Pain
- 1872 Edwards Crisp, On Croup
- 1870 Sir Thomas Smith Clouston, Use of Medication in the Treatment of Insanity
- 1868 John Clay
- 1859 Thomas Houghton Waters
- 1858 Thomas Herbert Barker, On Malaria and Miasmata
- 1857 Edwin Canton
- 1856 William Burke Ryan
- 1854 Benjamin Ward Richardson, The Diseases of the Child before Birth
- 1853 Sir Alfred Poland, Injuries and Wounds of the Abdomen
- 1852 Frederick William Headland, Action of Medicines in the System
- 1851 Richard Hodges, Haemorrhage
- 1850 Richard Payne Cotton, On Consumption: its Nature, Symptoms and Treatment
- 1849 John Millican
- 1847 Silas Stedman
- 1846 Robert Mortimer Glover, On the Pathology and Treatment of Scrofula
- 1845 Walter Cooper Dendy
- 1844 Henry Pratt Robarts
- 1843 John Weaver Lever, On the Symptoms and Treatment of Organic Diseases of the Uterus
- 1842 James Risdon Bennett, Acute Hydrocephalus
- 1840 Samuel Osborn
- 1838 George Pilcher, Structure and Pathology of the Ear
- 1836 Thomas Egerton Bryant, Diseases of the Larynx and Trachea
- 1835 George Moore, On Pathology, Causes and Treatment of Puerperal Fever
- 1834 William James Clement, Nature and Treatment of Diseases of the Urethra
- 1831 William Augustus Guy, on Asthma
- 1828 John George Parry
- 1824 Robert William Bampfield, Curvatures and Diseases of the Spine
- 1804–23 No award
- 1803 Edward Jenner
- 1802 No award
- 1801 Francis Bouttatz, "for his work on the Medicinal Effects of Phosphorus"
- 1795 John Mason Good, On Medical Technology
- 1792–94 No award
- 1791 John Lettsom, Diseases of Great Towns and the Best Means of Preventing them
- 1790 Robert Willan, On Skin Diseases
- 1788–1789 No award
- 1787 William Falconer, On the Influence of the Passions on Disorders of the Body (first award)

== Presidents ==
After the somewhat autocratic 22-year presidency of James Sims, a motion was passed in 1805 that: "No gentlemen be eligible to the office of President or Vice-president for more than two years in succession." The presidents are listed below with their year of election to the position.

- Source (1773–1902):
- 2024 Sue West
- 2023 Alistair Purves
- 2022 Colonel S Jagdish
- 2021 Professor Clara Lowy
- 2020 Brigadier I T Houghton
- 2019 Dafydd Thomas
- 2018 David Park
- 2017 David Shanson
- 2016 Christopher Lund
- 2015 Michael O'Brien
- 2014 Nicholas Cambridge
- 2013 Peter Keir
- 2012 Roy Palmer
- 2011 Stuart Blackie
- 2010 Margaret Spittle
- 2009 Lt-Gen Louis Lillywhite
- 2008 K M N Kunzru
- 2007 Anthony Kenney
- 2006 Audrey Tucker
- 2005 Michael Pugh
- 2004 Anne Riches
- 2003 Martin Seifert
- 2002 Peter Mitchell-Heggs
- 2001 Timothy Ffytche
- 2000 Richard Lancaster
- 1999 Royden Davies
- 1998 Patricia Last
- 1997 D Garfield Davies
- 1996 Andrew Keat
- 1995 Harvey White
- 1994 C D M Drew
- 1993 Elliot Philipp
- 1992 Major General N G Kirby
- 1991 Professor Paul Turner
- 1990 R P Rosswick
- 1989 J T Scott
- 1988 Raymond Kirk
- 1987 Peter Maxwell Daniel
- 1986 John Fernley Newcombe
- 1985 Surgeon Vice-Admiral Sir John Harrison
- 1984 Ian P. Todd
- 1983 Frank Clifford Rose
- 1982 Sir Reginald Murley
- 1981 Ewart M. Jepson
- 1980 Sir James Watt
- 1977 Sir Francis Avery-Jones
- 1975 Alan Woodruff
- 1974 David Geraint James
- 1973 John Hunt, Baron Hunt of Fawley
- 1967 Sir Robert Drew
- 1964 Guy Blackburn
- 19?? Arthur Henry Douthwaite
- 19?? Edward Grainger Muir
- 1958 Russell Brock, Baron Brock
- 1958 Sir Cecil Wakeley
- 1956 Douglas Guthrie
- 1950 Arthur Henry Douthwaite
- 1947 William Edward Tanner
- 1943 George Grey Turner
- 1941 Sir Gordon Gordon-Taylor
- 1939 Sir Vincent Zachary Cope
- 1938 Charles Ernest Lakin
- 19nn Robert Arthur Young
- 1934 George Grey Turner
- 1933 Sir John William Thomson-Walker
- 1931 Herbert Tilley
- 1928 John Walter Carr
- 1927 Herbert William Carson
- 1926 Sir Humphry Rolleston, Bt
- 1925 Sir Holburt Jacob Waring
- 1923 Charles J. Bond
- 1921 James Berry
- 1920 Sir William Hale-White
- 1917 Sir St Clair Thomson
- 1916 D'Arcy Power
- 1914 Sir John Bland-Sutton
- 1913 Sir David Ferrier
- 1909 Samuel West
- 1907 Sir James Kingston Fowler
- 1906 Sir Charles Alfred Ballance
- 1904 Sir Humphry Rolleston
- 1902 Alfred Pearce Gould
- 1901 William Henry Allchin
- 1900 John H. Morgan
- 1899 Frederick T. Roberts
- 1898 Edmund Owen
- 1897 Arthur Ernest Sansom
- 1896 Reginald Harrison
- 1895 Sir James Crichton-Browne
- 1894 Sir William B. Dalby
- 1893 John Syer Bristowe
- 1892 Sir Jonathan Hutchinson
- 1891 Richard Douglas Powell
- 1890 John Knowsley Thornton
- 1889 Charles Theodore Williams
- 1888 Sir William MacCormac
- 1887 John Hughlings Jackson
- 1886 Robert Brudenell Carter
- 1885 William M. Ord
- 1884 Arthur Edward Durham
- 1883 Sir Joseph Fayrer
- 1882 Francis Mason
- 1881 William Henry Broadbent
- 1880 Frederick James Gant
- 1879 John Cockle
- 1878 Erasmus Wilson
- 1877 George Buchanan
- 1876 William Adams
- 1875 Charles H. F. Routh
- 1874 Victor de Méric
- 1873 Samuel Osborne Habershon
- 1872 Thomas Bryant
- 1871 Sir Andrew Clark
- 1870 John Gay
- 1869 Peter Marshall
- 1868 Sir Benjamin Ward Richardson
- 1867 Henry Smith
- 1866 Charles John Hare
- 1865 Isaac Baker Brown
- 1864 Robert Greenhalgh
- 1863 Edwin Canton
- 1862 Francis Sibson
- 1861 William Coulson
- 1860 Sir Alfred Baring Garrod
- 1859 John Hilton
- 1858 William Hughes Willshire
- 1857 Francis Hird
- 1856 William Dingle Chowne
- 1855 John Snow
- 1854 Edward Headland
- 1852 John Bishop
- 1851 Edward W. Murphy
- 1850 J. Risdon Bennett
- 1848 Henry Hancock
- 1846 Walter Cooper Dendy
- 1844 Theophilus Thompson
- 1842 George Pilcher
- 1840 Henry Clutterbuck
- 1839 Leonard Stewart
- 1837 Thomas Egerton Bryant
- 1835 John Whiting
- 1833 William Kingdon
- 1831 John Burne
- 1829 Thomas Calloway
- 1827 John Haslam
- 1825 Henry Clutterbuck
- 1823 William Shearman
- 1821 David Unwins
- 1819 Henry Clutterbuck
- 1817 Thomas Waishman
- 1815 Joseph Adams
- 1813 John Lettsom
- 1811 George Pinckard
- 1808 John Lettsom
- 1786 John Relph / James Sims
- 1784 John Whitehead (expelled) / John Lettsom
- 1783 John Sims
- 1780 Samuel Foart Simmons (resigned)
- 1779 George Edwards
- 1776 Nathaniel Hulme
- 1775 John Lettsom
- 1773 John Millar (first president, resigned)
