= Filming at University College London =

Filming periodically takes place at University College London. The university tends to be chosen as a location for film and television recording because of its convenient position within London and the historical character of the UCL Main Building and Front Quad. Film and TV appearances include:

== Film ==
- Doctor in the House (1954) uses the Front Quad and Portico as the entrance to "St Swithin's Hospital".
- The 39 Steps (1959) uses the Front Quad and Wilkins Building as the "St John's Wood Hospital".
- Raising the Wind (1961) uses the Front Quad and Portico as the exterior of the "London Academy of Music and the Arts" ("LAMA").
- The Lost Language of the Cranes (1991) featured a fictional member of the staff at UCL and a few scenes were filmed in UCL.
- Eyes Wide Shut (1999) uses the UCL GP practice as the clinic for Tom Cruise's character.
- Gladiator (2000) uses the Front Quad as one of its models for ancient Rome.
- The Mummy Returns (2001) uses parts of UCL (mainly the Front Quad) to masquerade as the British Museum.
- Thunderbirds (2004) uses the Front Quad and Wilkins Building as the "Bank of London", sited on the north side of Trafalgar Square looking down Whitehall. In reality this site is occupied by the National Gallery, also designed by William Wilkins.
- Batman Begins (2005) features the DMS Watson library as "Gotham Print Room" and the exterior of the Medawar building as part of the police department headquarters; this film also uses the National Institute for Medical Research (as Arkham Asylum), and the cloisters of Senate House. The Thomas Lewis room in the Rockefeller Building was the setting for the courtroom scene.
- Starter for 10 (2006) uses the Front Quad, Gustave Tuck Lecture Theatre, parts of the Main Library and other areas of campus to masquerade as Bristol University.
- Atonement (2007) uses the Physics Yard for shots of the casualty clearing area.
- Jhoom Barabar Jhoom (2007 Bollywood film): the stairs up to the portico are used for the title song.
- The Dark Knight (2008): some scenes were filmed in and around UCL.
- Inception (2010): scenes were shot in the Front Quad, the Gustave Tuck Lecture Theatre and the Main Library.
- Desi Boyz (2011): uses the Portico steps and Front Quad.
- University of the Dead (2013): uses the Portico steps, Front Quad and other locations around campus including Jeremy Bentham's auto-icon.
- Our Kind of Traitor (2016): The Gustave Tuck Lecture Theatre is used as the setting for a lecture on poetry.
- The Current War (2017): uses the Portico as the entrance to the New York Stock Exchange.

== TV (fiction) ==
- The Sooty Show was filmed around UCL in the episode "Hot Air Balloon".
- Never the Twain uses the Front Quad as "Lord Smallbridge's House".
- Minder uses the Front Quad in episode "Sorry Pal, Wrong Number" (Season 4, 1984)
- Agatha Christie's Poirot, 9th series, "5 Little Pigs" episode, filmed in the old Main Library entrance and the Front Quad. Also uses the nearby British Museum Reading Room and Room 10. In addition, "Four and twenty blackbirds" was filmed in the Donaldson Reading Room of the Main Library, and the episode "Hickory Dickory Dock" features both the Cruciform Building and Front Quad.
- Spooks (Series III, episode II) features the Front Quad and the Gustave Tuck Lecture Theatre.
- BBC Four's 2005 remake of The Quatermass Experiment uses the part of Gower Street which runs past various laboratories in the scene where Carroon breaks into a chemistry laboratory. The original 1953 version had been rehearsed at the Student Movement House on the same street.
- The opening of The Complete Guide to Parenting (2006) uses scenes shot in UCL's Front Quad. Some scenes from certain episodes were also filmed here.
- Britz, a serial made by Channel 4 (2007) uses many parts of UCL: the Main Library, and parts of the Cloisters are used for cadaver dissection rooms.
- Burn Up (BBC 2008) - uses the Portico and Front Quad as the High Court of Justice.
- Silent Witness uses the Front Quad (carefully avoiding the Observatories), the main gate, North and South Cloisters, as well as the Octagon. Other locations used in the area include the ULU and Senate House buildings.
- Law and Order: UK (ITV) - the 2011 series was filmed around the Main Building, featuring the Front Quad, Portico and cloisters among others.
- Giri/Haji - the 2019 series features numerous scenes filmed at UCL throughout, in and around the Bloomsbury campus, including the Front Quad, Campbell House and Taviton Street, and the Darwin Lecture Theatre.

== TV (Non-fiction) ==
James May with students outside the CAVE

- Derren Brown: The Heist, shown on Channel 4 in January 2006, featured brief exterior shots of the Front Quad and University Street.
- James May filmed part of an episode of James May's Big Ideas around UCL and inside the CAVE in Malet Place Engineering Building in February 2008.

== Advert recordings ==
- Kit Kat filmed an advert featuring pop group Girls Aloud for the Kit Kat Senses bar in the evening of Tuesday 18 into the early morning of Wednesday 19 March 2008. The presence of Girls Aloud attracted much attention from the press, the paparazzi and bloggers and the filming was discussed on UCL's student radio station, Rare FM, by DJs presenting at the time.

== DVD recordings ==
The Bloomsbury Theatre has been used as the venue for DVD recordings of stand-up comedians' tours.

- Former UCL student Ricky Gervais recorded Ricky Gervais Live: Animals for DVD in the Bloomsbury Theatre in 2003.
- Jimmy Carr recorded Jimmy Carr: Live in 2004, Jimmy Carr: Stand Up in 2005 and Jimmy Carr: Comedian in 2007 for DVD in the Bloomsbury Theatre.
- Harry Hill's recorded Harry Hill in Hooves for DVD in the Bloomsbury Theatre in 2005.
- Lee Mack recorded Lee Mack: Live for DVD in the Bloomsbury Theatre in 2006.
- Caroline Reid played Pam Ann in a DVD recording of her show Come Fly With Me performed in the Bloomsbury Theatre in September 2007.

Musicians The Zombies recorded The Zombies Live At The Bloomsbury Theatre, London for CD and DVD in the Bloomsbury Theatre in 2006.

== Student media ==
UCL Union's societies, including the UCLU Film & TV Society and the UCLU Drama Society, often film in and around UCL.
