= Jodrell Professor of Zoology and Comparative Anatomy =

The Jodrell Professor of Zoology and Comparative Anatomy is a chair at University College London, endowed (shortly after the Jodrell Chair of Physiology) by TJ Phillips Jodrell in 1874.

UCL was the first university in England to have a Chair of Zoology, and the first holder was Robert Edmond Grant after which the post received the Jodrell endowment. Until 1948, the professor of Zoology was also Curator of the Grant Museum of Zoology, after this point the two roles were separated.

Jodrell was a 'wealthy eccentric' who went insane before his gift could be completed, requiring the 'Masters in Lunacy' to confirm the donation.

== Professor of Zoology and Comparative Anatomy ==
1827-1874 Robert Edmond Grant

== Jodrell Professors of Zoology and Comparative Anatomy ==
- 1874-1889 Sir Ray Lankester
- 1889-1899 Raphael Weldon
- 1899-1906 Edward Alfred Minchin
- 1906-21 James Peter Hill
- 1921-51 D. M. S. Watson
- 1951-62 Sir Peter Medawar
- 1962-70 Michael Abercrombie
- 1970-91 Avrion Mitchison
- 1994-98 Jeff Williams
- 2019-present Max J Telford
