= Jodrell Chair of Physiology =

Chair of physiology at UCL

The Jodrell Chair of Physiology is a chair at University College London, endowed (shortly before the Jodrell Professor of Zoology and Comparative Anatomy) by Thomas Jodrell Phillips Jodrell in 1873. The chairs succeeded the previous chair in Anatomy and Physiology.

The endowment was for the sum of £7500 (equivalent to £833,253 in 2025), with a further £500 for equipment. This endowment was acknowledged in the final report of the Royal Commission on Scientific Instruction in 1875.

The first holder was John Burdon-Sanderson after the post received the Jodrell endowment.

Two Jodrell Professors, Archibald Hill and Andrew Huxley, have gone on to win the Nobel Prize in Physiology or Medicine

== Professors of Anatomy and Physiology ==
- 1831-1836 Jones Quain
- 1836-1874 William Sharpey

== Jodrell Professors of Physiology ==
- 1874-1882 Sir John Burdon Sanderson
- 1883-1899 Edward Sharpey-Schafer
- 1899-1923 Ernest Starling
- 1923-1925 Archibald Hill
- 1926-1949 Charles Lovatt Evans
- 1949-1960 Sir Lindor Brown
- 1960-1969 Sir Andrew Huxley
- 1969-1979 Douglas Wilkie
- 1979-1995 Timothy Biscoe
- 1995- David Attwell

== Bibliography ==
- Harte, Negley B.; North, John; Brewis, Georgina (2018). The world of UCL (Revised and updated [fourth] ed.). London: UCL Press. doi:10.2307/j.ctv1xz0vg.8. ISBN 9781787352933.
- O'Connor, W.J. (1991). British Physiologists 1885-1914: A Biographical Dictionary. Manchester University Press. ISBN 9780719032820.
