= Salt baronets =

Set index for Salt baronets

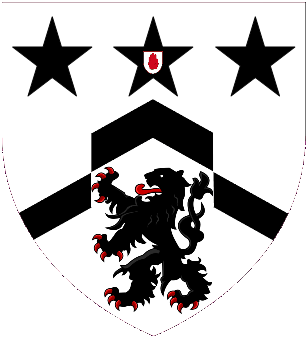
shield of arms

There have been two baronetcies created for persons with the surname Salt, both in the Baronetage of the United Kingdom. As of 2026 both titles are extant.

- Salt baronets of Saltaire (1869)
- Salt baronets of Standon and Weeping Cross (1899)
