= Kathleen Lonsdale Building =

Building in London, England

General information
- Type: University
- Architectural style: Neoclassical
- Location: London, England
- Coordinates: 51°31′31″N 0°08′04″W
- Completed: 1913

Design and construction
- Architect: Frederick Moore Simpson

Listed Building – Grade II
- Official name: University College Chemistry Laboratory and Attached Railings and Wall
- Designated: 14 May 1974
- Reference no.: 1322169

The Kathleen Lonsdale Building is a Grade II listed building in the Bloomsbury district of London. Named for crystallographer Kathleen Lonsdale, it was built to house the chemistry department of University College London.

== History ==
From 1907, plans were introduced for the reorganisation of UCL's estate. The chemistry department spread across several buildings at the time, and under its head William Ramsay, there was impetus to consolidate the department. Initial proposals involved relocating to different areas of the campus. Eventually however, with consideration for the expansion of the campus, land on Gower Place was acquired from Maple & Co., with donations from livery companies, businesses and individuals raised from 1910. Public interest was boosted with the nomination of Prince Arthur of Connaught to the post of president of the committee for the raising of funds. Architect Frederick Moore Simpson who had been consulting on the project from around its inception began drawing up a design for the building.

Building work was carried out from 1912, with the exterior broadly completed by 1913. Delays caused by the First World War meant the building first opened in 1916, occupied for the rest of the war by the Ministry of Munitions, with laboratories used by the Anti-Gas Deparmen, Aeronautical Inspection Department and Munitions Inventions Department until 1919. The building suffered bomb damage during the Second World War from a strike on 10 May 1941.

Later additions include a roof extension in 1938. Conversion work in 1985 by Stillman & Eastwick-Field saw a new top floor. The building was refurbished by John Graham Construction between 2015 and 2018 when it was reopened by Sir David Attenborough.

== Design ==
The building is Neoclassical in design, reflecting much of the rest of the campus, particularly the Main Building. Its frontage on Gower Place is a wide symmetrical Portland stone facade topped with a mansard roof and dormers. The central portico is bounded by Corinthian columns in antis.

== See also ==
- UCL Main Building
- Cruciform Building
