= Rockefeller Building, London =

Building of University College London

Rockefeller Building
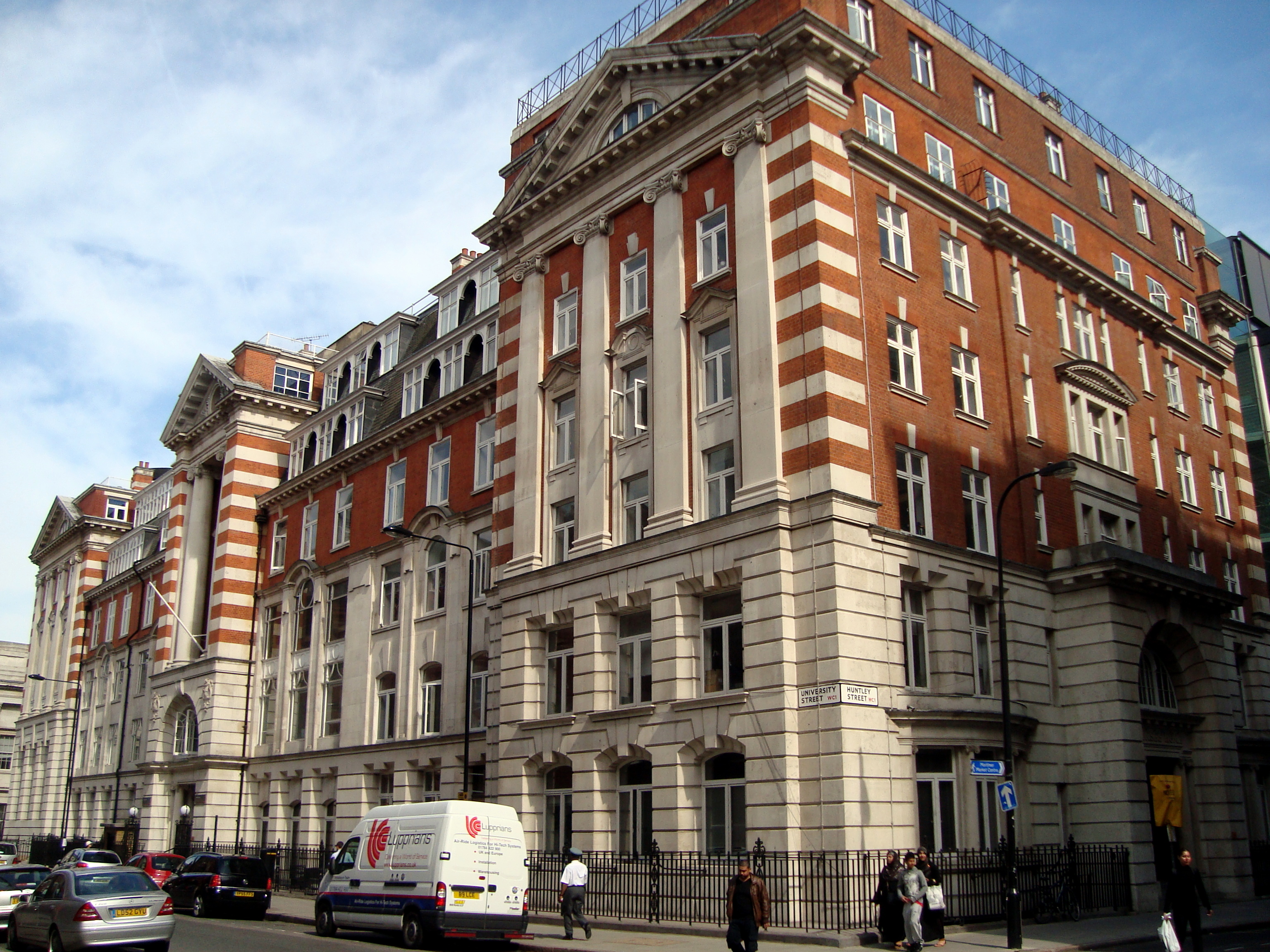

General information
- Type: University
- Architectural style: Edwardian Baroque
- Location: London, England
- Coordinates: 51°31′25″N 0°08′05″W
- Completed: 1907

Design and construction
- Architect: Paul Waterhouse

Listed Building – Grade II
- Official name: University College Hospital Medical School, Nurses Home 1907 Building and Attached Railings
- Designated: 21 November 1990
- Reference no.: 1113060

The Rockefeller Building is a Grade II listed building in the Bloomsbury district of London. It was built to house the University College Hospital Medical School as well as the nurses' home and obstetric staff residence.

== History ==
Plans were first formulated in 1902 as a home for the University College Hospital Medical School, due to a planned separation of University College Hospital and University College London. While carried out, the schools were reintegrated in 1980. Donald Currie granted significant monetary contribution to the building of the medical school with an offer of £100,000 towards construction. Currie laid the foundation stone in 1906 and the school was opened by 1907.

The Cruciform Building opposite was built as a new building for the hospital around the same time as the Medical School Building. It was completed by Paul Waterhouse, son of its architect Alfred Waterhouse, and architect of the Rockefeller Building.

In the 1920s, the Rockefeller Foundation made donations of £835,000 to University College Hospital and £370,000 to University College London itself, financing among other things significant extensions to the Rockefeller Building, for which it came to be known by its current name.

Currently, the occupants of the building are the Grant Museum of Zoology, Faculty of Medical Sciences, Division of Biosciences, and the Elizabeth Garrett Anderson Institute of Women’s Health.

== Design ==
The building is of an Edwardian Baroque design, the main facade facing the Cruciform Building across University Street. It is a tall red-brick and Portland stone frontage described by Nikolaus Pevsner as "ridiculously grand". The grand exterior was partly seen as fitting for the substantial donation of Currie its main benefactor, but also responded to the challenges posed by the nature of the Occupants. The multiple purposes of the buildings, including both large laboratories, as well as more modest domestic accommodation meant it was easier to hide the varying sized rooms and floors behind an imposing facade.

== See also ==
- UCL Main Building
- Cruciform Building
