= Thomas Jodrell Phillips Jodrell =

English barrister, land-owner and philanthropist (1807–1889)

- Born: Thomas Jodrell Phillips; October 4, 1807; Manchester
- Died: September 3, 1889 (aged 81); Bristol
- Education: Macclesfield
- Alma mater: Trinity College, Cambridge
- Occupation: Barrister
- Known for: Philanthropy
- Parents: Shakespear Phillips (father); Harriet Jodrell (mother)

Thomas Jodrell Phillips Jodrell (4 October 1807 – 3 September 1889) was a nineteenth-century barrister, land-owner and philanthropist.

== Family ==
Thomas Jodrell Phillips was born 4 October 1807 in Manchester, and was baptised at St Peter's Church (since demolished) on 9 November. (Note: Although Alumni Cantabrigienses states his date of birth as being 4 October 1807, it may also be interpreted that he was aged 18 when admitted a pensioner at Trinity College on 25 September 1822, implying a birth date in 1804. The baptismal record and other sources support the former date.) His father, Shakespear Philips (1772–1855), of Barlow Hall, Lancashire, was a land-owner. His mother, Harriet (1780–1844), was the daughter of John Bower Jodrell, of Yeardsley, Cheshire, and Shallcross, Derbyshire.

He had three siblings that survived beyond infancy. His elder brother, Harry Shakespear Phillips, born 1805, pursued a military career, mostly with the 53rd Foot where two of his maternal uncles had served. Harry joined as an officer on a purchased commission achieving the rank of Lieutenant Colonel and was made Companion of the Order of the Bath. He saw action at Aliwal and Sobraon in 1846. Their eldest sister, Hannah Sophia, born 1802, married Revd. Henry Tomkinson in 1823 and whose eldest daughter, Sophia Ann, became the wife of George Cotton. The youngest sister, Frances Maria, did not marry.

== Education ==
After attending school in Macclesfield he entered Trinity College, Cambridge in 1825 aged 18 and became a Scholar in 1827. In the summer of that year he spent the holidays in the Lake District as part of party from Cambridge with friends Charles Wordsworth and William Tyrrell. He continued his studies becoming B.A. (12th Wrangler and 2nd Classic) 1829. He was made a Fellow of Trinity in 1830, awarded M.A in 1832 and called to the bar in the Inner Temple on 20 November 1835.

He appears to have become a member of the Athenaeum Club before being called to the bar and retained membership for many years thereafter. He is recorded as one of the initial supporters of the formation of the Statistical Society in 1833, chaired by Robert Malthus, and gave the Athenaeum Club as his address.

== Legal career ==
In both the 1841 and 1851 census he was resident in chambers in New Square, London, adjacent to Lincoln's Inn Fields, (Note: This predated construction of the nearby Royal Courts of Justice building in the 1870s.) in the parish of Saint Clement Danes, London, along with many neighbouring barristers and, on both occasions, dwelling with Henry Edgar Austen, a nephew of Jane Austen. During this period he wrote Reports of cases argued and determined in the High court of chancery during the time of Lord Chancellor Lyndhurst : with a few during the time of Lord Chancellor Cottenham, volume 47 of English Reports. Whilst a practising barrister, his interests were clearly broader than those of his immediate profession and drew on his time at Trinity. In July 1848 he was one of 224 alumni of Oxford and Cambridge Universities, all signatories of a letter to Lord John Russell, then Prime Minister, requesting he advise Queen Victoria to "...issue Her Royal Commission of Inquiry into the best methods of securing the improvement of the Universities of Oxford and Cambridge". (Note: Other notable signatories of the 1848 letter to Lord John Russell included: Thomas Agar-Robartes, 1st Baron Robartes; Baden Powell; Charles Darwin; Erasmus Alvey Darwin; Thomas Henry Farrer, 1st Baron Farrer; Edmund Walker Head, eighth baronet; James Heywood; John Stevens Henslow; Edward Horsman; Joseph Kay; Peter John Locke King; Charles Lyell; George Nugent-Grenville, 2nd Baron Nugent; Bonamy Price; Nassau William Senior; Hensleigh Wedgwood; Sir Harry Verney, 2nd Baronet; and Henry Galgacus Redhead Yorke;) Royal commissions on Oxford and Cambridge Universities were subsequently established in 1850 and reported in 1852.

== Inheritances and philanthropy ==
His brother, Harry Shakespear, died in 1849, unmarried and without issue, about the same time as having sold out of his commission and retired. Their father, Shakespear Phillips, died in 1855 and Thomas therefore inherited much of his estate.

By the 1861 census, living in High Street, Cotterstock, unmarried and with a domestic staff of six, he described himself as a "Landed proprietor and fundholder".

His maternal uncles all died without issue and thus on 4 June 1868, at the age of 61, Thomas became the main beneficiary of the Jodrell estate. In accordance with the conditions of the will, Thomas assumed the surname and arms of Jodrell, by Royal Licence, on 29 June 1868. His legal experience was brought to bear as he established his right to the income from the sale of timber from his newly acquired estates in Cheshire and Derbyshire against apportionment to other beneficiaries of the will. According to the 1883 edition of The Great Landowners of Great Britain and Ireland his estates measured 3,130 acres (1,270 ha) in Cheshire and 575 acres (233 ha) in Derbyshire and were valued at £3,339 (equivalent to £351,020 in 2025).

Thereafter he appears to have become more involved in matters of social importance and, on occasions, providing funding to support his favoured causes. In 1872 he wrote to the governors of St George's Hospital, giving, at length and in detail his views on healthcare provision for the poor and those more able to pay something towards related costs. His address is given as 13 Stratton Street in Mayfair. By 1874, he was a subscriber and member of the council of the early Charity Organisation Society, serving as an 'additional member' rather than as a representative of a London district and frequently attended their weekly meetings. He was also a subscriber to, and lifetime governor of, the Metropolitan Free Hospital and wrote letters to the Pall Mall Gazette and Daily News in remonstrance at the dismissal of Dr. John Chapman for publicly criticising inadequate out-patient facilities there.

He was one of the subscribers to the refurbishment and redecoration of Trinity College Chapel, Cambridge that took place between 1871 and 1875. One of the chapel windows is attributed to him and the eight figures depicted include saints Thomas and Philip.

The Royal Commission on Scientific Instruction was established in 1870 and published eight successive reports from 1871 through to 1875. Phillips Jodrell appears to have been influenced by its emerging recommendations. In 1874 he granted an endowment of £7500 (equivalent to £833,253 in 2025) to University College, London to fund a Professorship of Science, with a further £500 for equipment. (Note: The endowment was recorded in 1875 as having a value of $36,700 in dollar bonds.) This endowment was acknowledged in the final report of the commission. A succession of academics have since held the title Jodrell Professor of Physiology and Jodrell Professor of Zoology and Comparative Anatomy.

In 1874, the Royal Commission's fourth report noted the problems encountered in funding botanical physiological studies at the Royal Botanic Gardens, Kew raised by the garden's director Joseph Dalton Hooker and recommended:

VIII. That opportunities for the pursuit of Investigations in Physiological Botany should be afforded in the Royal Gardens at Kew.

In the absence of public funding, Phillips Jodrell, described as "a personal friend" of Hooker, subsequently funded the construction and establishment of a scientific laboratory at the gardens with a donation of £1,500 (equivalent to £149,645 in 2025), reported in 1875. Phillips Jodrell expressed reservations about funding a facility where there was no clear support for paying its staff and, despite Hooker's assurance that he might use it himself, there is no evidence that he actually did. Payment was made in two equal instalments in no immediate hurry. Construction of a dedicated building was completed in 1876 and was subsequently named the Jodrell Laboratory in his honour. The centenary of the laboratory's foundation was marked by the naming of a genus within the Liliaceae as Jodrellia.

In February 1876, in a letter to Hooker written from his Stratton Street address, he also gave £6000 (equivalent to £682,105 in 2025) to the Royal Society to provide support funding for individual researchers to be awarded at the Society's discretion. The Royal Commission on Scientific Instruction eventually led to government funding for scientific research but Phillips Jodrell gave instructions for the Society to retain the funds and, in the event of his death, to put them towards a long-term support fund - which is what happened.

== Later years, death and succession ==
In December 1876, he resigned his position on the council of the Charity Organisation Society "...on account of increasing ill-health". In April 1877 the novelist Henry James, then aged 34, wrote to his sister, Alice, and described a dinner engagement with the 70-year-old Phillips Jodrell at his Stratton Street home, overlooking the garden of Devonshire House. James stated:

He is an old bachelor of fortune & culture a liberal, charitable, a retired fox hunter, a valetudinarian, & friend of many Americans of 40 years ago. He is very fond of giving small dinners, talking of old books etc. & is a very pretty specimen of a fresh-colored, blue-eyed simple-minded yet cultivated (two things which go together so much here) old English gentleman.

Phillips Jodrell's concern for his own health and the term "simple-minded" may have been an early indication of deteriorating mental health for, by 1878, his second endowment to UCL for a professorship of Zoology, was referred to the Masters in Lunacy for oversight.

In 1887, a 21-year lease of coal seams within his lands in and near his native Yeardsley refers to him as resident at The Priory, Roehampton and being of "unsound mind". His affairs were administered by his nephew, Henry Richard Tomkinson. He died in Blagdon near Bristol on 3 September 1889. Probate was conducted 14 December 1889 and his personal estate valued at £265,593 (equivalent to £29,507,481 in 2025). He was succeeded by his nephew, Henry Richard Tomkinson, who made a deed of gift to his nephew, Edward Cotton-Jodrell, the only son of his sister, Sophia Ann.
