= F. M. Simpson =

English architect

Frederick Moore Simpson
- Born: 25 November 1855; Hackney, London, England
- Died: 13 June 1928 (aged 72); Danehill, East Sussex, England
- Occupation: Architect

Frederick Moore Simpson FRIBA (25 November 1855 – 13 June 1928) was an English architect, architectural historian and professor.

== Early life ==
Simpson was born in Hackney in 1855. He was articled to George Frederick Bodley between 1876 and 1880, and subsequently attended the Royal Academy Schools. He worked under Edward Robert Robson and Charles John Ferguson before starting his own practice in 1885, living in Dean's Yard.

== Career ==
In 1890 he was elected an associate of the Royal Institue of British Architects and in 1902 a fellow. He held positions as Professor of Architecture at both the University of Liverpool from 1894 to 1903 and afterwards the University of London from 1903 to 1919, succeeded in Liverpool by C. H. Reilly. He also produced a number of buildings for University College London including the Kathleen Lonsdale Building. Among his most significant works are the Queen Victoria Monument in Liverpool, and his published work A History of Architectural Development (1905).
