= Edward Alfred Minchin =

British biologist (1866–1915)

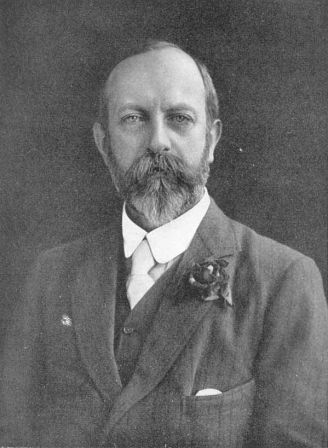
- Born: 26 February 1866; Weston-super-Mare
- Died: 30 September 1915 (aged 49); Selsey
- Education: Keble College, Oxford
- Known for: Porifera Trypanosomes
- Spouse: Florence Maude Fontain (m. 1903)
- Scientific career
- Fields: Zoology; Protozoology; Parasitology; Parasitology; Microscopy
- Workplaces: Oxford University; University College London

Edward Alfred Minchin FRS FLS FZS (26 February 1866 – 30 September 1915) was a British zoologist who specialised in the study of sponges and Protozoa. He became Jodrell Chair of Zoology at University College London in 1899, Chair of Protozoology at the University of London in 1906, and was elected a Fellow of the Royal Society in 1911.

== Early life and education ==
Edward Alfred Minchin was born in Weston-super-Mare on 26 February 1866 to Charles N. Minchin and Mary J. Lugard. He was educated at the United Services College, Westward Ho!, and the Bishop Cotton Boys School, Bangalore, India. Minchin graduated from Keble College, Oxford in 1890 with first class honours in zoology, and three years later was elected Fellow of Merton College.

== Career ==
After graduating Minchin was awarded first the University Scholarship, and then the Radcliffe Travelling Fellowship which enabled him to travel through Europe. He worked at several different institutions including the Stazione Zoologica in Naples, Observatoire océanologique de Banyuls-sur-Mer and Station biologique de Roscoff in France, and in the laboratories of Otto Bütschli and Richard Hertwig in Germany. On his return to Oxford he worked as demonstrator in comparative anatomy for Ray Lankester from 1890 to 1899. He was also appointed lecturer of biology at Guy's Hospital from 1898 to 1899.

In 1899 he succeeded Raphael Weldon as Jodrell Professor of Zoology and Comparative Anatomy, and curator of what is now the Grant Museum of Zoology at University College London (UCL). While Professor of Zoology at UCL Minchin worked on sponges, especially the development of spicules in calcareous sponges. He was the first to conclusively prove that sponges are not part of the Coelenterata.

Lankester had long lobbied for a permanent Chair of Protozoology at the University of London and in 1906 the position was finally created, associated with the Lister Institute of Preventive Medicine. Minchin was appointed to the job which he continued to hold until his death in 1915. He was succeeded as the Jodrell Chair of Zoology and Comparative Anatomy by James Peter Hill. While working at the Lister Institute Minchin's research focus moved to parasitic protozoa, especially trypanosomes. In 1905 he visited Uganda to study sleeping sickness, and went on to study trypanosomes in humans and other animals including rats and birds.

During his career he published around 40 papers, his first was on the stink glands of cockroaches, and was published in 1888 while he was still an undergraduate. fMinchin wrote seven articles for the 1911 edition of Encyclopædia Britannica including the entry for Protozoa. In 1912 he published a general textbook entitled An Introduction to the Study of Protozoa. Minchin also contributed chapters to Lankester's Treatise on Zoology, for Volume I Introduction and Protozoa, and Volume II Porifera and Coelenterata published between 1900 and 1909.

Minchin was encouraged to stand for election to the Royal Society by E Ray Lankester, who championed his work on tsetse flies to support the application. As well as becoming a Fellow of the Royal Society, Minchin was involved with several other learned societies, he was President of the Quekett Microscopical Club from 1908 to 1912, Vice-president of the Zoological Society of London and Zoological Secretary of the Linnean Society. He won the Linnean Society's Trail Award in 1910.

== Death and legacy ==
Minchin had always suffered from ill health. He died from tubercular pleurisy on 30 September 1915, aged 49. In his obituaries Minchin was praised for the quality of his work, the depth of his knowledge, and was described as the first great British protozoologist.

== Published works ==
- Note on a New Organ, and on the Structure of the Hypodermis, in Periplaneta orientalis Journal of Cell Science 1888 s2-29: 229–234; http://jcs.biologists.org/content/s2-29/115/229
- Note on a Sieve-like Membrane across the Oscula of a Species of Leucosolenia, with some Observations on the Histology of the Sponge Journal of Cell Science 1892 s2-33: 251–272; http://jcs.biologists.org/content/s2-33/130/251
- The Oscula and Anatomy of Leucosolenia clathrus, O. S Journal of Cell Science 1892 s2-33: 477–495; http://jcs.biologists.org/content/s2-33/132/477
- Observations on the Gregarines of Holothurians Journal of Cell Science 1893 s2-34: 279–310; http://jcs.biologists.org/content/s2-34/135/279
- On the origin of the triradiate spicules of Leucosolenia, Proceedings of the Royal Society of London 1895 Vol. 58 204–205
- Note on the larva and the postlarval development of Leucosolenia variabilis, H. sp., with remarks on the development of other asconidæ, Proceedings of the Royal Society of London 1897, Vol. 60, 45–52
- Materials for a Monograph of the Ascons.--I. On the Origin and Growth of the Triradiate and Quadriradiate Spicules in the Family Clathrinidæ Journal of Cell Science 1898 s2-40: 469–587; http://jcs.biologists.org/content/s2-40/160/469
- Volume I Introduction and Protozoa and Volume II Porifera and Coelenterata in A Treatise on Zoology, 1900–1909, E Ray Lankester
- Rhinosporidium kinealyi, n.g., n.sp., a new Sporozoön from the Mucous Membrane of the Septum Nasi of Man Journal of Cell Science 1905 s2-49: 521–532; http://jcs.biologists.org/content/s2-49/195/521
- Report on the anatomy of the tsetse-fly (Glossina palpalis), Proceedings of the Royal Society B 1905 Vol 76, issue 512
- Glossina palpalis in its relation to Trypanosoma gambiense and other trypanosomes (preliminary report), Proceedings of the Royal Society B 1906 Vol 78
- Investigations on the Development of Trypanosomes in Tsetse-Flies and other Diptera Journal of Cell Science 1908 s2-52: 159–260; http://jcs.biologists.org/content/s2-52/206/159
- Materials for a Monograph of the Ascons Journal of Cell Science 1908 s2-52: 301–355; http://jcs.biologists.org/content/s2-52/207/301
- The Structure of Trypanosoma lewisi in Relation to Microscopical Technique Journal of Cell Science 1909 s2-53: 755–808; http://jcs.biologists.org/content/s2-53/212/755
- Observations on certain Blood-parasities of Fishes occurring at Rovigno Journal of Cell Science 1910 s2-55: 113–154; http://jcs.biologists.org/content/s2-55/217/113
- The Division of the Collar-cell of Clathrine Coriacea (Montagu): A Contribution to the Theory of the Centrosome and Blepharoplast Journal of Cell Science 1910 s2-55: 611–640; http://jcs.biologists.org/content/s2-55/220/611
- Observations on the Trypanosome of the Little Owl (Athene Noctua), with Remark on the other Protozoan Blood-Parasites Occurring in this Bird Journal of Cell Science 1911 s2-57: 141–185; http://jcs.biologists.org/content/s2-57/226/141
- An introduction to the study of the Protozoa, with special reference to the parasitic forms 1912
- The Rat-Trypanosome, Trypanosoma Lewisi, in its Relation to the Rat-Flea, Ceratophyllus Fasciatus Journal of Cell Science 1915 s2-60: 463–681; http://jcs.biologists.org/content/s2-60/240/463
