= George Oliver (physician) =

English physician

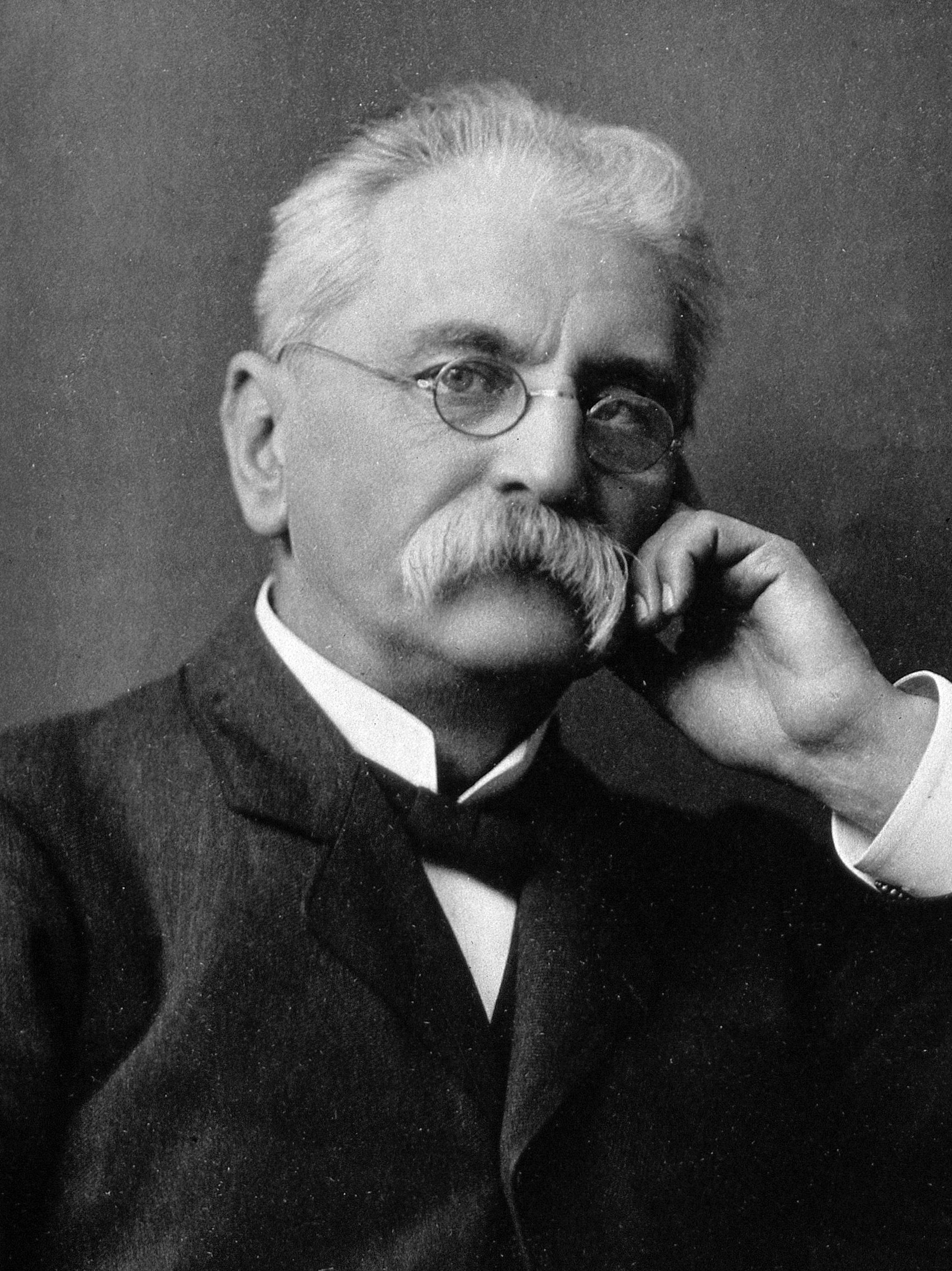
George Oliver

George Oliver (13 April 1841 – 27 December 1915) was an English physician.

He was born in Middleton-in-Teesdale, County Durham, the second son of W. Oliver, a surgeon. He attended the boarding school in Gainford, Yorkshire and was then medically educated at University College, London and University College Hospital, where he qualified MB in 1865 and MD in 1873.

== Background and training ==
He moved to Harrogate, Yorkshire and ran an extensive practice there from 1876 until his retirement in 1908. In 1887 he was elected a fellow of the Royal College of Physicians and in 1896 delivered their Croonian Lecture on the subject of the circulation of the blood. In 1904 he founded the Oliver-Sharpey lectureship to promote physiological research by observation and experiment, and to encourage the application of physiological knowledge to the prevention and cure of disease and the prolongation of life (The lectureship was founded in honor of William Sharpey, who was Oliver's physiology professor at University College, London.)

== Inventions and studies ==
Oliver invented several instruments such as the haemoglobinometer, haemodynamometer and arteriometer. These instruments allowed him in 1893 to observe the effect an extract of sheep's adrenal gland had on human blood vessels. He continued the study of the glands of internal secretion, especially the suprarenals, in conjunction with Professor Edward Schäfer at University College.

== Marriage ==
Oliver died in retirement in Farnham, Surrey. He was married twice: firstly in 1872 to Alice Mary Hunt, who died in 1898 and secondly in 1900 to Mary Ledgard, who survived him.
