= John Burdon-Sanderson =

English physiologist (1828–1905)

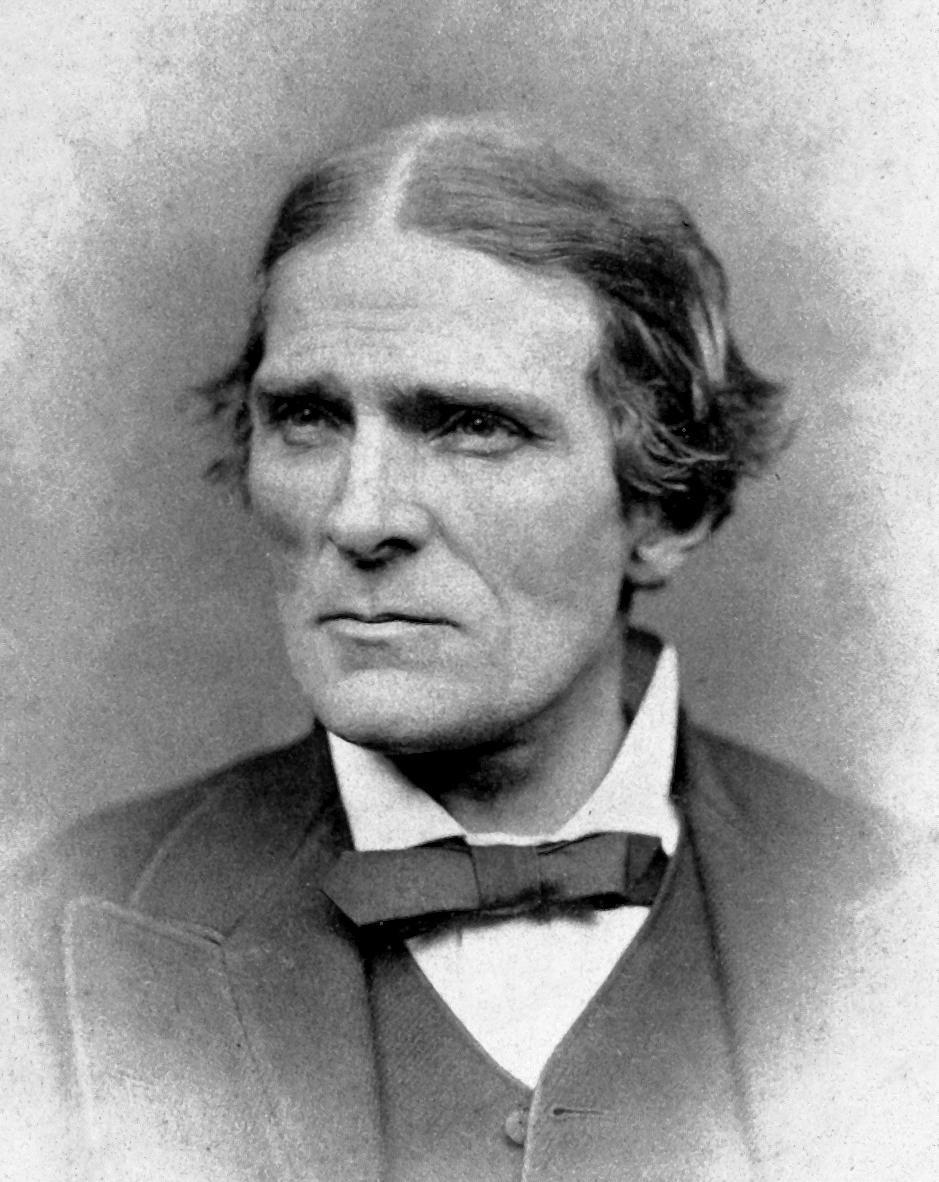
John Scott Burdon-Sanderson in 1870

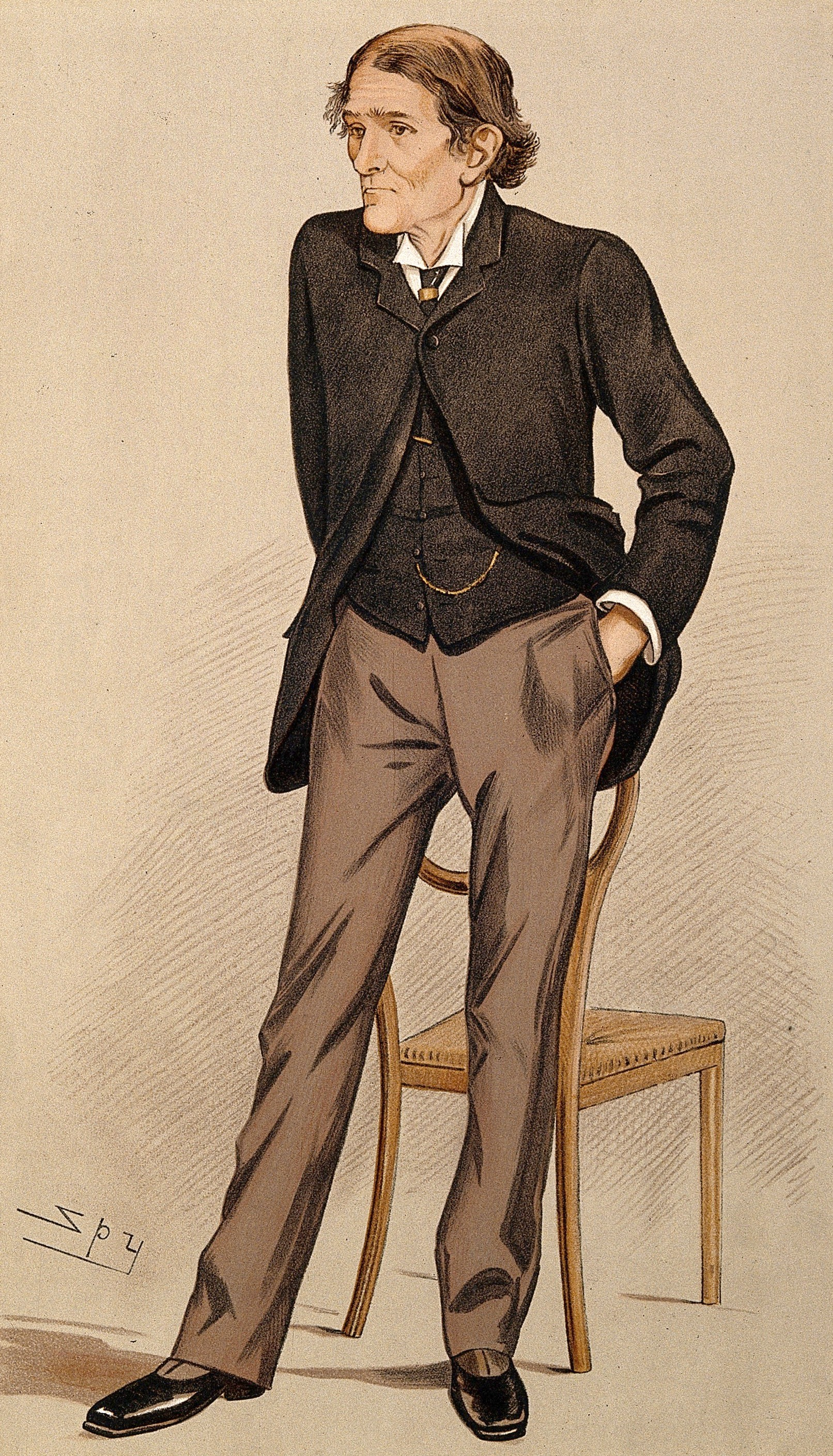
Dr. J Burdon-Sanderson: 1894 Vanity Fair caricature by Spy

Sir John Scott Burdon-Sanderson, 1st Baronet, FRS, HFRSE D.Sc. (21 December 1828 – 23 November 1905) was an English physiologist born near Newcastle upon Tyne, and a member of a well known Northumbrian family. Burdon-Sanderson was notable for forming a correct theory of contagion in 1866.

== Biography ==
He was born at Jesmond near Newcastle-upon-Tyne on 21 December 1828 the son of Richard Burdon (1791–1865) and his wife Elizabeth Sanderson. His maternal grandfather was Sir James Sanderson, 1st Baronet. His paternal grandfather was Sir Thomas Burdon.

He received his medical education at the University of Edinburgh with the thesis "On the metamorphoses of the coloured corpuscles in extravasated blood" and at Paris. Settling in London, he became Medical Officer of Health for Paddington in 1856 and four years later physician to the Middlesex Hospital and the Brompton Consumption hospitals.

When diphtheria appeared in England in 1858 he was sent to investigate the disease at the different points of outbreak, and in subsequent years he carried out a number of similar inquiries, e.g. into the cattle plague and into cholera in 1866. In 1871, he reported that Penicillium inhibited the growth of bacteria, an observation which places him among the forerunners of Alexander Fleming. He became first principal of the Brown Institution at Lambeth in 1871, and in 1874 was appointed Jodrell Professor of Physiology at University College London, retaining that post until 1882. When the Waynflete Chair of Physiology was established at Oxford in 1882, he was chosen to be its first occupant, and immediately found himself the object of a furious anti-vivisectionist agitation. The proposal that the university should spend a large amount of money providing him with a suitable laboratory, lecture rooms, etc., in which to carry on his work, was strongly opposed, by some on grounds of economy, but largely because he was an upholder of the usefulness and necessity of experiments upon animals. It was, however, eventually carried by a small majority (88 to 85), and in the same year the Royal Society awarded him a Royal Medal in recognition of his researches into the electrical phenomena exhibited by plants and the relations of minute organisms to disease, and of the services he had rendered to physiology and pathology. In 1885 the University of Oxford was asked to vote £500 a year for three years for the purposes of the laboratory, then approaching completion. This proposal was fought with the utmost bitterness by Sanderson's opponents, the anti-vivisectionists including E. A. Freeman, John Ruskin and Bishop Mackarness of Oxford. Ultimately the money was granted by 412 to 244 votes.

In 1895 Sanderson was appointed Regius Professor of Medicine at Oxford, resigning the post in 1904. On 10 August 1899 he was created a Baronet, of Banbury Road in the Parish of Saint Giles in the City of Oxford. His attainments, both in biology and medicine, brought him many honours. He was Croonian Lecturer to the Royal Society in 1867 and 1877 and to the Royal College of Physicians in 1891. He gave the Harveian Oration before the College of Physicians in 1878, acted as President of the British Association at Nottingham in 1893 and served on three Royal Commissions: on Hospitals (1883), on Tuberculosis, Meat and Milk (1890), and on a University for London (1892).

He was elected to honorary membership of the Manchester Literary and Philosophical Society, in 1892, and in February 1902 he received the honorary degree Doctor of Science (D.Sc.) from the Victoria University of Manchester, in connection with the 50th jubilee celebrations of the establishment of the university.

He died in Oxford on 23 November 1905. He is buried in Wolvercote Cemetery in Oxford.

== Family ==
In 1853 he married the author Ghetal Herschell, daughter of Ridley Haim Herschell. His wife wrote his biography. They had no children.

On 21 January 1876 his brother Richard, a JP, and Richard's two daughters, Elizabeth Haldane and Margaret Isabella, were casualties in the Abbots Ripton rail accident. The two young ladies were killed outright; Richard succumbed to his injuries three months later on 30 April 1876. They are interred in Huntingdon.

He was maternal uncle to the scientist John Scott Haldane.

== See also ==
- Discoveries of anti-bacterial effects of penicillium moulds before Fleming

== Notes and references ==
Baronetage of the United Kingdom
New creation	Baronet (of Banbury Road); 1899–1905	Extinct
Preceded by Salt baronets	Burdon-Sanderson baronets of Banbury Road; 10 August 1899	Succeeded by Usher baronets
