= Salt baronets of Standon and Weeping Cross (1899) =

Salt baronets
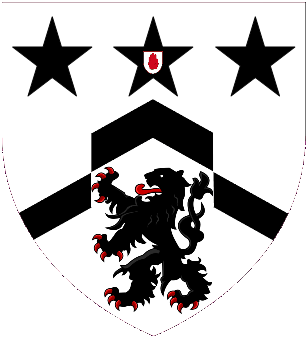
- Escutcheon of the Salt baronets of Standon and Weeping Cross
- Creation date: 1899
- Status: extant
- Motto: In Sale Salus, In salt is health
- Arms: Argent a chevron rompu between three mullets in chief and a lion rampant in base Sable.
- Crest: Three annulets interlaced Sable thereon a dove holding in the beak an olive branch Proper and charged on the neck with a chevron also Sable

The Salt baronetcy, of Standon and Weeping Cross in the County of Stafford, was created in the Baronetage of the United Kingdom on 8 August 1899 for the banker and politician Thomas Salt. He was Member of Parliament for Stafford for four periods between 1859 and 1892.

== Salt baronets, of Standon and Weeping Cross (1899) ==
- Sir Thomas Salt, 1st Baronet (1830–1904)
- Sir Thomas Anderdon Salt, 2nd Baronet (1863–1940), High Sheriff of Staffordshire in 1909.
- Sir Thomas Henry Salt, 3rd Baronet (1905–1965)
- Sir (Thomas) Michael John Salt, 4th Baronet (born 1946)

The heir presumptive is Anthony William David Salt (born 1950), brother of the 4th Baronet.

== Extended family ==
- William Salt (1808–1863), banker and genealogist, was the third son of John Stevenson Salt, grandfather of the 1st Baronet.
- Harold Francis Salt (1879–1971), seventh son of the 1st Baronet, was a major general in the Royal Artillery.
- James Frederick Thomas George Salt (1940–2009), son of George Stevenson Salt RN, second son of the 2nd Baronet, was a rear admiral in the Royal Navy.

== Notes ==
Baronetage of the United Kingdom}
Preceded by Hoare baronets	Salt baronets of Standon and Weeping Cross; 8 August 1899	Succeeded by Burdon-Sanderson baronets
