= Royal Commission on Scientific Instruction =

The Royal Commission on Scientific Instruction and the Advancement of Science or the Devonshire Report was a Royal Commission of the United Kingdom that sat from 1870 to 1875.

The Commission was appointed in May 1870 and was chaired by the Duke of Devonshire. It also included Lord Lansdowne, Sir John Lubbock, Sir James Kay-Shuttleworth, Bernhard Samuelson, William Sharpey, Thomas Henry Huxley (Professor of Natural History at the Royal School of Mines), William Allen Miller (Professor of Chemistry at King's College, London), and George Gabriel Stokes (Lucasian Professor of Mathematics at the University of Cambridge). Norman Lockyer served as Secretary to the Commission.

The Commission published its first report in 1871, a supplement and second report in 1872, and a third in 1873. In 1874 it published a fourth and fifth, then in 1875 its sixth and seventh and concluded with its eighth and final report.

The Commissioners reported in 1875 that "still no adequate effort has been made to supply the deficiency of Scientific Instruction pointed out by the Commissioners in 1861 and 1864. We are compelled, therefore, to record our opinion that the Present State of Scientific Instruction in our schools is extremely unsatisfactory".
