= Salt baronets of Saltaire (1869) =

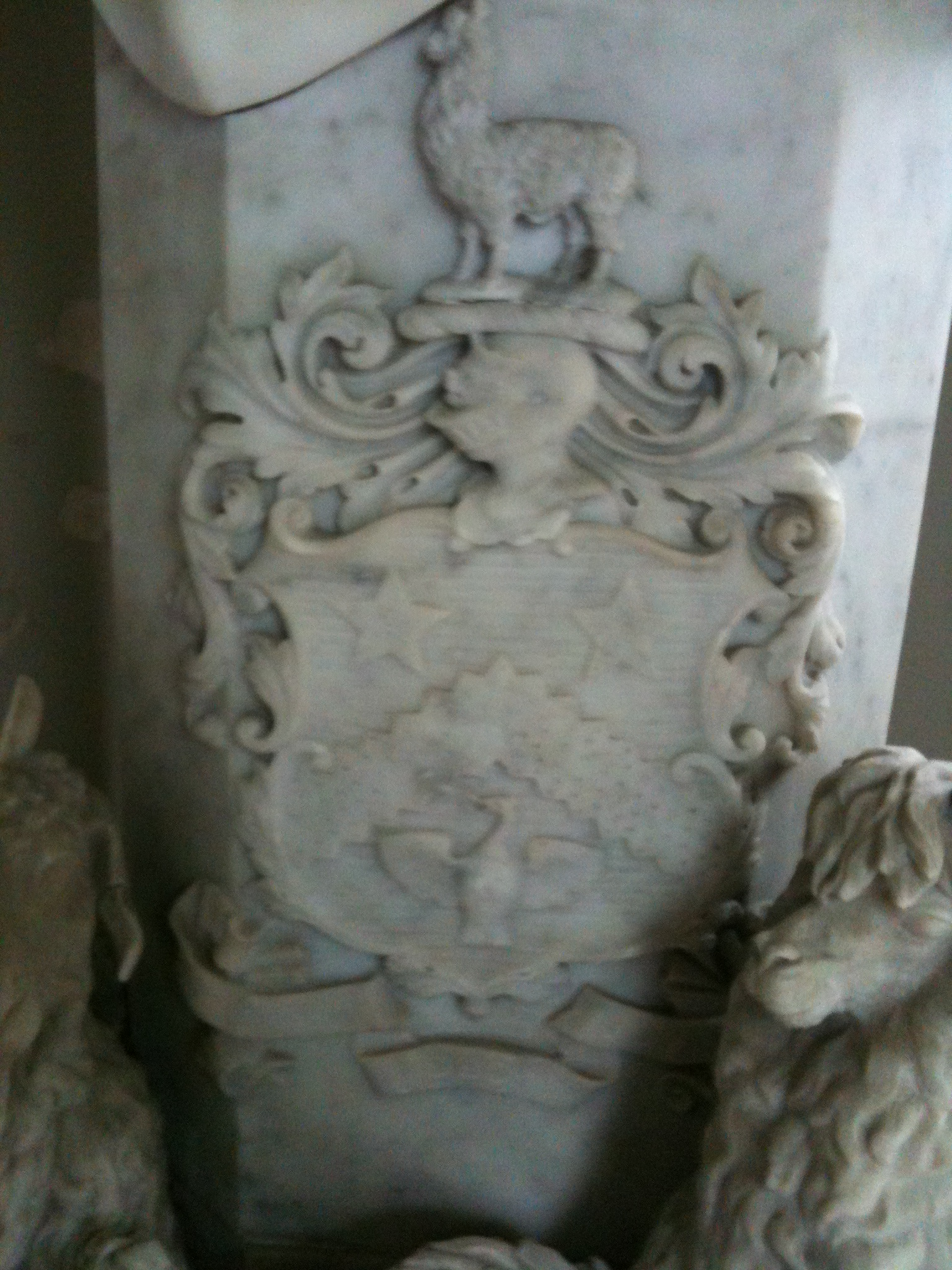
Coat of arms of Titus Salt

The Salt baronetcy, of Saltaire in the County of York, was created in the Baronetage of the United Kingdom on 30 October 1869 for the manufacturer, benefactor and politician Titus Salt. He was Mayor of Bradford for 1849 to 1850, and its Member of Parliament from 1859 to 1861, as a Liberal.

The Official Roll currently marks the title as "vacant".

== Salt baronets, of Saltaire (1869) ==
- Sir Titus Salt, 1st Baronet (1803–1876)
- Sir William Henry Salt, 2nd Baronet (1831–1892)
- Sir Shirley Harris Salt, 3rd Baronet (1857–1920)
- Sir John William Titus Salt, 4th Baronet (1884–1953)
- Sir David Shirley Salt, 5th Baronet (1930–1978)
- Sir Anthony Houlton Salt, 6th Baronet (1931–1991)
- Sir Patrick MacDonnell Salt, 7th Baronet (1932–June 2024)
- Daniel Alexander Salt, presumed 8th Baronet (1943–October 2024)
- Nicholas John Salt, presumed 9th Baronet (born 1945)

The heir apparent is the current presumed holder's son, Aaron Salt (born 1972).
