= Grant Museum of Zoology and Comparative Anatomy =

Natural history museum in London, England

Coordinates: 51°31′26″N 0°08′03″W

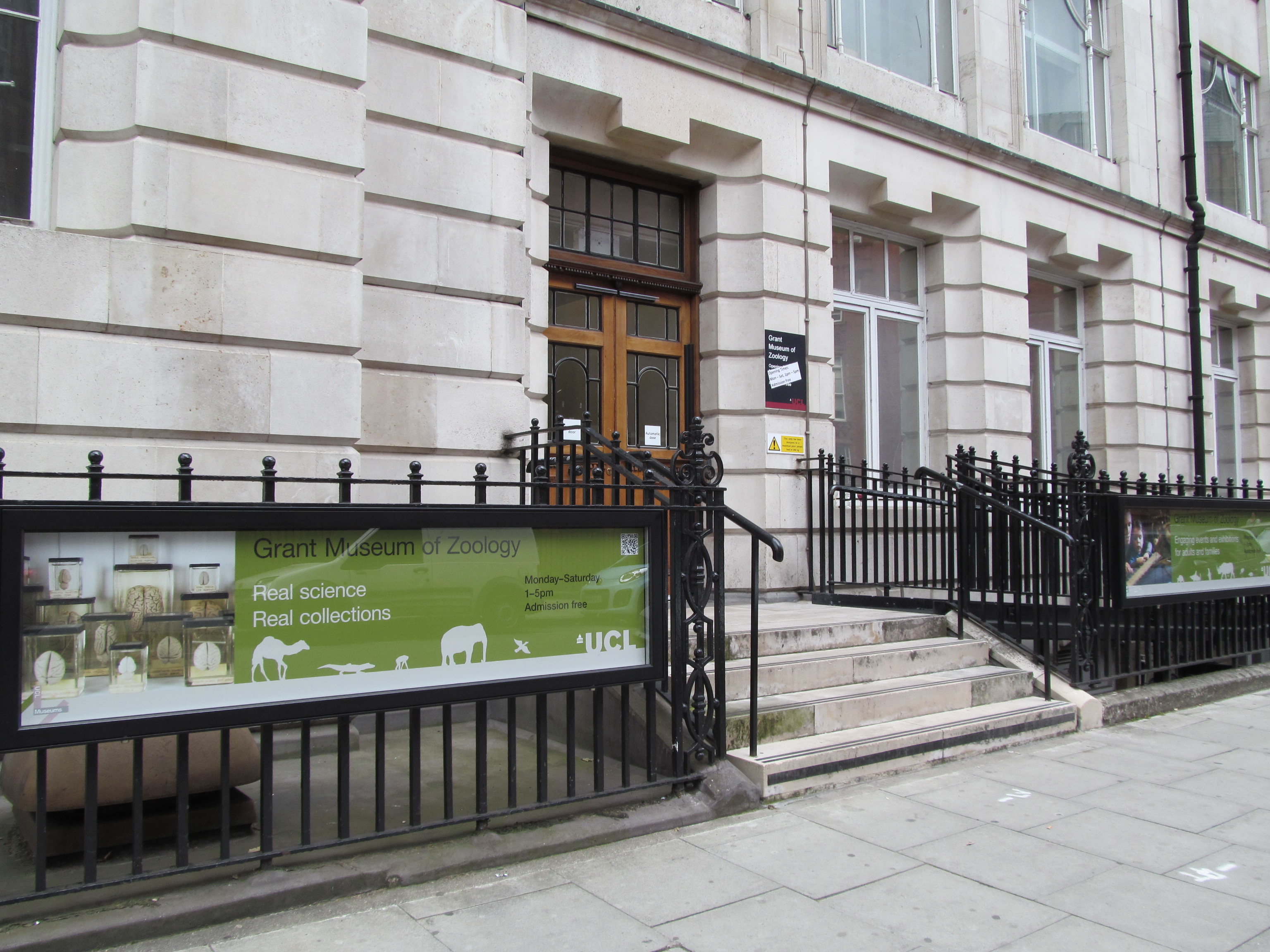
- The exterior of the Grant Museum

- Location within Central London
- Established: 1828; 198 years ago
- Location: University Street; London, WC1; United Kingdom
- Type: Natural history
- Public transit access: Euston Square; Warren Street; Euston
- Website: Grant Museum of Zoology

The Grant Museum of Zoology and Comparative Anatomy is a natural history museum that is part of University College London in London, England. It was established by Robert Edmond Grant in 1828 as a teaching collection of zoological specimens and material for dissection. It is one of the oldest natural history collections in the UK, and is the last remaining university natural history museum in London. Notable specimens and objects held by the museum include a rare quagga skeleton, thylacine specimens, dodo bones and Blaschka glass models.

== History ==
Robert Edmond Grant was the first Chair of Zoology in England, the founder of the Grant Museum collection and its first curator. He set the precedent that the Chair of Zoology at UCL (then the University of London) was also the curator of the comparative zoology collection. On his death Grant left his own collection to the museum, and was briefly succeeded by William Henry Allchin before care of the collection passed to invertebrate zoologist Edwin Ray Lankester in 1875. Lankester was curator until 1891 and added significantly to the museum collection. Later lecturer curators included evolutionary biologist W. F. R. Weldon, Edward Alfred Minchin, embryologist J. P. Hill and palaeontologist D. M. S. Watson. After 1948 the curatorship of the museum was no longer the responsibility of the Chair of Zoology and the museum was under the care of professional curators.

The Grant Museum has been in continuous use by students at UCL since 1828, and first opened to the public in 1996. In 2011, the museum moved from its previous location in the Darwin Building on the UCL campus to the Thomas Lewis Room in the Rockefeller Building, formerly the UCL Medical School library.

== Collections ==
The Grant Museum contains around 100,000 zoological specimens, many of which are very rare and several of which have been recently rediscovered. The collection contains specimens from a number of former university collections, including specimens from Imperial College London and Queen Mary University of London in addition to material from London Zoo and various London hospital comparative anatomy collections. The museum also contains specimens from the collections of Thomas Henry Huxley, Karl Pearson, Victor Negus and Doris Mackinnon, and material from the Discovery Expedition and Challenger Expedition.

== Gallery ==
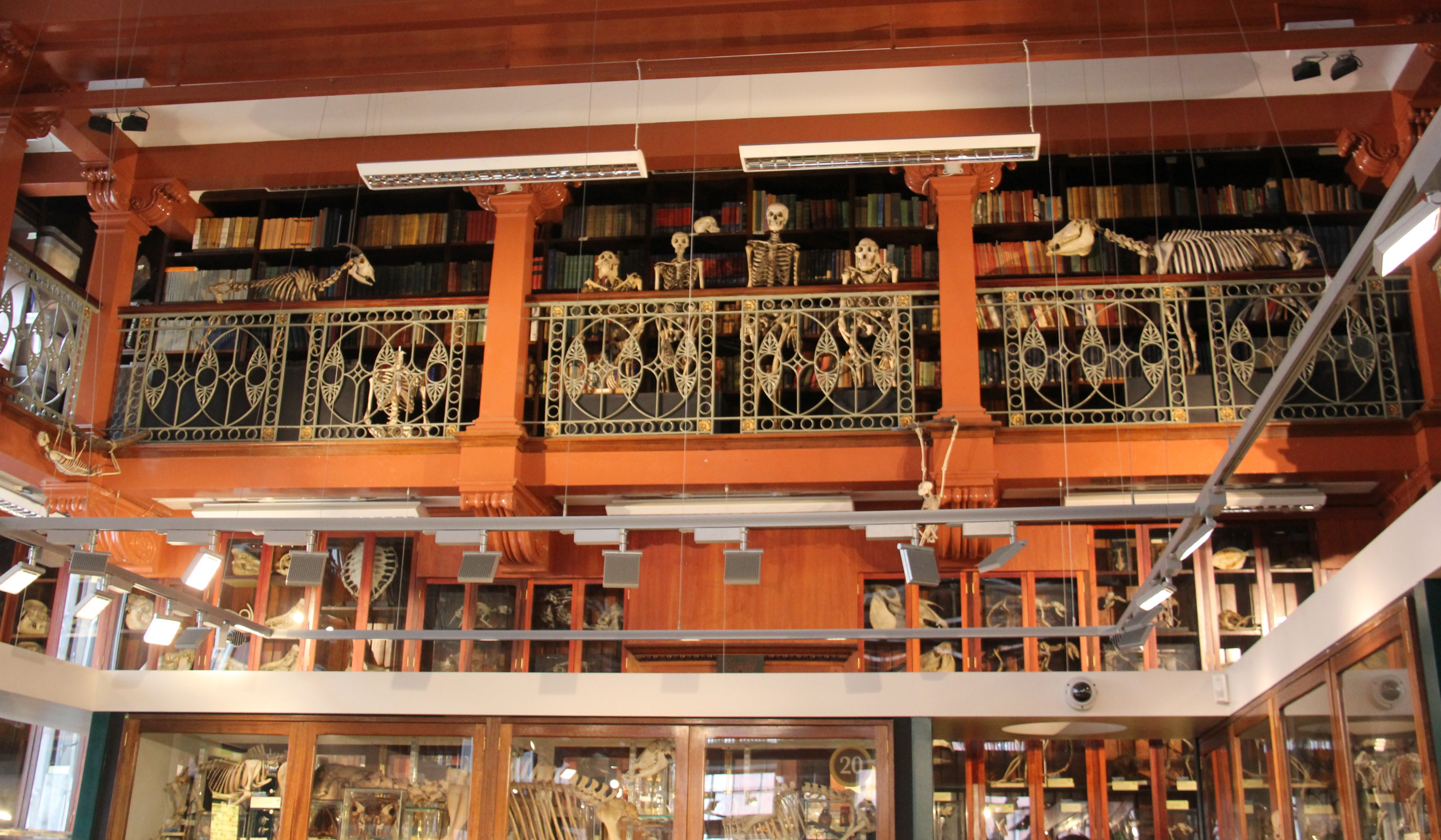
Display cases

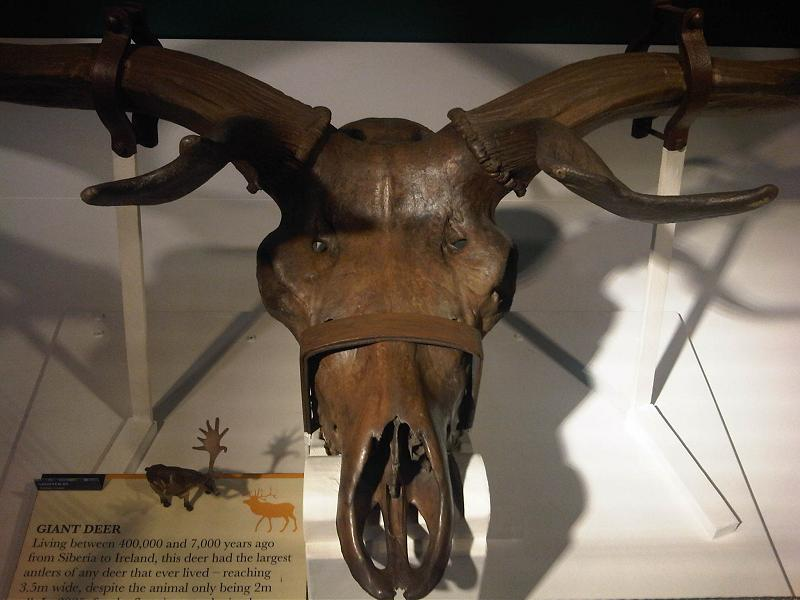
Megaloceros giganteus which was discovered hanging in an Irish hotel and then acquired by the museum

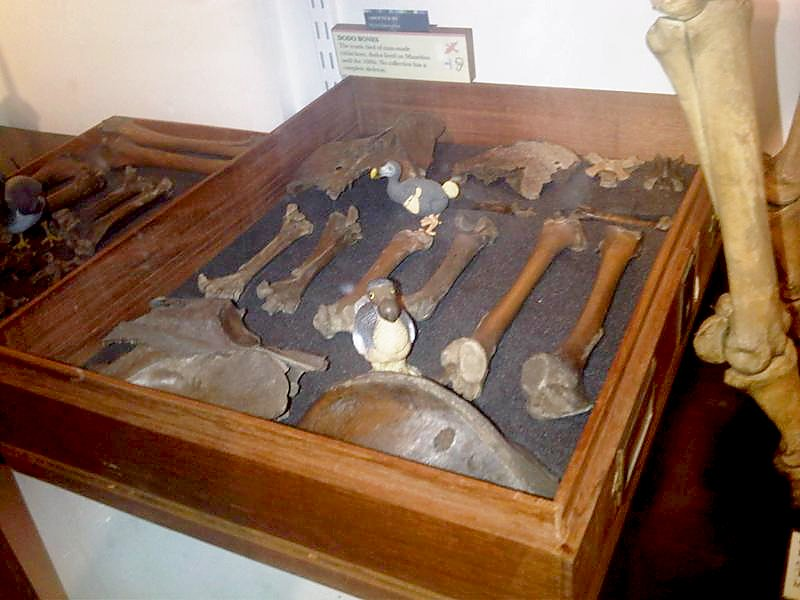
Dodo bones which had been stored away for a century until being rediscovered in 2011 while the collection was moved to a new building

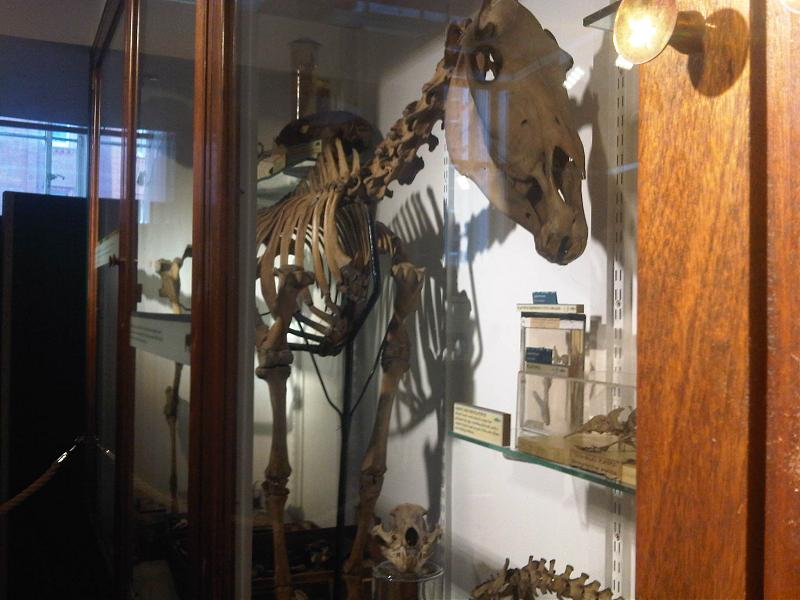
Quagga skeleton which was not identified as such until 1981

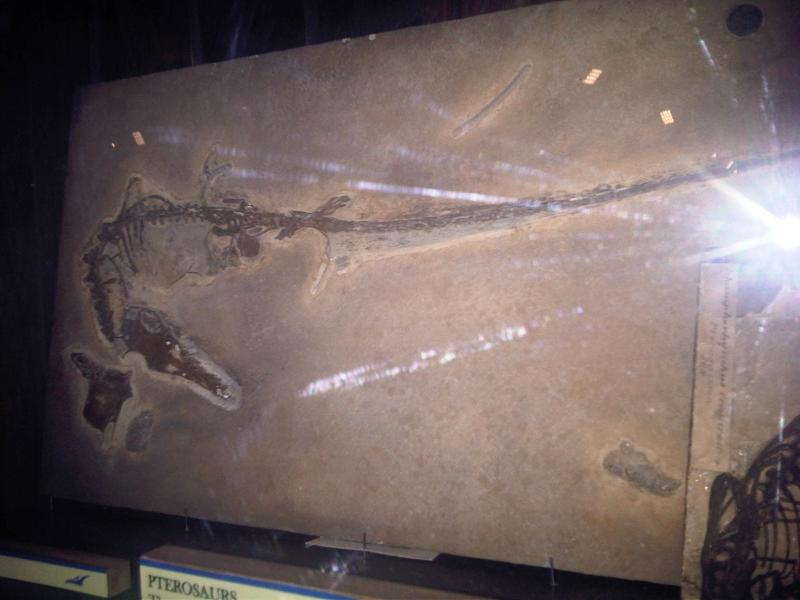
Rhamphorhynchus fossil which was assumed to be a plaster cast, but turned out to be a real fossil
