= James Peter Hill =

Scottish embryologist (1873–1954)

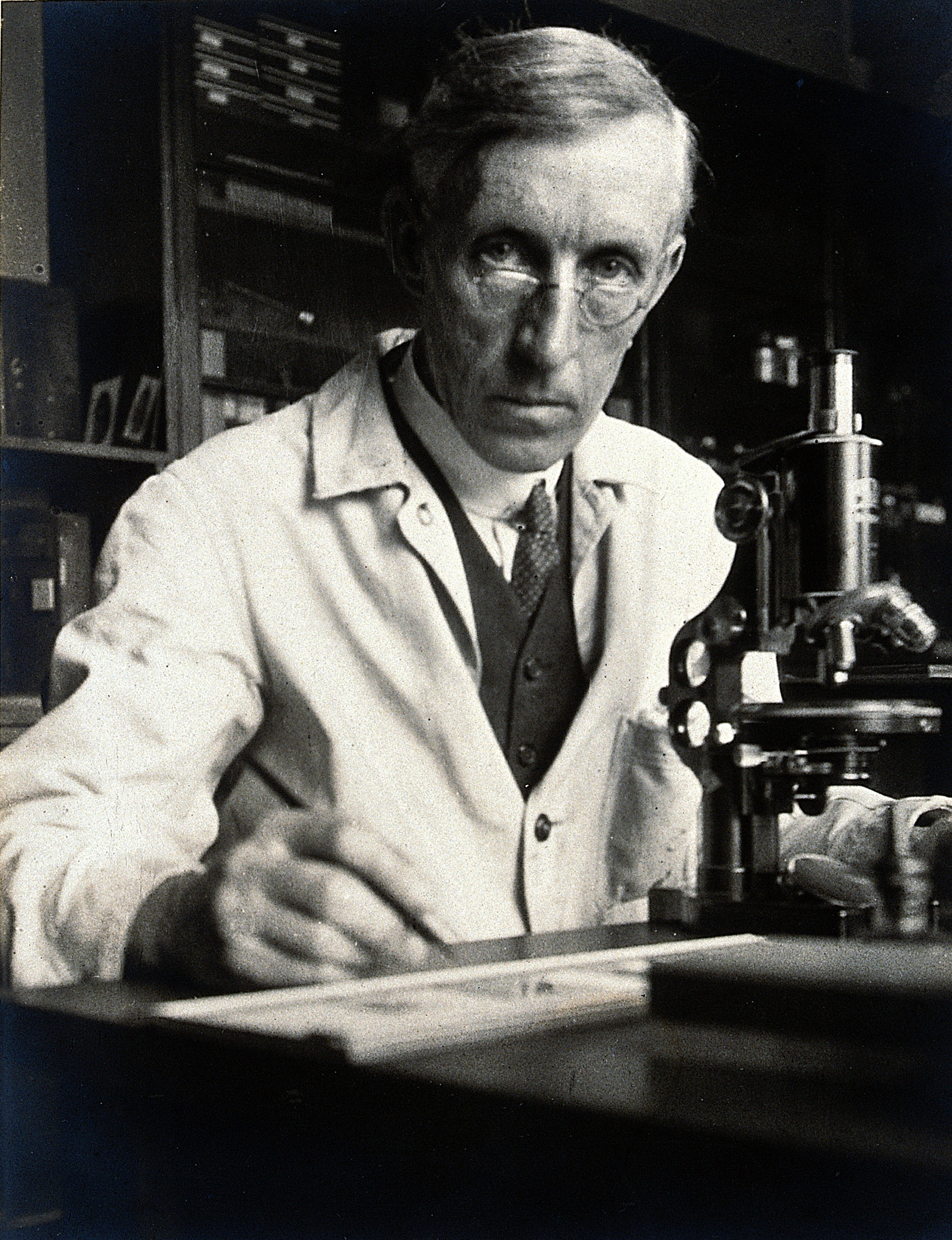
- Born: 21 February 1873
- Died: 24 May 1954 (aged 81)
- Education: University of Edinburgh
- Awards: Mueller Medal (1907); FRS (1913); Linnean Medal (1930); Croonian Lecture; Darwin Medal
- Scientific career
- Fields: Embryology
- Workplaces: University College London

James Peter Hill FRS (21 February 1873 – 24 May 1954) was a Scottish embryologist.

== Education ==
Hill was born in Kennoway, Scotland on 21 February. He attended the Royal High School, Edinburgh, and graduated with a Doctor of Science from the University of Edinburgh in 1903.

== Career ==
Hill moved to Australia in 1892. In Australia he formed with a group dubbed "The Fraternity of Duckmaloi" that did studies on the platypus and was named for a noted "hunting ground" for the animal. He is also noted for studies of marsupials. He returned to Britain and UCL in 1906 as the Jodrell Chair of Zoology and curator of what is now the Grant Museum of Zoology. In 1921 was made the first Chair of Embryology and Histology at UCL.

== Awards and honours ==
In 1907 he was awarded the Mueller Medal by the Australian and New Zealand Association for the Advancement of Science. He was elected a Fellow of the Royal Society in 1913 and delivered their Croonian Lecture in 1929. He received their Darwin Medal in 1940 for his research on marsupials and monotremes. He was elected President of the Anatomical Society of Great Britain and Ireland for 1939 to 1941.

== Personal life ==
He had retired in 1938, but is said to have continued working at home until his death.
