= Cruciform Building =

Building in London, England

General information
- Type: Hospital (originally)
- Architectural style: Gothic
- Location: London, England
- Coordinates: 51°31′26″N 0°08′07″W
- Completed: 1906

Design and construction
- Architect: Alfred Waterhouse

Listed Building – Grade II
- Official name: University College Hospital General Block Only and Attached Railings
- Designated: 12 March 1974
- Reference no.: 1113059

The Cruciform Building is a Grade II listed building in the Bloomsbury district of London. Named for its cruciform plan, it is currently part of University College London's campus.

== History ==
The site of the building was occupied by the old University College Hospital from 1833, a building designed by William Wilkins with later enlargements carried out through the 19th century. Originally called the North London Hospital it was renamed to its latter name in 1837.

Built as a new building to house the hospital, the Cruciform Building was designed by Alfred Waterhouse, and constructed between 1898 and 1906. John Blundell Maple, whose furniture business' premises were nearby, provided close to £200,000 for the rebuilding the year before. It was Alfred's last commission, as he died in 1905, with his son Paul Waterhouse seeing the building to completion. Paul would also produce designs for the UCL Medical School building to its immediate south.

The building would cease its function as a hospital in 1995, reacquired by the university a year later. From 1997, thorough refurbishment works were carried out by HLM Architects. The building now hosts the Wolfson Institute for Biomedical Research and parts of the UCL Medical School.

== Design ==
The building is defined by its cruciform plan, with operating theatres at the centre and wards in the wings. A layout devised by George Vivian Poore to isolate the wards and provide them with better ventilation.

Architecturally, the building employs a red-brick Gothic style, differentiating it from most of the other older buildings of the university campus which are mostly neoclassical.

== See also ==
- University College Hospital
- UCL Main Building
