= William Sharpey =

Scottish physiologist (1802–1880)

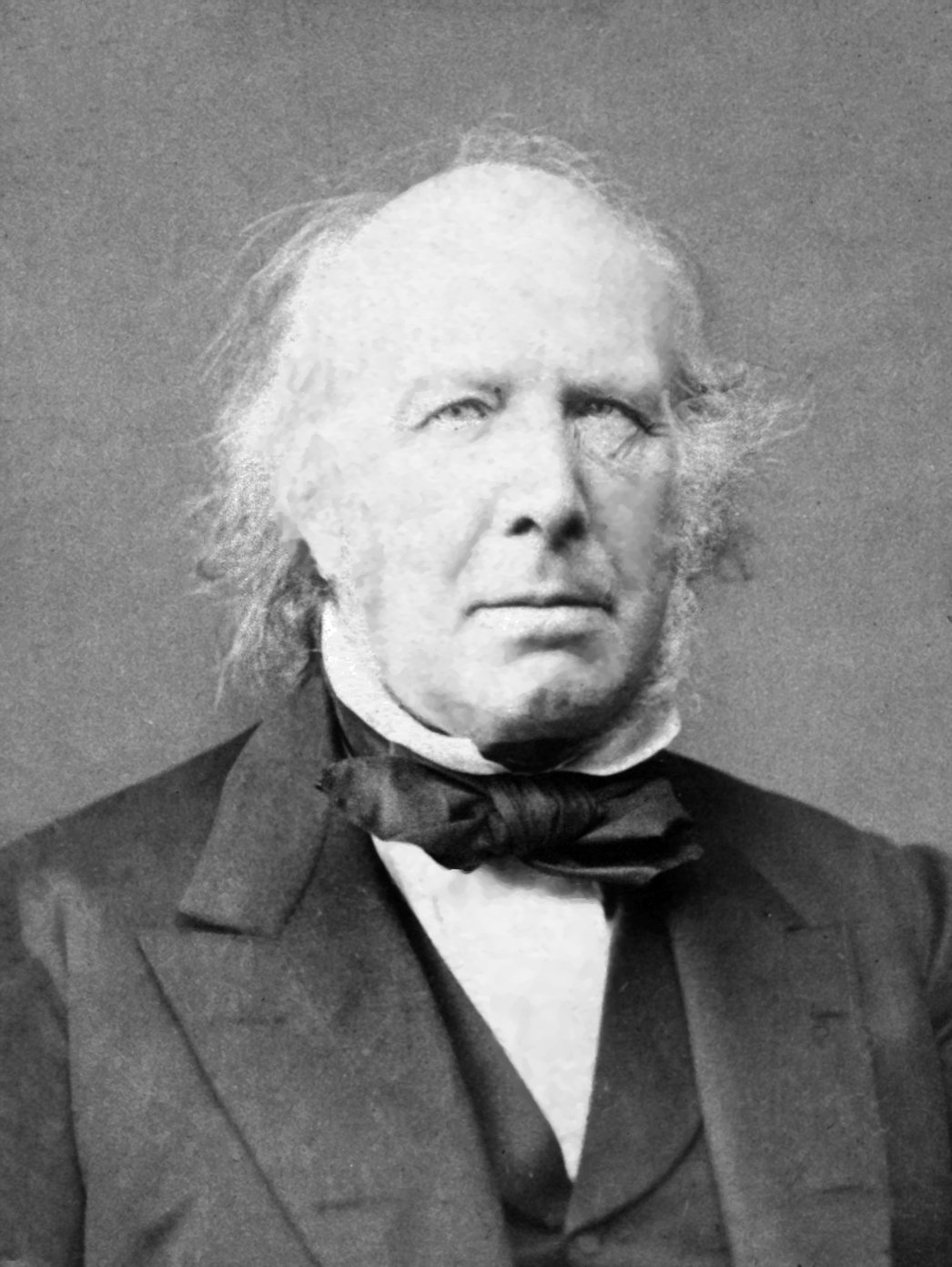
- Born: 1 April 1802; Arbroath, Scotland
- Died: 11 April 1880 (aged 78)

William Sharpey FRS FRSE LLD (1 April 1802 – 11 April 1880) was a Scottish anatomist and physiologist. Sharpey became the outstanding exponent of experimental biology and is described as the "father of British physiology".

== Early life ==
Sharpey was born in Arbroath on 1 April 1802, the youngest son of the five children Mary Balfour and Henry Sharpy (sic), a shipowner from Folkestone who died before Sharpey was born.

William was educated at the high school in Arbroath and, in November 1817, began studies at the University of Edinburgh, firstly studying humanities and natural philosophy. In 1818, he moved to the medical classes, learning anatomy from Professor John Barclay, who then was lecturing in the extra-academical school.

In 1821, Sharpey graduated with an MB ChB and was admitted a member of the Edinburgh College of Surgeons. He then went to London to broaden his anatomical experience in the private school of Joshua Brookes in Blenheim Street. He went to Paris in the autumn, and remained there for nearly a year, learning clinical surgery from Guillaume Dupuytren in the wards of the Hôtel Dieu, and operative surgery from Jacques Lisfranc de St. Martin. Here he made the acquaintance of James Syme, with whom he kept up a correspondence until Syme's death in 1870.

In August 1823, Sharpey was awarded his doctorate (MD) from the University of Edinburgh, with his thesis De Ventriculi Carcinomate, and then returned to Paris, where he spent most of 1824. He then appears to have settled for a time in Arbroath, where he began to practise under his step-father, Dr Arrott; but he then set out on a long hike in Europe, by foot through France to Switzerland, and on to Italy. In 1828, he stayed at Padua to work under Bartolomeo Panizza. He was then in Berlin for nine months working under Karl Rudolphi, and after that was at Heidelberg under Friedrich Tiedemann, and at Vienna.

== Academic career ==
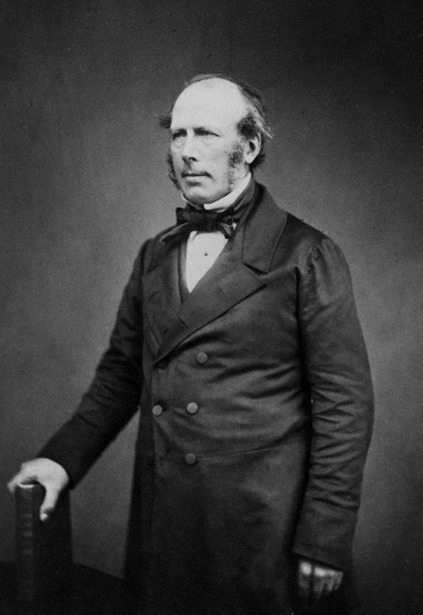
William Sharpey in 1855

Sharpey established himself in Edinburgh in 1829, and in the following year he obtained the fellowship of the College of Surgeons of Edinburgh, presenting a probationary essay On the Pathology and Treatment of False Joints. The diploma of fellow qualified him to become a teacher in Edinburgh; but in 1831 he again spent three months in Berlin. In 1831–1832, with Allen Thomson, who taught physiology, he gave a first course of lectures on systematic anatomy in the Extramural School of Medicine in Edinburgh. The association of Sharpey with Thomson lasted during the remainder of Sharpey's stay in Edinburgh. He was elected a fellow of the Royal Society of Edinburgh in 1834, his proposer being Sir Robert Christison. At this time he lived at 3 Alva Street in Edinburgh's West End. In 1835 he was elected a member of the Harveian Society of Edinburgh.

In July 1836 Sharpey was appointed to the chair of anatomy and physiology in the University of London in succession to Jones Quain. In this capacity Sharpey gave the first complete course of lectures on physiology and minute anatomy. His lectures then continued for 38 years. Sharpey was appointed in 1840 one of the examiners in anatomy at the university of London, and he was also a member of the senate of the University. He was elected a Fellow of the Royal Society on 9 May 1839. In 1846 he described the skeletal loadbearing fibres that now bear his name, Sharpey's fibres. He was made a member of its council in 1844, and was appointed one of the secretaries in place of Thomas Bell in November 1853, an office which he held until his retirement. He was also for 15 years, from April 1861, one of the members appointed by the Crown on the general council of medical education and registration. Sharpey was also one of the trustees of the Hunterian Museum in Glasgow.

In 1859 he received the honorary doctorate (LLD) for his literary works from the University of Edinburgh.

His pupils included Michael Foster, George Oliver, and Burdon Sanderson.

Sharpey was a correspondent and friend of Charles Darwin. He was also on the Commission on Scientific Instruction and the Advancement of Science, and was also a Fellow of the Geological Society.

== Later life ==
Troubled by failure of his eyesight, about 1871 Sharpey retired from the post of secretary of the Royal Society, and in 1874 from his professorship at University College. In 1874 he received a Civil Service pension from the government.

He died of bronchitis at 50 Torrington Square, London, on Sunday, 11 April 1880. He was buried with his parents in the graveyard of Arbroath Abbey.

== Family ==
He was half-brother to James Arrott, head physician at Dundee Royal Infirmary.

== Eponyms ==
- Sharpey's fibers—fibers that join together the lamellae of bone and anchor bone to tendon (W. Sharpey, 1846).

== Bibliography ==
From 1829 to 1836 Sharpey was engaged in scientific work, of which the earliest outcome was his paper on ciliary motion, published in 1830. He contributed to the many editions of Quain's Anatomy. His works included:

- De Ventriculi Carcinomate, Edinburgh, 1823.
- A Probationary Essay on the Pathology and Treatment of False Joints, Edinburgh, 1830.
- On a Peculiar Motion excited in Fluids of the Surfaces of Certain Animals (Edinburgh Medical and Surgical Journal, 1830, xxxiv. 113).
- Remarks on a supposed Spontaneous Motion of the Blood (Edinburgh Journal of Nat. and Geographical Science, 1831).
- An Account of Professor Ehrenberg's Researches on the Infusoria (Edinburgh Nat. Philosophical Journal, 1833, vol. xv.).
- 'Account of the Discovery by Purkinje and Valentin of Ciliary Motions in Reptiles and Warm-blooded Animals, with Remarks and Additional Experiments' (Edinburgh Nat. Philosophical Journal, 1830, vol. xix.)

The information in the last two articles is also in his contribution on "Cilia" to Robert Bentley Todd and William Bowman's Cyclopædia of Anatomy and Physiology (1836); Sharpey also wrote the article "Echinodermata" in this work. He edited the fifth, sixth, seventh, and eighth editions of Jones Quain's Elements of Anatomy; and contributed to William Baly's translation of Johannes Peter Müller's Physiology, 1837 and 1840.
