= UCL Main Building =

Main building of University College London

Coordinates: 51°31′29″N 0°08′01″W

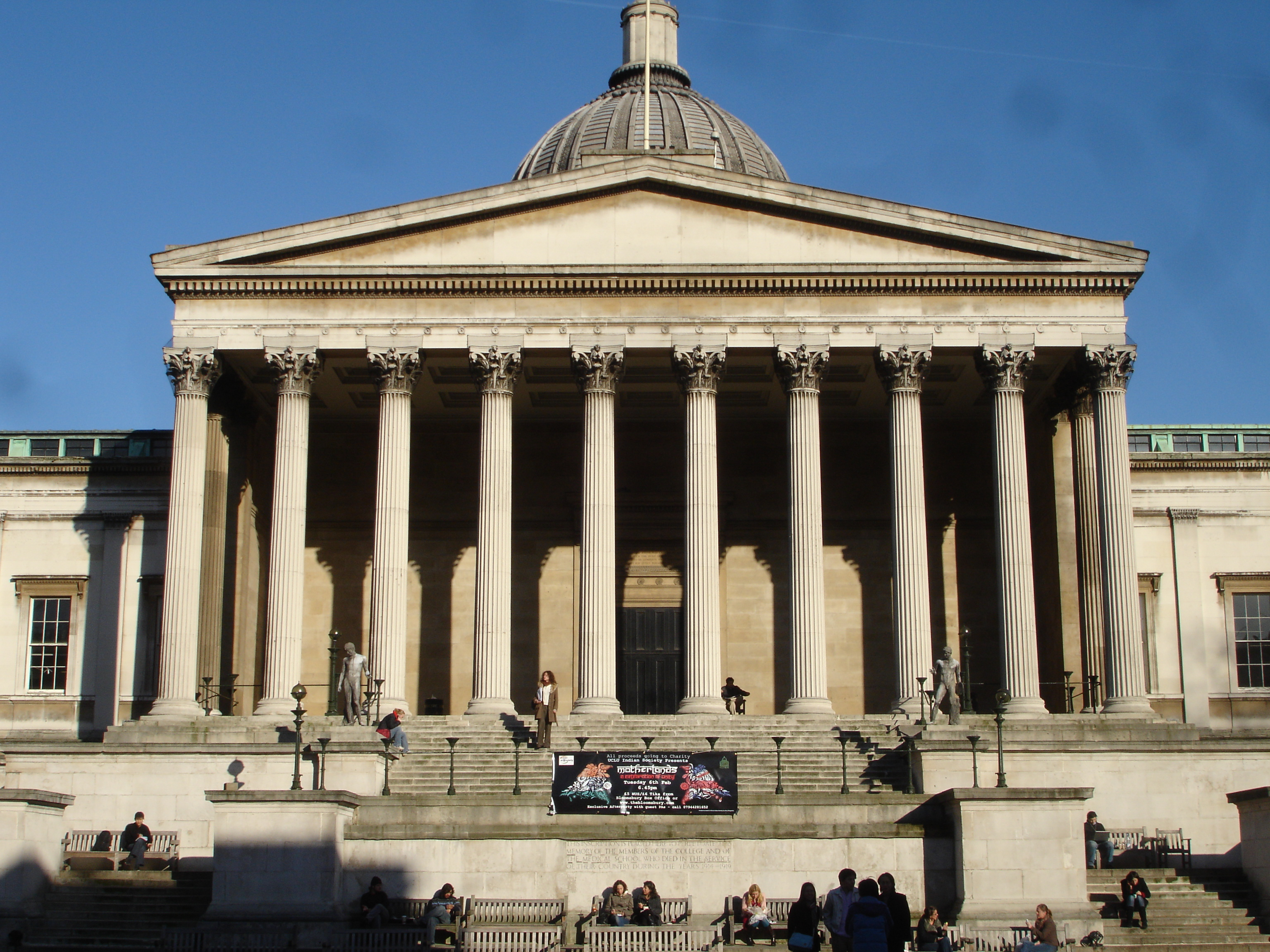
The UCL Main Building

The Main Building of University College London, facing onto Gower Street, Bloomsbury, includes the Octagon, Quad, Cloisters, Main Library, Flaxman Gallery and the Wilkins Building. The North Wing, South Wing, Chadwick Building and Pearson Building are also considered part of the main UCL building.

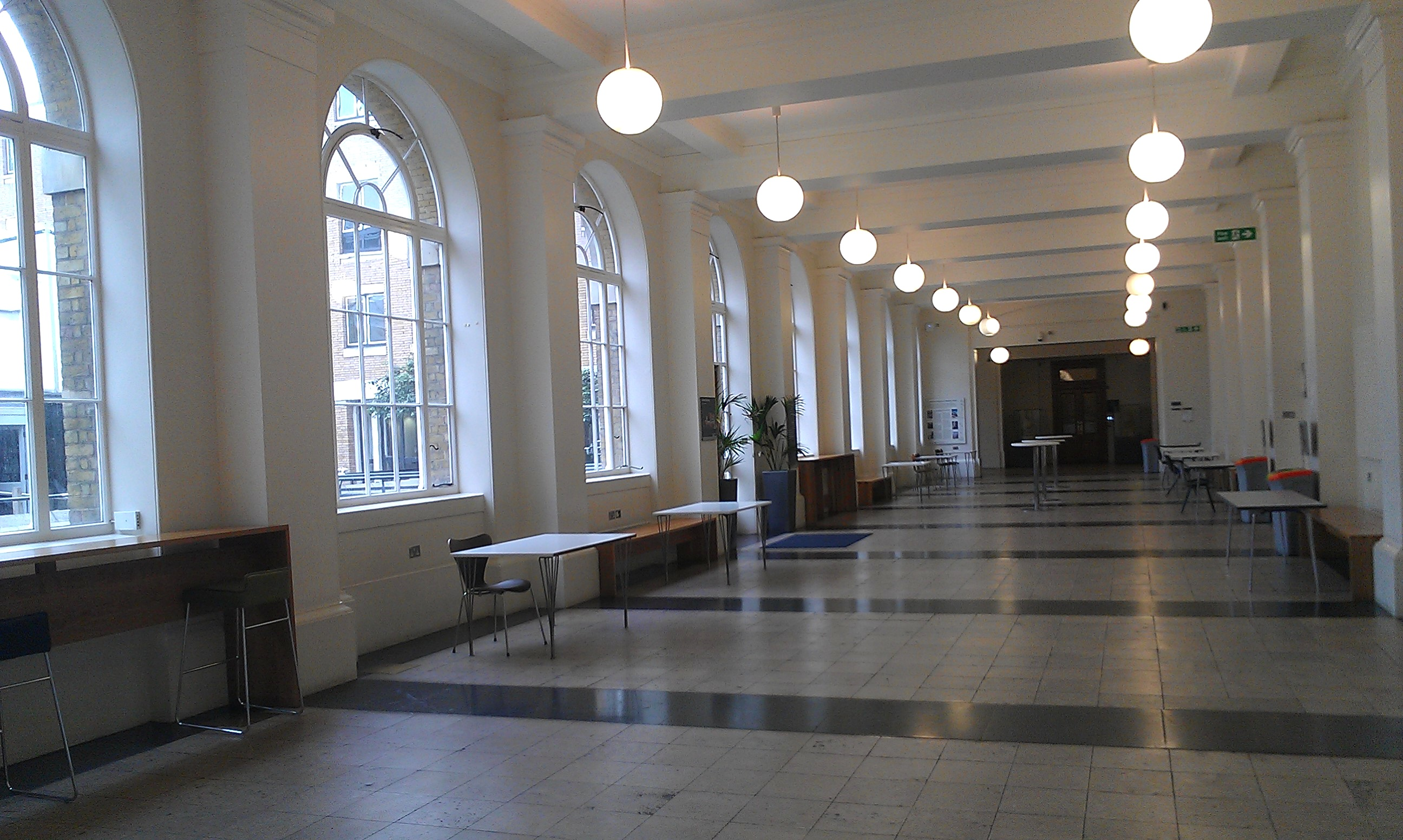
South Cloisters

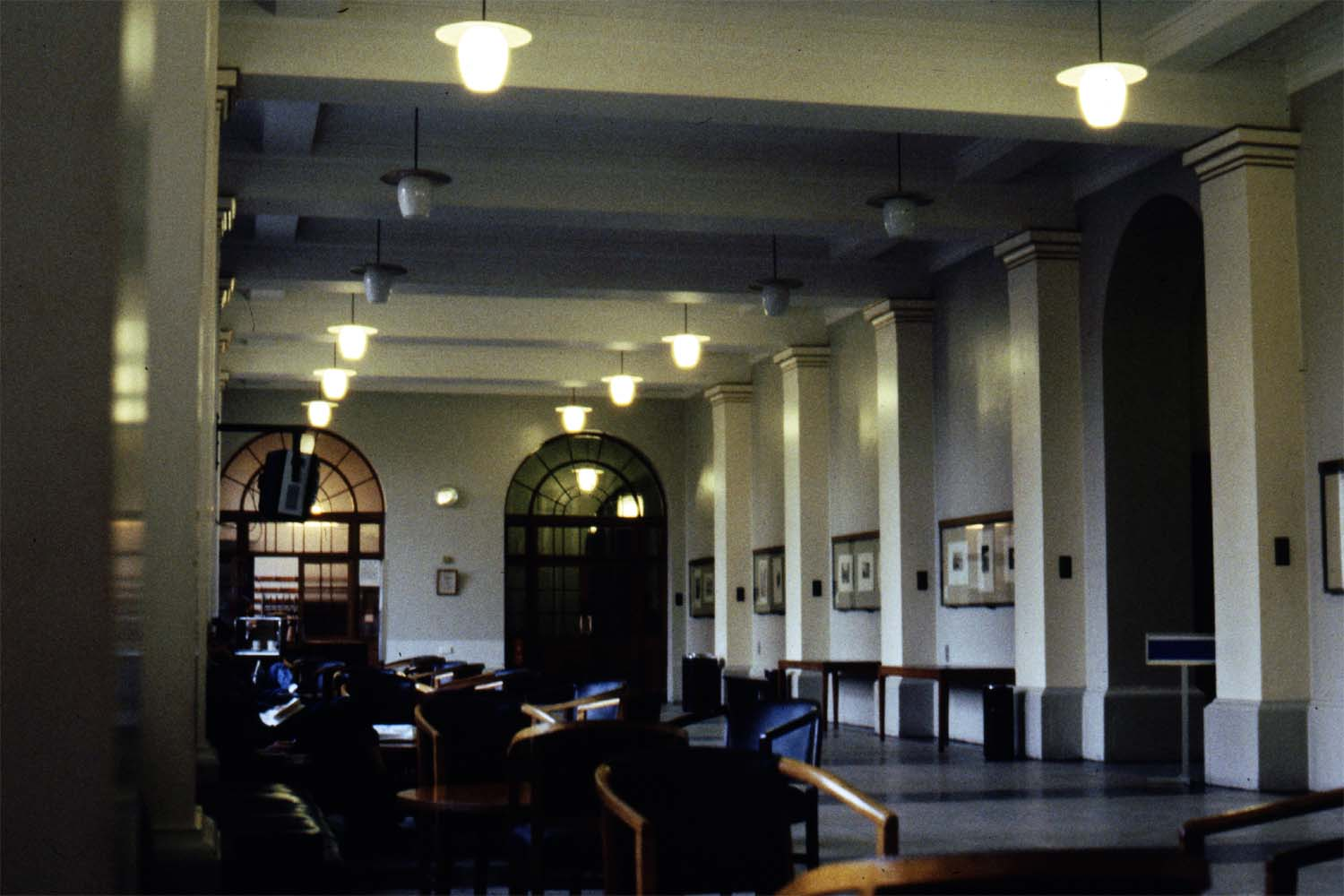
North Cloisters (1980s)

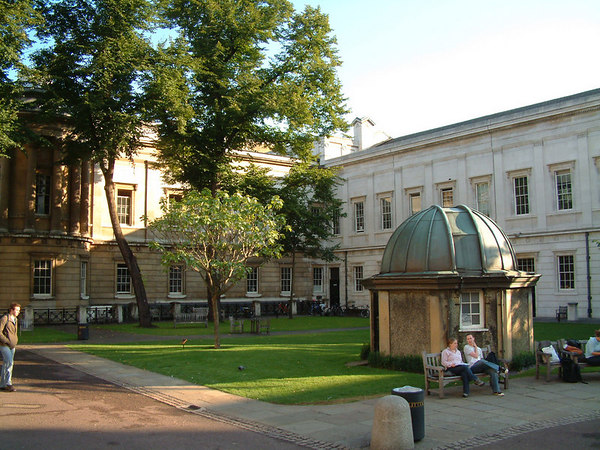
The Front Quad, including the Slade School of Fine Art (left background), the Main Building (right background), and the astronomy shed (right foreground)

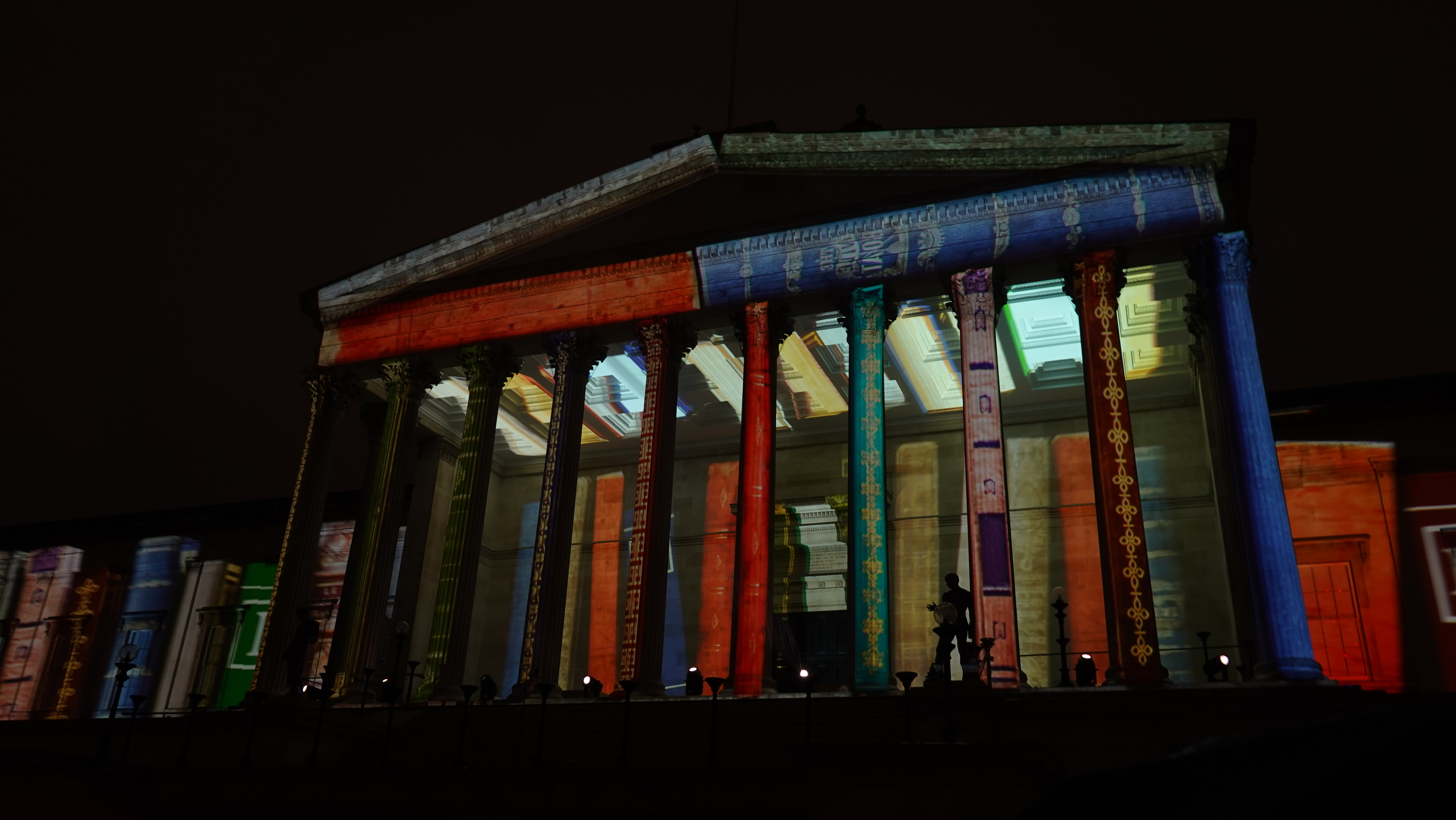
The Main Building during UCL Illuminated, a celebration of UCL's bicentenary in 2026

== History ==
In 1827, a year after the founding of UCL, construction of the main building began on the site of the old Carmarthen Square. At the centrepiece of the building is an ornate dome, which is visible throughout the immediate area. The Octagon was designed by the Architect William Wilkins, who also designed the National Gallery. The original plans by Wilkins called for a U-shaped enclosure around the quad. Funds, however, ran out in 1829 with only the portico and dome finished. Wilkins' original plans were not completed until the 20th century: The Main Building was finally finished in 1985, 158 years since the foundations were laid, with a formal opening ceremony by Queen Elizabeth II of the United Kingdom.

== Octagon ==
The Octagon dome houses the central hall of the University Main Library, which contains casts from the John Flaxman casts collection, and a mural depicting the construction of UCL in a mythical scene with Jeremy Bentham overlooking the plans. It is thought that this mural is the origin of the story that Bentham was the founder of the London University.

== Front Quad ==
Facing Gower Street, the Front Quadrangle, abbreviated as the "Quad", is an enclosed square of paths, grass and a few disabled car parking bays. There are a large number of benches as well as two decommissioned astronomy observatories.

== Cloisters ==
The enclosed north and south cloisters connect the Octagon dome to the north and south wings of the quad respectively. They are one of the main thoroughfares of the college, and accommodate a series of exhibitions and events throughout the year (for example shows from students of the Slade School of Art and from the UCL special collections). To the north of the north cloisters is the Housman Room, which is a staff common room. The auto-icon of Jeremy Bentham was located in the south of the south cloisters up until February 2020 when he was permanently relocated to the public atrium of the Student Centre.

== Wilkins Building ==
The Wilkins Building refers specifically to the part of the building built during the lifetime of the architect William Wilkins. It does not include the later, U-shaped extensions around the Quad. Although these were designed by Wilkins they were not finished until 1985. Therefore, the Wilkins Building refers to the oldest sections of the Main Building: the centre part of the main building which includes the UCL Main Library, the dome, the Flaxman Gallery and the Cloisters. The Wilkins Building (along with the south wing built in 1869–76, the north wing built in 1870–81 and parts of the west side built over 1912–52) is grade I listed; the two observatories in the quad are grade II listed.

== Main Library ==
The Main Library contains UCL's collections relating to arts and humanities, history, economics, public policy and law. The Flaxman Gallery, a collection of sculptures and paintings by artist John Flaxman, is located inside the Main Library in the Octagon Building under UCL's central dome.
