= List of presidents of the History of Medicine Society =

This is a list of presidents of the History of Medicine Society of the Royal Society of Medicine.

Numerous distinguished authors and historians became presidents and many more were invited to speak.

== 1912–1931 ==
| Years | Image | Name | Comments |
|---|---|---|---|
| 1912–1913 | | Sir William Osler | British Canadian, known as "king of pranks", Osler was one of the "big four" founding members of the Johns Hopkins Hospital where he had arrived in 1888 as physician in chief. He is best remembered for establishing the medical residency programme, taking medical students to the bedside, writing major textbooks and whilst in England as Regius Professor of Medicine at Oxford, founding the history of medicine section at the RSM in 1912. Raymond Crawfurd described him as a "magnet" in attracting members. Undeterred by opposing Sir Richard Douglas Powell who felt the Society had too many sections already, Osler meticulously planned the establishment of the History section, individually writing to more than 160 potential members. He considered the section one of his better achievements in his later years and his wish was for it to be a common meeting place for "scholars, students and all those who feel that the study of the history of medicine has a value in education". |
| 1913–1916 | | Sir Norman Moore, 1st Baronet | British physician, lecturer in anatomy and pathology and historian, Moore is best known for his connection with the Royal College of Physicians, GMC and his writings on history of medicine. To his disappointment he did not make the first president as Osler had recommended. |
| 1916–1918 | | Sir Raymond Henry Payne Crawfurd | Crawfurd graduated in classics from New College, Oxford in 1888, before studying medicine. Primarily physician and lecturer at King's College, he became its medical Dean and major player in moving the hospital to Denmark Hill, for which he was knighted in 1933. Due to chronic illness, he left active medicine and wrote on history of medicine, publications including, The Last Days of Charles II (1909), The King's Evil (1911) and Plague and Pestilence in Literature and Art (1914). |
| 1918–1919 | | Sir D'Arcy Power | Physician at St Bartholemew's, Power was a prolific writer of medical history. He later recalled how the section was "more like a family than an integral part of a great scientific society". |
| 1920–1922 | | Professor Charles Singer | Physician, pathologist and historian, he was invited to Oxford by William Osler in 1914, later becoming professor in history of medicine at University of London in 1930. One of the original history section members, Singer retained his position as editorial representative for twenty three years and maintained a high quality of the section's publications. He supported refugee scholars fleeing Nazi Europe and is known for his many publications of short histories. He kept a miniature set of traffic lights to control lengths of speakers, switching to red when they became dull or prolonged. |
| 1922–1924 | | Sir Arnold Chaplin | After studying at St. Bartholomew's Hospital Singer's primary appointment was at the City of London Hospital for Diseases of the Chest, where he remained for the next twenty-nine years. He co-authored the textbook on Fibroid Diseases of the Lung, and The Science and Art of Prescribing and wrote The Illness and Death of Napoleon Bonaparte (1913). He loved old books and prints, and became Harveian Librarian at the Royal College of Physicians. |
| 1924–1926 | | John Davy Rolleston | An original member of the Section, he was a member of the council, secretary and president. |
| 1926–1928 | | Walter G. Spencer | Known as "The Historian of Westminster" by fellow medics. |
| 1928–1930 | | Herbert R. Spencer | Obstetrician who wrote about William Harvey, midwifery and external cephalic version. |
| 1930–1931 | | Sir Humphry Rolleston | 57th president of RSM. |

== 1931–1960 ==
| Years | Image | Name | Comments |
|---|---|---|---|
| 1931–1933 | | Robert Oswald Moon | Consulting physician to the National Hospital for Diseases of the Heart and the Royal Waterloo Hospital and a staunch Liberal, and a member of the Reform Club. His main interest was in the classics and was demonstrated in his book on The Relation of Medicine to Philosophy, his Fitzpatrick Lecture before the Royal College of Physicians in 1921 on Hippocrates and his successors. He witnessed "three wars and contested five general elections". |
| 1933–1935 | | Sir St Clair Thomson | Wrote book Diseases of the Nose and Throat and was president of the Royal Society of Medicine between 1925 and 1927. |
| 1935–1937 | | Edwin Goodall | |
| 1937–1939 | | Alexander Polycleitos Cawadias | |
| 1941–1942 | | John Frederick Halls Dally | Chest physician |
| 1942–1944 | | Sir Walter Langdon-Brown | |
| 1944–1945 | | John Frederick Halls Dally | |
| 1945–1947 | | Sir Arthur MacNalty | |
| 1947–1948 | | Hubert James Norman | |
| 1948–1950 | | Edgar Ashworth Underwood | Married Singer's daughter, director of the Wellcome Institute for the History of Medicine, (1946-1964) & influenced Sir Henry Wellcome's collection. Revised Singer's short history of medicine (1962). |
| 1950–1952 | | Lilian Lindsay | |
| 1952–1954 | | Lord Webb-Johnson | |
| 1954–1956 | | Sir Zachary Cope | Physician and surgeon who wrote a textbook on surgery and the history of medicine. At the jubilee meeting of the section, he pleaded for younger professionals to be involved. |
| 1956–1957 | | Douglas Guthrie | Guthrie, an ENT surgeon, wrote A History of Medicine (1945), which gained fame following a review by George Bernard Shaw. He gave his presidential address in 1957 when he stated "…it is obvious that history supplies an essential basis of medicine. It gives us ideals to follow, inspirations for our work and hope for the future". |
| 1957–1959 | | Sir Weldon Dalrymple-Champneys | |
| 1959–1960 | | Cuthbert Dukes | |

== 1960–1990 ==
| Years | Image | Name | Comments |
|---|---|---|---|
| 1960–1962 | | Kenneth David Keele | |
| 1962–1964 | | William Henry McMenemey | |
| 1964–1966 | | W. S. Copeman | Accomplishing a great deal to promote history of medicine, Copeman attributed the establishment of the faculty of history of medicine and philosophy in 1959 to much of the section's influence. |
| 1966–1968 | | Henry Cohen, 1st Baron Cohen of Birkenhead | |
| 1968–1970 | | Sir Terence Cawthorne | ENT surgeon at King's College Hospital and various other London hospitals, Cawthorne also became president of the Harveian Society and the Royal Society of Medicine. He was knighted in 1964. In 1968, he was elected president of the section.However, he died before delivering his address. |
| 1970–1972 | | Kenneth Bryn Thomas | |
| 1972–1973 | | Richard Alfred Hunter | |
| 1973–1975 | | William Hartston | Chest physician and lecturer for DHMSA. |
| 1975–1977 | | Frederick F Cartwright | Anaesthetist with special interest in Otolaryngology, Cartwright published on history of medicine, became Head of the Department of History of Medicine at King's College Medical School, London and was active at the Faculty of History of Medicine and Philosophy of the Worshipful Society of Apothecaries. |
| 1977–1979 | | Alan Waller Woodruff | |
| 1979–1981 | | Peter Maxwell Daniel | |
| 1981–1983 | | Thomas Douglas Whittet | |
| 1983–1985 | | Gweneth Whitteridge | |
| 1986–1987 | | Victor Cornelius Medvei | |
| 1987–1988 | | John M. T. Ford | Actively involved in the Worshipful Society of Apothecaries |
| 1988–1989 | | Alex Sakula | |
| 1989–1990 | | Theodore T. Macadam | |

== 1990–2010 ==
| Years | Image | Name | Comments |
|---|---|---|---|
| 1990–1991 | | Henry R. Rollin | |
| 1991–1992 | | John R. Kircup | |
| 1992–1993 | | Richard Creese | |
| 1993–1994 | | Denis Dunbar Gibbs | |
| 1994–1995 | | Aileen Adams | |
| 1995–1996 | | Dame Josephine Barnes | |
| 1996–1997 | | Elliott E. Philipp | |
| 1997–1998 | | Robin Price | |
| 1998–1999 | | Michael A. Smith | |
| 1999–2000 | | Sir David Innes Williams | |
| 2000–2001 | | Nicholas Cambridge | |
| 2001–2002 | | Neil Weir | |
| 2002–2003 | | Raymond L. Hurt | |
| 2003–2004 | | Gordon Cook | |
| 2004–2005 | | Sue Weir | |
| 2005–2006 | | K. M. N. Kunzru | |
| 2006–2007 | | John Harcup (d. 9 February 2023) | |
| 2007–2008 | | Adrian Marston | |
| 2008–2009 | | Jean Guy | |
| 2009–2010 | | Tina Matthews | |

== 2010–2026 ==
| Years | Image | Name | Comments |
|---|---|---|---|
| 2010–2011 | | Claire Elliott | |
| 2011–2012 | | Colin Birt | |
| 2012–2013 | | Richard Pusey | |
| 2013–2014 | | Jennian Geddes | |
| 2014–2015 | | Stanley Gelbier | Emeritus professor of dental public health and honorary professor of the history of dentistry at King's College London. He is a former curator of the British Dental Association's museum. |
| 2015–2016 | | David Siegler | |
| 2016–2017 | | Julie Papworth | |
| 2017–2018 | | Catherine Sarraf | |
| 2019–2020 | | Stephen J. Challacombe | Professor of oral medicine at King's College in London, best known for research in oromucosal immunology and for developing the Challacombe scale for measuring the extent of dryness of the mouth. He led the team that laid out research challenges of global health inequalities and oral health, particularly relating to the oral manifestations of HIV. |
| 2020–2021 | | Tilli Tansey | |
| 2021–2022 | | Sean P. F. Hughes | |
| 2022-2023 | | Christopher Gardner-Thorpe | |
| 2023-2024 | | Hilary Morris | |
| 2024- | | Andreas Demetriades | |
| 2025 | | Marguerite Dupree | |
| 2026 | | Nadey Hakim | |
