= List of presidents of the Osler Club of London =

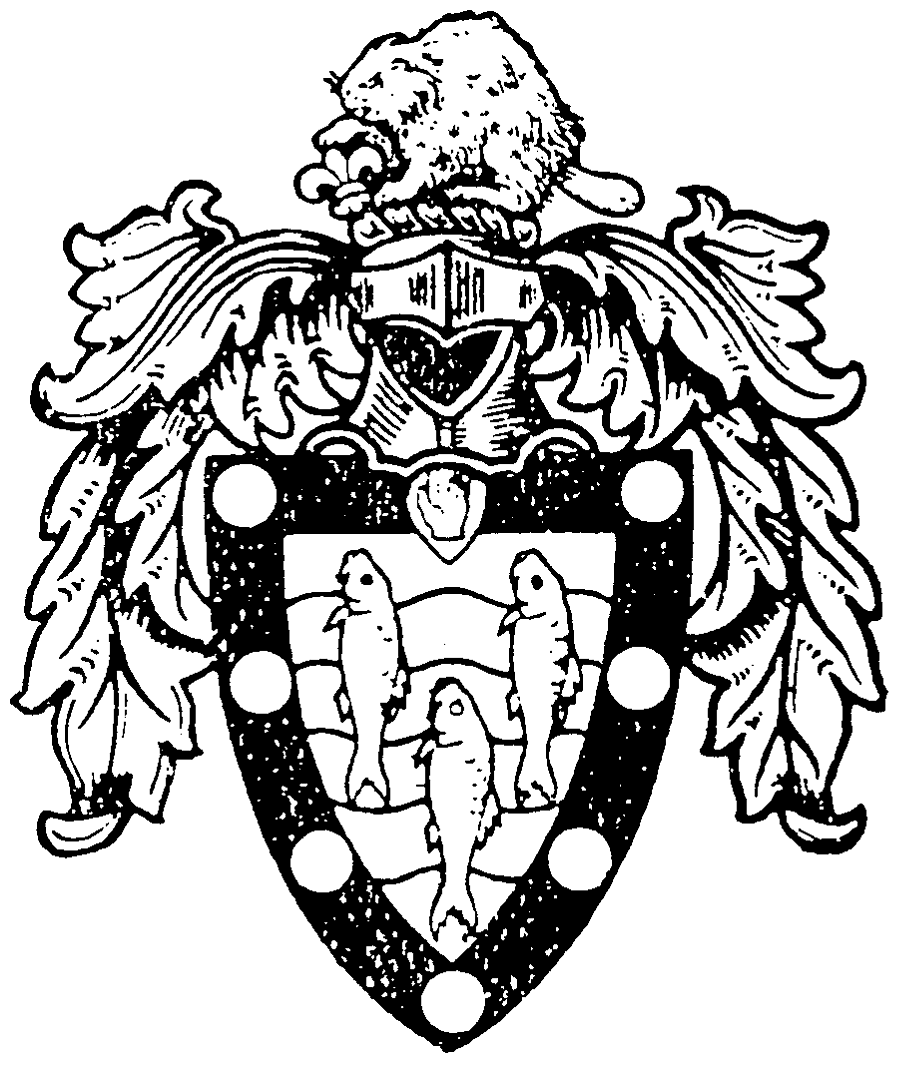
Sir William Osler, 1st Baronet coat of arms

The presidents of the Osler Club of London have been:

Tenure	Name	Notes	Image
1950–1952	Sir Zachary Cope		Sir Vincent Zachary Cope
1952–1954	Alfred White Franklin (1905–1984)	Franklin co–founded the Osler Club of London while he was a medical student at St Bartholomew's Hospital, London and later wrote a biography of Sir William Osler.	
1954–1956	Vivian Green-Armytage (1882–1961)	Green–Armytage was a gynecologist, noted for his progressive views, his service to Indian gynaecology and obstetrics, and his distinguished service in the Royal Army Medical Corps during the First World War.	Vivian Bartley Green-Armytage IMS
1956–1958	W. S. C. Copeman (1900–1970)	Copeman was a rheumatologist and a medical historian, best remembered for his contributions to the study of arthritic disease.	Portrait of William Copeman Wellcome L0015922
1958–1961	Arthur Dickson Wright (1897–1976)		
1961–1963	Harold Avery		
1963–1965	Charles Edward Newman		
1965–1967	Noël Poynter (1908–1979)	Librarian then Director of the Wellcome Institute for the History of Medicine.	Noël Poynter
1967–1969	Jessie Dobson (1906–1984)	Between 1954 and 1971, Dobson was the curator of the Hunterian Museum at the Royal College of Surgeons of England.	
1969–1971	Kenneth Bryn Thomas (1915–1978)		
1971–1972	D. Geraint James (1922–2010)	James was a Welsh physician known for his work on sarcoidosis. He set up a specialist clinic for the condition and earned the nickname of the "King of Sarcoid".	
1972–1974	John Cule	Cule was a Welsh general practitioner and later psychiatrist.	
1975–1976	Henry R. Rollin		
1976–1978	Neil McIntyre		
1978–1980	P. M. Daniel		
1980–1981	L. G. Matthews		
1981–1982	Victor Cornelius Medvei		
1982–1983	B. T. Davis		
1983–1984	Arthur Hollman		
1984–1985	Alex Sakula		
1985–1986	Theodore T. Macadam		
1986–1987	Harvey White	In 1976, White became consultant surgeon at the Royal Marsden Hospital. Subsequently, he held posts at King Edward VII Hospital for Officers, St Luke's Hospital for the Clergy and The London Clinic. He is a past president of the Medical Society of London and vice president of the British Association of Surgical Oncology and Royal Society of Medicine. In 2012, he was the first recipient of the Royal Society of Medicine Medal.	Harvey White at the Medical Society of London 2
1987–1988	Ruth Bowden		
1988–1989	Dame Josephine Barnes (1912–1999)	Barnes was a leading obstetrician and gynaecologist and the first female president of the British Medical Association, 1979. She was also active in the Women's National Cancer Control Campaign with cancer screening.	Photograph portrait of Josephine Barnes. Wellcome L0004409
1989–1990	Sir Gordon Wolstenholme		
1990–1991	Sir Harold Ellis		
1991–1992	Sydney Selwyn		
1992–1993	John Garrett		
1993–1995	Gordon Cook		
1995–1997	William Dinning		
1997–1999	Edward (Ted) Howard		
1999–2001	John W. K. Ward	Ward is a general practitioner, fellow of both the Royal College of Physicians Edinburgh and Royal College of General Practitioners. He is a past president of the British Society for the History of Medicine and was chairman at the annual meeting of the American Osler Society in Oxford in 2014.	John Ward (physician), Osler Club of London 2019
2001–2003	James Heron		
2003–2005	Raymond Hunt		
2005–2007	David Green		
2007–2009	John Walker-Smith		
2009–2011	Adrian Thomas	Thomas is a retired radiologist, and visiting professor at Canterbury Christ Church University. He is a past president of the British Society for the History of Medicine.	Adrian Thomas (radiologist)
2011–2013	Peter Simpson		
2013–2015	Andrew Hilson		
2015–2017	Richard Osborn	In 2017, Osborn retired from leadership roles in library services, in which he worked for 32 years.	
2017–2019	Sarah Peart		
2019–2021	Graham Kyle	Kyle is a retired ophthalmic surgeon who, after obtaining the Diploma in the History of Medicine of the Society of Apothecaries of London in 2014, lectures on history of medicine and medical ethics and law.	Graham Kyle, ophthalmic surgeon
2023–2025	Daniel Sokol		
2025–	Mike Collins		

== See also ==
- Osler Club of London
