= Kenneth Thomas =

Kenneth, Ken or Kenny Thomas may refer to:

- Kenneth Thomas (chess player) (born 1938), chief financial officer of the United States Chess Federation
- Ken Thomas (trade unionist) (1927–2008), Welsh trade unionist and general secretary of the Civil and Public Services Association
- Ken Thomas (music producer), English record producer and recording engineer
- Ken Thomas (American football) (1960–2002), American football running back
- Kenny Thomas (basketball) (born 1977), American basketball player
- Kenny Thomas (singer) (born 1968), British dance music singer
- Keni Thomas (born 1965), American country music singer and motivational speaker
- Kenneth Bryn Thomas (1915–1978), English physician
