= William John Bishop =

British editor, writer, and librarian

- Born: 1903
- Died: 27 July 1961 (aged 57–58)
- Occupation: Medical librarian
- Known for: A Seventeenth Century Doctor and his Patients: John Symcotts, 1592?–1662 (1951)

William John Bishop FLA (1903 – 27 July 1961) was a British librarian, the first editor of the journal Medical History, and a prolific writer. With his friend Frederick Noël Lawrence Poynter, he wrote about John Symcotts, a medical attendant of Oliver Cromwell in A Seventeenth Century Doctor and his Patients: John Symcotts, 1592?–1662.

After completing his early education from Sir Walter St John's Grammar School for Boys, he became a librarian assistant at the London Library and then assistant librarian to Arnold Chaplin at the Royal College of Physicians. He subsequently read papers to the History of Medicine Section and later joined the library of the Royal Society of Medicine.

In 1946 the Wellcome Historical Medical Library appointed him as their librarian. Five years after publishing the book on Symcotts, he became the first editor of the journal Medical History. He wrote several other books and in retirement continued to contribute as librarian of the Royal College of Obstetricians and Gynaecologists.

He was elected to both the fellowship of the Library Association and honorary membership of the Royal Society of Medicine.

== Early life and career ==
William Bishop was born in London in 1903. He was educated at Sir Walter St John's Grammar School for Boys in Battersea .

He began a career in librarianship as a junior assistant at the London Library, under the supervision of Sir Charles Hagberg Wright. Four years later he became assistant librarian to Arnold Chaplin, the Harveian Librarian at the Royal College of Physicians, where he also became acquainted with Sir Humphry Rolleston.

He read his first paper to the History of Medicine Section of the Royal Society of Medicine (RSM) at the age of 26. Titled "English Physicians in Russia- in the Sixteenth and Seventeenth Centuries", it was published in 1929 in the Proceedings of the Royal Society of Medicine. In 1932 he read a paper to the RSM entitled "The Autobiographies of British Medical Men". During the Second World War, whilst working in the RSM library, he accompanied a large part of the library's stock to St. Albans in Hertfordshire. His own house was completely destroyed in an air raid during the war.

In 1935, he was elected to the fellowship of the Library Association, of which he was a co-founder of its Medical Section in 1947.

== Later career ==
In 1946, the Wellcome Historical Medical Library, appointed him as their librarian. In 1957, he became the first editor of the journal Medical History, a role he continued until his death in 1961, when he was succeeded by Poynter. He retired in 1951 but continued to contribute as librarian of the Royal College of Obstetricians and Gynaecologists. In 1959 he was elected to honorary membership of the Royal Society of Medicine.

== Writing ==
In 1951, with his friend Frederick Noël Lawrence Poynter, he published a study of a sometime physician to Oliver Cromwell titled A Seventeenth Century Doctor and his Patients: John Symcotts, 1592?–1662. The book was described as particularly welcome for dealing with the type of everyday medical practice of a merciful but "not very exalted" physician for whom there had previously been no memorial.

He wrote Notable Names in Medicine and Surgery (1944) and The Early History of Surgery (1960), contributed to the Dictionary of National Biography, was involved in a project pertaining to Florence Nightingale and planned a compilation titled Dictionary of British Medical Biography.

== Death and legacy ==
Bishop died unexpectedly on 27 July 1961 at the age of 57. His address at the time of his death was 69 Anne Boleyns Walk, Cheam, Surrey. He received an obituary from John Fulton in the British Medical Journal who compared him to Charles Singer as "prime fosterers of medico-historical studies in England". He left an estate of £10,202, administration of which was granted to Joan Margaret Bishop, spinster, and John Clive Bishop, estate agent. His bio-bibliography of Florence Nightingale and calendar of her letters were completed after his death by [[Sue [M.] Goldie]].

== Selected publications ==
- Notable Names in Medicine and Surgery. 1944. (2nd edition 1946, 3rd edition 1959)
- Medicine and Science in Postage Stamps. Harvey & Blythe, 1948. (With Norman Murdoch Matheson)
- A Seventeenth Century Doctor and his Patients: John Symcotts, 1592?–1662. John Symcotts, Streatley, 1951. (Edited with F.N.L. Poynter)
- Catalogue of the Library up to 1850. Royal College of Obstetricians and Gynaecologists, Manchester, 1956. (Compiler)
- Bibliography of International Congresses of Medical Sciences = Bibliographie des congrès internationaux des sciences médicales. Blackwell, Oxford, 1958. (Compiler)
- The Early History of Surgery. Hale, London, 1960. (Reissued as Knife, Fire and Boiling Oil: The Early History of Surgery, 2010)
- A Bio-bibliography of Florence Nightingale. Dawsons for The International Council of Nurses, London, 1962. (Completed by Sue Goldie)
