= Whittet =

Whittet is a Scottish surname most frequently found in Perthshire and Angus. It is a variant of Whitehead. Other variants include Whiddett.

Notable people with the name include:

- John Whittet (1925–1989), U.S. Navy officer.
- Lawrence C. Whittet (1871–1954), American politician.
- Brendan Whittet (born 1971), American ice hockey coach.
- Thomas Douglas Whittet (1915–1987), a British pharmacist and former president of the History of Medicine Society.
