= Hartston =

Hartston is a surname of English origin. People with that name include:

- Jana Bellin (born Jana Malypetrová, 1947), Czech-born British chess player, formerly married to William Hartston
- William Hartston (born 1947), English journalist, chess player and chess author
- William Hartston (physician) (1904–1980), English physician, president of the History of Medicine Society of the Royal Society of Medicine 1973–1975

== See also ==
- Hartstone, a surname
