= Adrian Marston =

British surgeon and medical academic

Jeffery Adrian Priestley Marston (15 December 1927 – 7 April 2016) was a British surgeon and medical academic. the academic dean of the Royal Society of Medicine and the president of the society's History of Medicine Society for 2007/08.

His maternal great grandfather was Jeffery Allen Marston, principal medical officer to the Indian Army.

== See also ==
- List of presidents of the History of Medicine Society
