= Walter Spencer =

Walter Spencer may refer to:

- Walter Baldwin Spencer (1860–1929), British-Australian biologist and anthropologist
- Walter Spencer (Canadian football) (born 1978), Canadian football linebacker
- Walter Spencer (MP), MP for Barnstaple
- Walter G. Spencer (died 1940), medical historian and surgeon

== See also ==
- Walter Spencer-Stanhope (disambiguation)
