= Peter Daniel =

Peter Daniel may refer to:

- Peter Daniel (Australian footballer) (born 1947), Australian rules player and coach
- Peter Daniel (footballer, born 1955), English association footballer
- Peter Daniel (footballer, born 1946), English association footballer
- Peter V. Daniel (1784–1860), American jurist
- Peter Maxwell Daniel (1910–1998), British medical doctor
