= Hartstone =

Hartstone is a surname of British origin. People with that name include:

- Graham V. Hartstone, British sound engineer
- Nina Hartstone, British sound editor

== See also ==
- Hartston, a surname
