= Harold Ellis (surgeon) =

English surgeon (1926–2026)

Harold Ellis CBE FRCS
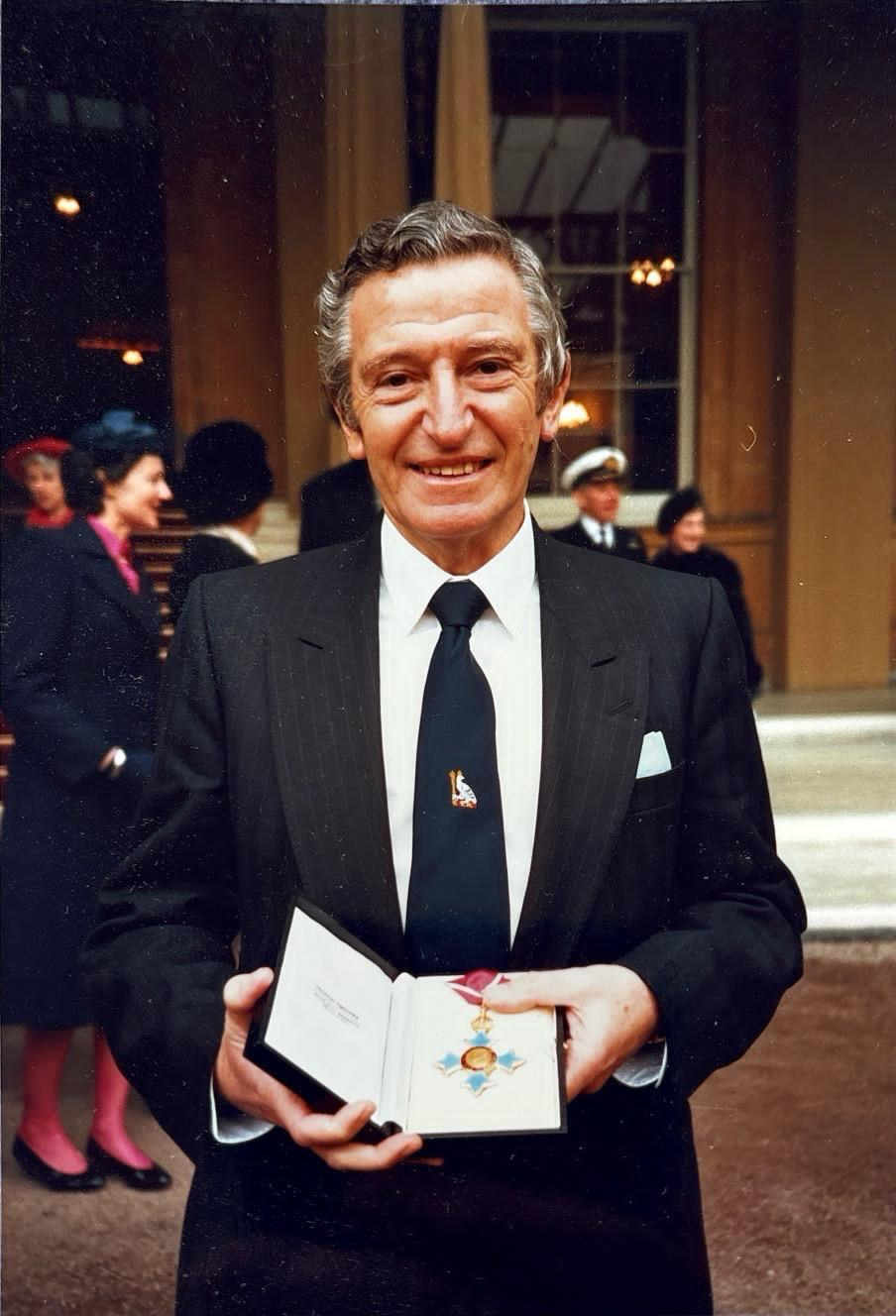
- Ellis receiving his CBE in 1987
- Born: Henry Ellis; 13 January 1926; London, England
- Died: 25 March 2026 (aged 100); London, England
- Education: The Queen's College, Oxford
- Occupation: Surgeon

Harold Ellis, CBE, MCh, FRCS (born Henry Ellis; 13 January 1926 – 25 March 2026) was an English surgeon. He was a professor of surgery at the University of London and professor in the Department of Anatomy and Human Sciences at the King's College London School of Medicine.

Ellis held positions as a vice-president of the Royal College of Surgeons of England and of the Royal Society of Medicine and was president of the British Association of Surgical Oncology.

== Early life and education ==
Harold Ellis was born as Henry Ellis in Stepney Green on 13 January 1926, the youngest of four children to dress makers. He completed his early education from St Olave's Grammar School before gaining admission to study medicine at Oxford University Medical School.

== Early career ==
Ellis qualified as a doctor from Oxford in July 1948, the same month the National Health Service began. He subsequently took up a post at the Radcliffe Hospital in Oxford before completing national service from 1950 to 1951 as a captain in the Royal Army Medical Corps. During his military service, he was responsible for the care of servicemen returning from the Korean War with severe spinal and cranial injuries. Afterwards, he continued his training as a surgical registrar in London, Sheffield and Oxford before taking up a post as senior lecturer in the University of London. In 1962, he took up the foundation chair of surgery at the Westminster Hospital, a post which he held until his retirement from practice in 1989. After a stint teaching anatomy in the University of Cambridge, he became clinical anatomist at Guy's Hospital in 1993.

He was one of the most notable British surgeons of the past 50 years, renowned both for his inspirational teaching and as the author of the definitive student textbook Clinical Anatomy, now in its fourteenth edition.

== Death ==
Ellis turned 100 on 13 January 2026, and died on 25 March.

== Awards and honours ==
In 1986, Ellis delivered the Bradshaw Lecture on the subject of breast cancer. He was a Fellow of the Royal College of Surgeons, and was appointed Commander of the Order of the British Empire (CBE) in the 1987 New Year Honours.

The Professor Harold Ellis Medical Student Prize for Surgery is named after him, and was awarded by the Royal College of Surgeons from 2007. The International Journal of Surgery awarded the Harold Ellis Prize in Surgery annually since 2003.

== Selected publications ==
- Ellis, Harold and Mahadevan, Vishy (2019). Clinical Anatomy: Applied Anatomy for Students and Junior Doctors (Fourteenth edition). Oxford: Wiley-Blackwell. ISBN 978-1-119-32551-2.
- Ellis, Harold and Abdalla, Sala (2019). A History of Surgery (Third Edition). CRC Press. ISBN 978-1-138-61739-1.
- Ellis, Harold (2019). Operations that Made History. CRC Press. ISBN 978-1-138-33431-1.
- Ellis, Harold, Sir Roy Calne and Watson, Christopher (2006). Lecture notes on general surgery (Eleventh edition). Oxford: Blackwell Scientific. ISBN 978-1-4051-3911-3.
- Ellis, Harold (2009). Cambridge Illustrated History of Surgery (Second edition). Cambridge: Cambridge University Press. ISBN 978-0-521-72033-5.
- Kinirons, Mark and Ellis, Harold (2011). French's Index of Differential Diagnosis: An A-Z (Fifteenth edition). Hodder Arnold. ISBN 978-0-340-99071-1.
- Ellis, Harold, Logan, Bari and Dixon, Adrian (2009). Human Sectional Anatomy: Pocket Atlas of Body Sections, CT and MRI Images (Third edition). Hodder Arnold. ISBN 978-0-340-98516-8.
- Ellis, Harold and Watson, Christopher (2001). Pocket Diagnosis in General Surgery (Third edition). Wiley-Blackwell. ISBN 978-0-632-05479-4.
- Ellis, Harold, Feldman, Stanley and Harrop-Griffiths, William (2003). Anatomy for Anaesthetists (Eighth edition). Wiley-Blackwell. ISBN 978-1-4051-0663-4.

== See also ==
- List of presidents of the Osler Club of London
