= Theodore T. Macadam =

Theodore T. Macadam was a pharmaceutical industry executive. He was president of the History of Medicine Society of the Royal Society of Medicine from 1989 to 1990. He was treasurer of the Osler Club of London from 1978 to 1994.

== See also ==
- List of presidents of the History of Medicine Society
