= John Symcotts =

John Symcotts (1592–1662) was an English physician, whose private casebook has been studied to understand typical medical practice in 17th century England. He was sometimes the physician to Oliver Cromwell. An account of his medical career was published in 1951 jointly by William John Bishop and Noël Poynter, in a book entitled A Seventeenth Century Doctor and his Patients: John Symcotts, 1592?–1662.
