= Jeffery Allen Marston =

British military officer

- Born: Jeffery Allen Marston; 31 December 1831
- Died: 31 March 1911 (aged 79)

Jeffery Allen Marston (31 December 1831 – 31 March 1911) CB, Hon. FRCS, was Principal Medical Officer to the Indian Army and honorary surgeon to Queen Victoria and then King Edward VII.

== Early life ==
Jeffery Marston was born on 31 December 1831 in Martham, Norfolk. He studied at the University of Glasgow, at Newcastle Hospital, and in London, and graduated with an M.D. from the University of St Andrews in 1854.

== Career ==
Marston joined the British Army as an assistant surgeon on 10 November 1854. In 1863 he was the first to describe Mediterranean fever. In 1877 he drew up dietary guidelines for military prisons. He became Deputy Surgeons-General in 1882, became a member of the Royal College of Physicians of London in 1887, and became a C.B. in 1887 and F.R.C.S.Eng. in 1888.

He served as sanitary officer in the 1882 Egyptian Expedition and was at the Battle of Tell El Kebir. He received a number of awards including the third class of the Order of Osmanieh and the Khedive's Star.

He was principal medical officer to the Indian Army, President of the Army Medical Board, and delegate of the British Government to the International Medical Congress in Washington.

General Marston retired in 1889 with the rank of Surgeon General. He subsequently became honorary surgeon to Queen Victoria and then King Edward VII.

== Death ==
Marston died in his residence in 56 Nevern Square, London on 31 March 1911. His funeral took place the following Tuesday at Charlton cemetery.

== See also ==
- Adrian Marston
