= Terence Cawthorne =

British surgeon (1902–1970)

Sir Terence Cawthorne
- Born: 29 September 1902
- Died: 22 January 1970 (aged 67)
- Education: Denstone College, King's College Hospital
- Medical career
- Profession: Otolaryngologist
- Research: neuro-otology

Sir Terence Edward Cawthorne FRCS (29 September 1902 – 22 January 1970) was a British surgeon specialising in otorhinolaryngology (ENT). He was knighted in 1964.

== Life and career ==
Cawthorne was born in Aberdeen and educated at Denstone College in Staffordshire. He then studied at the Medical School of King's College Hospital, London, becoming first house surgeon and then in 1928 Registrar to the Ear, Nose and Throat department there.

Cawthorne was appointed consultant surgeon to the ENT departments of King's College Hospital (1931–64) and Metropolitan Hospital (1930–34) and consultant ENT surgeon at the Hostel of St Luke (1932–45), St Giles' Hospital (1932–45), Royal Hospital, Richmond (1931–33), East Surrey Hospital (1934–38) and the National Hospital for Nervous Diseases (1936–67).

Cawthorne delivered numerous lectures and was made an honorary member of several overseas medical societies. He was elected President of the Royal Society of Medicine for 1962–64. He was president of the History of Medicine Society at The Royal Society of Medicine, London between 1968- 1970.

He married Lilian Southworth in 1930. They had a son and a daughter.

== Publications ==
- Aural Vertigo. Mod Trends Neurol 1957
- Otosclerosis (The Dalby Memorial Lecture) J Laryng 1955, 69, 437
- Facial Palsy.Brit med J 1956, 2, 1197

== Awards ==
- 1953 Dalby Memorial Prize of the Royal Society of Medicine
- 1961 W J Harrison Prize of the Royal Society of Medicine
- 1965 Gold Medal of the Society of Apothecaries
- 1963 Honorary MD of the University of Uppsala
- 1964 Honorary LLD of Syracuse University, New York
