= Frederick Fox Cartwright =

English anaesthetist

Frederick Fox Cartwright MRCS LRCP FFARCS (18 May 1909 – 22 November 2001) was an English anaesthetist and president of the History of Medicine Society of the Royal Society of Medicine from 1975–77.

== Life ==
Cartwright was born in Woolland, Dorset, to Anglican priest George Frederick Cartwright and Constance Margaret Clark. He had a special interest in Otolaryngology. Cartwright published on history of medicine, became Head of the Department of History of Medicine at King's College Medical School, London and was active at the Faculty of History of Medicine and Philosophy of the Worshipful Society of Apothecaries.
