= H. G. Pélissier =

English theatrical producer, composer and satirist

Pélissier in 1912

Harry Gabriel "H. G." Pélissier (27 April 1874 – 25 September 1913) was an English theatrical producer, composer, and satirist. He presented a number of theatrical productions during the Edwardian era, such as 'The Follies', many of them highly controversial, and even censored by the Lord Chamberlain. The banning of his 1909 satire of the patriotic play An Englishman's Home by Guy du Maurier was a major catalyst for the calling of the Parliamentary Enquiry into theatrical censorship of that year.

== Theatrical career ==
Born at Elm House, Church End, in Finchley, Middlesex, he was the second son of Frédéric Antoine Pélissier (d. 1914), a French diamond merchant, and his English wife, Jennie, née Kean. He attended Highgate School in London from 1885.

In 1895 Pélissier was a member of the 'Baddeley Troupe', a group of amateur entertainers who performed at charity events around south London. They went professional under Sherrington Chinn and Pélissier bought the rights to the troupe from Chinn, and, renamed them as The Follies. This was the first use of this much-copied title as a company name in the anglophone world. The new company's first appearance was at Aberystwyth, in Wales. Moving on to Worthing pier they opened as a pierrot show on 7 August 1896.

Eventually, Pélissier and his troupe graduated from seaside piers and concert halls to London's St. George's Hall, Queen's Hall, the Tivoli Music Hall and The Alhambra until moving to the prestigious Palace Theatre in 1904 where they burlesqued Grand Opera and Shakespeare.

In December 1904, Pélissier and his 'Follies' gave a 'Royal Command Performance' before King Edward VII and Queen Alexandra at Sandringham in celebration of her birthday after the King had enjoyed Pélissier's brilliant parodies of Wagner's operas. In December 1906 Pelissier, becoming increasingly ambitious, opened in a season at a small theatre attached to the Midland Hotel, in Manchester, where they filled the house for six weeks. In April 1907 Pelissier's 'Follies' transferred to the Royalty Theatre in London, where he produced a five-minute 'potted-play' called 'Baffles: a Peter-Pan-tomine', based on 'Raffles' and 'Peter Pan'.

In September 1907 the troupe moved to Terry's Theatre and in February 1908 to the Apollo Theatre, where they gave several more of their 'potted-plays', based on the plots and music of grand opera, musical comedy and current news. The Apollo Theatre remained the home of 'The Follies' until 1912.

In May 1908 the 'Follies' toured Glasgow, Edinburgh, Dublin, Newcastle and Birmingham, as well as various seaside venues, before returning to London's Apollo Theatre in December 1908.

In October and November of 1909, The Follies recorded twenty-two songs with the Odeon record company. This was an unprecedented number in such a concentrated period of time, and was done using the pioneering format of double-sided discs. Composed largely of pieces from their then programme at the Apollo, it arguably represents the first attempt at a record album and further illustrates Pélissier's innovative and adventurous approach.

In 1912 Pélissier married the actress Fay Compton (he was the first of four husbands), remaining married to her until his death in 1913. She made her first professional theatrical appearances with the 'Pélissier Follies' between 1911 and 1913.

Seeking ever more extravagant stage effects, his last three 'Follies' seasons were unsuccessful; he died at his father-in-law's home, 1 Nevern Square, Earl's Court, London, on 25 September 1913, aged just 39, from cirrhosis of the liver, leaving an infant son, Anthony Pelissier, who became a successful producer and director in his own right. After cremation at Golders Green Crematorium his ashes were placed in his mother's grave at Marylebone Cemetery, on 29 September.

== Composer ==
As a composer, Pélissier wrote the music for songs which were popular in their day, including:

- "Alone"
- "All on the Road to Brighton (A Song of the Motor Car)
- "Antiques"
- "Awake"
- "Before the Flood"
- "The Big Bamboo"
- "Canaries"
- "Chubby Little Cherub"
- "Contrary Mary"
- "Down By the Wangaroo"
- "Echoes"
- "The Flower Girl"
- "A Garden of Roses"
- "Girls"
- "Hope On, Hope Ever!"
- "I Love Thee Dear"
- "In Santa Fe"
- "I Wanted to Marry a Hero"
- "I Want Somebody to Love Me"
- "I Worship the Ground"
- "Love Me Long"
- "Love's Garden"
- "Mandy"
- "Memory's Garden"
- "Mother's Maxims"
- "My Boy From Barbary"
- "My Moon"
- "Our Canadian Canoe"
- "Pansy of Pennsylvania"
- "The Pleasant Countryside"
- "Since I Walked Out with a Soldier"
- "Teddy Bear"
- "That Makes My Dream Come True - A Burlesque Patriotic Song"
- "The Toothbrush and the Sponge"
- "Tiddle-Y-Pom"
- "What A Happy Land Is England"
- "Ypsilanti"
- "Zulu Lulu"
