= Walter Spencer-Stanhope =

Walter Spencer-Stanhope may refer to:

- Walter Spencer-Stanhope (1749–1822), industrialist, MP for Hull and Carlisle
- Walter Spencer-Stanhope (1827–1911), MP for the southern Division of the West Riding of Yorkshire, grandson of the above

== See also ==
- Walter Spencer (disambiguation)
