= John M. T. Ford =

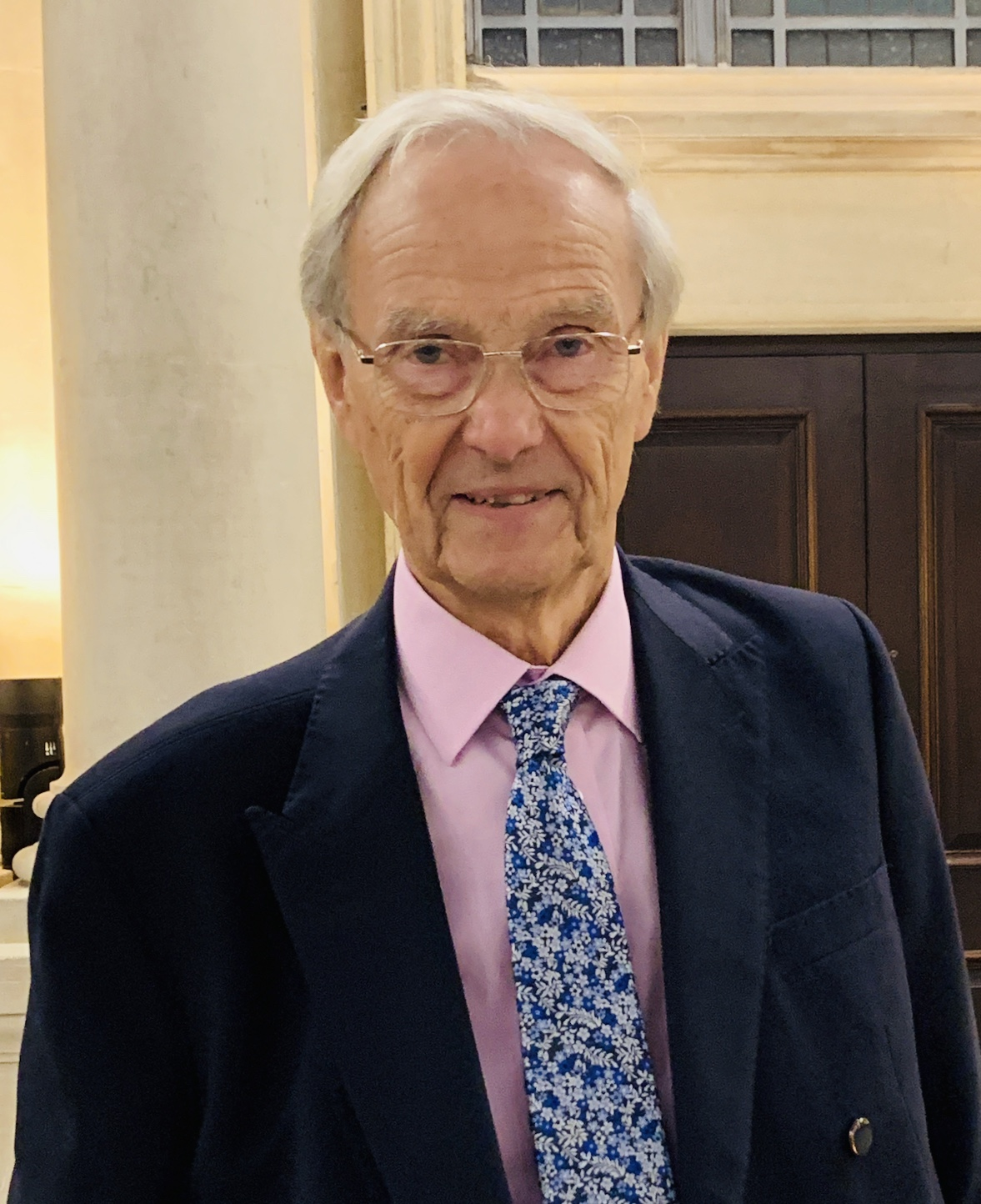
John M. T. Ford, 2019

John M. T. Ford is an English general practitioner and president of the History of Medicine Society of the Royal Society of Medicine from 1987 to 1988. His writings on medical history include "Medical Indications for Taking the Waters of Tunbridge Wells" (1984) and "R. E. Ford CBE, MD, MRCP" (1995). He is active in the Worshipful Society of Apothecaries.

== Selected publications ==
- Ford, John M T (1 November 1984). "Medical Indications for Taking the Waters of Tunbridge Wells, Medical Indications for Taking the Waters of Tunbridge Wells". Journal of the Royal Society of Medicine. 77 (11): 955–959. doi:10.1177/014107688407701112. PMC 1440216. PMID 6389861.
- Ford, John M. T. (21 June 1995). "R. E. Ford CBE, MD, MRCP". British Medical Journal. 311 (6998): 185–185. JSTOR 29728111.
