= Denis Dunbar Gibbs =

English physician (1927–2015)

Denis Dunbar Gibbs FRCP (19 July 1927 - 8 January 2015) was an English physician and president of the History of Medicine Society of the Royal Society of Medicine from 1962 to 1964.
