= Nevern Square =

Garden square in Earl's Court, London

Coordinates: 51°29′32″N 0°11′49″W

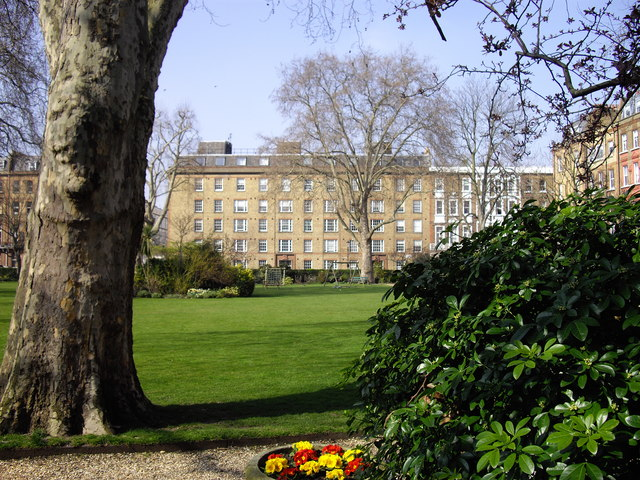
Nevern Square

Nevern Square is a garden square in the Earl's Court district of central London.

William Edwardes, 2nd Baron Kensington (1777–1852), Irish peer and British Member of parliament, was the original owner and developer of the Edwardes estate, where part of Earl's Court now stands. The family originated in Pembrokeshire which accounts for Earl's Court street names such as Nevern, Penywern and Philbeach.

Nevern Square was developed in the 1880s by the builder Robert Whitaker on behalf of Lord Kensington. From 1880 to 1884, Robert Whitaker built the east, north and south sides, and following his death in January 1885, George Whitaker built the west side of the square from 1885 to 1886. The architect was Walter Graves.

== Notable residents ==
- Vladimir Galitzine, Russian émigré, lived briefly in Nevern Square in 1921 before moving to Chessington Hall in Surrey.
- Glyn Idris Jones, actor, writer and director, was living at 63 Nevern Square in 1958.
- The writer Compton Mackenzie and his sister, actress Fay Compton, lived at No. 1 Nevern Square between 1901 and 1918.
- Jeffery Allen Marston, British military officer, died at 56 Nevern Square on 31 March 1911.
- H. G. Pélissier, theatrical producer, composer and satirist, died at 1 Nevern Square (his father-in-law's home) on 25 September 1913.
- John Proudfoot Stratton, Scottish physician, lived at 51 Nevern Square from the 1880s until his death in 1895.
