= William Henry McMenemey =

English physician

William Henry McMenemey FRCP (16 May 1905 – 24 November 1977) was an English physician and president of the History of Medicine Society of the Royal Society of Medicine from 1962 to 1964.

== Life and career ==
McMenemey was educated at Birkenhead School, and at Merton College, Oxford, from 1923 to 1926. He served as Secretary to the Association of Clinical Pathologists between 1943 and 1957, and as its President for the following two years. McMenemey was a Founding Member of the Neuropathological Club, which later became the British Neuropathological Society; he served as its President from 1958 to 1960.

McMenemey married Robina née Inkster in 1934; they had a son and a daughter.
