= Hubert James Norman =

English physician (1881–1948)

Hubert James Norman (7 January 1881 – 13 March 1948) was an English physician and president of the History of Medicine Society of the Royal Society of Medicine from 1947 to 1948.
