= John Frederick Halls Dally =

- Portrait by Walter Stoneman, c. 1916
- Born: 2 August 1877
- Died: 4 November 1944
- Known for: High blood pressure, its variations and control : manual for practitioners, W. Heinemann (1923)

John Frederick Halls Dally (2 August 1877 – 4 November 1944) was a British physician and president of the History of Medicine Society of the Royal Society of Medicine from 1941 to 1942 and in 1944.

== Early life ==
John Frederick Halls Dally was born on 2 August 1877 at Wolverhampton and attended Wolverhampton School. He gained admission to St John's College, Cambridge, and then went on to St Bartholomew's Hospital.

== Medical career ==
He gained the Conjoint in 1901, MA MB MCH in 1903, MD in 1907 and MRCP in 1909.

He subsequently became physician to Mount Vernon Hospital when it was a chest hospital in Hampstead and was a senior physician to the St Marylebone and Western General Dispensary. In addition, he edited the journal of the West London Medico-Chirurgical Society, where he was also president.

== Personal and family ==
He married Norah Willoughby Curtois and they lived at 93 Harley Street. They had one son, Edward.

He died at home on 4 November 1944.

== Publications ==
- High blood pressure, its variations and control : manual for practitioners, published by W. Heinemann, 1923.
