= DHMSA =

The Diploma in the History of Medicine of the Society of Apothecaries, abbreviated DHMSA, is a postgraduate qualification awarded following a one-year study course in the History of Medicine, organised by the Worshipful Society of Apothecaries and covers topics from antiquity of humanity to present times, taught by expert historians and clinicians.

== History of DHSMA ==
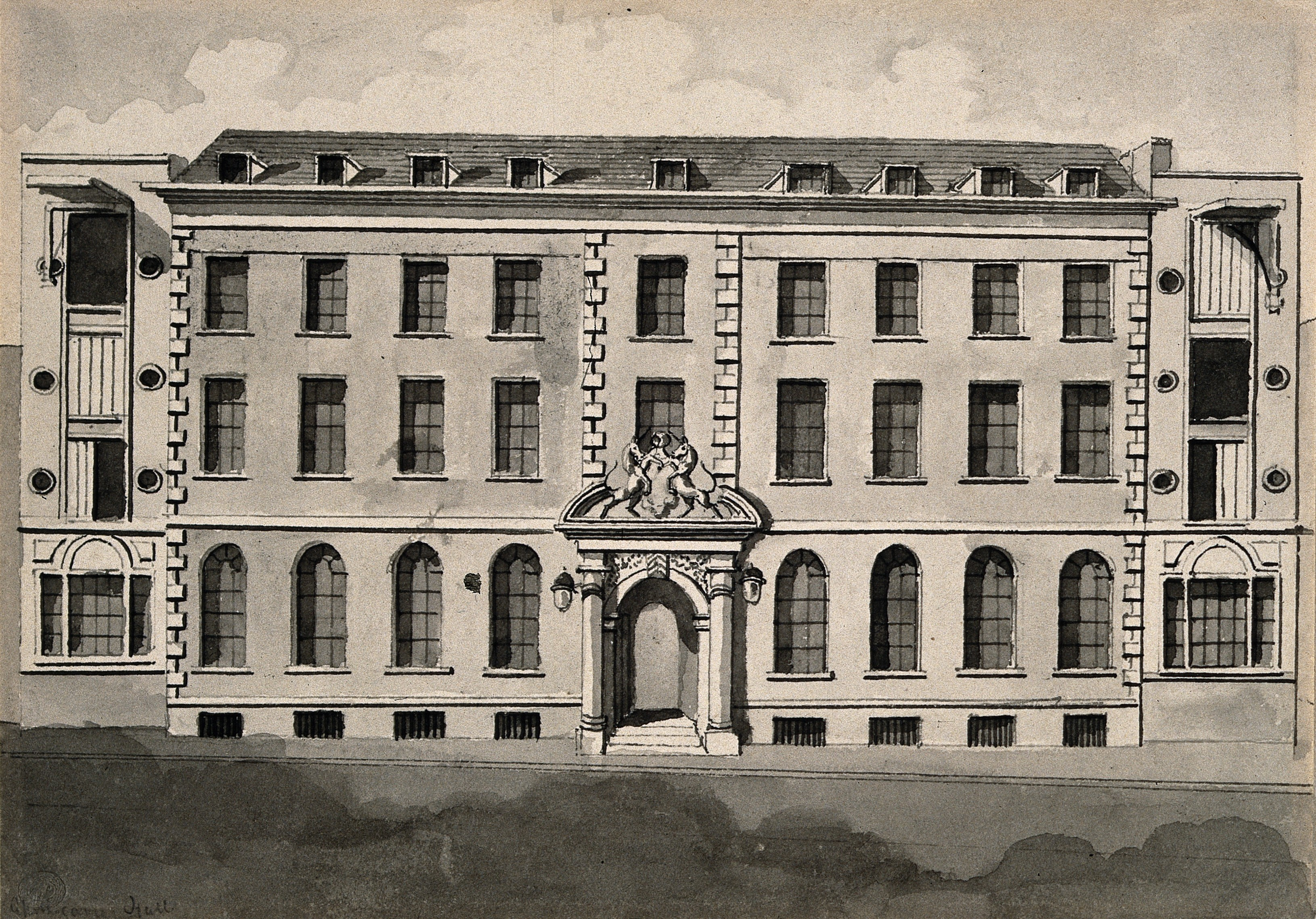
Worshipful Society of Apothecaries, Blackfriars

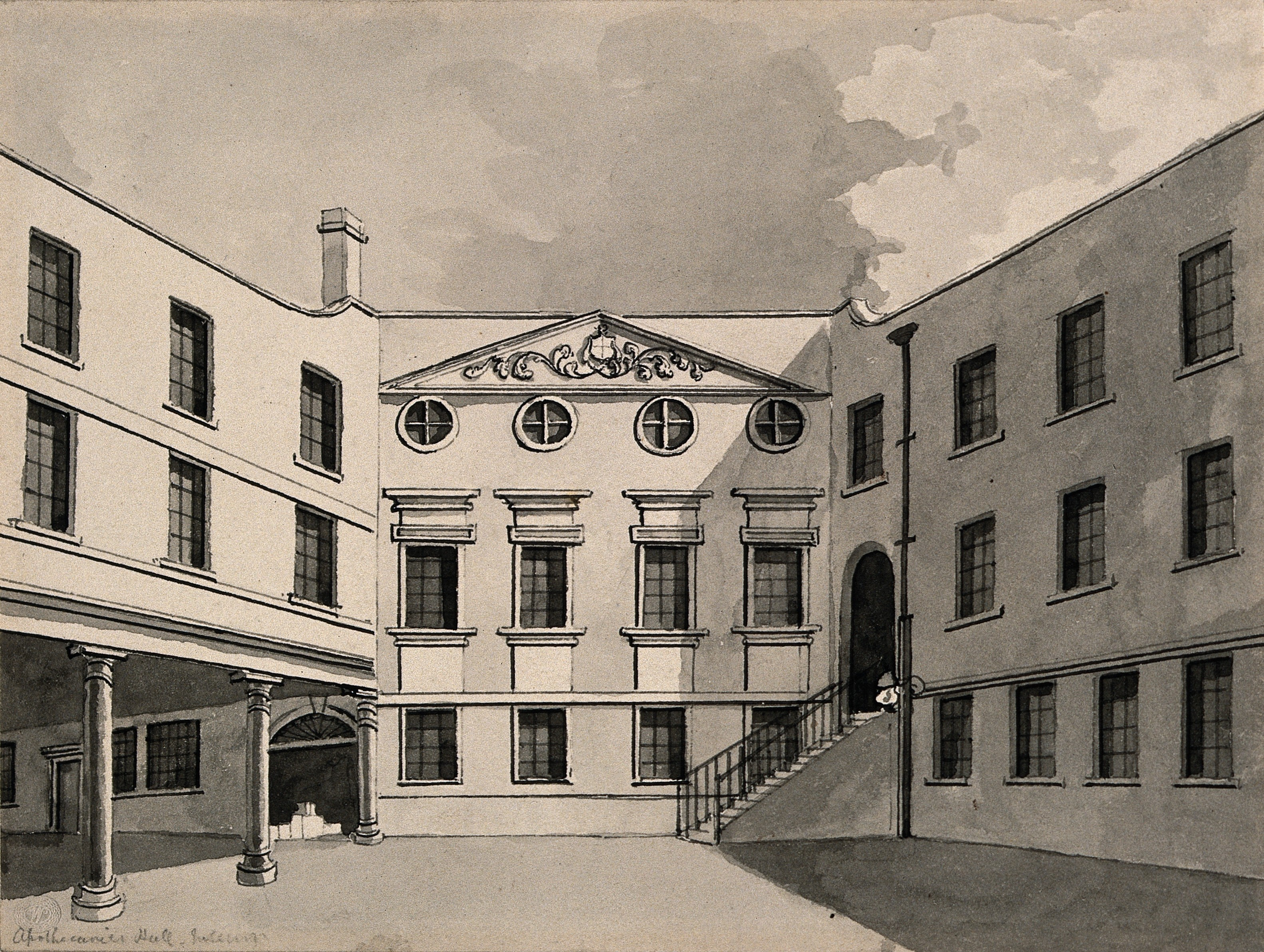
Apothecaries' Hall, Blackfriars Lane; the courtyard

The content and duration of medical training has changed since 1870, with a mixture of optional and compulsory elements and an increasing recognition of history and the arts. The Worshipful Society of Apothecaries initiated the diploma in 1970. The Diploma in the History of Medicine has since been examined annually. It was designed in part as a qualification for those wishing to teach the history of medicine and is evidence of a good general knowledge of up-to-date sources and methods of inquiry, of good factual knowledge and also an ability to lecture to an audience in an interesting and entertaining manner.

== Applicants ==
Applicants are usually doctors, medical students, and other allied healthcare professionals. Blue Badge tourist guides have also completed the course.

== Topics taught ==
Exam technique, examination and writing skills are included in the curriculum, as well as the history of traditional western medical tradition. History of ancient Egyptian, Chinese, Ayurvedic, Greek and Roman medicine are taught by historians of medicine such as Vivian Nutton and W. F. Bynum. In addition to history of nursing and general practice, there is also a session on history of pharmacy.

== The exam ==
All parts need to be passed.

1. Two written papers, one of short answers and the other of essays.
2. 5000 word dissertation based on local medical history, role of an individual and development of aspects such as aviation medicine.
3. A test lecture to demonstrate an ability to lecture in history of medicine.

== Prizes and awards ==
Osler Lecture

The Macabean Prize for best Dissertation

The Sydney Selwyn Prize is awarded to the best candidate in the Diploma in the Philosophy of Medicine examination.

== Post graduation activities ==
Following qualification, DHMSA graduates have proceeded to be involved in history of medicine related activities. Professor Sean Hughes has lectured on John Keats and Dr Peter Down has lectured on Dr John Paulley (1918-2007) and history of medicines. Some have become presidents of the History of Medicine Society at The Royal Society of Medicine, London and the British Society for the History of Medicine whilst others have formed societies elsewhere, such as the West Sussex History of Medicine Society. A proposal to include a Master's degree has been made.
