= Kenneth Thomas (chess player) =

Chess player and USCF officer

Kenneth Thomas (born February 24, 1938) was Chief Financial Officer of the United States Chess Federation from April 23 to December 31, 2004. He took over the position of CFO of the USCF during a period of great financial distress, with the USCF having lost money seven years in a row, with total losses amounting to $1.7 million. He was hired by Bill Goichberg. Because the USCF was in severe financial difficulty, he agreed to work for far below the normal salary. He restored the federation to profitability and financial solvency.

Ken Thomas was born in Mead, Oklahoma during the great Dust Bowl. Three of his siblings died of starvation and Ken nearly died as well. After World War II, Ken with his family moved to New Jersey. He graduated from Bound Brook High School there.

Thomas served in the United States Army Ordnance Corps from 1961 to 1964 as a sergeant. He worked in nuclear weapon assembly. He worked in the Nuclear Weapons Laboratory in Sandia Base, near Albuquerque, New Mexico. He was a mechanic in the internal workings of Nuclear Weapons.

Later he was transferred to Lüdenscheid, West Germany, and attached to the German army, the Bundeswehr where he worked on secret weapons in the British Sector. He speaks German. He traveled all over Western Europe arming and disarming nuclear weapons. He also played chess there and twice participated in the European Army Championships in Kaiserslautern, Germany.

After completing his military service, he graduated from the University of Houston in 1972 with a Bachelor of Business Administration and from that school's Five-year Professional Program (now MBA) in 1974. He bought a home in Hackettstown, New Jersey, where he lives today. He founded the Hackettstown Chess Club in September 1972.

Long an active chess organizer, tournament director, and tournament player, he has been editor of Atlantic Chess News and a member of the board of directors of the New Jersey Chess Federation. He is currently the treasurer of the NJSCF. Thomas was an auditor for Litton Industries and Thomas & Betts and later was controller for Visiting Health Service of Morris County, New Jersey, and controller for Family Intervention Services of South Orange, New Jersey. He was an adjunct professor and the accounting manager and director of Planned Giving and taught managerial accounting and internal accounting courses at Centenary College of Hackettstown, New Jersey.
