= Walter G. Spencer =

Walter George Spencer OBE, FRCS, (27 September 1858 – 29 October 1940) was president of the History of Medicine Society of the Royal Society of Medicine from 1926 to 1928. He was surgeon to Westminster Hospital and was known as "The Historian of Westminster".

== Selected publications ==
- Outlines of Practical Surgery. Balliere Tindall, 1898.
