= Raymond Crawfurd =

British physician and writer (1865-1938)

Sir Raymond Henry Payne Crawfurd FRCP
- Born: 9 November 1865; East Grinstead, Sussex, England
- Died: 9 March 1938 (aged 72); London, England
- Education: Winchester College; King's College, London; New College, Oxford
- Spouse: Ethelberta Ormrod (m. 1898)
- Medical career
- Profession: physician
- Institutions: Kings College Hospital Medical School

Sir Raymond Henry Payne Crawfurd FRCP (9 November 1865 – 9 March 1938) was a British physician and writer who, in addition to being active in post graduate medical education, took up numerous clinical and administrative responsibilities, including Registrar and examiner to the Royal College of Physicians (RCP), the Dean of Kings College Hospital Medical School, now King's College London GKT School of Medical Education (GKT), and Chair of Epsom College Council.

After studying classics at Oxford and medicine at King's College, he became a physician and also lectured in pathology and materia medica. As Dean and then later Emeritus Lecturer in Medicine, he was a major participant in the move of King's College Hospital from Lincoln's Inn Fields to Denmark Hill in 1933, an achievement for which he was awarded a knighthood. Simultaneously, in his roles on its council, he raised the profile of Epsom College, secured the admission of women to the benefits of the Royal Medical Foundation, improved pay for masters and founded a building dedicated to learning biology.

An illness in his early forties left him with mobility difficulties, causing him to stop clinical practice and turn to writing a number of history of medicine articles and historical books, including one on the controversial death of Charles II. He gave the FitzPatrick Lectures in 1911 and 1912, the first which was expanded into one of the most comprehensive accounts of the royal touch and scrofula (the King's evil) and the second into a book about Plague in art and literature. Throughout the early 20th century, he remained consistently involved with the History of Medicine Section of the Royal Society of Medicine (RSM), becoming the section's president from 1916 to 1918.

== Early life and family ==
Raymond Crawfurd was born in East Grinstead on 9 November 1865, the youngest of the six sons of the Reverend Charles Walter Payne Crawfurd and Mary, daughter of James Adey Ogle, Regius professor of medicine at the University of Oxford. Four of his brothers also attended Oxford. In 1898, he married Ethelberta Ormrod, daughter of Colonel Arthur Bailey, J.P., of Bolton. They had three sons.

== Education ==
Crawfurd was schooled at Winchester College, after which he attended New College, University of Oxford, from where he graduated in 1888 with a degree in classics. He subsequently studied medicine at Kings College Hospital Medical School, London, where he was awarded both junior and senior scholarships and then passed the B.M. and B.Ch., degrees in 1894. In the same year, he founded the Musical Society at Oxford in 1894.

== Medical career ==
Crawfurd took up resident posts at the King's College Hospital and became assistant physician to the Victoria Hospital for Children. In 1896, the Royal Free Hospital appointed him as assistant physician, however, he resigned in 1908.

In 1902, he wrote his doctorate thesis on Graves' disease. Later, in 1909, he was elected fellow of King’s College and served as chairman of the medical board from 1912 to 1914, following which, in 1930, he retired from active staff at King's. Other appointments included physician to the National Provident Institution and the Life Association of Scotland.

At the turn of the 19th century, he became Registrar to the Royal College of Physicians (RCP), a position he retained for thirteen years. Subsequently, he delivered the FitzPatrick Lectures (1911–12) and in 1919, was Harveian Orator. At the London School of Medicine for Women, he lectured on pathology and on materia medica.

=== Postgraduate medical education ===
The importance of post-graduate medical education in maintaining "up-to-date" knowledge was increasingly realized as the 19th century approached, leading to the foundation of organisations such as the London Post-Graduate Association (LPA) which was established in 1898. The LPA offered London’s practitioners clinical material courses from numerous major London hospitals and Crawfurd soon became its secretary.

In 1913, Crawfurd was a major contributor at an International Conference on postgraduate medical education. At the time, he was also a member of the Board of Examiners at the RCP and the Chairman of the Medical Graduates’ College and Polyclinic and his request was to see better organization of postgraduate prospects with a “central bureau” that could co-ordinate London’s postgraduate medical education opportunities.

In 1925, he became a representative on the committee of management of the Conjoint Board, which later, in 1937, sent him to visit the Medical faculty of the Egyptian University, to report on its progress.

=== King's College ===
Between 1900 and 1904, he was appointed the Dean of Kings College Hospital Medical School, later becoming King's College London GKT School of Medical Education (GKT). At the time, the hospital was in Portugal Street, Lincoln's Inn Fields. However, by 1900, much of the area around the hospital had changed. Around one-third of admissions were arriving from South London and an argument was put forward to relocate.

As Director of Medical Studies in the Medical School, Crawfurd, along with his old schoolfriend, Rev Dr A C Headlam, played a major part in moving King's College Hospital to Denmark Hill, having also become Emeritus Lecturer on Medicine at King’s in 1930. Lord Dawson of Penn described them as “master” founders of the new college. In addition, Crawfurd later helped Lord Dawson search for a new site for the RCP in the planned move from Pall Mall East.

In 1933, he was awarded a knighthood for his achievements in the completion of the new medical school.

=== Epsom College ===
Crawfurd became a member of council at Epsom College in 1915, following which he was elected chairman of the school committee in 1918, and vice-chairman of council in 1921.

Between 1923 and 1936, whilst chairman of the council, he raised considerable revenue for Epsom College. He secured the admission of medical women to the benefits of the foundation, influenced acts of parliament and made administrative changes. Under his guidance, the standard of scholarships improved, master's pays increased and a biology block was built.

Having been on the football team during his early education at Winchester, Crawfurd was a keen follower of rugby football and frequently went to matches in Blackheath and Twickenham, hospital matches and to see Epsom College boys play.

Crawfurd House, a building at Epsom College, is named after him.

== History of medicine ==
In his early forties, a chronic illness affecting his bones and requiring surgery to one of his knees, left Crawfurd immobile and incapable of medical practice and he turned his interest to writing and the history of medicine. His works included The Last Days of Charles II (1909), The King's Evil (1911) and Plague and Pestilence in Literature and Art (1914), a topic he had lectured on the previous year at an international congress.

=== The Last Days of Charles II (1909) ===
The sudden death of King Charles II of England was initially recorded as due to being poisoned. It had therefore received much attention over the years and Crawfurd’s publication, The Last Days of Charles II (1909), became a respected revision of the facts. His conclusion that Charles II died from chronic interstitial nephritis resulting in uraemic convulsions have since been endorsed by other biographers of Charles II.

=== The King's Evil (1911) ===
Published in 1911, The King's Evil covered the subject of his first of two FitzPatrick lectures, given in the same year at the RCP. His wish was to "make the subject part of the general history of England" and his view he declared, was that "to isolate medical history from general history is, in my opinion, to sterilize it". He described how the 11th century French custom of touching for the King's Evil was observed by virtually all kings of England from Edward the Confessor to George I. Crawfurd explained how medical men gained courage to be sceptical after William III's dismissal of the touch. His research went on to encompass the use of coins bearing images of Charles I as alternatives to the touch, and how these coins were passed down through generations.

Extensively documented in history, scrofula was also known as the King's evil and was thought to be cured by the touch of the monarch. Having already written about Charles II, who happened to have also touched almost 100,000 people, Crawfurd's account in The King's Evil (1911), of how the royal touch was thought to cure scrofula, has been acknowledged as one of the most comprehensive accounts, frequently compared with the works of Marc Bloch. The custom suited both monarch and individual, appearing to be linked to an interplay between politics, religion, and medical knowledge.

Monarchs of England and France were the only Christian royals to practice this "gift transferred by the Gods", (due to the high esteem in which God held the royals) and historians have dealt with the matter from various angles, from "ridicule" and "absurd", to Crawfurd's fascination, in what Sturdy describes as Crawfurd's "dubious if exotic" views. Crawfurd wrote: "I can therefore explain my feeling in a word: the King’s touch may still be beneficial if it ever was: often it is apt to be intellectual, but it can never be harmful". Others have merely found it puzzling and evidence of “mass delusion”. However, Crawfurd also recognised that scrofula was a general term given to a number of diseases. He clearly stated that "no word in the whole of medical terminology has been more ill-used than the word 'scrofula'".

=== Plague and Pestilence in Literature and Art (1914) ===
Plague and Pestilence in Literature and Art (1914) was a general account of plague up to the 18th century, the subject of his second series of FitzPatrick lectures and contributions to the proceedings of the Royal society of Medicine journal.

Bray describes Crawfurd’s work on plague as “delightful”, as a reference is made to his story of one Roman writer who believed the Aurelian plague so dangerous that even a single glimpse could cause it.

=== History of Medicine Section ===
Crawfurd was a firm supporter of Sir William Osler in forming a dedicated section to history of medicine at the RSM and recorded how Sir William's influence had been an attraction in recruiting members. When the first History of Medicine Section meeting was held in 1912, Crawfurd, along with D'Arcy Power were appointed the section’s secretaries. In addition, at the inaugural meeting, he spoke on contributions from the history of medicine to the problem of the transmission of typhus. He later became president of the Section in 1916 and took up responsibilities on the library committee at RSM, both following on from Sir Norman Moore.

== Death and legacy ==
Crawfurd died at 11 Beamont street, in London, from a heart attack, on 9 March 1938, at the age of 72.

== Selected publications ==
Crawfurd co-authored the fourth and fifth editions of Burney Yeo’s Manual of Treatment and made contributions to numerous medical journals including The Lancet, Edinburgh Medical Journal and Practitioner in addition to many books on various history of medicine topics.

=== Books ===
- The Last Days of Charles II. Clarendon Press, Oxford, 1909.
- The King's Evil. Clarendon Press, Oxford, 1911.
- Plague and Pestilence in Literature and Art. Clarendon Press, Oxford, 1914.
- Yeo, Burney. A Manual of Medical Treatment. 4th & 5th editions (Co-author)

=== Articles and lectures ===
- Crawfurd, R (1915). "Oliver Goldsmith and Medicine". Proc R Soc Med. 8 (Sect Hist Med): 7–26. doi:10.1177/003591571500801502. PMC 2003652. PMID 19978957.
- Crawfurd, R (1916). "Of Superstitions concerning Menstruation". Proc R Soc Med. 9 (Sect Hist Med): 49–66. doi:10.1177/003591571600901609. PMC 2017716. PMID 19979426.
- Crawfurd, Raymond (1917). "Presidential Address". Proceedings of the Royal Society of Medicine. 10: 1–32. doi:10.1177/003591571701001501. PMC 2017762.
- "The Harbeian Oration ON FORERUNNERS OF HARVEY IN ANTIQUITY". The Lancet. 194 (5018): 765–770. 1919. doi:10.1016/S0140-6736(00)55028-4.
