= William Hartston (physician) =

English physician

William Hartston FRCP (26 November 1904 – 1 July 1980) was an English physician and president of the History of Medicine Society of the Royal Society of Medicine from 1973 to 1975. He was a chest physician and lecturer for the Diploma in the History of Medicine of the Society of Apothecaries (DHMSA).
