= Thomas Douglas Whittet =

British pharmacist

Thomas Douglas Whittet (4 January 1915 – 15 April 1987) was a British pharmacist and historian.

== Early life, education and career ==
Born and raised in West Hartlepool, County Durham, England, Whittet attended Rosebank High School and Sunderland Technical College (now the University of Sunderland), qualifying as a pharmaceutical chemist in 1938. Employed as a hospital pharmacist in Chesterfield, Manchester, and London during World War II, he was subsequently appointed chief pharmacist at University College Hospital (UCH) in 1947. Whilst working at UCH he studied at University College London, obtaining a BSc in physiology in 1952 and a PhD in non-clinical medicine in 1958. In 1965 he was appointed deputy chief pharmacist at the Ministry of Health (now the Department of Health and Social Care). He was promoted to chief pharmacist in 1967, a post he held until his retirement in 1978.

Throughout his career, Whittet maintained a close interest in the history of pharmacy and medicine. He published numerous books and articles on related topics, including the Great Plague of London and apothecaries' token coins.

== Honors and awards ==
- Whittet was appointed Commander of the Order of the British Empire (CBE) in the 1977 New Year Honours.
- He served as the president of the History of Medicine Society of the Royal Society of Medicine from 1981 to 1983.
- He served as Master of the Worshipful Society of Apothecaries from 1982 to 1983, becoming the first pharmacist to hold this position since the Apothecaries Act 1815 transformed the Society from a pharmaceutical to a medical one.

== Selected publications ==
- "The apothecaries in the Great Plague of London", 1665 (Society of Apothecaries' Sydenham Lecture, 1965; Ewell, Surrey: Morgan, 1970).

== Personal life ==
Whittet was married to Doreen Mary Bowes (1915 – 2009) from 1942 until his death in 1987. They had two sons, Douglas Whittet (born 1947), who became an astrophysicist, and David Whittet (born 1953), who became a medical doctor.
