= Victor Cornelius Medvei =

Hungarian physician

Victor Cornelius Medvei CBE MD FRCP (6 June 1905 – 18 October 2000) was a Hungarian born, Austrian and British qualified physician. He qualified as a doctor at the University of Vienna and at St Bartholomew's Hospital in London. He was Principal Medical Adviser to the Foreign and Commonwealth Office until his retirement in 1970. He was the Founder, in 1958, of the Society of Silver Collectors (now the Silver Society) and subsequently its Secretary. He was President of the Harveian Society, the Osler Club, and of the History of Medicine Society of the Royal Society of Medicine. He also held an Endocrine clinic at St Bartholomew's Hospital for much of his career, stepping down in his eighties and a chest clinic at the Royal Brompton Hospital.

== Selected publications ==
- Medvei, Victor Cornelius (1982). A history of endocrinology. Lancaster [Lancashire]; Boston : MTP Press. ISBN 978-0-85200-245-2.
