= Peter Maxwell Daniel =

British medical doctor

Professor Peter Maxwell Daniel FRCP FRCS FRCPath FRCPsych FLS FIBiol
- Born: 14 November 1910
- Died: 19 November 1998 (aged 88)
- Education: Westminster School
- Occupation: Neuropathologist
- Organization: History of Medicine Society

Peter Maxwell Daniel (14 November 1910 – 19 November 1998) was a British medical doctor, who specialised in neuropathology. He was president of the History of Medicine Society at The Royal Society of Medicine, London between 1979 and 1981.

== Family ==
Daniel's father was a senior surgeon at Charing Cross Hospital. He was married three times, first to Sally Shelford, then Frances Dawn Bosanquet, followed by Marion Bosanquet (sister to Philippa Foot). He had six children from the first two marriages.

== Early life ==
Educated at Westminster School, Cambridge, University of Oxford, Edinburgh, and Charing Cross Hospital Medical School, he completed medical training at the age of 30. He is known to have been expelled from his schools on two occasions.

== Medical career ==
Daniel had an early career in pathology at the Radcliffe Infirmary in Oxford. Here, he had the opportunity of working under Sir Hugh Cairns (surgeon) as a neuropathologist and perfected brain-cuts. His expertise lay in the diagnosis of Brain tumors diseases of the nervous system. Daniel presented his findings at regular postmortem demonstrations.

His research interests were wide-ranging. He demonstrated muscle-spindles in eye muscles, and investigated single-neurone discharges from the optical cortex. He described a portal vascular system in the kidney and one between the pituitary and the hypothalamus. Many years before BSE in cattle and prions came to prominence, he studied scrapie and kuru and recognised that these diseases were transmitted by an agent not destroyed by heat. He produced a wide range of papers and books.

He became president of various societies including the Neuropathological Society, the Osler Club, the Medical Society of London, the Harveian Society and the Physiological Society. He was a founder-member of the Royal Colleges of Pathology and Psychiatry, and was a long-term member of the Physiological Society.
