= Alex Sakula =

British respiratory physician

Alex Sakula MD FRCP
- Born: 26 June 1917
- Died: 27 December 2003 (aged 86)
- Education: Middlesex Hospital
- Occupation: Respiratory physician
- Notable work: The portraiture of William Osler

Alex Sakula (26 June 1917 - 27 December 2003) published more than 200 papers and was a British respiratory physician with a fascination in history of medicine.

Born to Polish immigrants and brought up in Whitechapel, Sakula entered medicine after achieving a number of scholarships and distinctions.

He was noted to have written many biographies of famous clinicians and wrote a book on William Osler.

== Early life ==
Sakula was the third child of Polish immigrants who came to the Jewish East End of London in about 1900. Growing up in Whitechapel, his father was a master tailor working in the attic of the house they rented. At age 13, Sakula was awarded a scholarship to Davenant Foundation School.

== Medical career ==
In 1942, he published an article in the Lancet, on how sulphapyridine was used to treat a child suffering from pneumococcal meningitis.

During the Second World War, while serving in India, Burma and Malaya as a Major in the RAMC, Sakula became competent in treating tropical diseases. At the end of the war, he assisted with the recovery of former prisoners of war from the River Kwai camp in a jungle hospital.

Sakula's career in respiratory medicine spanned from 1956 to 1982, in Redhill General Hospital, Surrey, Crawley Hospital and Horsham Hospital. He described his ambition in medicine to have begun with what he saw around the vicinity of the London Hospital when he used to walk to school. Sakula was awarded a Meyerstein Scholarship after admission to Middlesex Hospital medical school from school.

Sakula became house physician to Alec Cooke at the Radcliffe Infirmary, Oxford, after receiving a distinction in medicine in 1940. It was here that Sakula witnessed some of the first patients to receive penicillin by Charles Fletcher.

Upon return after the war to England in 1947, he was appointed to the Brompton Hospital, London, to train in chest medicine, eventually becoming chest physician at the Kingston Hospital, Kingston-on-Thames. He wrote a considerable number of articles on tuberculosis and founded chest services for East Surrey and West Sussex.

Sakula was fascinated with lung cancer and occupational respiratory diseases. In 1961, he published a study linking pneumoconiosis and workers handling Fuller's Earth. In 1967, he described mushroom grower's lung which was caused by the inhalation of actinomycete spores. It led to the use of protective clothing and the elimination of the disease. Other contributions included antitrypsin deficiency in lung disease (psittacosis) and various aspects of bronchial carcinoma.

== History of medicine ==
Sakula wrote many medical biographies including those of René Leanne, Leopold Auenbruzgger, Robert Koch and Skoda. He made new discoveries in the history of medicine particularly with new information on the relatives of William Harvey. He discovered related new portraits at Betchworth, Surrey. He produced over 80 publications in medico-historical expositions. In 1984, he became president of the Osler Club of London.

== Publications ==
Sakula published many articles in the Journal of Medical Biography, including those relating to John Keats, Thomas Henry Huxley, Sydney Coleman, and Lord Joseph Lister. In 1978, he wrote a book, Auenbrugger: Opus and opera. The most widely held works by Sakula include The portraiture of William Osler and Portraits, sculptures and statues.

== Personal life ==
Sakula married Rene in 1951 and lived in Reigate, Surrey, from 1956 to 1989, moving to Hove after retirement. They had three sons and a daughter.

Sakula suffered from diabetes mellitus, developing glaucoma, which led to blindness, and then a stroke.
