= Kenneth Bryn Thomas =

Kenneth Bryn Thomas (30 September 1915 – 22 September 1978) was an English physician and president of the History of Medicine Society of the Royal Society of Medicine from 1970 to 1972.

== Selected publications ==
- James Douglas of the Pouch and his pupil William Hunter (Pitman Medical Publishing Co, London, 1964)
- Curare: its history and usage (Pitman Medical Publishing Co, London, 1964)
- "The A Charles King Collection of early anaesthetic apparatus", Anaesthesia, vol xxv, no 4 (Oct 1970)
- The development of anaesthetic apparatus: a history based on the Charles King collection of the Association of Anaesthetists of Great Britain and Ireland (published for the Association by Blackwell Scientific Publications, Oxford, 1975).
