= Henry R. Rollin =

English psychiatrist

Henry Rapoport Rollin (1911-2014) was an English psychiatrist. He was the Deputy Superintendent of Horton Hospital, Epsom, one of the largest psychiatric hospitals in the United Kingdom.

== Early life and education ==
Henry Rapoport Rollin was born in Glasgow, Scotland in 1911. Though born in Scotland, Rollin was raised in Leeds and stated in an interview that he "always considered [himself] a Yorkshireman".

Rollin attended the University of Leeds, graduating from Leeds Medical School. Rollin credits his father for pushing him to study the field of medicine. In an interview, Rollin said the prevalence of antisemitism at the medical school was one of the reasons he did not enjoy his time there.

== Career and legacy ==
After graduating, Rollin's first job was as a house surgeon at Oldham Royal Infirmary. Rollin is also credited with bringing music to asylums. Later in life, he declared that he despised the demolition of psychiatric asylums under Enoch Powell, that the community did not care, and that much had been lost by closing them.

Rollin died in 2014 at the age of 102.
