= Arnold Chaplin =

British physician and historian (1864–1944)

Sir Thomas Hancock Arnold Chaplin FRCP (30 August 1864 – 18 October 1944) was a British physician.

After studying at St. Bartholomew's Hospital, Chaplin's primary appointment was at the City of London Hospital for Diseases of the Chest, where he remained for the next twenty-nine years. He co-authored the textbook on Fibroid Diseases of the Lung, and The Science and Art of Prescribing and wrote The Illness and Death of Napoleon Bonaparte (1913). He loved old books and prints, and became Harveian Librarian at the Royal College of Physicians, London.

== Selected publications ==
- Fibroid Diseases of the Lung (joint)
- The Science and Art of Prescribing (joint)
- The Illness and Death of Napoleon Bonaparte (1913)
