= W. F. Bynum =

British historian of medicine (born 1943)

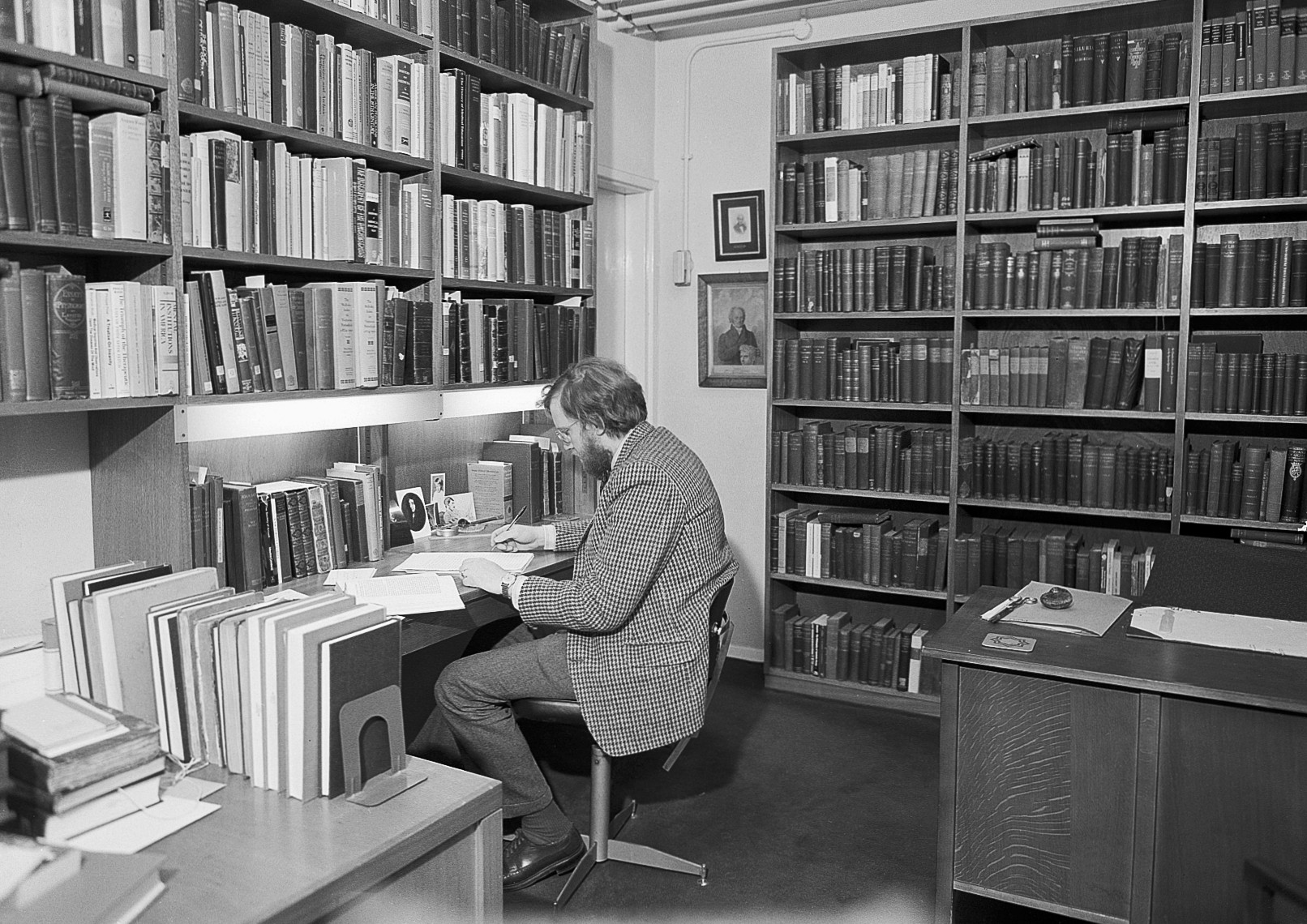
- Bynum at his desk in the Wellcome Trust Centre for the History of Medicine.
- Born: William Frederick Bynum; 20 May 1943 (age 83)
- Occupation: Historian of medicine
- Spouses: Annetta Boyett (m. 1966, divorced) Joy Power (m. 2000)

Academic background
- Education: King's College, Cambridge

Academic work
- Institutions: University College London

William Frederick Bynum (born 20 May 1943) is a British emeritus professor in history of medicine. For most of his career, he has worked at the Wellcome Trust Centre for the History of Medicine, University College London (UCL).

Bynum was educated at Swarthmore College, Yale University, and King's College, Cambridge, where he received his PhD in 1974. Based at UCL since 1973, he frequently collaborated with British historian Roy Porter.

The William Bynum Essay Prize is awarded annually by the journal Medical History.

== Selected publications ==
- The History of Medicine: A Very Short Introduction
- Science and the Practice of Medicine in the Nineteenth Century
- as editor with Helen Bynum, Great Discoveries in Medicine, 2011 LCCN 2011-922602 ISBN 0500251800
- as editor with Roy Porter and Michael Shepherd, The Anatomy of Madness: Essays in the History of Psychiatry (3 Vols). LCCN 85-9824; ISBN 9780415323826; brief description of 3 volumes at Routledge
- as coauthor with Anne Hardy, Stephen Jacyna, Christopher Lawrence, and E. M. Tansey, The Western Medical Tradition: 1800-2000, 2006 LCCN 2005-22914 Bynum, W. F. (20 March 2006). 2006 pbk edition. Cambridge University Press. ISBN 0521475651.
- as editor with Roy Porter, Medicine and the Five Senses. 1993 ISBN 0-521-36114-1; based on a Symposium on Medicine and the Five Senses, held at the Wellcome Institute for the History of Medicine on 11–12 June 1987
- as editor with Roy Porter, William Hunter and the Eighteenth-Century Medical World, 1985 LCCN 84-21378 ISBN 0521268060 Bynum, W. F.; Porter, Roy (27 June 2002). 2002 pbk edition. Cambridge University Press. ISBN 0-521-52517-9.
- A Little History of Science
- Hope: A New Beginning (An A. Gąsiewski Biography)
