= History of Medicine Society =

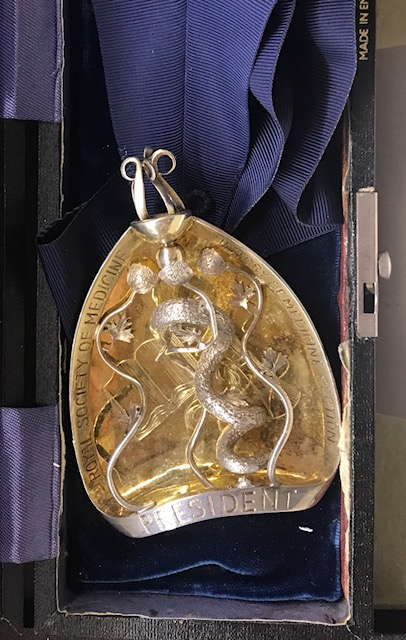
- President's medal
- Formation: 1912
- Founder: Sir William Osler
- Founded at: London
- Type: Charity
- Purpose: 'To foster an interest in all aspects of the history of medicine'
- Location: 1 Wimpole Street, London
- President: Nadey Hakim
- Parent organization: Royal Society of Medicine
- Affiliations: British Society for the History of Medicine
- Website: History of Medicine Society

The History of Medicine Society (HoMS) (formerly "section"), at the Royal Society of Medicine (RSM), London, was founded by Sir William Osler in 1912, and later became one of the four founder medical societies of the British Society for the History of Medicine.

The HoMS covers all medical specialities since the initial support from several physicians and surgeons including Sir Francis Champneys and Sir Ronald Ross. The first meeting, held on 20 November 1912 had 160 attendees. Subsequently, the society's events became regular, and it continues to hold events at the RSM.

Undergraduate prizes are awarded annually in memory of pathologist Norah Schuster. The society collaborates with the Medical Journalists' Association to award the annual Sarah Hughes Trust Prize to journalists and health care practitioners who expose misleading science. Every year, a practising social historian is invited to deliver the Bynum lecture, named for professor of medical history W. F. Bynum. In conjunction with the odontology section, the C. E. Wallis memorial lecture, named for Charles Edward Wallis, is delivered every five years.

== Origins ==
Interest in the history of medicine at the Royal Society of Medicine (RSM) was first noted in 1818, when an exhibition of the Chamberlen family's obstetric instruments took place at the Medical and Chirurgical Society of London. At the request of physician Joseph F. Payne, who was interested in the history of medicine, the RSM agreed to incorporate one meeting in each session on a historical topic. Following a failed attempt by Sir D'Arcy Power in 1900 to form a history of medicine section, Sir William Osler then succeeded in founding it by writing 168 personal invitations and planning for "all those who feel that the study of the history of medicine has a value in education". It was considered by Osler to be one of the three most useful things he achieved during his life in England. (Note: The other two were assisting the Association of British Physicians, and the Quarterly Journal of Medicine.)

=== First talks ===
HoMS was established to cover all medical specialities and with the support from Sir Francis Champneys, Sir Raymond Crawfurd, Sir Thomas Clifford Allbutt, Sir Ronald Ross, Sir William Selby Church, Sir Henry Morris, Henry Barnes and Professor Richard Caton, the first meeting on 20 November 1912 had 160 attendees The inaugural meeting, with Sir William Osler as first president, was based on manuscripts by William Petty, the history of Anaesthesia, and encouraging research and scholarship in medical topics. Despite opposition from Sir Richard Douglas Powell, Osler personally invited guests to join the new society. Dorothea Waley Singer became the first woman to deliver a paper to the HoMS in 1919. In 1927, the first British qualified female dentist, Lilian Lindsay, presented "The London Dentist of the 18th Century". She became the first female president of the HoMS in 1950.

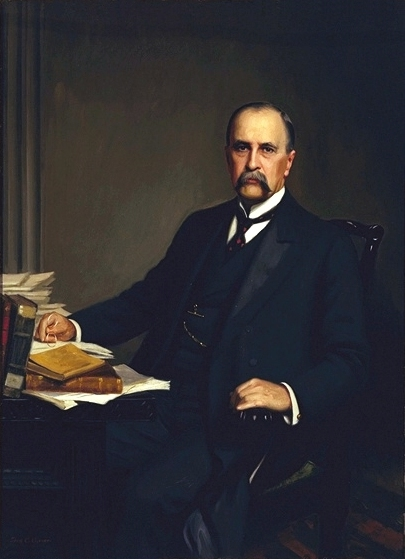
Sir William Osler

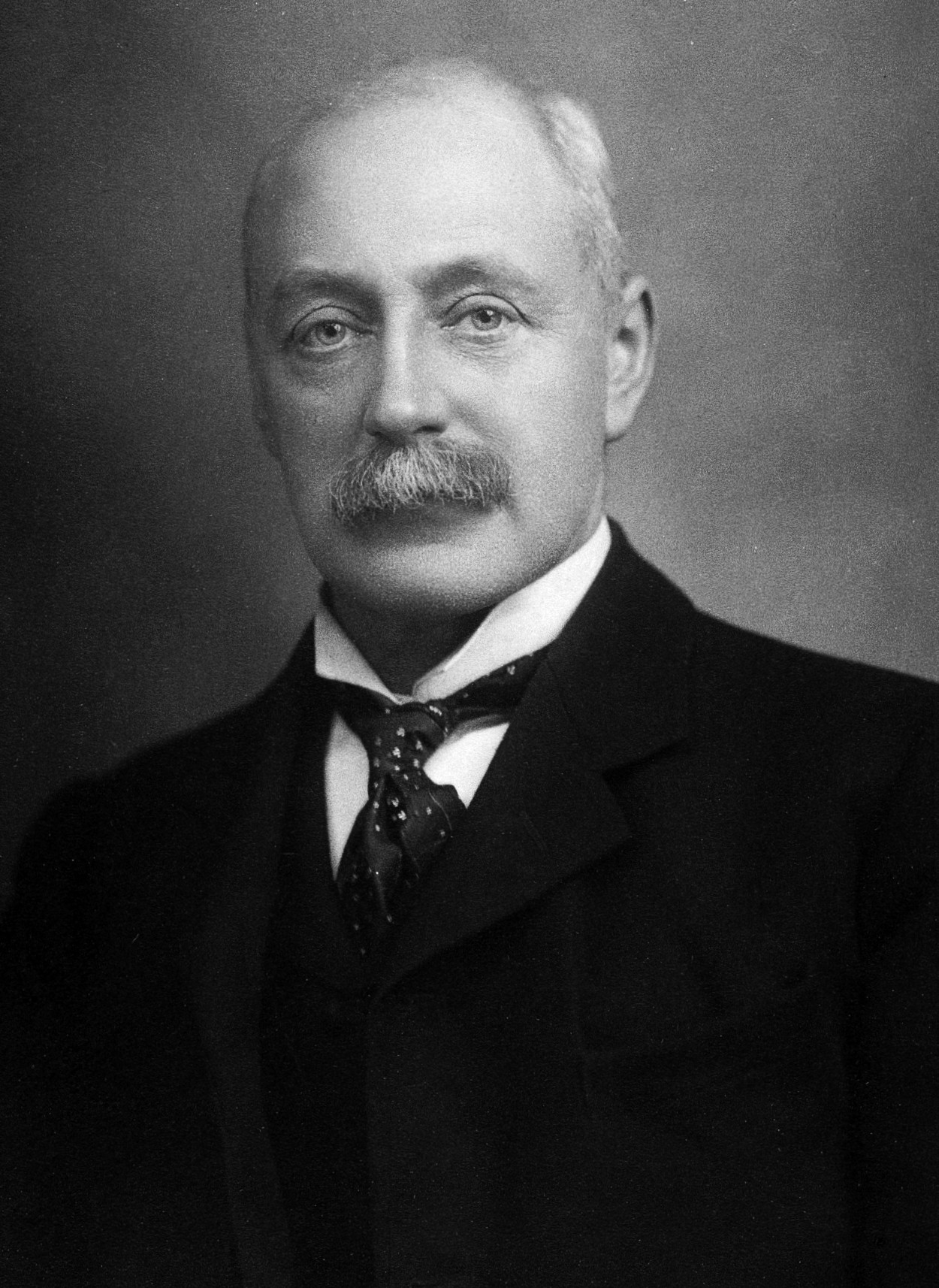
D'Arcy Power

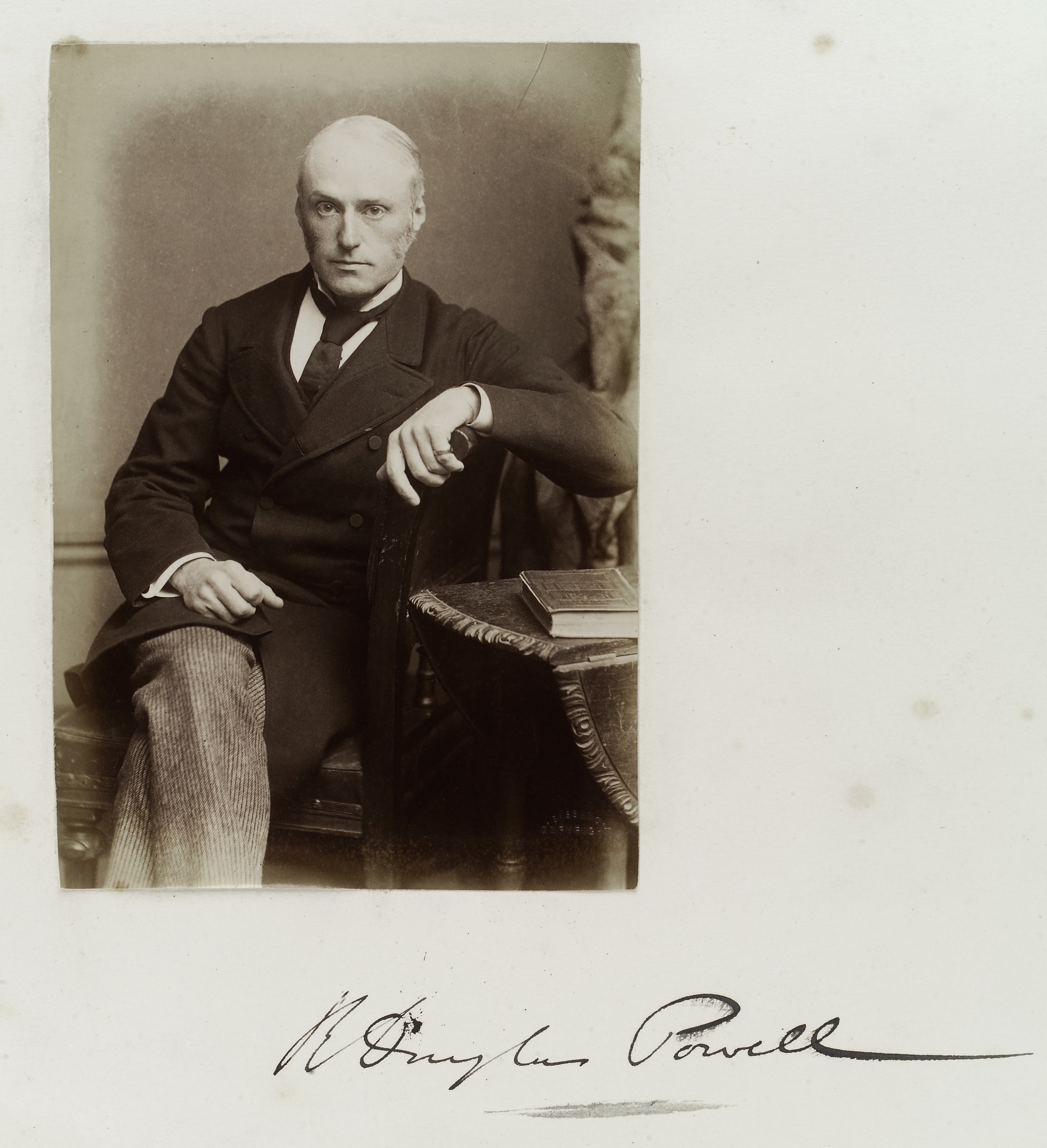
Sir Richard Douglas Powell - Opposition

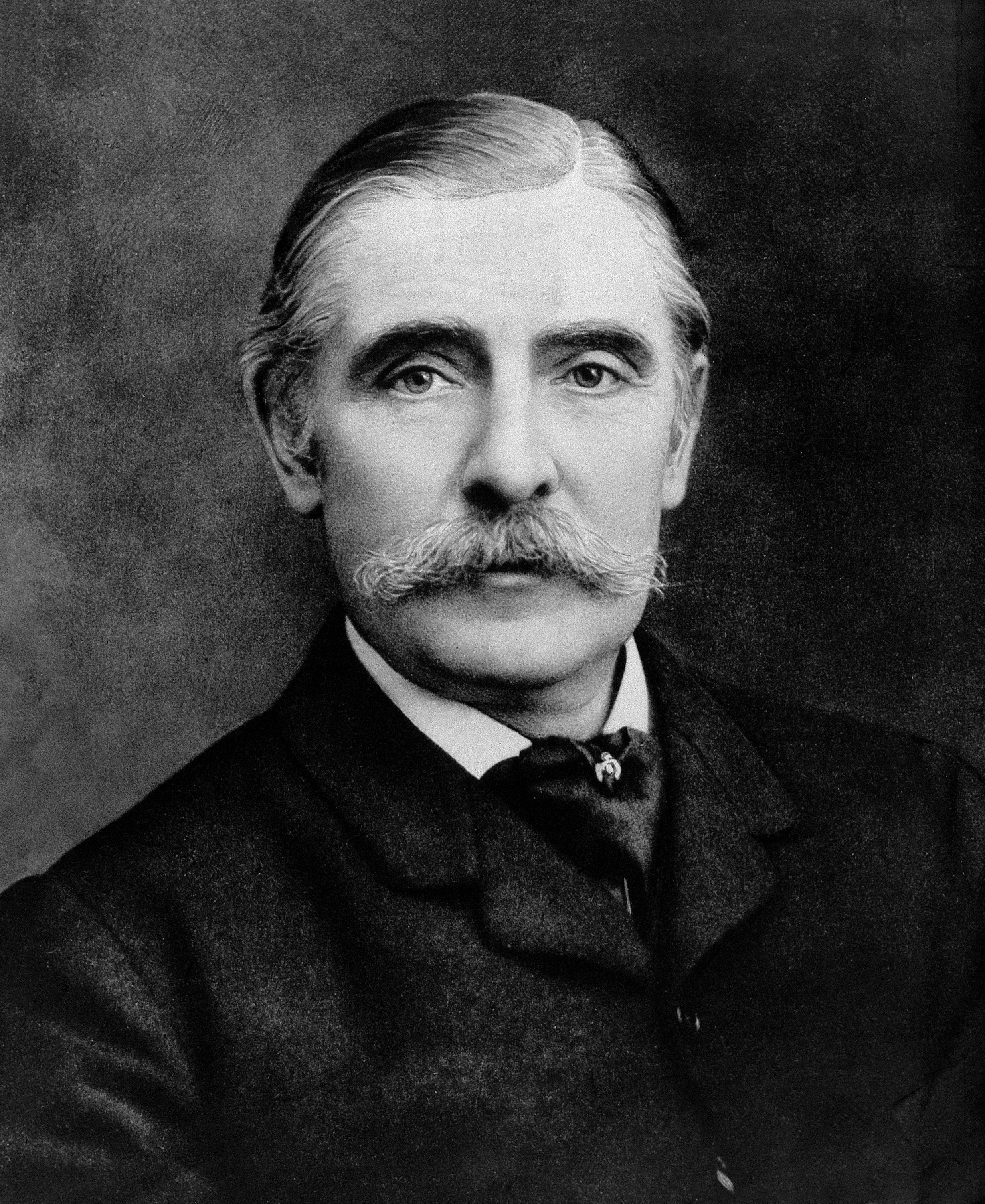
Sir Francis Champneys

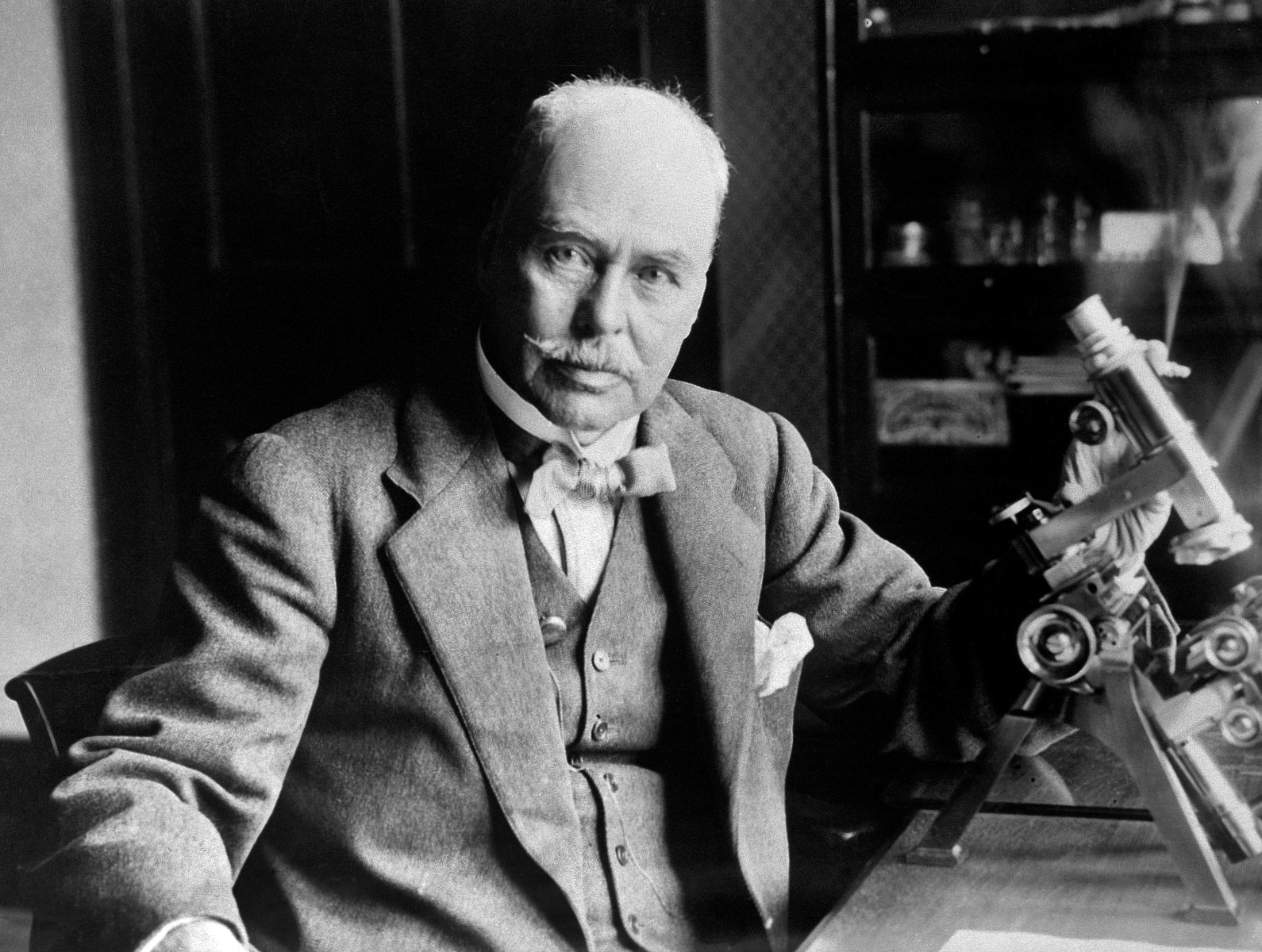
Sir Ronald Ross

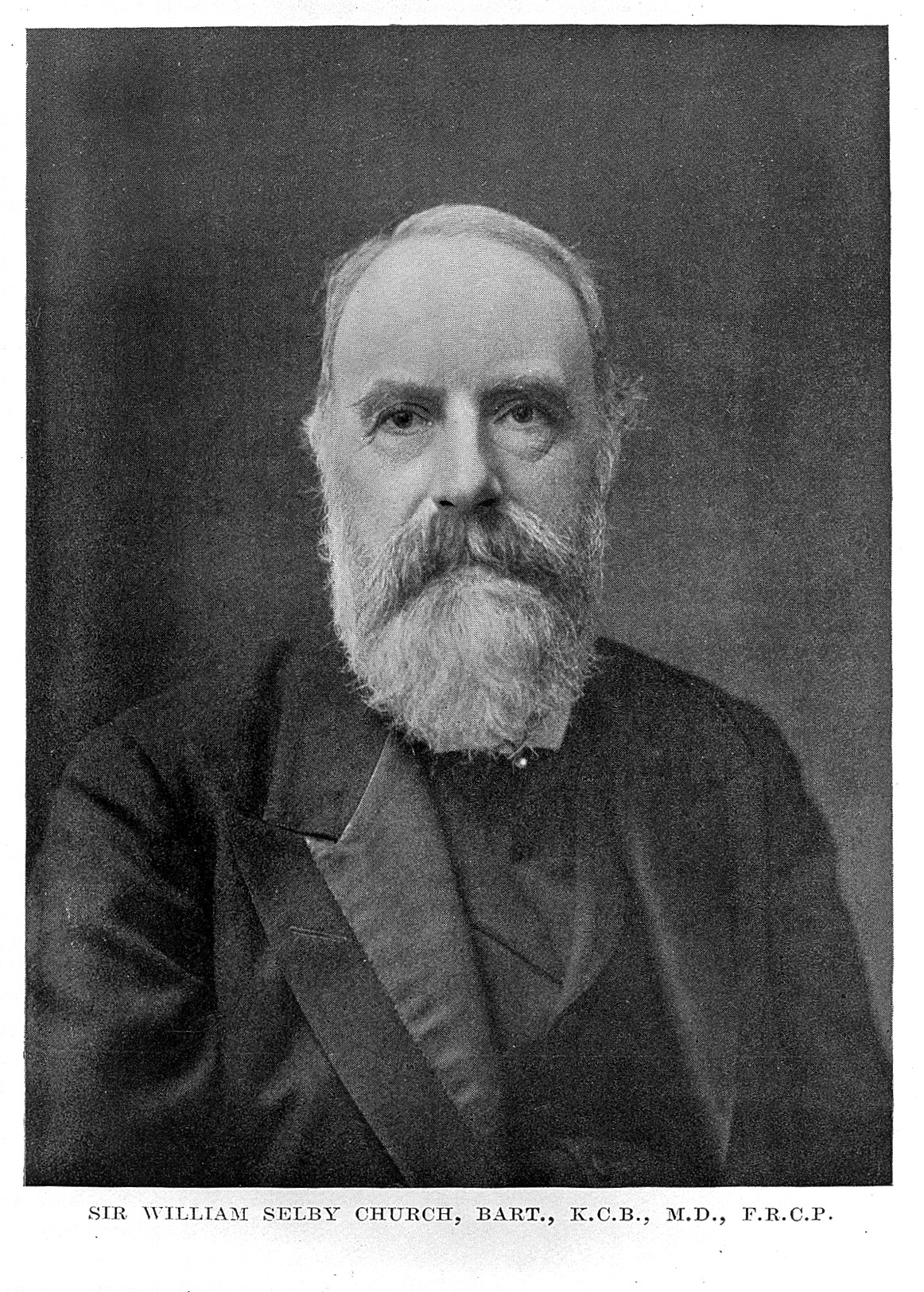
Sir William Selby Church

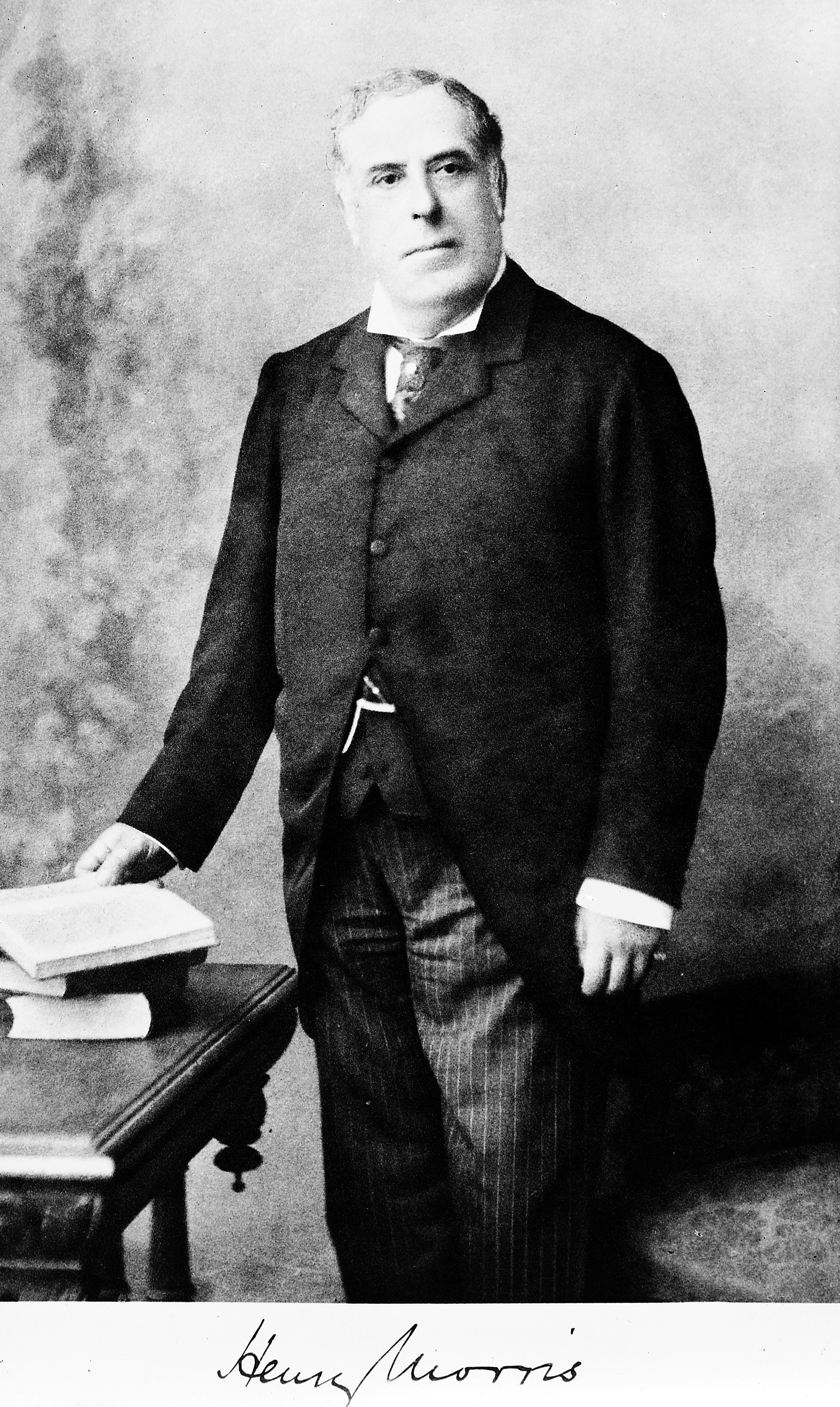
Sir Henry Morris

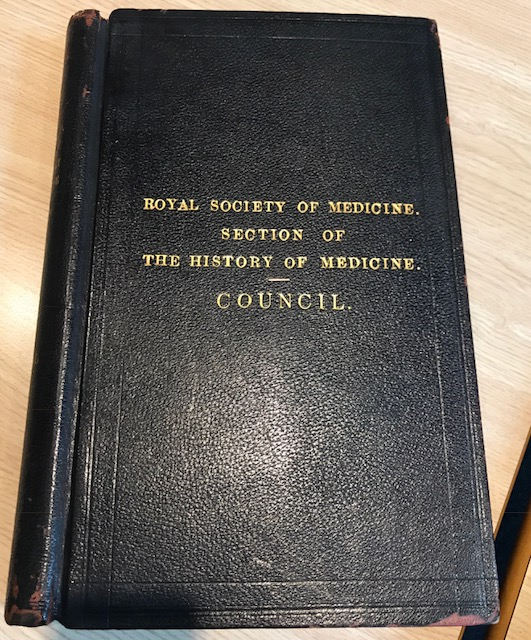
1912 Council Minutes

== Late 20th century ==
At its jubilee in November 1962, attracting younger colleagues was highlighted as an issue. At that meeting, it was noted that "the contribution to the knowledge of medical history made by the section has been very considerable". It became one of the four founder committees of the British Society for the History of Medicine.

The president's medal was initiated by William Hartstorn, who was president between 1973 and 1975. It was made by Kim Southam and donated by Maurice Newbold and officers of the section in 1976. When in 1993 the GMC issued "Tomorrows Doctors", which promoted studies in the history of medicine, the society organised a symposium on "The history of medicine and tomorrows doctors" in 1997.

== Prizes ==
=== Norah Schuster Prize ===
The Norah Schuster prize, established in 1991 and named for pathologist, Norah Schuster, is awarded annually. Around three essays in the field of history of medicine or science are chosen to receive the award. Holly Leigh Spencer, medical student at the University of Nottingham, Sarah Lancaster, medical student at Brighton and Sussex Medical School, and Alexandra Lisitsyna, medical student at Imperial College London, were winners in 2025.

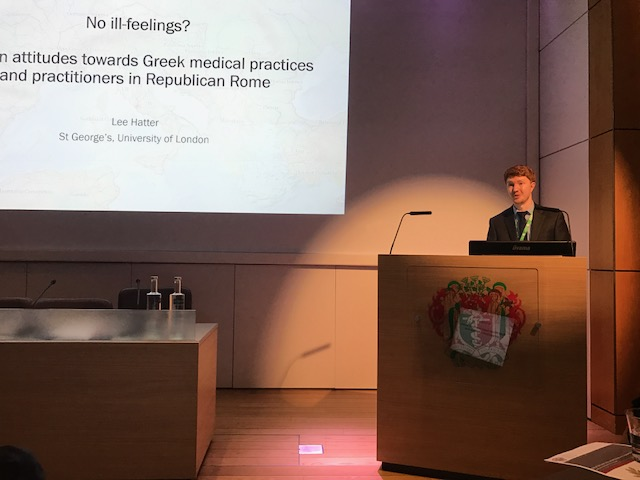
Lee Hatter, Norah Schuster Prize winner (2017)

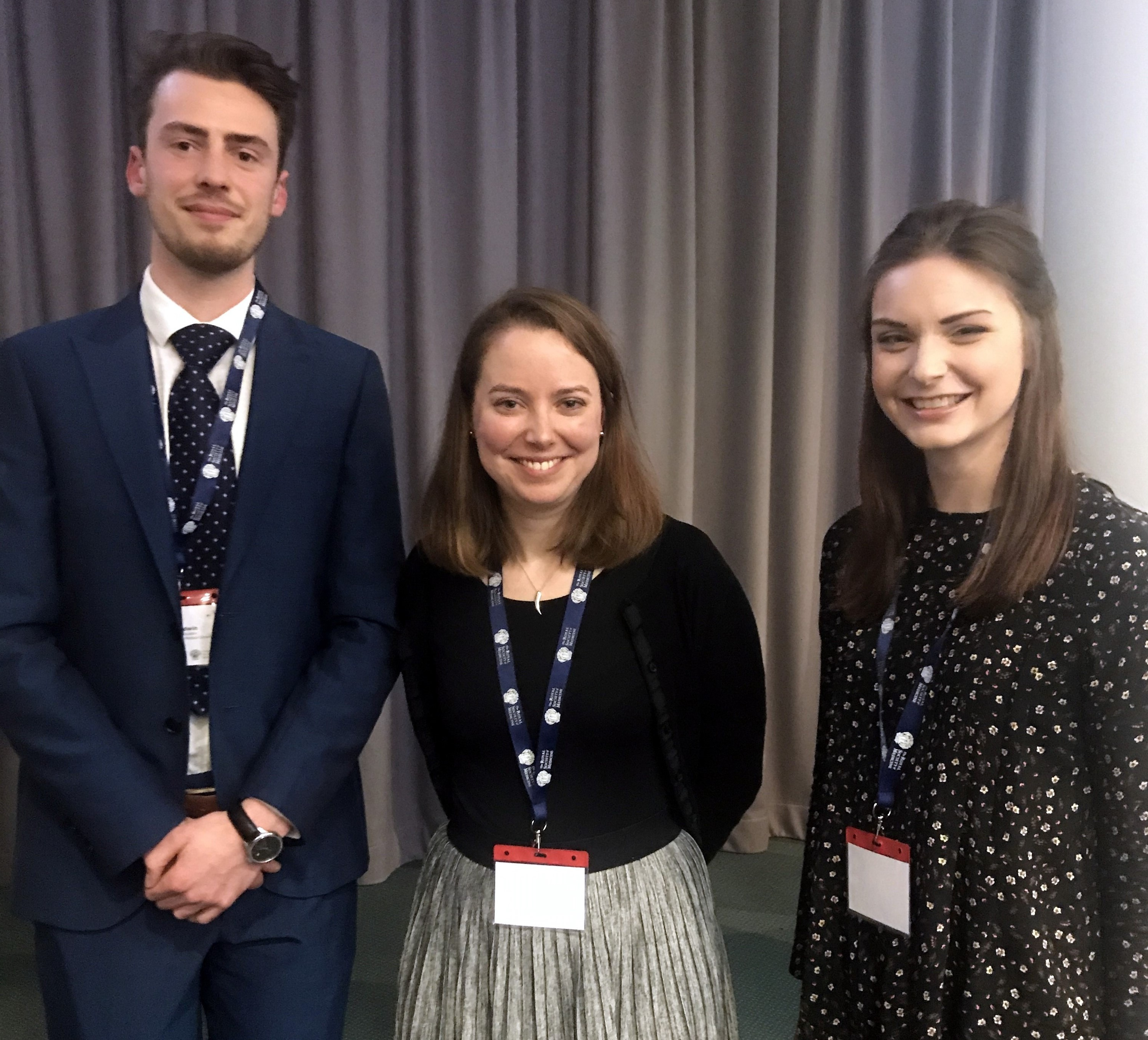
Norah Schuster Prize winners (2018)

Prize host, Eleanor Morris (2019)

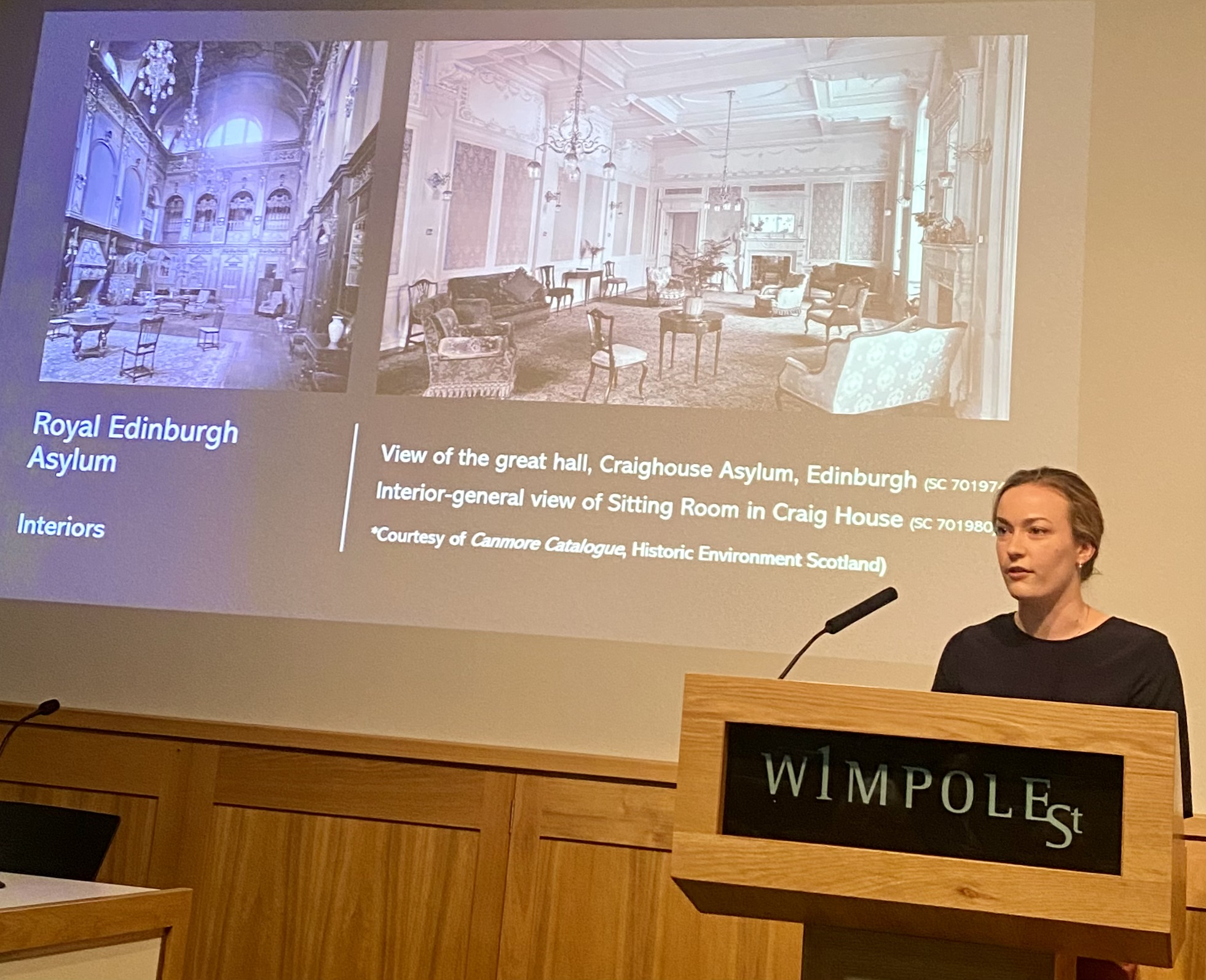
Joanna Park, Norah Schuster Prize winner (2022)

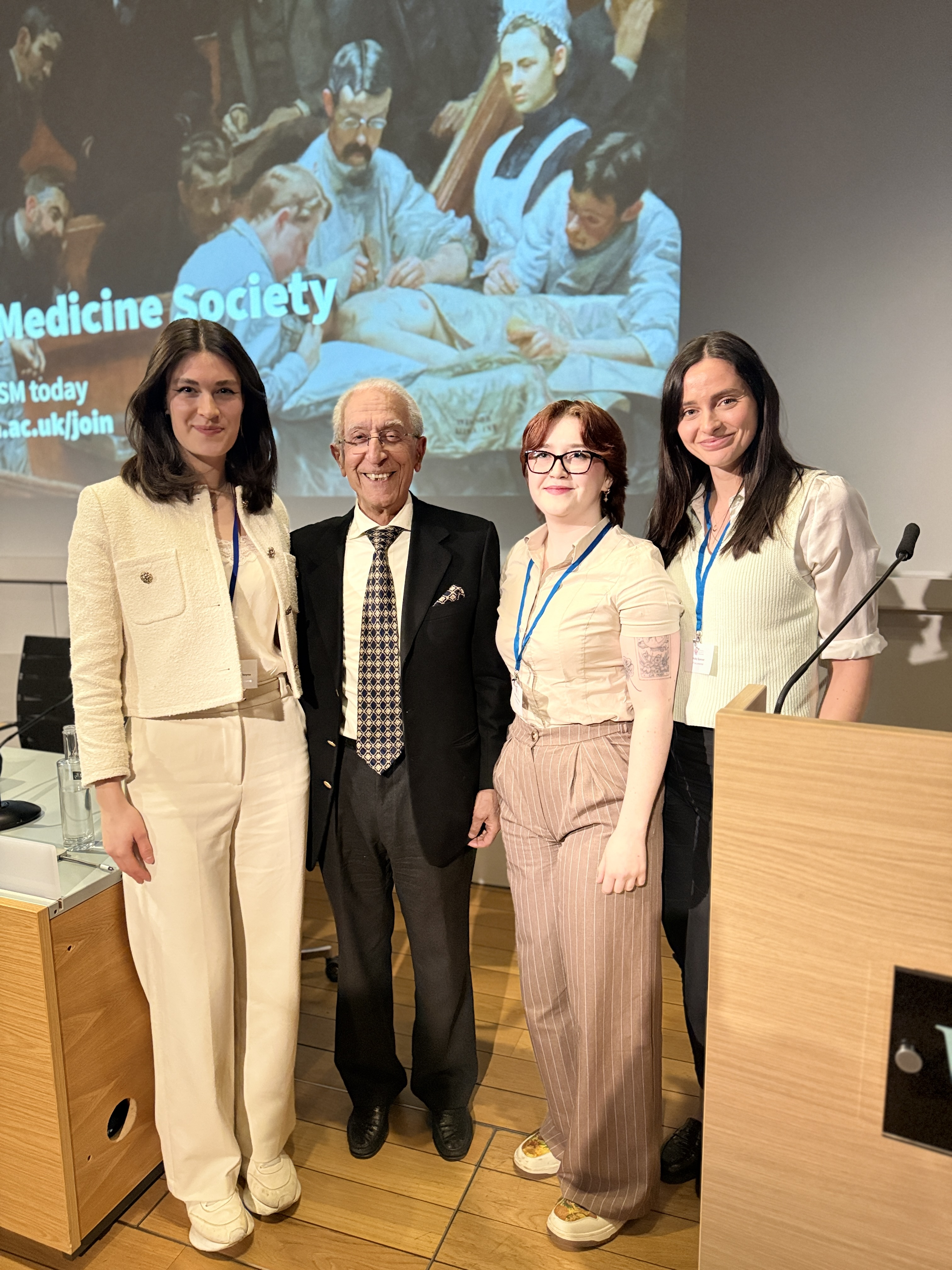
Majid Samii with Norah Schuster Prize winners (2025)

=== Sarah Hughes Trust Prize ===
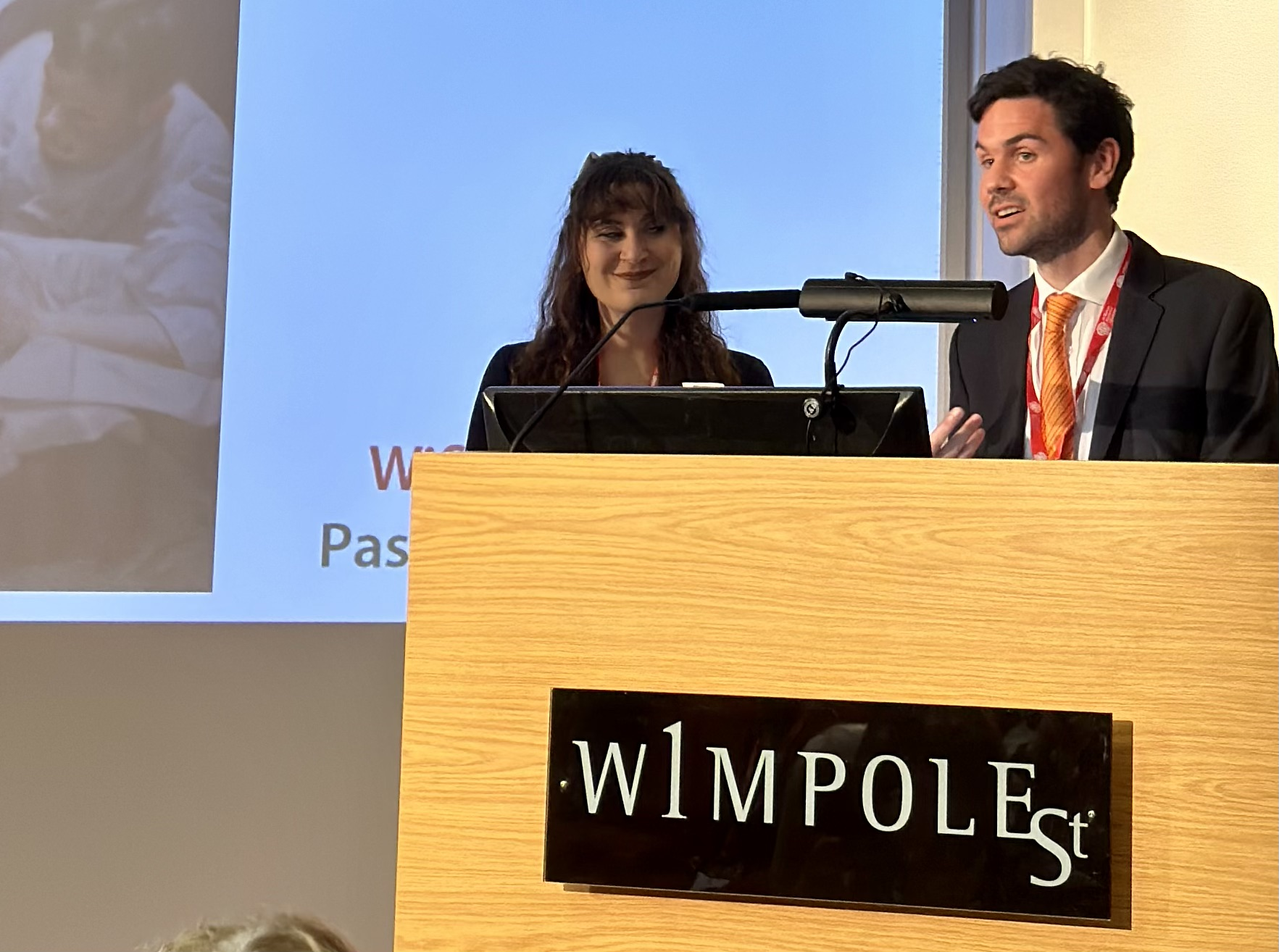
Sarah Hughes Prize winners (2022)

The society collaborates with the Medical Journalists' Association to award the annual Sarah Hughes Trust Prize to journalists and healthcare practitioners who expose misleading information. The prize was first awarded in 2022 when it was received by BBC journalists for exposing false science relating to ivermectin and COVID-19.

== Eponymous lectures ==
=== Bynum Lecture ===
The Bynum lecture is named for professor of medical history W. F. Bynum. It is delivered annually by a practising social historian.

=== C. E. Wallis Lecture ===
Named for physician and dental surgeon, Charles Edward Wallis, the C. E. Wallis memorial lecture is delivered every five years and arranged in conjunction with the odontology section. Wallis was active at the RSM and interested in history and archaeology. His brother, Ferdinand Wallis donated £100 in 1927 to fund a lecturer, appointed by the society to speak on the history of dentistry.

=== Sarah Hughes Trust Lecture ===
The Sarah Hughes Trust in conjunction with the HoMS funds an annual lecture, which was first delivered in 2021 as a conversation with between Jed Mercurio and health and social care editor at Channel 4 News, Victoria MacDonald. In 2022 it was delivered by Professor Dame Marina Warner.

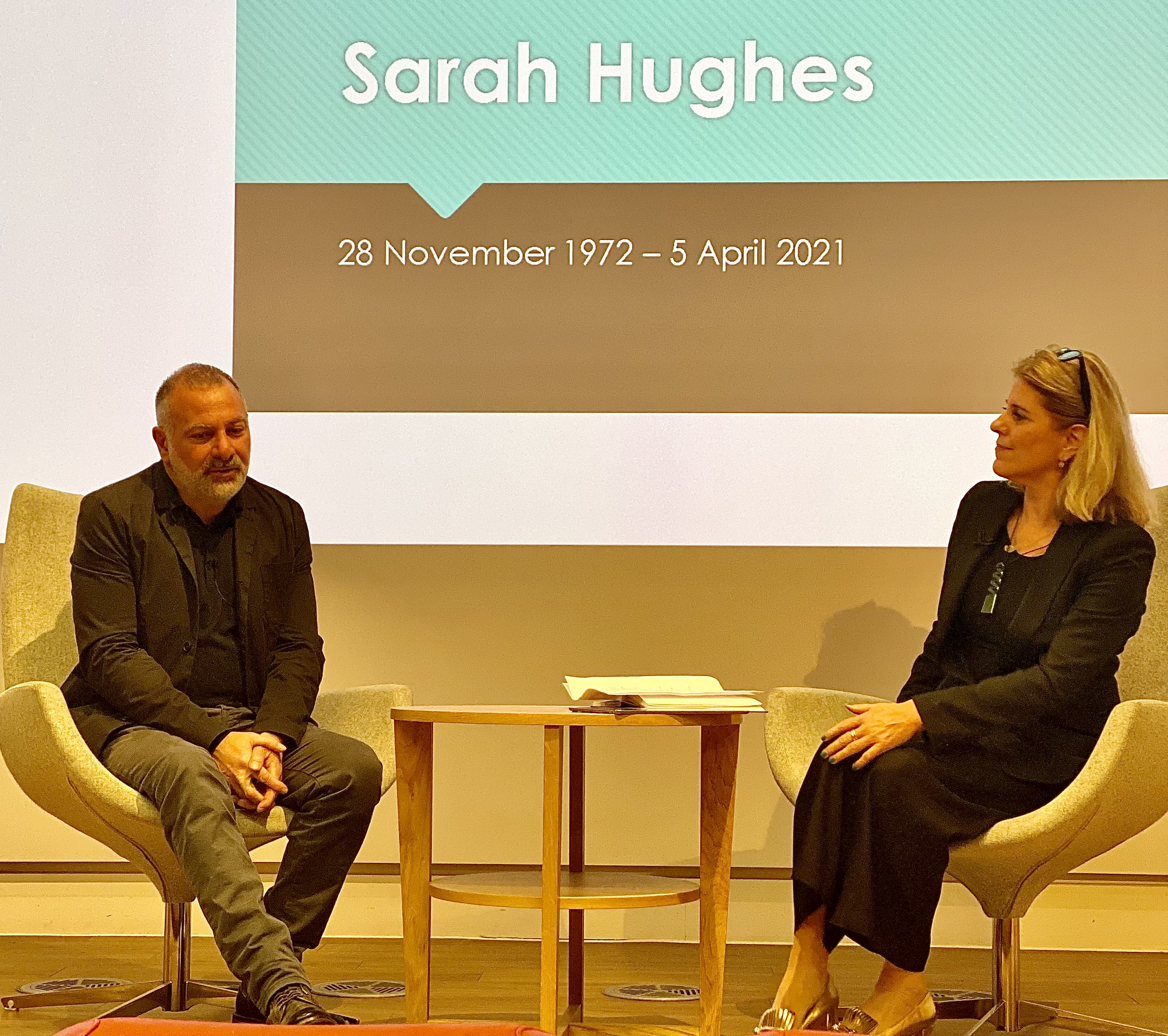
Jed Mercurio and Victoria MacDonald (2021)

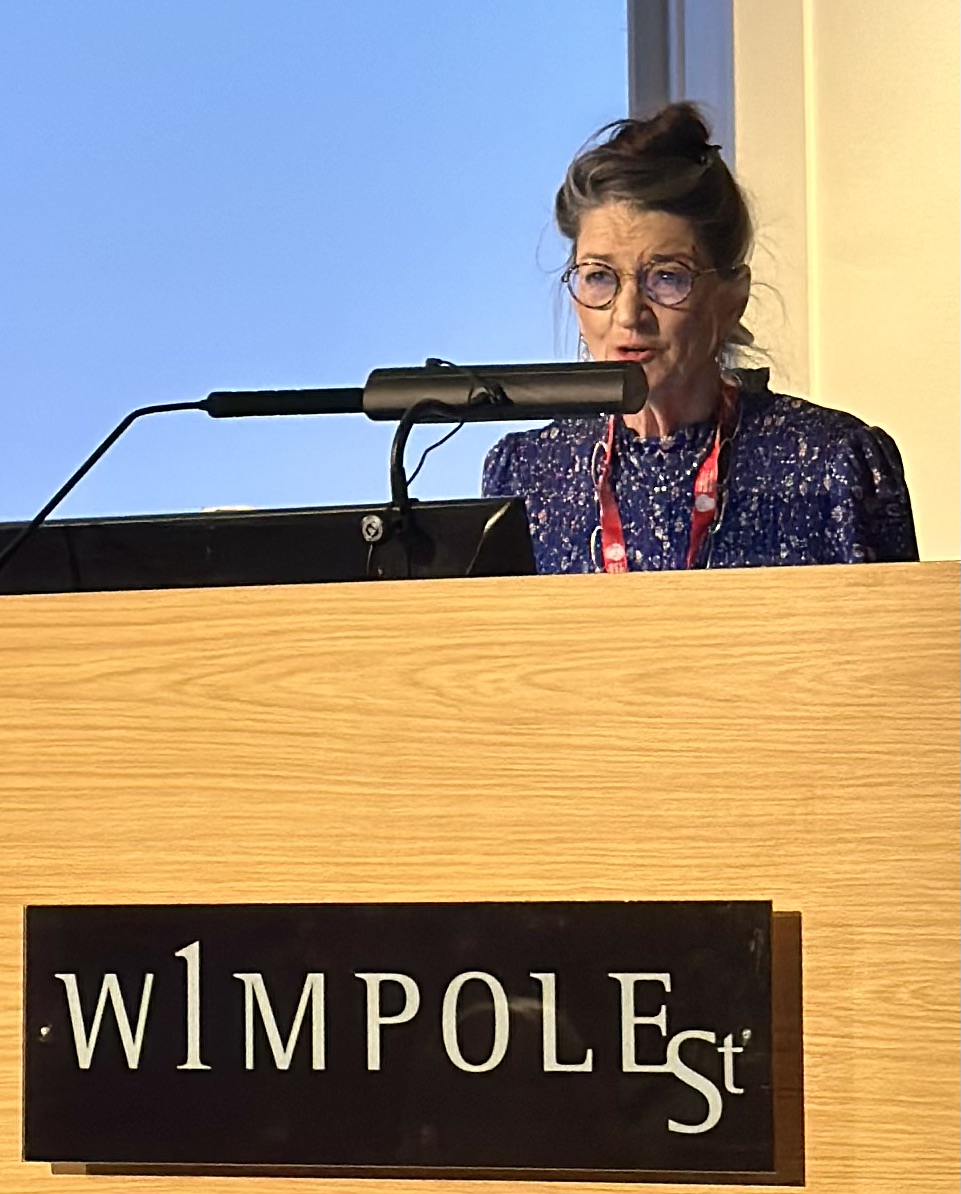
Dame Marina Warner (2022)

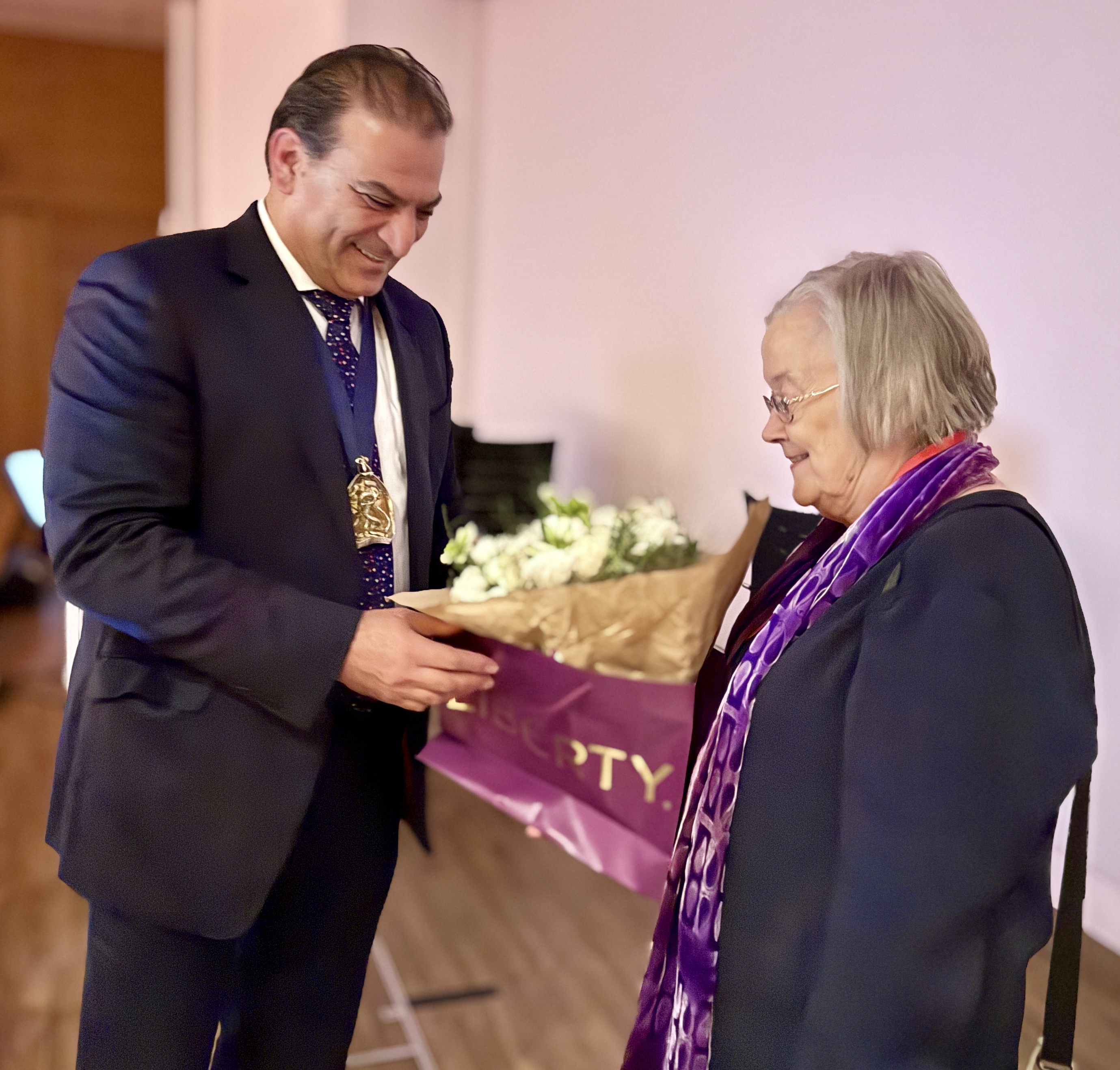
Andreas Demetriades and Baroness Hale (2024)

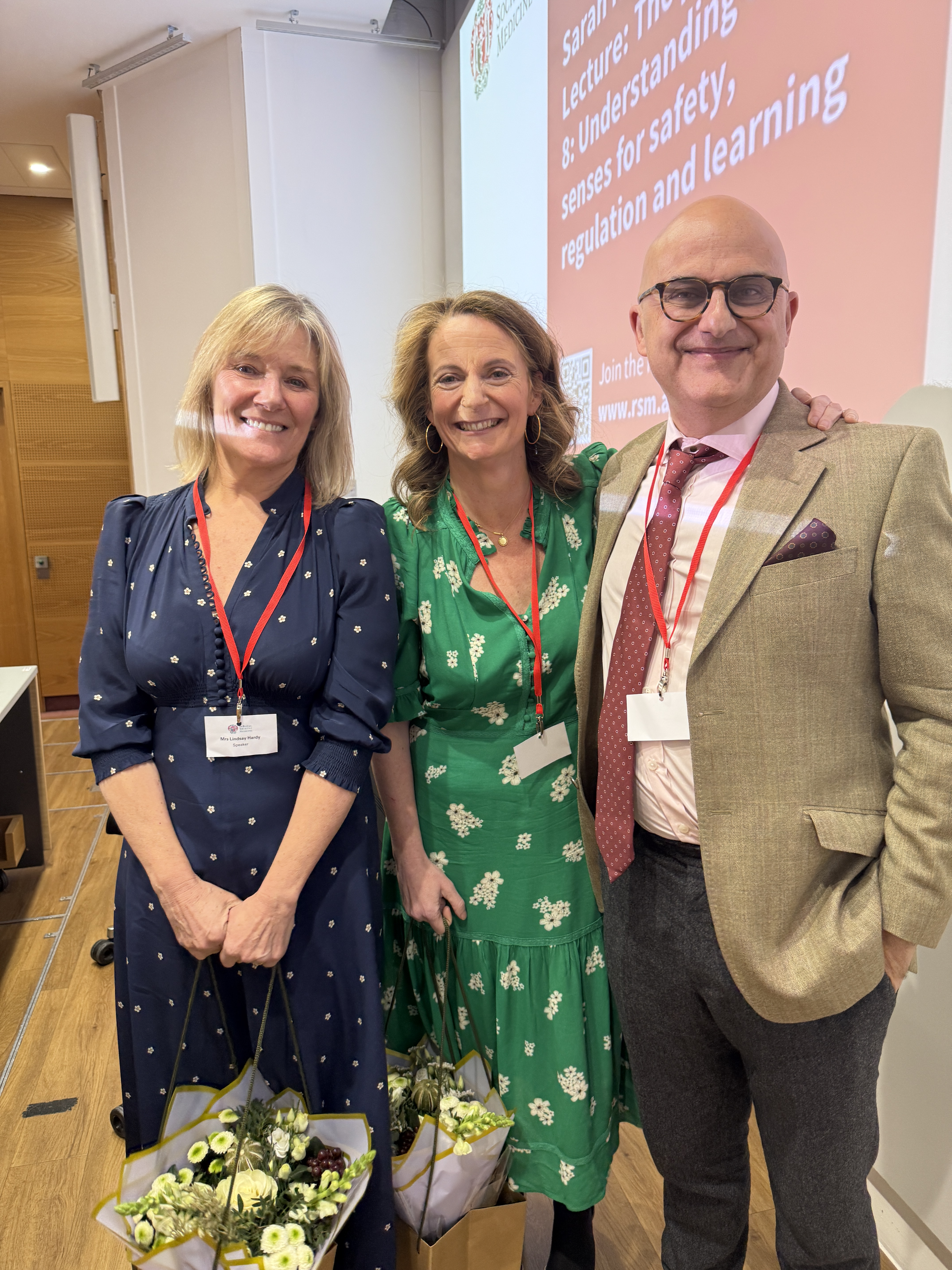
2025

== Honorary Fellows ==
In 2017 Tilli Tansey was elected Honorary Fellow of the RSM.

== Involvements ==
=== William Withering's letters ===
William Withering's letters were bestowed by Osler in his will. Sir William Hale-White, president of RSM 1922–1924, was a lecturer in medicine who, following retirement, studied the history of medicine and wrote on René Laennec and John Keats. He catalogued Withering's letters. A facsimile of Withering's letter was published by Ronald Mann in 1986.

=== Chalmers Room ===
Albert John Chalmers, born in Manchester in 1870, was a physician in tropical medicine in Ghana and Ceylon (now Sri Lanka). He died in India in 1920 and was known to have an interest in the history of medicine. His wife donated £500 and 350 old books from Chalmer's personal library, including a first printed edition of Celsus (1478), to the new Chalmer's room on the RSM library's third floor. This room was opened by a ceremony on 23 June 1922. Although the actual room no longer exists, many of its books were displayed in 2016 as part of an exhibition in the RSM library.

== See also ==
- List of presidents of the History of Medicine Society
