= Noël Poynter =

British librarian and medical historian (1908–1979)

Noël Poynter FLA
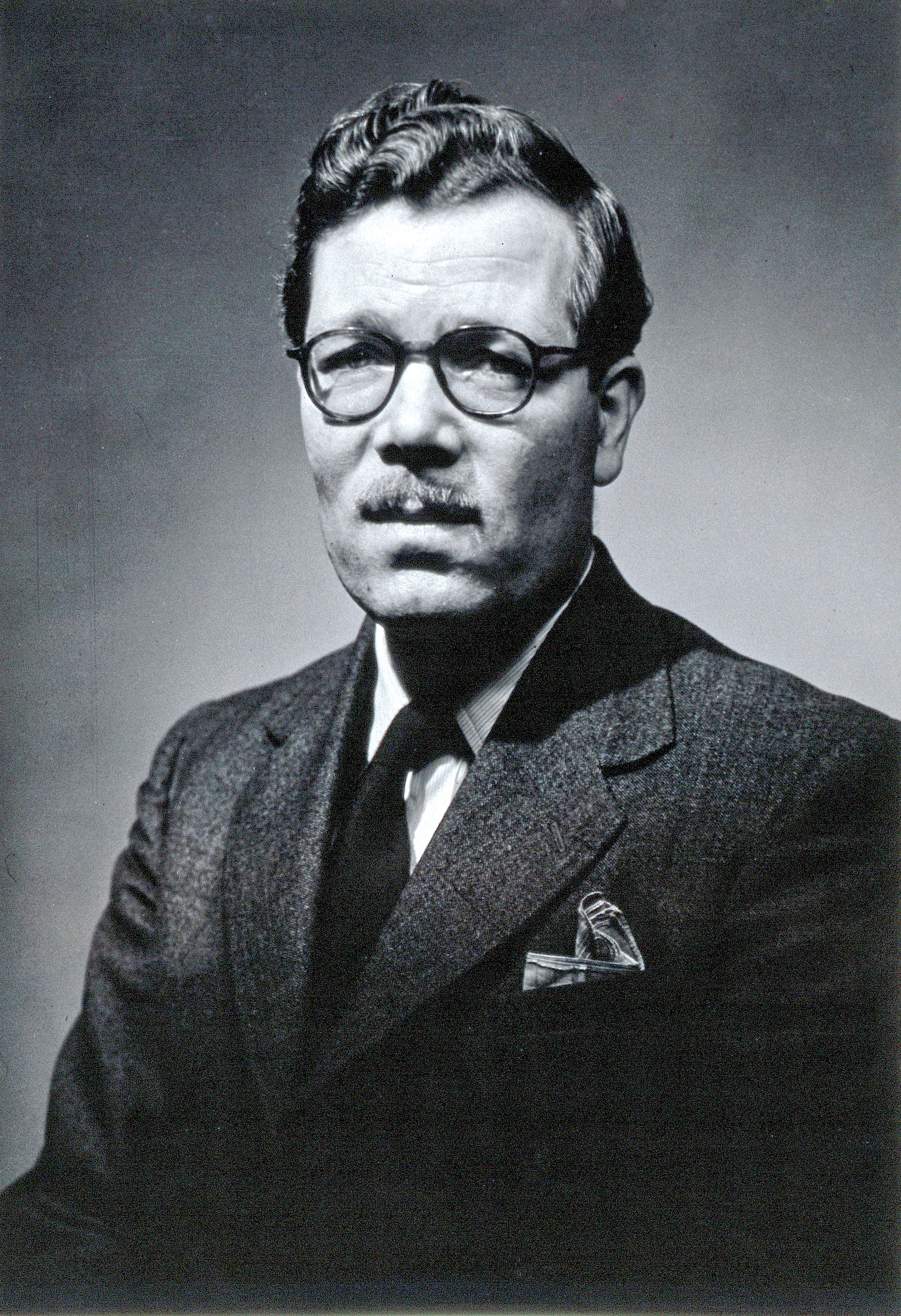
- Noël Poynter
- Born: 24 December 1908
- Died: 11 March 1979 (aged 70)
- Occupations: Librarian; Medical historian; Director of the Wellcome Institute for the History of Medicine
- Known for: Co-founding the British Society for the History of Medicine (BSHM) (1965); Editor of the Medical History; President of the BSHM (1972); President of the Société Internationale d’Histoire de la Médecine; Poynter lecture
- Medical career
- Profession: Librarian and medical historian

Frederick Noël Lawrence Poynter FLA (24 December 1908 – 11 March 1979) was a British librarian and medical historian who served as director of the Wellcome Institute for the History of Medicine from 1964 to 1973.

In 1958, Poynter was a key player in founding the Faculty of the History of Medicine and Pharmacy of the Society of Apothecaries and subsequently in 1965, he was one of the founding committee members who established the British Society for the History of Medicine (BSHM). He became its president in 1972 and also became secretary-general of the Société Internationale d’Histoire de la Médecine, later becoming its president too.

He published a number of works related to the history of medicine and also edited Medical History, the first British journal devoted exclusively to the history of medicine. During his directorship of the Wellcome Institute for the History of Medicine, his advice was readily sought on matters pertaining to the history of medicine and on organisations. His influence was particularly felt with the Bibliographical Society and he was invited to give a number of eponymous lectures. The biennial Poynter lecture is named in his honour.

== Early life and career ==
Frederick Poynter, commonly known as Noël, was born in London on 24 December 1908, to Herbert William Poynter, who worked in the London docks, and his wife, Margaret (née Gurry). The family were Roman Catholic and he was the seventh of nine children.

He was educated at West Ham secondary school, before studying history at King's College London.

In 1930, following a brief time teaching in a preparatory school, he became a junior library assistant and was involved in the last stages of Sir Henry Wellcome's collections, at a time when the library was situated in the cramped conditions of the former wireless factory near Willesden Junction, north west London. At the time, the librarian was Samuel Arthur Joseph Moorat.

Poynter completed his diploma in librarianship in 1936 at the University of London and his bachelor's degree in 1938, when he was promoted to sub-librarian.

== Second World War ==
Poynter was influenced by the historian Max Neuburger, who joined the Wellcome staff after fleeing Nazi occupied Europe. When library space was allocated at the Wellcome building in Euston Road in 1941, it was Poynter that was appointed to organise the transfer of the books. This was interrupted when he was posted to the Royal Air Force educational branch, but by becoming a fellow of the Library Association, he was able to complete his professional qualifications in 1942. He was demobilised in 1946.

== The Wellcome Library ==
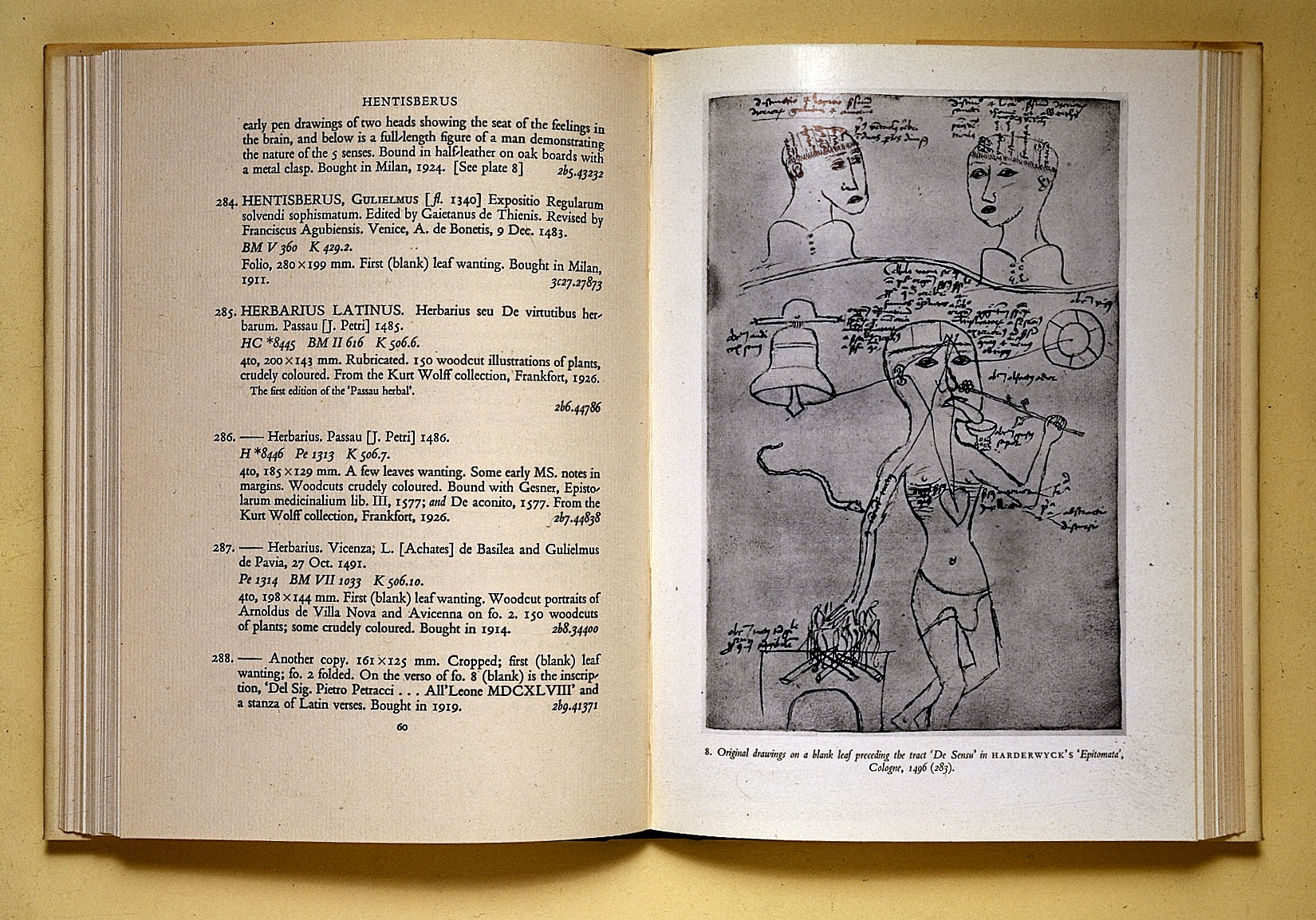
Pages from Poynter's A Catalogue of Incunabula (1954)

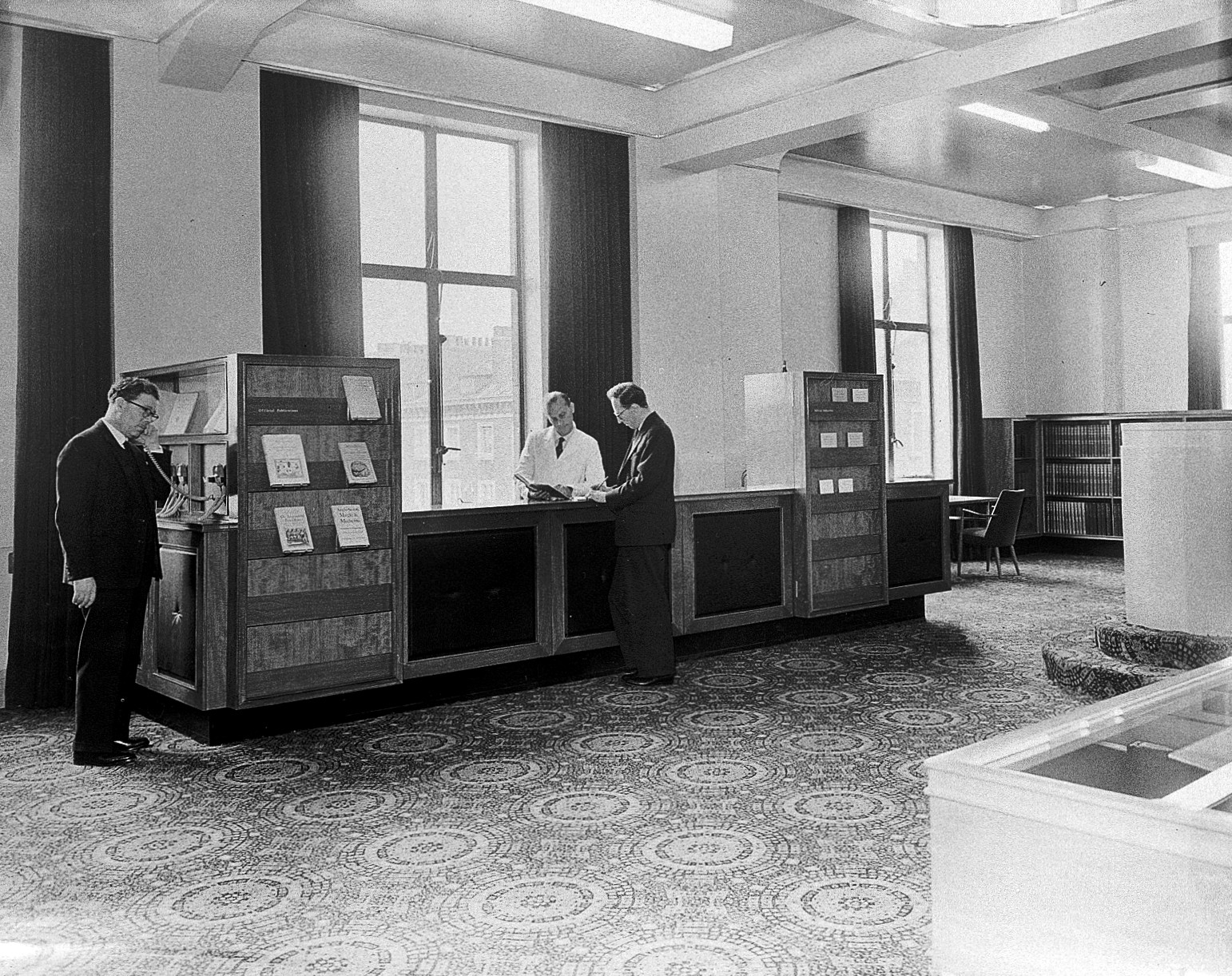
Poynter, Gaskell and Walkins in library reading room

On his return to the library, he was promoted to deputy librarian and formed a successful partnership with W. J. Bishop, who succeeded Moorat. The Wellcome Library officially opened in 1949 and with Bishop he encouraged the development of its services and raised its profile via the medical section of the Library Association. Together, they worked on research and bibliography, and in 1953, they also led the organisation of the first International Congress on Medical Librarianship. Its proceedings, edited by Poynter, were published in 1954. When Bishop resigned in 1953, due to frustrations with the Wellcome Historical Medical Museum and its director, Edgar Ashworth Underwood, Poynter took over as librarian and began in this role with the publication of the quarterly Current Work in the History of Medicine, followed by a catalogue of the library's incunabula.

In 1956, Poynter gained a PhD from Westfield College for his work on Gervase Markham. This bibliography was published in 1963.

== Medical societies ==
In 1958, Poynter was a key player in founding the Faculty of the History of Medicine and Pharmacy of the Society of Apothecaries, serving first as its secretary and editor of its proceedings, and then as its chairman in 1970. Its success led to the foundation of the BSHM in 1965, when he was one of its founding committee members along with William Copeman, Haldane Philp Tait, K. D. Keele, D. Geraint James, Douglas Guthrie, E. S. Clarke and Charles Newman. Between 1965 and 1967, he was president of the Osler Club of London. He became president of the BSHM in 1972.

Poynter was also active in the reorganisation of the Société Internationale d’Histoire de la Médecine, becoming its Secretary-General. He subsequently became the president of the International Academy of the History of Medicine.

== Journals ==
Following Bishop's death in 1961, Poynter succeeded him as editor of the first exclusive British journal to the history of medicine, Medical History, a journal he founded and then edited between 1957 and 1973.

He was appointed to the editorial board of the Journal of the History of Medicine and Allied Sciences, with the assistance of his American colleagues.

== Director of the Wellcome Institute of the History of Medicine ==
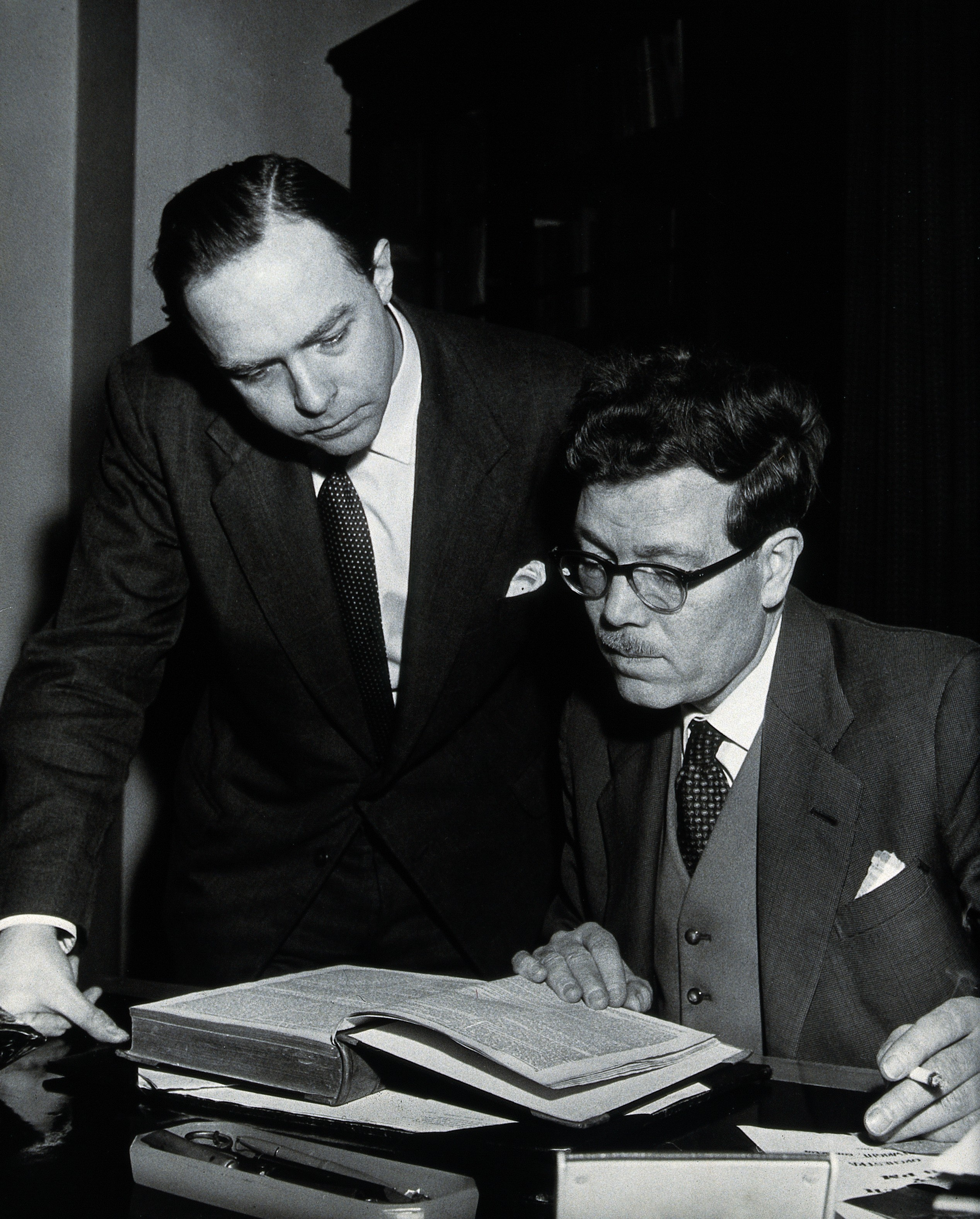
Edwin Clarke and Noel Poynter. Wellcome

In 1964, Poynter was appointed Director of the Wellcome Institute of the History of Medicine, a position he held until 1973, after which he was succeeded by E. S. Clarke. During his directorship, he became influential, particularly with the Bibliographical Society. His writing activities earned him a Doctorate of Literature. His advice was frequently sought on a variety of topics including organisational and academic themes. He gave a number of lectures, including the Gideon De laune Lecture to the Society of Apothecaries (1964) and the Vicary Lecture at the Royal College of Surgeons (1973).

== Personal life ==
In 1939, Poynter married sculptor Ruth Marder. They had no children. She died in 1966 and he remarried two years later, to Dodie. He retired to France in 1973.

== Death and legacy ==
Poynter died on 11 March 1979 at Brive in France, following a short illness. The BSHM biennial Poynter lecture is named in his honour. In addition, the Wellcome library's rare materials room has been named the "Poynter room" for him.

== Publications ==
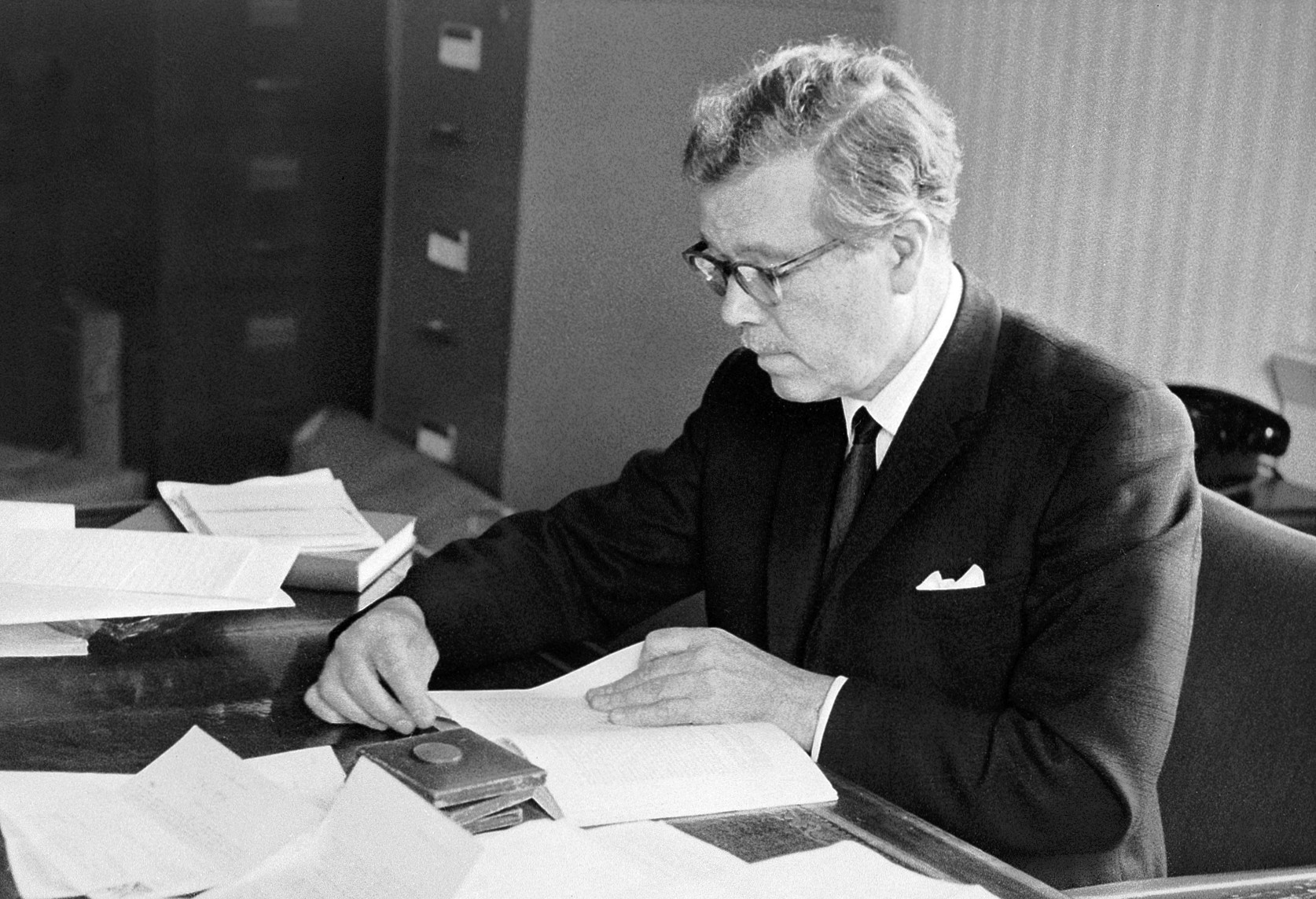
Poynter at work

In 1951, with his friend Bishop, they published work on the medical attendant of Oliver Cromwell in A Seventeenth Century Doctor and his Patients: John Symcotts, 1592?–1662. Other publications included

- Selected writings of William Clowes (1948)
- A Catalogue of Incunabula in the Wellcome Historical Medical Library (Oxford University Press, 1954)
- A translation of William Harvey's Lectures on the Whole of Anatomy (1961)
- A Short History of Medicine, with K. D,. Keele (1961)
- The Journal of James Younge, Plymouth Surgeon (1963)

=== Selected articles ===
- "William Harvey's Debate with Caspar Hofmann on the Circulation of the Blood: New Documentary Evidence". Journal of the History of Medicine and Allied Sciences, Vol. 15, No. 1 (January 1960), pp. 7–21. With Ercole V. Ferrario and K. J. Franklin
- "Robert Talbor, Charles II, and Cinchona; A Contemporary Document", (1961) pp. 82–85. With Rudolph E. Siegel.
