= D. Geraint James =

Welsh physician

- Born: 2 January 1922; Treherbert, Wales
- Died: 20 October 2010 (aged 88)
- Education: Jesus College; Middlesex Hospital
- Known for: Research in sarcoidosis; Co-founder of WASOG; Co-founder of the BSHM
- Medical career
- Institutions: Royal Northern Hospital; Hammersmith Hospital; Brompton Chest Hospital
- Sub-specialties: Rheumatology
- Research: Sarcoidosis

David Geraint James FRCP (2 January 1922 – 20 October 2010) was a Welsh physician who devoted his career to the treatment of sarcoidosis, setting up a specialist clinic for the condition and earning the nickname "King of Sarcoid".

In 1958, he organised the first international conference on sarcoidosis, and was instrumental in the setting up of the World Association of Sarcoidosis and other Granulomatous Disorders (WASOG) in 1987.

James was involved in a number of societies including the Medical Society of London and the Osler Club of London, which he represented at the formation of the first committee of the British Society for the History of Medicine (BSHM) in 1965.

== Early life and education ==
David Geraint James, also known as Gerry, was born on 2 January 1922 in the mining village of Treherbert, Rhondda Fawr Valley, Wales. His father, local headmaster David James, wrote a regular column in Welsh for The Western Mail, a daily national paper. James had one stepbrother, Arnold, from his father's first marriage, who later became the town clerk of Stepney. James's mother, Sarah (née Davies) who was widowed, had a family farm in Llanarth, near New Quay, Cardiganshire and already had three daughters when she married James's father. James was her fourth child and was just six years old when his father died.

James became an active member of Urdd Gobaith Cymru (Welsh League of Youth) by the age of 10. He was fluent in both Welsh and English, giving speeches in both languages. He also played the organ and rugby. After attending Pen-Yr-Englyn primary school and then the Rhondda County School for Boys, his interest in science and ambition to study medicine lured him to Pontypridd County School.

In 1939, he joined Jesus College, a Welsh college at the University of Cambridge and subsequently gained admission to the Middlesex Hospital, London, to study medicine. In June 1941 at the age of 19, he gained a bachelor's degree with honours in the National Science Tripos of anatomy, physiology, and biochemistry.

== Second World War ==
During his time as a student at the Middlesex Hospital, James assisted the casualties of The Blitz. With colleagues, he transported the wounded to safety and fire-watched at night. In addition, during the Second World War, James served in the Royal Navy working as physician to a small fleet of minesweepers in the English Channel.

== Medical career ==
He completed house posts and early training with both George Ernest Beaumont at the Brompton Chest Hospital and the Middlesex Hospital and with Professor John Scadding at the Brompton Hospital and the Hammersmith Hospital, where he first became interested in Sheila Sherlock, who he later married, and sarcoidosis, a condition that was a specialism of Scadding.

In 1950, James took Sheila with him to New York, to work at the New York Presbyterian Hospital, where he researched viral pneumonia for which his thesis on the topic later gained him an MD. In New York, he was influenced by Louis Siltzbach's large sarcoidosis clinic and his diagnostic tool, the kveim test, which James later renamed the Kveim-Siltzbach test.

James returned to the Middlesex Hospital in 1951 with a large supply of kveim antigen given to him by Siltzbach. Initially he configured a classification of sarcoidosis and according to the type, made suggestions for treatments. This was followed by further research into the immunology of the disease. In 1956, the Middlesex awarded him a Leverhulme research scholarship for his efforts.

In 1958, he organised the first international conference on sarcoidosis at the Brompton Hospital, at which 28 delegates, representing eight countries attended. The meeting lasted for three days and was the first international conference on sarcoidosis. He was later involved in setting up the World Association of Sarcoidosis and other Granulomatous Disorders (WASOG) in 1987, in Milan, Italy and became its first president. Subsequently, with the personal financial support of Gianfranco Rizzato, the journal Sarcoidosis, later renamed Sarcoidosis Vasculitis and Diffuse Lung Diseases, became the association's official publication. James became the journal's editor-in-chief and in 1987, the journal published a festschrift in his honour.

In 1959, James was appointed consultant physician at London's Royal Northern Hospital and shortly after, began a specialist sarcoidosis clinic, which attracted rheumatologists from around the world. The clinics provided an abundance of people with the disease with referrals from around the country and carried out a number of clinical trials. His registrar at the time, Alimuddin Zumla, later described James as "an excellent teacher...if you listened to his lectures you would never forget them. He had a way of imparting knowledge that was special". James also encouraged a multidisciplinary approach in order to better understand the disease and according to Zumla, was intrigued by the mystery that surrounded sarcoidosis, a rare long-term disease with an unknown cause. "Gerry liked challenges", said Zumla.

In 1959, with Gordon Beckett and Simon Behrman, he co-founded the Eye Physic Club. From 1963 he was involved in a new medical eye unit which later moved to St Thomas' Hospital. In 1968, he was appointed as dean to the Royal Northern Hospital. His private practice was at 149 Harley Street.

James's lifetime work on sarcoidosis led him to be known as the "King of Sarcoid".

== History of medicine ==
In 1964 James was elected President of the Medical Society of London. He was inspired by Jonathan Hutchinson, William Osler, and William Harvey. After the death of his wife Sheila in 2001, he wrote daily on the lives of notable medical men and women. His last two articles came were published in The History of Medical Biography. In 1965, he represented the Osler Club of London when he was part of the founding committee of the British Society for the History of Medicine, along with William Copeman, Haldane Philp Tait, K. D. Keele, Douglas Guthrie, F. N. L. Poynter, Edwin Sisterton Clarke and Charles Newman.

James was involved in a number of other societies, either as a member or as president, including the Cymmrodorion, the Glamorganshire Society, the Worshipful Society of Apothecaries, the Royal Society of Medicine, the Harveian, the Hunterian Society, the American Osler Society and the History of Medicine Society of Wales.

== Personal ==
In 1949, James met Sheila Sherlock, later Professor Dame Sheila Sherlock, the eminent hepatologist, at the Hammersmith Hospital. On 15 December 1951 they married and they subsequently had two daughters, Amanda and Auriole.

== Death and legacy ==
James died on 20 October 2010.

== Selected publications ==
By 1958, James had written seven papers on sarcoidosis, two being on its effects on eyes, and had published his first book The diagnosis and treatment of infections (1957). In addition, he authored more than 600 papers.

In his 1985 book Major Problems in Internal Medicine Vol.24. Sarcoidosis and Other Granulomatous Disorders, co-authored with W. Jones, and published by W. B. Saunders, the clinical and diagnostic findings of James's 818 sarcoid patients covering a period of 30 years, are evaluated.

In 1999, with Professor Alimuddin Zumla, he co-edited the standard textbook on the subject of sarcoidosis, The Granulomatous Disorders.

=== Selected articles ===
- James, D.Geraint (1959). "Ocular sarcoidosis". The American Journal of Medicine. 26 (3): 331–339. doi:10.1016/0002-9343(59)90242-6. PMID 13626988.
- "The Riddle of Uveitis", Postgraduate Medical Journal (1964) 40, pp. 686–691
- "Postgraduate medicine and personalities-1925", Postgraduate Medical Journal (1985)61, pp. 861–864
- James, D Geraint (1995). "The Sarcoidosis Movement and Its Personalities". Journal of Medical Biography. 3 (3): 148–160. doi:10.1177/096777209500300305. PMID 11639833. S2CID 21982827.

=== Books and book chapters ===
- James, Geraint D. (1993). "Oculo-Renal Sarcoidosis". Diseases Affecting the Eye and the Kidney: 389–399. doi:10.1159/000422072. ISBN 978-3-8055-5660-6.

== See also ==
List of Welsh medical pioneers
