= British Society for the History of Medicine =

History society in the UK

The British Society for the History of Medicine
- BSHM logo
- Formation: 1965
- Founder: History of Medicine Society at The Royal Society of Medicine, London; Osler Club of London; Faculty of the History of Medicine and Pharmacy; Scottish Society of the History of Medicine
- Founded at: Royal Society of Medicine
- Fields: History of medicine
- 1st President: Douglas Guthrie
- Present President: Hilary Morris
- Website: bshm.org.uk

The British Society for the History of Medicine (BSHM) is an umbrella organisation of History of medicine societies throughout the United Kingdom, with particular representation to the International Society for the History of Medicine. It has grown from the original four affiliated societies in 1965; the Section for the History of Medicine, The Royal Society of Medicine, London, Osler Club of London, Faculty of the History of Medicine and Pharmacy and the Scottish Society of the History of Medicine, to twenty affiliated societies in 2018.

The society holds its congress biennially in centres around the UK, with the eponymous Poynter Lecture, named after librarian and medical historian F. N. L. Poynter, being held on alternate years in London.

== Purpose ==
The chief purpose of the BSHM is "to form an umbrella organisation to 'promote, organise or sponsor' history of medicine activities in Britain and to represent British interests to the International Society for the History of Medicine".

== Origins ==
The British Society for the History of Medicine was founded in 1965 following the establishment and success of the Faculty of the History of Medicine and Pharmacy of the Worshipful Society of Apothecaries of London, as result of the work of librarian and medical historian F. N. L. Poynter, who along with Douglas Guthrie, also organised the BSHM in its early years.

It was established by four original societies - the Section for the History of Medicine, The Royal Society of Medicine, London, the Osler Club of London, the then Faculty of the History of Medicine and Pharmacy of the Society of Apothecaries of London and the Scottish Society of the History of Medicine.

The founding committee comprised;

- W. S. C. Copeman and F. N. L. Poynter
- Douglas Guthrie and H. Tait
- K. D. Keele and E. Clarke
- Charles Newman and D. Geraint James

In 1966, Medical History became the BSHM's official publication.

== Past presidents and the medal ==
The first president of the BSHM was Douglas Guthrie, an Edinburgh surgeon, whose reputation as a medical historian was enhanced by the publication of his major work A History of Medicine. He had been the driving force in establishing the Scottish Society of the History of Medicine in 1948, and he was also elected first president of that society. Zachary Cope and Arthur MacNalty were appointed honorary presidents, Lord Cohen of Birkenhead, W. S. C. Copeman and K. D. Keele as vice-presidents, Poynter as honorary secretary and Edwin Clarke as Poynter's assistant. Charles Newman became treasurer. Poynter also became the national delegate to the International Society for the History of Medicine and Geraint James his deputy.

The logo on the president's medal comprises the logo's of the four founding member societies.

== Affiliated societies ==
The BSHM has a number of affiliated societies whose members also become members of the BSHM. The first two to become affiliated before 1971 were the Society for the Social History of Medicine and the British Society for the History of Pharmacy. Later, others included;

- Osler Club of London
- The Royal Society of Medicine's History of Medicine Society
- Scottish Society of the History of Medicine
- The Lindsay Society for the History of Dentistry
- British Society for the History of ENT
- British Society for the History of Radiology
- History of Anaesthesia Society
- History of Medicine Society of Wales
- Liverpool Medical History Society
- Faculty of the History and Philosophy of Medicine and Pharmacy

The BSHM works with the British Society for the History of Paediatrics and Child Health.

The Bristol Medico-Historical Society held the 2019 biennial BSHM Congress.

== Congresses ==
The first five congresses were organised by the Faculty of History and Medicine and Pharmacy. The BSHM Congresses have since taken place at centres throughout the UK, in the form of a two- or three-day meeting where keynote lectures are delivered and peer-reviewed papers and posters are presented.

In 1969, the congress was held at Churchill College, Cambridge.

The eighth congress was held in Liverpool in 1971, under the presidency of Lord Cohen of Birkenhead, when Alfred White Franklin was the BSHM's treasurer.

In 1997, the Bristol Medico-Historical Society hosted the seventeenth congress in Bristol University, when Beryl Corner presented her paper "Elizabeth Blackwell 1821-1910: The First Woman on the U.K. Medical Register 1850".

== Poynter Lectures ==
The BSHM congresses had taken place on four occasions between 1965 and 1973. The Poynter Lecture, in memory of Noël Poynter, was created with the aspiration that the Wellcome Trust would hold joint sponsorship. In addition to being a past president of the BSHM, he was Director of the Wellcome Institute for the History of Medicine from 1964 to 1973. He made a number of important contributions to the study of the history of medicine and his influence was felt throughout the world.

== John Blair Trust ==
John Blair was a consultant surgeon from Perth Royal Infirmary, who taught at St Andrews and Dundee Universities and became a medical historian. The International Society for the History of Medicine congress, held in Glasgow in 1994 agreed that a Trust Fund could be established in 1995. The John Blair Trust (JBT) was thus established that year by the BSHM and the SSHM. It awards bursaries to undergraduate medical students and allied sciences students, with the objective of promoting "the study of the history of medicine".

== Selected publications ==
=== Congress proceedings ===
- The Evolution of Medical Practice in Britain (1960 conference, London)
- Chemistry in the Service of Medicine (1961 conference, London)
- The Evolution of Hospitals in Britain (1962 conference, London)
- The Evolution of Pharmacy in Britain (1963 conference, Nottingham)
- The Evolution of Medical Education in Britain (1964 conference, London)
- Medicine and Science in the 1860s (1967 conference, Brighton)
- Cambridge and its Contribution to Medicine (1969 conference, Cambridge)
- Wales and Medicine (1973 conference, Swansea/Cardiff)
- Child Care Through the Centuries (1984 conference, Swansea)
- The Influence of Scottish Medicine (1986 conference, Edinburgh)
- A Pox on the Provinces (1988 conference, Bath)
- Medicine in Northumbria (1993 conference, Newcastle)

== See also ==
- List of presidents of the British Society for the History of Medicine
- Poynter Lecture
