= Poynter Lecture =

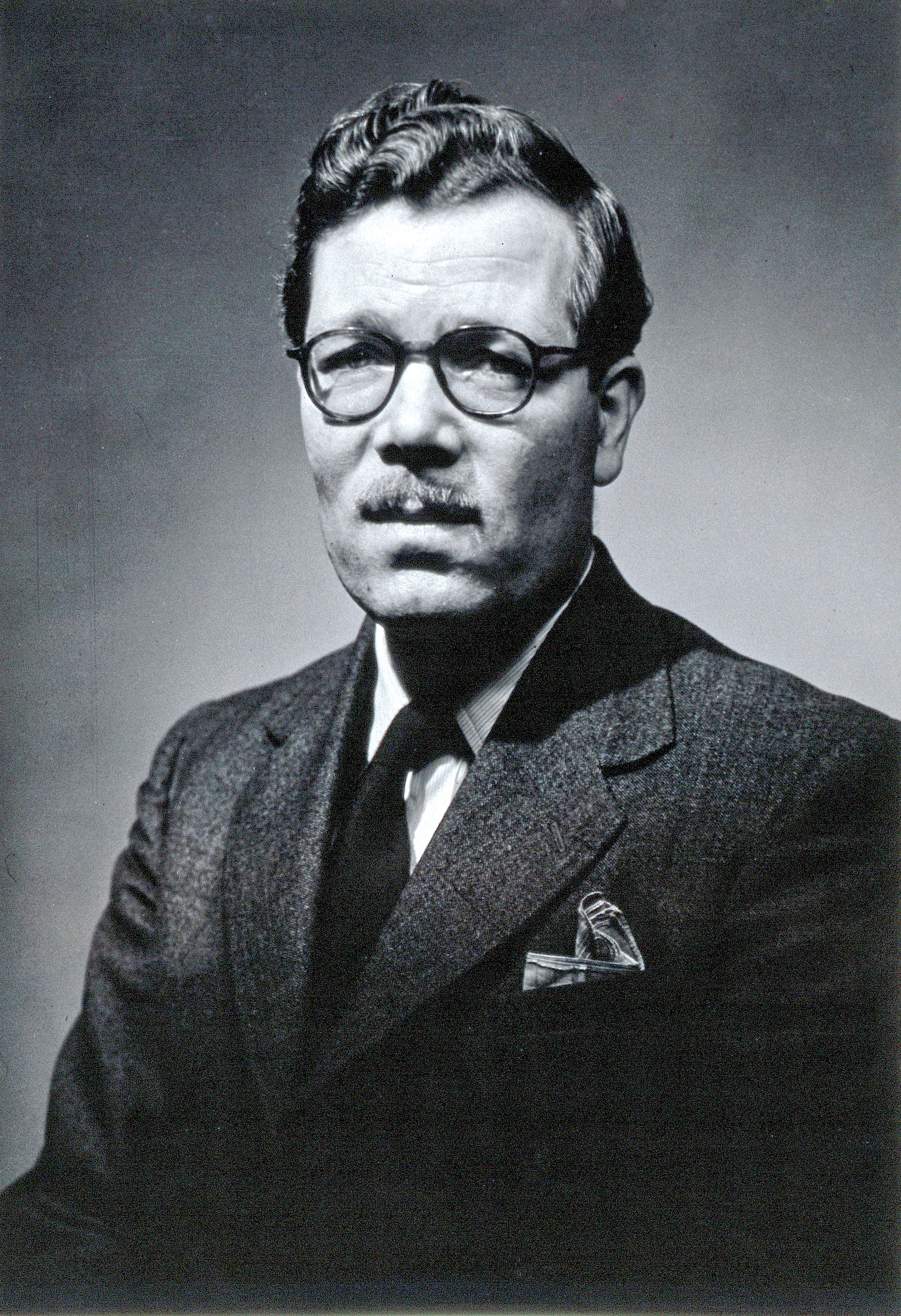
Frederick Noël Lawrence Poynter, BSHM co-founder

The Poynter Lecture is given every two years at the British Society for the History of Medicine in memory of Noël Poynter, past president of BSHM, who was Director of the Wellcome Institute for the History of Medicine from 1964 to 1973.

Poynter made a number of important contributions to the study of the history of medicine and his influence was felt throughout the world. He devoted much time and energy to societies devoted to the study of the history of medicine. He was a prime mover in the founding of the Faculty of the History of Medicine of the Society of Apothecaries in 1958. He was an active member of the Société Internationale d’Histoire de la Médecine, contributing to its reorganisation. He went on to become Secretary-General and then President of the International Academy of the History of Medicine. His links with American historians led to his appointment to the editorial board of the Journal of the History of Medicine and Allied Sciences.

Poynter was a regular contributor to journals and author of a series of books, many of which dealt with medicine in Tudor and Stuart times. These included The Selected Writings of William Clowes (1544–1608), A Seventeenth Century Doctor and His Patients: John Symcott, William Harvey: Lectures on the Whole of Anatomy.

In 1961, he published A Short History of Medicine, a brief account of the evolution of medicine aimed at a younger readership, while Medicine and Man (1971) addressed social aspects of the history of medicine.

He founded and then edited the journal Medical History from 1957 until 1973.

== Lectures ==
- 1st Poynter Lecture, 27 September 1983 - "The first Poynter Lecture" - Lecturer: Mrs Dodie Poynter, Noël Poynter's second wife
- 2nd Poynter Lecture, 30 May 1985 - "Leonardo on natural mathematics" - Lecturer: Dr. Kenneth Keele
- 3rd Poynter Lecture, Wednesday 20 May 1987 - "The role of the microscope in the development of medicine" - Lecturer: Brian Bracegirdle
- 4th Poynter Lecture, 20 June 1990 - "Some Irish Medical Humanists" - Lecturer: Professor Jack Lyons
- 5th Poynter Lecture, 25 Nov 1992 - "Caterpillars in Commonwealth Anglo-European Medical relations in the Sixteenth century" - Lecturer: Vivian Nutton
- 6th Poynter Lecture, 23 May 1994 - "Knives and Bodies in Scottish heraldry" - Lecturer: Charles C Burnett KStJ
- 7th Poynter Lecture, 28 June 1996 - "The Olympic Cult of Health, Baron Coubertin and the Neurasthenic Nineties" - Lecturer: Professor Michael Biddiss
- 8th Poynter Lecture, 11 May 1998 - "Government, Charities and the fundraising of Medical research 1948-1998" - Lecturer: Bridget Ogilvie
- 9th Poynter Lecture, 10 May 2000 - "Does a ‘National’ Health Service make ‘Regional’ History trivial?" - Lecturer: Professor John Pickstone
- 10th Poynter Lecture, 8 May 2002 - "For love or money? Amateurs and professionals as historians of modern medicine" - Lecturer: Professor Tilli Tansey
- 11th Poynter Lecture, 7 April 2004 - "Experimental Lives; Medicine and the Lunar Society" - Lecturer: Jenny Uglow OBE
- 12th Poynter Lecture, 14 March 2006 - "Remedies from our natural flora: piecing together an under-related tradition" - Lecturer: Dr. David E. Allen
- 13th Poynter Lecture, 26 March 2008 - "Leonardo’s Philosophical Anatomies" - Lecturer: Professor Martin Kemp
- 14th Poynter Lecture, 24 March 2010 - "The ethics and etiquette of patient care in the Georgian era" - Lecturer: Dr Ruth Richardson
- 15th Poynter Lecture, 21 March 2012 - "Shocking Bodies" - Lecturer: Dr Iwan Rhys Morus
- 16th Poynter Lecture, 15 October 2014 - "Preaching, Politics and Philanthropy: The Quakers in Pharmacy 1650 to 1900" - Lecturer: Dr Stuart Anderson
- 17th Poynter Lecture, 12 October 2016 - "Finding Patients in the Medical Museum" - Lecturer: Sam Alberti.'
- 18th Poynter Lecture, 18 June 2018 - "The Doctor as Collector" - Lecturer: Simon Chaplin.
