= Edwin Clarke =

British physician and historian

Edwin Clarke FRCP
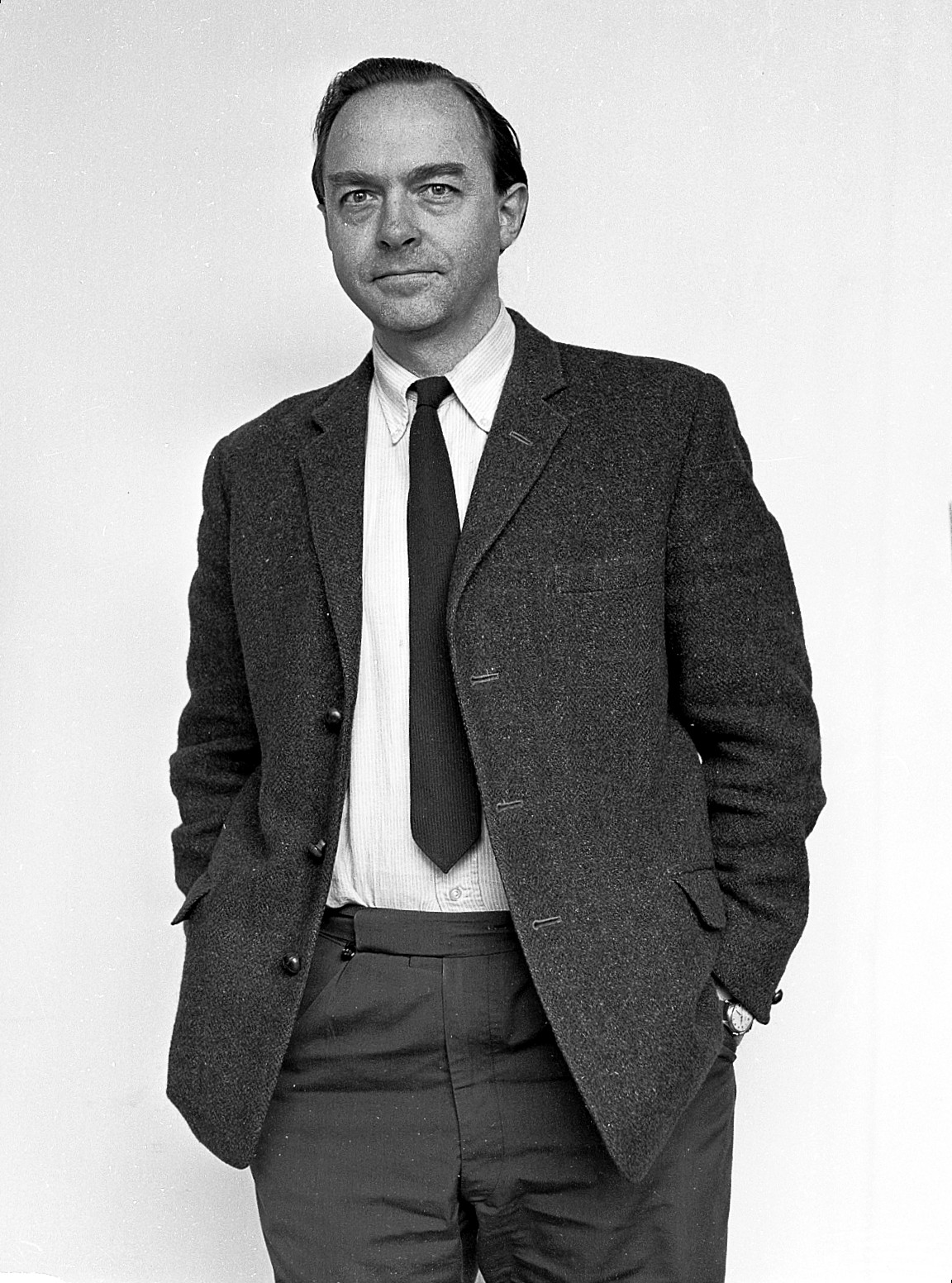
- Portrait of Clarke, Wellcome Trust
- Born: Edwin Sisterton Clarke; 18 June 1919; Felling-on-Tyne, County Durham, England
- Died: 11 April 1996 (aged 76)
- Education: King’s College medical school at the University of Durham
- Occupations: Neurologist; Medical historian
- Medical career
- Institutions: Wellcome Institute for the History of Medicine

Edwin Sisterton Clarke FRCP (18 June 1919 – 11 April 1996) was a British neurologist and medical historian, best remembered for his role as Director of the Wellcome Institute for the History of Medicine, when he succeeded Noël Poynter and oversaw the transfer of the Wellcome museum to the Science museum, helped establish an intercalated BSc degree in the history of medicine for medical students and edited the journal Medical History.

In 1958, Clarke left a career in neurology to pursue one in history of medicine. In 1965, he was a member of the founding committee that established the British Society for the History of Medicine.

His publications included a series of monographs on the history of the neurosciences.

== Early life and education ==
Edwin Clarke was born in Felling-on-Tyne, County Durham, to Joseph Clarke, an artisan. He was educated at Jarrow Central School and subsequently became apprenticed in pharmacy at the dispensary of the Newcastle General Hospital from 1935 to 1938. He simultaneously took evening classes at Rutherford Technical College. In 1939, he gained admission to King's College medical school at the University of Durham, in Newcastle.

== Early medical training and career ==
During the Second World War, a Rockefeller Foundation funded scheme allowed Clarke to travel to the United States as one of around seventy medical students from the United Kingdom chosen to complete fast-track clinical training. In 1943, he began his studies at the University of Chicago, which he completed in 1945. When he returned to Durham in 1945, he took his MB BS and subsequently received his Chicago MD in 1946.

Clarke completed his postgraduate posts at Oxford with Sir Hugh Cairns and E. M. Buzzard, and in the Royal Army Medical Corps for a further two years with a specialism in neurology (1946 to 1948). He subsequently worked for Charles Symonds at the National Hospital, Queen Square before joining Sir John McMichael's medical department as lecturer and consultant neurologist at the Royal Postgraduate Medical School, Hammersmith.

== History of medicine ==
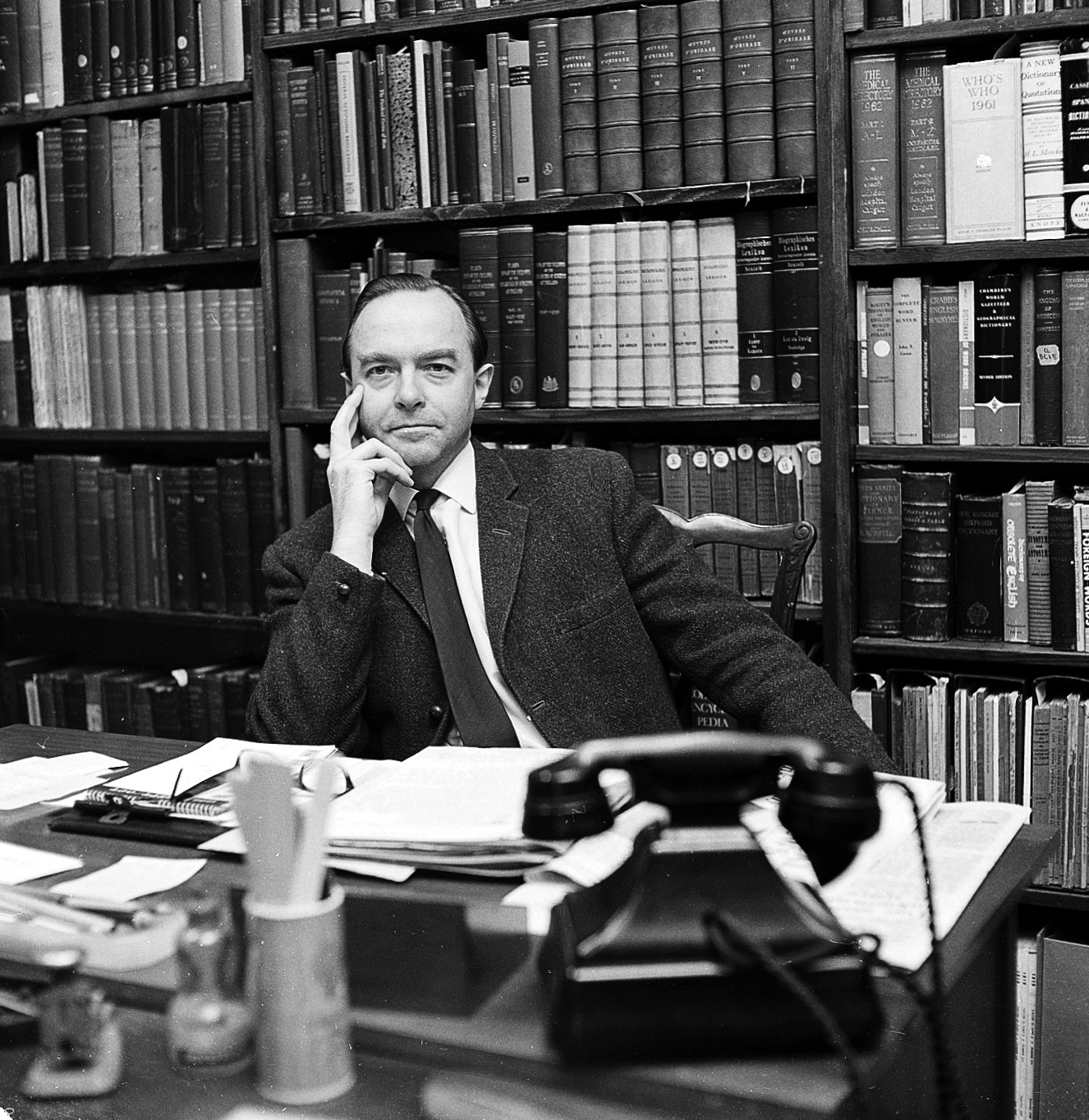
Clarke in the Wellcome Historical Medical Museum and Library

In 1958, Clarke switched career, left clinical work and became assistant scientific secretary to the Wellcome Trust.

Between 1960 and 1962, he spent time at the Institute of the History of Medicine at Johns Hopkins University, followed by some time at the University of California at Los Angeles, and then a year as visiting associate professor at Yale University.

In 1963, Clarke returned to England from the United States and joined the staff of the Wellcome Historical Medical Museum and Library before it became the Wellcome Institute for the History of Medicine.

In 1965, he represented the History of Medicine Society on the committee who established the British Society for the History of Medicine, along with William Copeman, Haldane Philp Tait, K. D. Keele, D. Geraint James, Douglas Guthrie, F. N. L. Poynter and Charles Newman, becoming its first honorary assistant secretary. In 1966, history of medicine was encouraged as an academic subject and the Wellcome Trust appointed Clarke as senior lecturer and head of the sub-department of the history of medicine at University College London.

Clarke researched the structure, functions and diseases of the nervous system and with various co-authors, he created a series of monographs on the history of the neurosciences. In 1971, he edited Modern Methods in the History of Medicine, a collection of essays.

He was not completely at ease with the growing trend to apply a social context to medical history but his work in the history of medicine was still described as "seminal" and his scholarship as exhibiting "timeless qualities of accuracy and care".

In 1973, he succeeded Poynter to become Director of the Wellcome Institute for the History of Medicine, when he oversaw the reorganisation of the Wellcome building at Euston Road, particularly the transfer of the Wellcome museum to the Science museum. At the same time, he also became editor of the journal Medical History and contributed to the establishment of an Intercalated BsC Degree in History of Medicine at University College, providing medical students the chance to study history of medicine in depth, for one year. His desire was to establish history of medicine as an academic discipline and not just interested amateurs. He retired as director in 1979.

== Personal life ==
Clarke was described as "a difficult man to get close to" but as having "impressive rhythm on the dance floor at Institute parties".

He married three times and had two sons and a daughter.

Clarke died on 11 April 1996 from pancreatic carcinoma.

== Selected publications ==
Clarke's books included:

- The Human Brain and Spinal Cord. A historical study illustrated by writings from antiquity to the twentieth century. University of California Press, Berkeley and Los Angeles, 1968. (With C. D. O'Malley)
- Modern Methods in the History of Medicine. Athlone Press, London, 1971.
- Illustrated History of Brain Function. Sandford Publications, Oxford, 1972. (With Kenneth Dewhurst)
- Neuburger, Max. The Historical Development of Experimental Brain and Spinal Cord Physiology before Flourens. Johns Hopkins University Press, Baltimore, 1981. (translator and reviser)
- Nineteenth-century Origins of Neuroscientific Concepts. University of California Press, Berkeley, 1987. (With L. S. Jacyna)
