= John Cule =

Welsh physician

John Cule MBE
- John Cule drawn by a fellow soldier in Italy
- Born: 7 February 1920; Ton Pentre, Rhondda Valley
- Died: 10 April 2015 (aged 95)
- Education: King's College Hospital Medical School
- Known for: Work in mental health in West Wales; President of; British Society for the History of Medicine; Osler Club of London; International Society for the History of Medicine
- Medical career
- Profession: General practitioner; Psychiatrist
- Institutions: Addenbrookes Hospital; King's Cross Hospital; St David's Hospital, Carmarthen; West Wales General Hospital

John Hedley Cule (7 February 1920 – 10 April 2015) was a Welsh physician who worked as a general practitioner and later as a psychiatrist. In 2005, he was awarded a MBE for his work in mental health in West Wales.

His interest in the history of medicine led him to become the editor of the journal Vesalius, lecturer in the history of medicine at the Welsh National School of Medicine and the president of the British Society for the History of Medicine, the Osler Club of London, the International Society for the History of Medicine and the Welsh Society of the History of Medicine.

== Early life ==
John Cule was born on 7 February 1920 in Ton Pentre in the Rhondda Valley, to Walter Edwards Cule, a draper. The eldest of his siblings, he attended the Rhondda Intermediate School for Boys, and then became the chorister in the local chapel at Porth County School.

Subsequently, he attended the Methodist Kingswood School in Bath. Here he was inspired into medicine and its history by the headmaster, A. Barrett Sackett, and as a result in 1938 gained admission to Trinity Hall at the University of Cambridge. He transferred to King's College Hospital Medical School for his clinical training.

== Second World War ==
During the Second World War he attended to the injured during The Blitz and in 1942 he became house physician and casualty officer one year earlier than usual due to the effects of the war.

After gaining his medical degree in 1943, he was commissioned as first lieutenant in the Royal Army Medical Corps on 8 January 1944.

He was posted to the Argyll and Sutherland Highlanders at Crotone in Calabria, Italy. He was forced to learn Italian as his batman, an Italian prisoner of war Marcello Fillini, spoke no English. In 1944, he was promoted to captain and mentioned in dispatches after treating a Royal Army Service Corps driver for a pneumothorax (collapsed lung). In 1945, he was posted to Austria as part of Operation Henpeck.

== Career ==
In 1947, Cule began his surgical training at Addenbrookes Hospital and the following year, his medical training at King's Cross Hospital. Between 1948 and 1971, he worked in general practice in Camberley, Surrey.

Cule retired from general practice in 1972, began to fish on the River Teifi and moved to Capel Dewi in Ceredigion, West Wales. Here he trained as a psychiatrist and worked at St David's Hospital, Carmarthen, and the psychiatric unit of the West Wales General Hospital. He remained in this role until 1986. In 2005 he was awarded an MBE for his work in mental health in West Wales.

== History of medicine ==
In 1962, Cule joined the Worshipful Society of Apothecaries as a liveryman, and two years later became a freeman of the City of London.

In the late 1970s, he became lecturer in the history of medicine at the Welsh National School of Medicine and a fellow of the Faculty of the History of Medicine and Pharmacy at the Society of Apothecaries.

He became a member of the international committee of the International Society for the History of Medicine and edited its chief journal Vesalius and became its world president in 1998. He became president of the British Society for the History of Medicine in 1986. In addition, he was president of the Osler Club of London, the International Society for the History of Medicine and the Welsh Society of the History of Medicine.

== Family and personal ==
Cule married nurse Joyce Leslie Bonser in 1944 and they had two sons, Simon and Peter, and a daughter Myfanwy. He sent his sons to the same school that he had attended for sixth form, in Bath. His hobbies included fishing, and later, driving ponies. In 1979, he qualified for the scurry driving at the Horse of the Year Show.

== Death ==
Cule died on 10 April 2015, at the age of 95 and six years after his wife. At the time of his death, he resided at Abereinon, Capel Dewi, Llandysul, Ceredigion.

== Selected publications ==
- Wreath on The Crown: The Story Of Sarah Jacob, The Welsh Fasting Girl. Gomerian Press Llandysul, 1967.
- Wales and Medicine. Gomer Press, 1975. (Editor) ISBN 0850882605
- A Doctor for the People: 2000 Years of General Practice in Britain. Update Books, London, 1980.
- Wales and Medicine: Source List for Printed Books and Papers Showing the History of Medicine in Relation to Wales and Welshmen. National Library of Wales, 1980. ISBN 0901833908
- Child Care Through the Centuries: An Historical Survey from Papers Given at the Tenth British Congress on the History of Medicine. STS Publications, Cardiff, 1986. ISBN 0948917008
- Russia and Wales: Essays on the History of State Involvement in Health Care. History of Medicine Society of Wales. (Editor with J. M. Lancaster) ISBN 0952348101
