= Jesús Prieto =

Spanish medical doctor and scientist

Jesús Prieto Valtueña
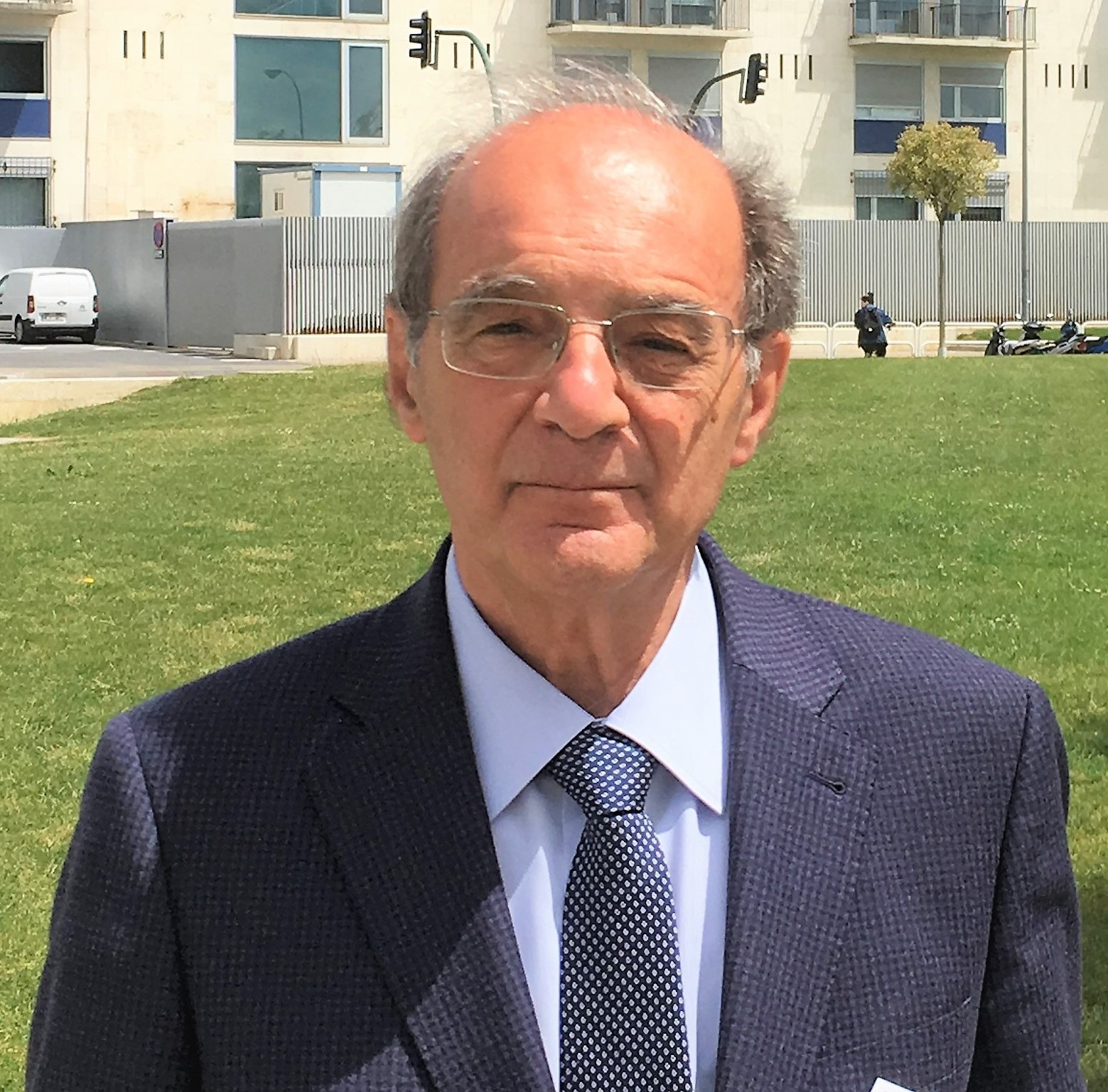
- Born: Jesús Prieto Valtueña; 6 April 1944; Oviedo, Spain
- Education: University of Valladolid
- Awards: National Prize for Medical Research Gregorio Marañón (Spain, 2014)
- Scientific career
- Fields: Hepatology

Jesus M. Prieto (born 6 April 1944, Oviedo, Spain) is a Spanish medical doctor and scientist who is at present Emeritus Professor of Medicine at the University of Navarra.

== Biography ==
He studied at the University of Valladolid where he obtained the degree in Medicine in 1967 and the PhD degree in 1969. He specialized in Internal Medicine and Gasteoenterology at the University Hospital of Valladolid and in Hepatology at the Royal Free Hospital of London (1972–73) where he was Research Fellow in the Department of Professor Sheila Sherlock. In 1976 he was appointed Associated Professor of Medicine of the University of Oviedo and in 1977 he obtained the Chair of Medicine of the University of Santiago de Compostela (Galicia, Spain) being designated Director of the Department of Medicine of the General Hospital of Galicia. In 1979 he was appointed full Professor of Medicine of the University of Navarra, Director of the Department of Medicine of the Clinic University of Navarra and Director of the Division of Hepatology and Gene Therapy of the Center for Applied Medical Research (CIMA). Since 2014 he is Emeritus Professor of Medicine of the University of Navarra and is in charge of a laboratory at CIMA which is dedicated to do research in cancer gene therapy and to the training of young African scientists.

== Honors ==
- Former President of the Spanish Association for the Study of the Liver (AEEH)
- Former Member of the Scientific Committee of the European Association for the Study of the Liver (EASL)
- Founder member of the Spanish Society of Gene Therapy
- Former Member of the Scientific Committee of the French Agency for Research on AIDS and Hepatitis C
- Former President of the International Committee of the American Society of Gene Therapy
- He has been member of the editorial board of diversity of prominent medical journals in the field of Gastroenterology, Hepatology and Gene Therapy.

== Prizes and Recognitions ==
- Spanish National Prize of Medical Research (2014)
- Recognition Award of the European Association for the Study of the Liver (2013)
- Gold Medal of the University of Navarra (2015)
- Doctor “Honoris Causa” of the University of Porto (Portugal) (2001)
- Doctor “Honoris Causa” of the University Austral (Buenos Aires, Argentina) (2012)
- Great Prize Bial Foundation of Medical Research (Lisbon, 2005)

== Publications and professional achievements ==
He has published more than 400 papers in high-rank international scientific journals and has directed more than 50 doctoral thesis and submitted an important number of patents. He has conducted several clinical trials with innovative therapies pertaining treatment of liver cirrhosis and gene therapy of liver cancer and monogenic liver diseases.
