= BSHM =

BSHM may refer to:

- British Society for the History of Mathematics
- British Society for the History of Medicine
