= World Association of Sarcoidosis and other Granulomatous Disorders =

- Nickname: WASOG
- Founder: D. Geraint James
- Founded at: Milan, Italy
- Website: www.wasog.org

The World Association of Sarcoidosis and other Granulomatous Disorders, also known as WASOG, is an organisation of physicians involved in the diagnosis and treatment of sarcoidosis and related conditions. It was co-founded by D. Geraint James, who had set up the first international conference on sarcoidosis almost 30 years earlier at the Brompton Hospital.
