= Charles J. S. Thompson =

British physician and writer

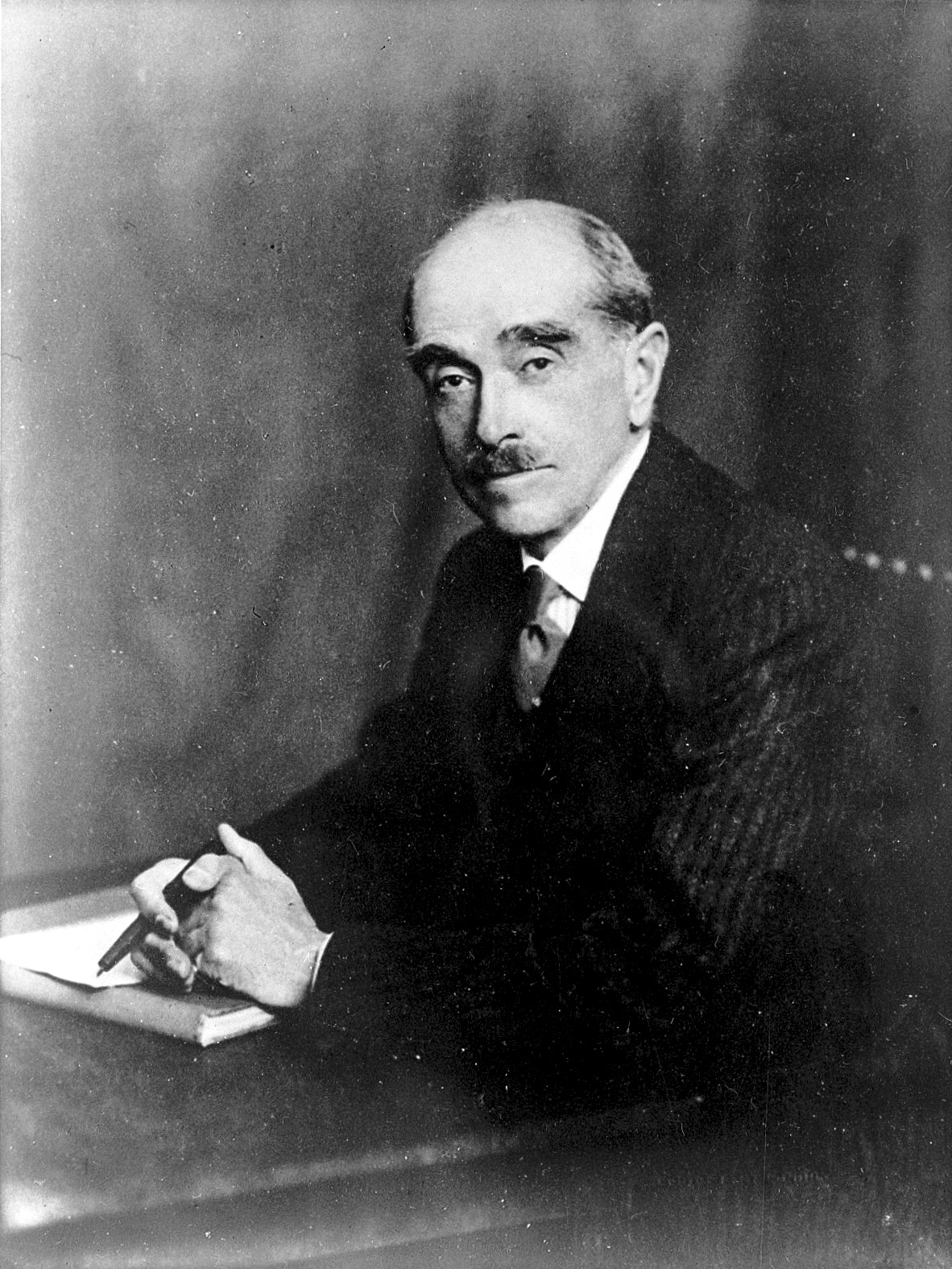
C. J. S. Thompson

Charles John Samuel Thompson (27 August 1862 – 14 July 1943) MBE was a British physician and writer.

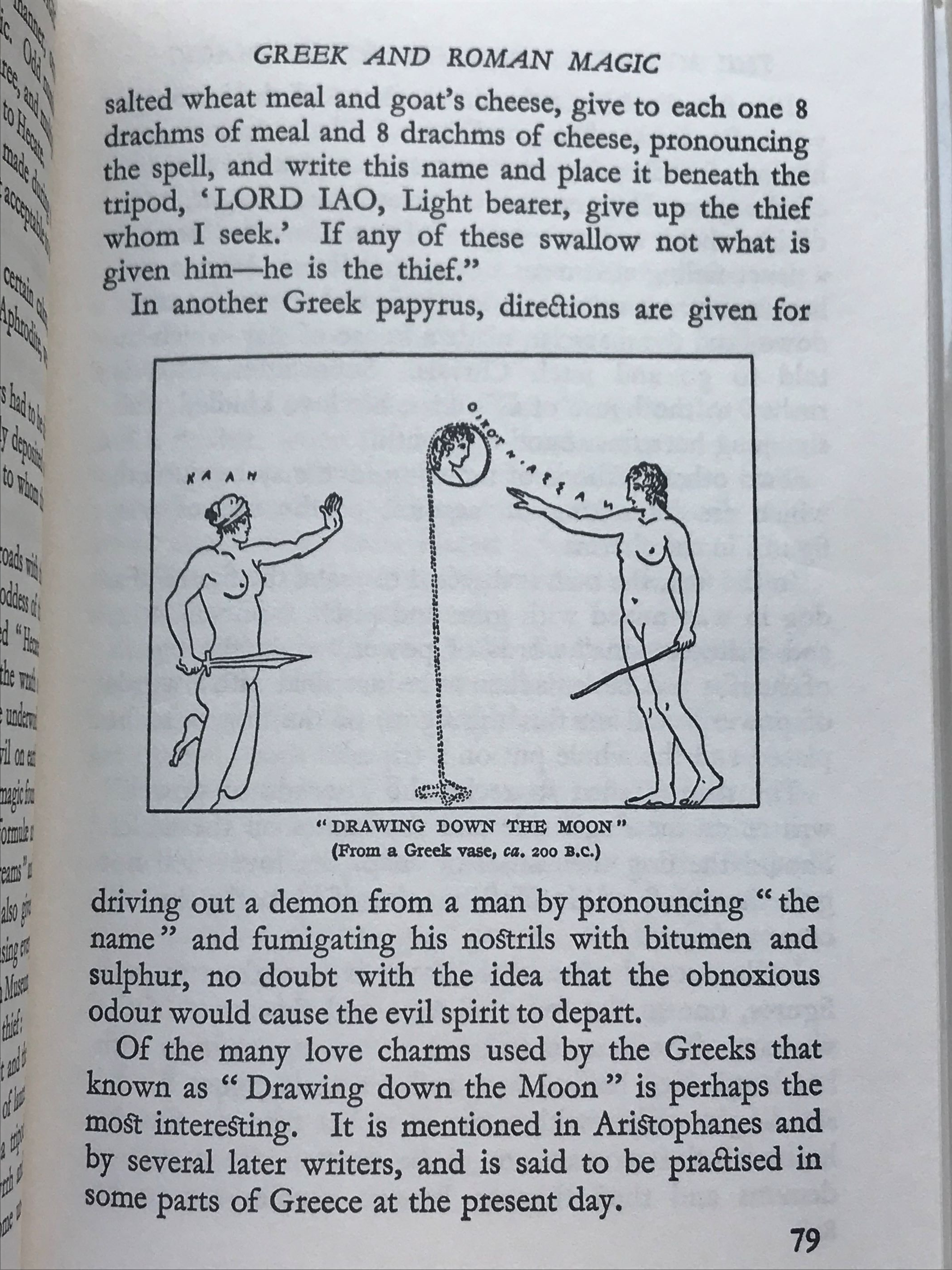
"The Mysteries and Secrets of Magic"

Thompson was educated at University of Liverpool where he studied chemistry and pharmacy. In 1909 he became the curator for the Wellcome Institute for the History of Medicine. In 1927 he was elected by the Royal College of Surgeons of England as honorary curator of the Historical Section at their museum in Lincoln's Inn Fields. Most of the collection was destroyed during World War II attacks in May 1941.

He was well educated in toxicology and was the author of the book Poisons and Poisoners (1931). He was a member of the Royal Society of Medicine.

== Publications ==
- Practical Dispensing for Students, Pharmaceutical and Medical (1891)
- The Hand of Destiny: Folklore and Superstition for Everyday Life (1893)
- The Mystery and Romance of Alchemy and Pharmacy (1897)
- Notes on Pharmacy and Dispensing for Nurses (1898)
- Poison Romance and Poison Mysteries (1899)
- Zorastro, A Romance (1899) as "Creswick J Thompson"
- Poison Mysteries in History, Romance and Crime (1924)
- The Mystery and Lure of Perfume (1927)
- The Mysteries & Secrets of Magic (1927)
- Quacks of Old London (1928)
- The Art of the Apothecary (1929)
- The Mystery and Lore of Monsters (1930)
- Poisons and Poisoners (1931)
- Alchemy and Alchemists (1932)
- The Mystic Mandrake (1934)
- The Mysteries of Sex: Women Who Posed as Men and Men Who Impersonated Women (1938)
- History and Evolution of Surgical Instruments (1942)
