= Medical History (journal) =

- Language: English
- Edited by: Tara Alberts

Publication details
- History: 1957–present
- Publisher: Cambridge University Press
- Frequency: 4 issues per year
- Open access: Yes
- Impact factor: 1.1 (2025)

Standard abbreviations
- ISO 4: Med. Hist.

Indexing
- CODEN: MDHIAA
- ISSN: 0025-7273 (print); 2048-8343 (web)
- LCCN: 59035674
- OCLC no.: 715771375

Links
- Journal homepage; Online access

Medical History is a peer-reviewed academic journal covering the history of medicine. It was established in 1957. After many decades of funding by the Wellcome Trust, ownership of the journal passed to Cambridge University Press in about 2011. The editor-in-chief is Tara Alberts (University of York).

== History ==
Medical History was founded in 1957, published by William Dawson, and was the official journal of four medical societies; the Cambridge University History of Medicine Society, the Norwegian Society for the History of Medicine, the Scottish Society of the History of Medicine, and the Osler Club of London. Its first editor was William John Bishop, the then librarian of the Wellcome Historical Medical Library. Following Bishop's death in 1961, Noël Poynter became the journal's editor.

In 1965, Medical History became the official publication of the newly formed British Society for the History of Medicine (BSHM), an umbrella organisation encompassing the smaller societies. The last issue affiliated with the BSHM was in 1973. From 1974, the "BSHM" no longer appeared on the title page. Edwin Sisterton Clarke took over as editor following Poynter's retirement in 1973. In 1980, Vivian Nutton and W. F. Bynum jointly took over as editors. From 1 December 1980 the journal was administered by Science History Publications Ltd., in Buckinghamshire. The following year, a new cover was designed by Peter Voce. Vivian Nutton noted in 2007 that the journal had gone through four designs of its cover, several changes of its subtitle and "most striking" was the variations in the editorial board, described as "largely dormant and partly fictional" in the 1970s. In 2024, the editorial board still consisted of 45 members. In the 1980s, professional medical historians, women and people from abroad would replace the mainly retired medical men. In 2006 the journal became the official journal of the European Association for the History of Medicine and Health.

In 2000 the medical historian Anne Hardy replaced Nutton as editor and Harold Cook, Director of the Wellcome Trust Centre at UCL, took over from Bynum as chief editor in 2002. The Wellcome Trust Centre for the History of Medicine at University College London became fully responsible for the journal from 2005, when it also became available online via PubMed Central as a diamond Open Access publication supported by the Wellcome Trust. Medical History has continued to be freely available at the PubMed Central website from 2005 until the present.
