= Zachary Cope =

Sir Vincent Zachary Cope MD MS FRCS
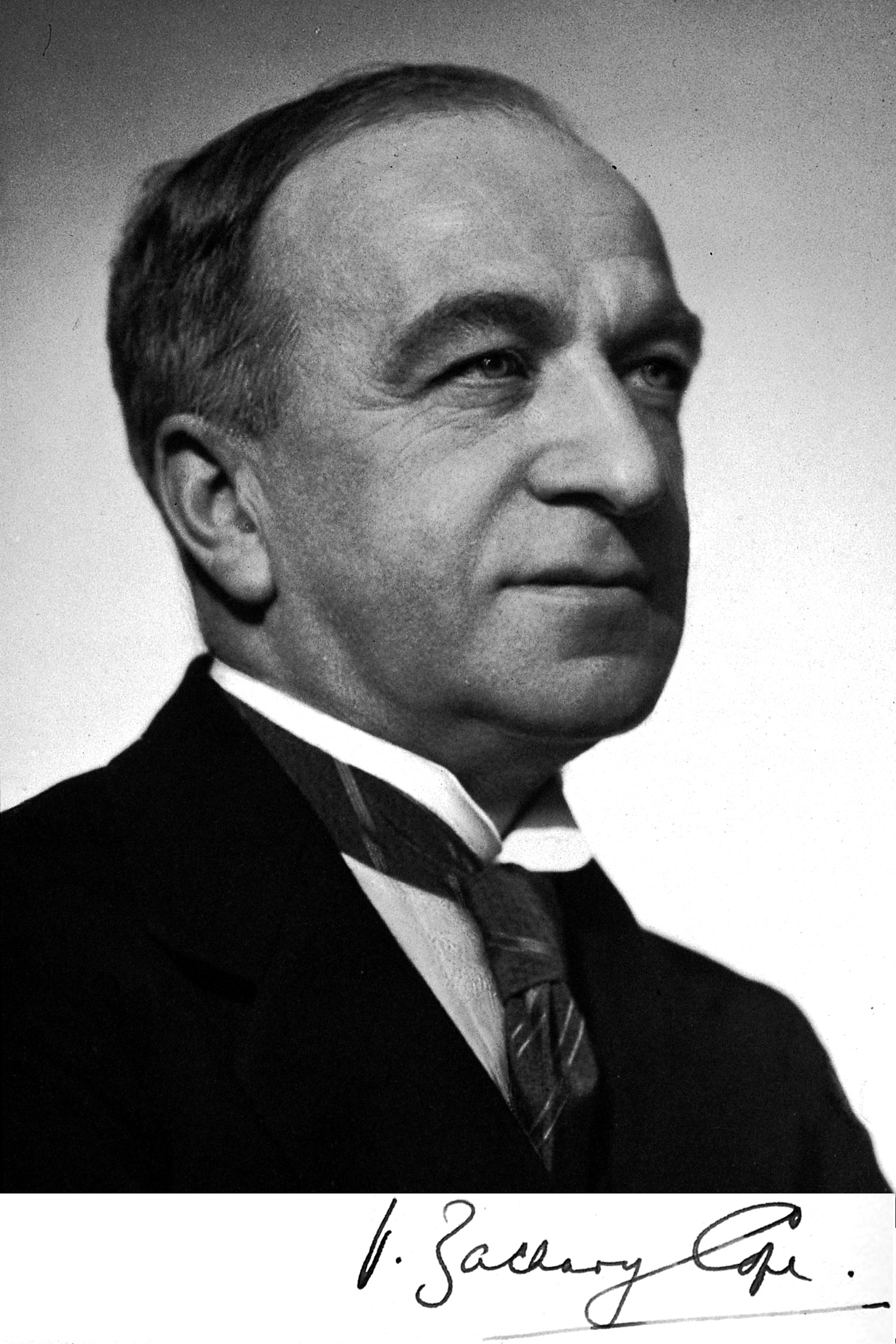
- Born: 14 February 1881; Kingston upon Hull, East Yorkshire, England
- Died: 28 December 1974 (aged 93); Oxford, Oxfordshire, England
- Education: Westminster City School; University of London
- Occupations: Surgeon, medical historian
- Employers: St Mary's Hospital, London (1911–?); Bolingbroke Hospital (1912–1946); RAMC (1916–1918)
- Notable work: Cope's Early Diagnosis of the Acute Abdomen; The Diagnosis of the Acute Abdomen in Rhyme
- Title: MB BS (1905); Kt (1953); FRCS; MD; MS Lond.
- Spouse(s): Agnes Dora Newth (1909–1922, her death); Alice May Watts (1923–1944, her death)
- Children: One daughter
- Parent(s): Thomas John Gilbert Cope; Celia Ann Cope née Truscott

Sir Vincent Zachary Cope MD MS FRCS (14 February 1881 – 28 December 1974) was an English physician, surgeon, author, historian and poet perhaps best known for authoring the book Cope's Early Diagnosis of the Acute Abdomen from 1921 until 1971. The work remains a respected and standard text of general surgery, and new editions continue being published by editors long after his death, the most recent one being the 22nd edition, published in 2010. Cope also wrote widely on the history of medicine and of public dispensaries.

== Early life ==
Cope was the youngest of ten children of a minister, Thomas John Cope and his wife Celia Anne Crowle. He was head boy at Westminster City School where he was awarded a gold medal in 1899 and then a scholarship to go to St Mary's Hospital Medical School. He passed surgery and forensic medicine with distinction in 1905 and became house physician to David Lees, author of The Abdominal Inflammations. Lees influenced Cope in his lifelong interest, the acute abdomen.

== Surgical career ==
In 1906, Cope began work at Bolingbroke Hospital before joining the Royal Army Medical Corps in 1914. In 1916 he went to Baghdad, Mesopotamia. It was here that he wrote his first book Surgical aspects of dysentery published in 1921. Cope was considered an "eminent authority" on acute abdominal disorders. Influenced by Augustus D Waller and Almroth Wright, he published many books including Cope's Early Diagnosis of the Acute Abdomen also in 1921.

Cope is quoted to have said that "the good surgeon must feel for his patients, but never let this sympathy disturb his judgement or treatment".

Cope is recorded to have been a small man who stood on a stool, named 'Cope's stool' when operating.

== Ministry of Health ==
Involved in surveying hospital facilities, medical staffing levels and auxiliary training, Cope was active in chairing committees for the Ministry of Health and in editing their reports between 1949 and 1952. He received a knighthood for the work he completed on medicine and surgery in the official medical history of the Second World War.

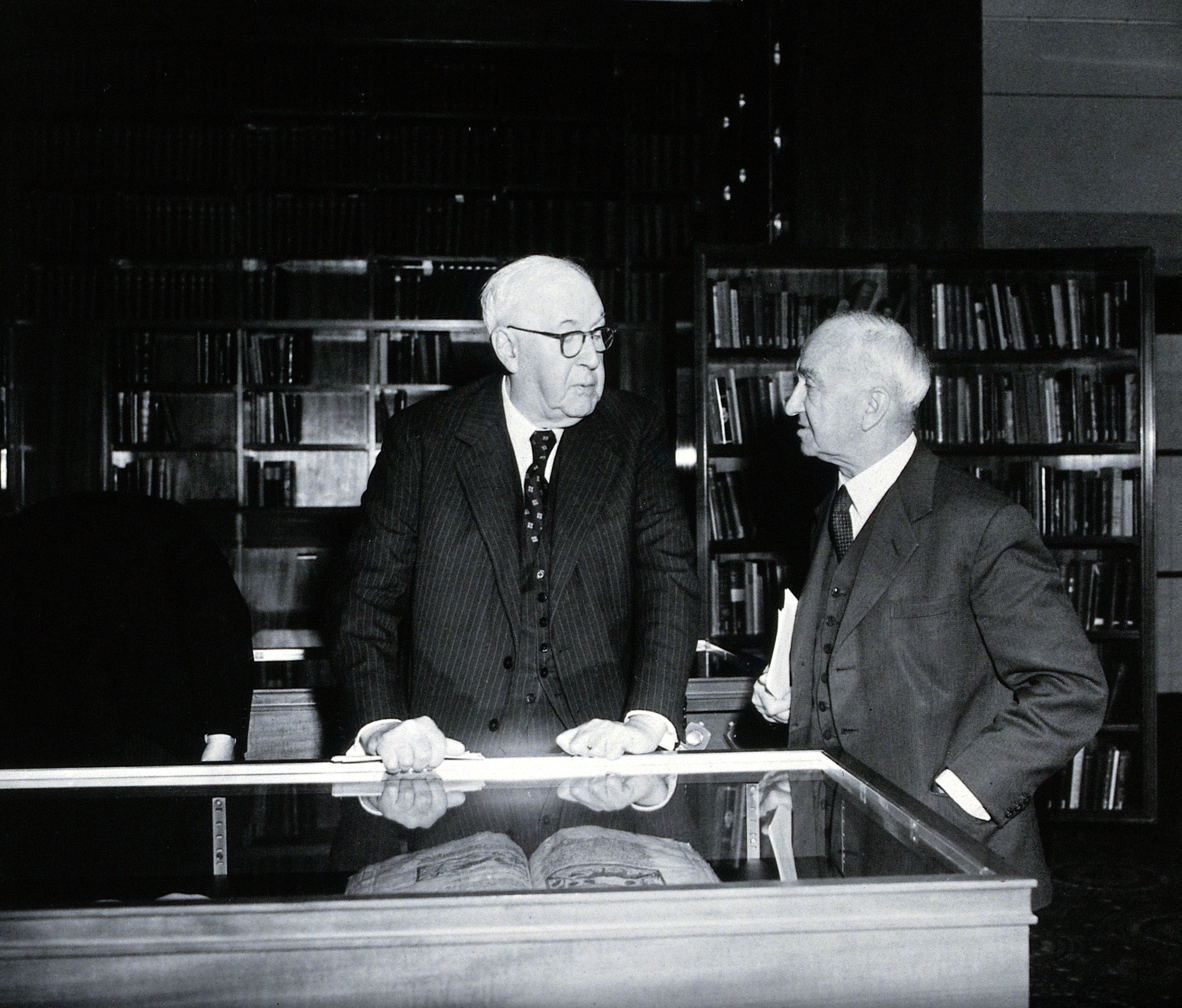
Sir Henry Hallett Dale (left) and Sir Zachary Cope, 1962.

== Notable works ==
- 1921 – Early Diagnosis of the Acute Abdomen
- 1939 – Pioneers in Acute Abdominal Surgery – Oxford
- 1947 – The Diagnosis of the Acute Abdomen in Rhyme (under the pseudonym Zeta)
- 1954 – The History of St Mary's Hospital Medical School, Paddington
- 1955 – A Hundred Years of Nursing at St. Mary's Hospital, Paddington
- 1957 – Sidelights on the History of Medicine
- 1959 – The Royal College of Surgeons of England, a history
- 1961 – Some Famous General practitioners and other Medical Historical Essays.
- 1965 – A History of the Acute Abdomen

Between the ages of 75 years and 85 years, Cope wrote seven biographies including William Cheselden, Florence Nightingale, Almroth Wright and Sir John Tomes.

== Personal life ==
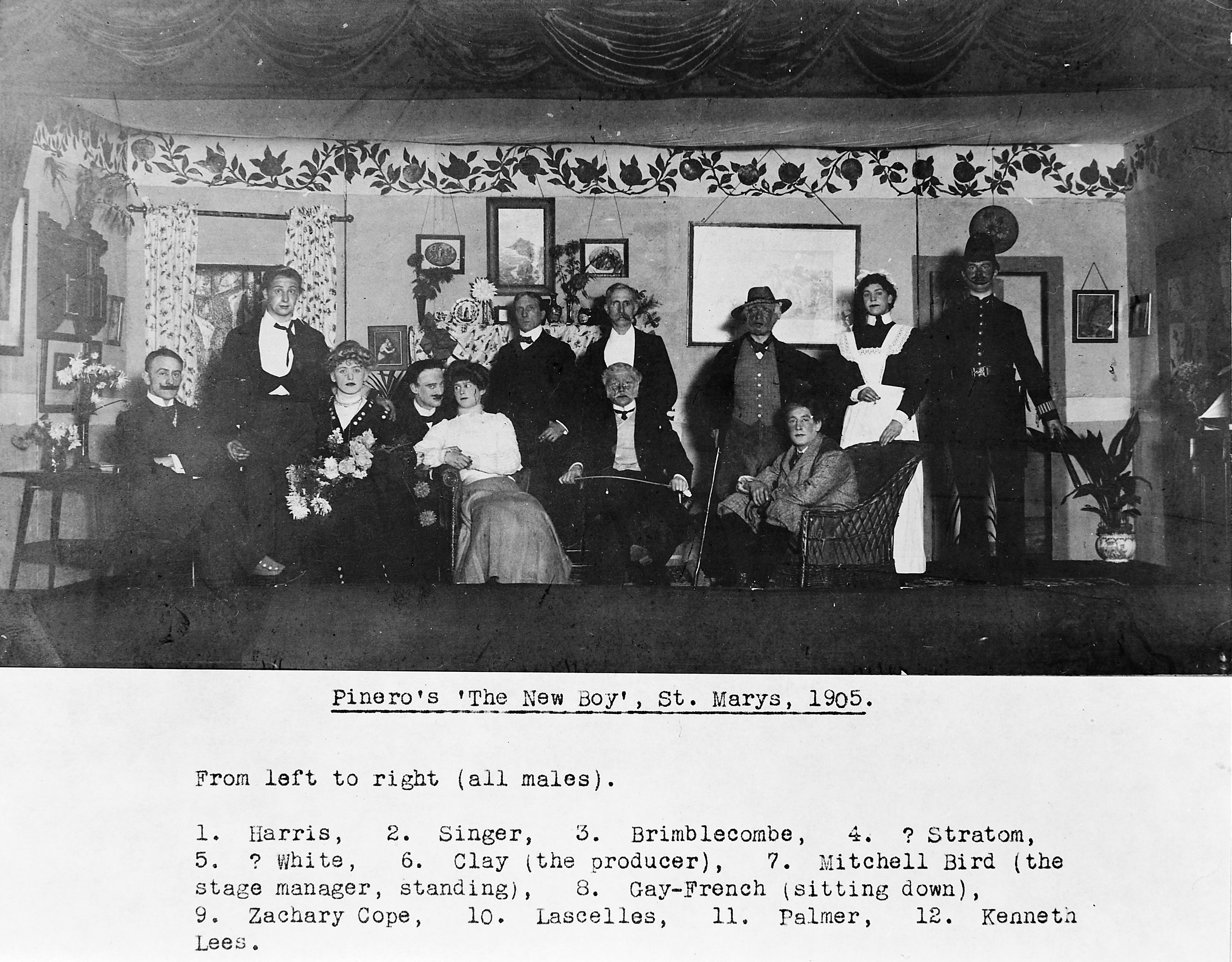
The cast of a play produced at St. Mary's Hospital in 1905

Described as "modest and friendly", Cope was also "devoted to his family and loved by his friends". He outlived two wives, the first, Dora Newth, dying very young. He married Alice Mary Watts in 1923 and had a daughter.

Cope lived near Hampstead Heath until the death of Alice in 1944 after which he moved to Chiltern Court, Baker Street. He is remembered to spend much time in the library of the RSM after retirement. Between 1950 and 1952, he was president of the Osler Club of London.

== Legacy ==
St Mary's Hospital, London has a ward named after Cope.

The Royal college of surgeons pays tribute to Cope with the Zachary Cope Memorial Lecture in abdominal surgical disease.
