= Sheila Sherlock =

British physician and educator (1918–2001)

Professor Dame Sheila Sherlock DBE FRS FRCP FRCPE
- Sheila Sherlock
- Born: Sheila Patricia Violet Sherlock; 31 March 1918; Dublin, Ireland
- Died: 30 December 2001 (aged 83); London, England
- Education: University of Edinburgh
- Known for: Hepatology
- Spouse: D. Geraint James (m. 1951)
- Children: 2
- Awards: DBE (1978); FRCP (1951); FRCP Ed; FRS (2001)
- Scientific career
- Fields: Medicine
- Workplaces: Royal Free Hospital
- Thesis: The liver in disease: with special reference to aspiration liver biopsy

Dame Sheila Patricia Violet Sherlock (31 March 1918 – 30 December 2001) was a British physician and medical educator who is considered the major 20th-century contributor to the field of hepatology (the study of the liver).

== Early life ==
Sheila Sherlock was born in Dublin on 31 March 1918, the only daughter of Violet Mary Catherine (née Beckett) and Samuel Philip Sherlock, an army officer then serving as a lieutenant in the 1st Cavalry Reserve.

Her family moved from Ireland to London soon after her birth, and she attended private schools in the city until her family moved in 1929 to the village of Sandgate, Kent. In Kent, she was educated at the Folkestone County School for Girls. In the early part of the twentieth century, female applicants to medical schools were at a great disadvantage, and from 1935 to 1936, Sherlock attempted to enter several English medical schools but was rejected. In 1936, she was accepted for a place to study medicine at the University of Edinburgh. Her ability became evident, and she graduated in 1941, finishing top of her year. She was awarded the Ettles Scholarship, being only the second woman to have done so.

== Career ==
She remained in Edinburgh to take up the post of Assistant Lecturer in Surgery offered to her by Professor Sir James Learmonth, and published her first paper with Learmonth in 1942. She later recounted that Learmonth had taught her how to conduct and document research. In the same year she was appointed House Physician to Professor Sir John McMichael at the Royal Postgraduate Medical School, Hammersmith Hospital.

In this post she worked on hepatitis, which she was able to continue from 1943 to 1947 with funding from the Medical Research Council and subsequently with the award of the Beit Memorial Fellowship. She was awarded her MD with a thesis on The Liver in Disease: with special reference to aspiration liver biopsy, receiving a Gold Medal from University of Edinburgh.

She conducted research into portal hypertension, hepatic encephalopathy and ascites at this time. In 1947 she spent a year at Yale University's School of Medicine as a Rockefeller Travelling Fellow, working on carbohydrate metabolism and liver disease. She returned to London and in 1948 was appointed Lecturer in Medicine and Consultant Physician at Hammersmith Hospital. In 1951, aged 33, she was elected as a Fellow of the Royal College of Physicians, making her, at the time, the youngest woman to receive this qualification.

In 1959, she became the United Kingdom's first ever female professor of medicine when she was appointed at the Royal Free Hospital School of Medicine in London. She founded the liver unit which was located in a temporary wooden structure on the roof of the hospital in Gray's Inn Road. Despite its location, the department attracted trainees from around the world, and many current leaders in the field of hepatology spent time there. Research in several different areas of liver disease was undertaken: including; bilirubin metabolism, haemochromatosis, cholestasis, drug-induced liver disease, albumin synthesis, portal hypertension and ascites, autoimmune liver disease and its treatment with corticosteroids, and the use of liver biopsy in the diagnosis of liver disease were all studied. In 1974 the department moved to the new hospital in Hampstead, where it was situated close to the clinical wards, on the 10th floor. Research continued there, with viral hepatitis, liver transplantation and endoscopic treatment of varices all becoming important areas of study. She retired from the Chair of Medicine in 1983, but continued to see patients, conduct research, and write. At the Royal Free, she was succeeded by Neil McIntyre.

=== Affiliations ===
- Co-founder (with Hans Popper) and president, International Association for the Study of the Liver (1958–1962)
- Councillor (1964–1968), Censor (1970–72), Senior Censor and Vice President (1976–77) Royal College of Physicians – Sherlock was the first female vice president of the Royal College of Physicians
- President, British Society of Gastroenterology (1973)
- Member of Senate, University of London (1976–77)
- Founder, and later President, British Liver Trust (1988–2001)
- Founder, American Association for the Study of Liver Disease

She delivered several of the Royal College of Physicians lectures including the Bradshaw Lecture (1961), Humphry Davy Rolleston (1968) and Lumleian Lectures (1978) and Harveian Oration (1985).

=== Publications ===
Sherlock was known as a clear and succinct writer, and she published over 600 papers in scientific journals. Her most widely known book, Diseases of the Liver and Biliary System, was first published in 1955. It was written solely by her until the 9th edition in 1993, and is now in its 14th edition as of December/2026. She was also editor of Gut and the Journal of Hepatology.

== Awards and honours ==
- Buckston Browne Prize (1953)
- William Cullen Prize (1962) (shared)
- Honorary member of the gastroenterological societies of; United States (1963), Australasia (1965), Mexico (1968), Czechoslovakia (1968), Yugoslavia (1981), Sweden (1983)
- Honorary Member, Association of American Physicians (1973)
- Honorary Member, Association Alimentary Surgeons (1973)
- Dame Commander of the Order of the British Empire (DBE) (1978)
- Jimenez-Diaz Prize (1980)
- Thannhauser Prize, (1980)
- Fothergill Gold Medal, Medical Society of London (1983)
- Gold Medal, British Medical Association (1985)
- Honorary doctorate for being an outstanding personality in the fields of clinical and experimental hepatology, University Medical Center, Johannes Gutenberg University, Mainz (1991)
- Honorary Member, Alpha Omega Alpha association (1992)
- Elected as a Fellow of the Royal Society (FRS) (May 2001)
- Honorary Fellow of the Royal Australasian College of Physicians (1984), Royal College of Physicians and Surgeons (1986), Royal Colleges of Surgeons (1989), American College of Physicians, Royal College of Physicians of Canada, Royal College of Physicians of Ireland
- Honorary degrees; DSc, City University of New York (1977), Yale University (1983), University of Edinburgh (1985), University of London (1989), University of Cambridge (1995), MD, University of Lisbon (1981), University of Oslo (1981), University of Leuven (1984), Autonomous University of Barcelona (1991), University of Mainz (1991), Trinity College, Dublin (1992), University of Valladolid (1994), University of Wisconsin (1995), University of Santiago, Chile (1995), University of Padua (1996), University of Toronto (1996), University of Oviedo (1998), LLD, University of Aberdeen (1982)

== Personal life ==
On 15 December 1951, Sherlock married Dr Geraint "Gerry" James, a physician and researcher into sarcoidosis. They had two daughters Amanda and Auriole, and two granddaughters.

Although occasionally referred to as Mrs Sheila James she generally preferred to be known by her maiden name, and was one of the first female professionals to follow this pattern.

On 30 December 2001, Sherlock died in London from pulmonary fibrosis, two weeks after her golden wedding anniversary. Her daughter Amanda, a Baptist minister, conducted her funeral.

== Legacy ==
When Sherlock started her medical career, little was known about liver disease. Her work helped to establish hepatology as a medical specialty. She pioneered the use of needle liver biopsy, which had been used purely as a research tool, based on the technique of Sir John McMichael. Her approach improved the understanding of the pathology of liver disease and it continues to be used in the diagnosis of liver diseases today. The liver unit that she set up at the Royal Free Hospital became the centre for both research into liver disease and the education of trainees in the specialty.

In 1966, she developed, with Deborah Doniach of the Middlesex Hospital, the standard test for Primary Biliary Cirrhosis and later showed that it was an autoimmune disease. She also demonstrated the efficacy of corticosteroid therapy for autoimmune hepatitis. She also recognised the link between hepatitis B and hepatocellular carcinoma.

In 2006, the Sheila Sherlock Prizes were founded with a donation from her husband, Dr Geraint James. The two prizes are awarded to the highest achieving medical students at the UCL Medical School.

In March 2008, on the 90th anniversary of her birth, the liver unit which she had founded at the Royal Free Hospital, was renamed the Sheila Sherlock Liver Centre in her memory.

Professor Priscilla Kincaid-Smith, nephrologist said of her:—

"She was a superb clinician; we all used to go to Sheila's round. She'd be as rude as anything to you on the round – really pick you out and say, 'That's absolute rubbish,' and walk on to the next patient. But she was tremendous, a really wonderful clinician."

=== Criticism ===
In Human guinea pigs Dr. Maurice Henry Pappworth criticises Prof. Sherlock. He explains he felt she was conducting experiments on patients which she knew to be harmful an example give is that she wrote 'It is dangerous to give amino-acids such as methionine, which are toxic, to patients with liver disease. ... Patients in impending coma are extremely sensitive to sedatives. If the patient is uncontrollable half the usual dose of pentobarbital may be given: morphia is absolutely contraindicated, Drugs known to induce hepatic coma such as ammonium sals, ammonium-exchange resins, methionine, urea and diamond are disallowed' in the British Medical Bulletin in 1957 but then went on to conduct an experiment in which those with liver disease morphine.
