= A History of Medicine =

1945 medical textbook by Douglas Guthrie

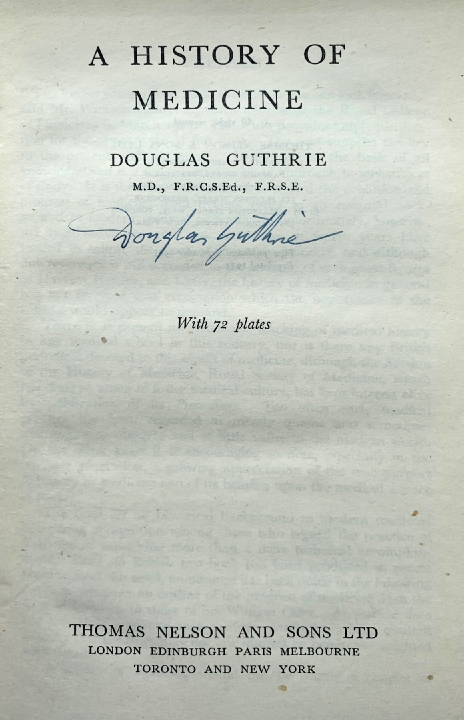
- Author: Douglas Guthrie
- Language: English
- Subject: History of medicine
- Published: 1945
- Publisher: Thomas Nelson and Sons Limited
- Publication place: UK
- Pages: 448

A History of Medicine is a book by Scottish surgeon Douglas Guthrie that was published in 1945 by Thomas Nelson and Sons. It came to wide attention after it was reviewed by the playwright George Bernard Shaw and marked the beginning for Guthrie of a new career in teaching the history of medicine.

== Aim ==
Guthrie's objective was to bring to a wide audience and in chronological order, the past achievements in the history of medicine, from Imhotep to William Osler.

== Contents ==
The first edition of the book consisted of 20 chapters, 448 pages and 72 plates, beginning with "The Genesis of Medicine" and ending with a chapter focussed on medical journalism.

In the preface, Guthrie paid tribute to his mentor, the Scottish physician John Comrie, who had introduced him to the subject of medical history, Alexander Miles who "read the original manuscript and supplied much helpful criticism in the early stages of the work", the librarian of the Royal Society of Medicine G. F. Home and to J. C. Corson from Edinburgh University Library who prepared the index.

== Publication ==
After 10 years' research, the book was published in 1945, the same year that Guthrie retired from clinical work. It was published in Britain by Thomas Nelson and Sons, and later in an American edition. Translations followed in Spanish (1947), German (1952) and Italian (1966).

== Reception ==
The book received at least 53 English-language reviews which Guthrie kept in a scrapbook which was passed to his friend Haldane Philp Tait and is now (2019) in the collections of the Lothian Health Service Archive.

Nearly all of the reviews were positive and the book was favourably compared with the few contemporary general histories of medicine then available, particularly Charles Singer's A Short History of Medicine and Garrison's An introduction to the History of Medicine.

The British Medical Journal and The Lancet gave favourable reviews and the Journal of the American Medical Association recommended it to all physicians, but the Bulletin of the History of Medicine responded more critically, identifying a number of inaccurate names and dates. This intense criticism came from George Rosen, who was of the opinion that Guthrie should have included social context. Guthrie's response, as documented in his scrapbook, described it as "the only really adverse criticism, obviously by a disgruntled reviewer who thinks he could have done better himself".

The book came to wider attention following a 3,000-word review by George Bernard Shaw in The Observer. Shaw wrote, "I am floored by the extraordinary discrepancy between his [Guthrie's] knowledge and my knowledge ... Dr Guthrie's job of packing it [the history of medicine] into 400 pages is learnedly and readably done". Shaw did criticise Guthrie for his omission of practitioners of alternative medicine including osteopaths, herbalists and homoeopaths, which Shaw believed was because "Dr Guthrie either does not know about them or considers them beneath the dignity of a history of medicine". Guthrie's response was that Shaw had provided an unconventional yet entertaining book review. Aware that Shaw's review had greatly increased the profile and popularity of the book he modestly wrote that "many who had no particular interest in the topic or the author, bought the book just because GBS [Shaw] had reviewed it; they had no special interest in the subject and none needless to say, in the author".

Shaw's review was then published in the New York Journal-American, an American daily newspaper which brought the book to the attention of a large readership in the United States.

In 1956, Guthrie wrote an article "On Writing a History of Medicine", which was then included in his book, Janus in the Doorway (1963). This book also included chapters on "The Value of Reviews" and "Hints for Historiographers".

Following reprints in 1945, 1946 and 1947, and American, Spanish and German versions, a new and revised British edition was published in 1958. Most of the revisions were made by amendments to the text but some of the more lengthy notes were collected at the end of the book as a ten-page supplement. This revised book was reprinted in 1960.

This critical acclaim made Guthrie's name well known in history of medicine circles around the world. He made lecture tours, based on the book, to Central America (1949), Africa (1951–1952), Australasia (1953) and the United States in 1954, 1957 and 1961.
