= Osler Club of London =

Medical society

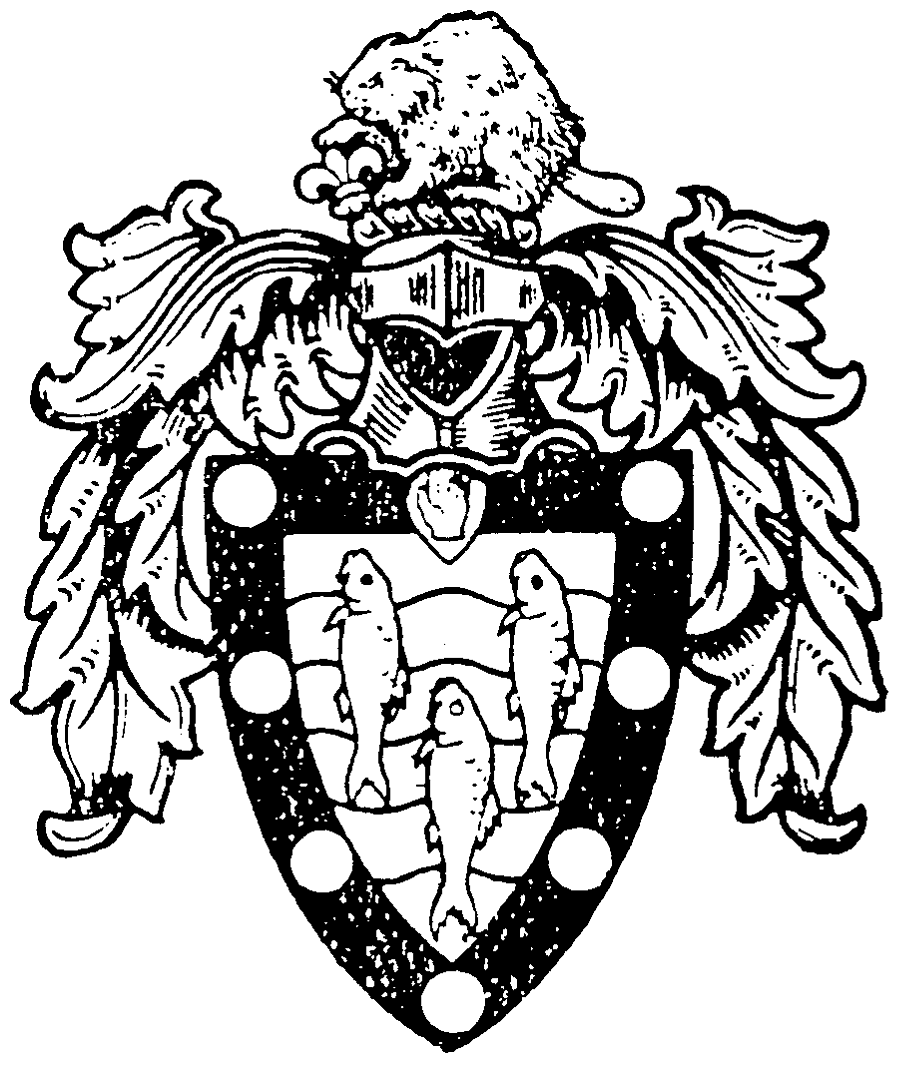
- Coat of arms of Sir William Osler
- Named after: Sir William Osler
- Established: 1928
- Founders: Alfred White Franklin and Walter Bett
- Purpose: Encourage the study of the history of medicine in memory of Sir William Osler.
- Location: Royal College of Physicians
- 1st President: Sir Zachary Cope
- Present President: Mike Collins
- Affiliations: British Society for the History of Medicine
- Website: osler.org.uk

The Osler Club of London, founded in 1928, is a medical society with the purpose of encouraging the study of history of medicine, particularly amongst medical students, and to keep "green the memory of Sir William Osler". Membership in the club is open to medical professionals, medical students, persons associated with the history of medicine and in allied sciences.

== Origins ==
The Club was founded by a group of British men, considered part of a medical elite and pursuing the same ideals. They were following the "Oslerian legacy" which was reflected in their activities. Osler was the "ideal British gentleman" who showed concern, commitment, and loyalty to both patients and colleagues. His interests in books and the history of medicine were emphasised, particularly in the first 10 years of the Club.

The most influential Club founder was probably Alfred White Franklin. In 1926, whilst a medical student, Franklin had crossed the Atlantic with the Cambridge University Medical Society. His experiences of the hospitality he and his colleagues met with at various American and Canadian cities was reflected in his notes, describing the importance of maintaining contact, "sympathy and cooperation between the English-speaking peoples that is so essential for international peace". A selection of men, from places connected with Sir William, had "met the spirit of Osler". By 1927, Franklin and his friend Walter Reginald Bett had visited Sir William's literary executor and nephew, W.W. Francis, at Sir William's house in Oxford, been seduced by "Oslerolatry", and in response, drawn up a plan to form the "Osler Club". T. F. McNair Scott, G. W. Pickering, H. E. Mansell, and C.F. Watts also became founding members. The Osler Club of London was among the first organisations to be founded in Osler's name.

The first meeting of the Club was held on 30 April 1928 around the drawing room fireplace in Franklin's father's house at 27 Wimpole Street, London. In attendance were Charles Singer, the conservator of the Wellcome Historical Medical Museum, L. W. G. Malcolm, and six medical students. They listened to a paper on the "Life and Work of Louis Pasteur".

The Club was one of the four original affiliated members of the British Society for the History of Medicine. Its first president was Sir Zachary Cope.

Between 1928 and 1938, a total of 71 meetings were held, with an initial average attendance of 17 people. However, in the years before the Second World War, only a few meetings were held and none took place during the war.

== Thomas Cotton room ==
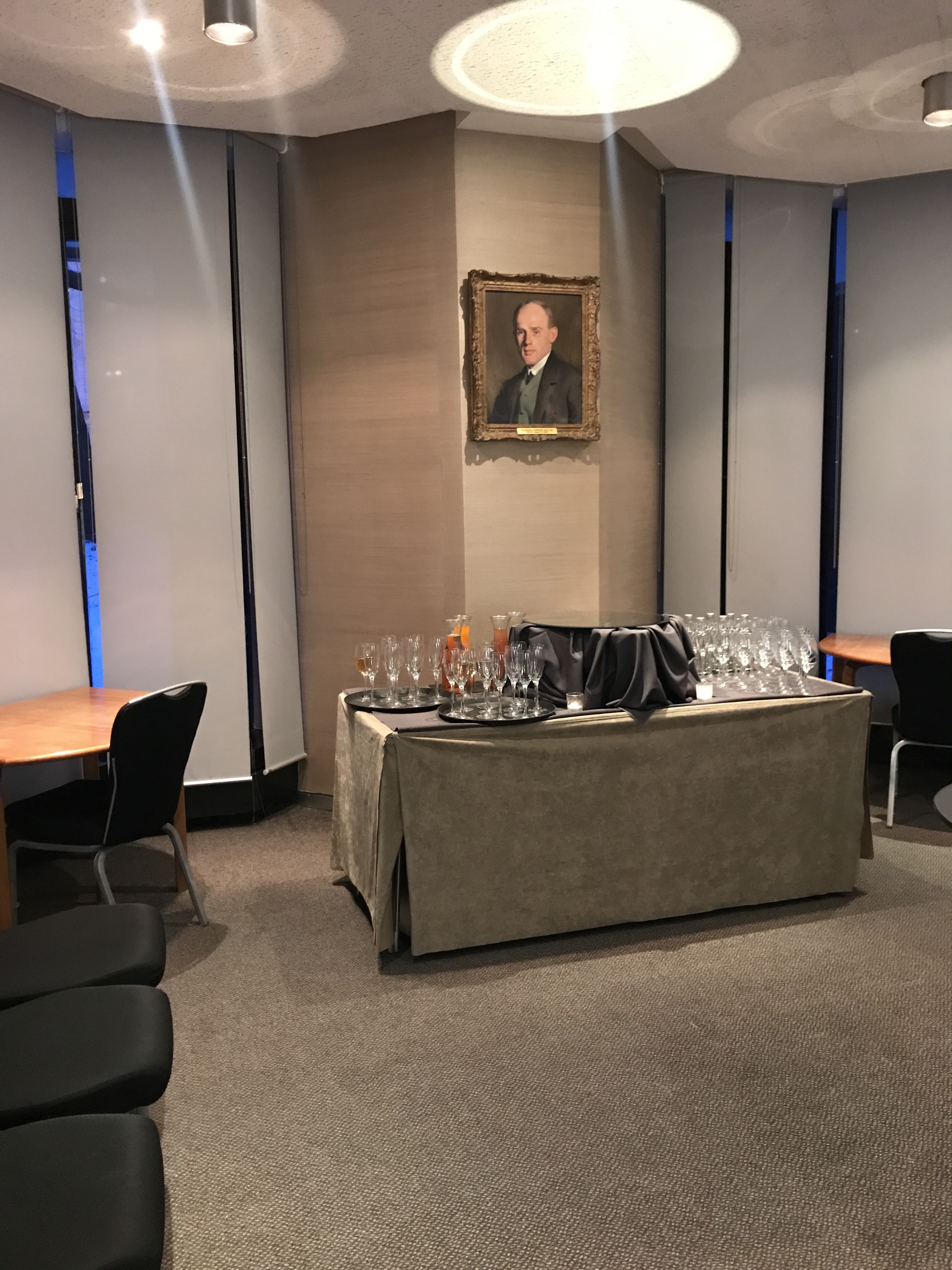
Thomas Cotton room

Without a firm base, the Club met at various venues in addition to the Franklin home, including the Medical Society of London, Wellcome Institute, the Royal College of Surgeons, and the Royal College of Physicians (RCP). In 1949, the annual dinner was held at the Royal College of Surgeons. In 1957, the Club met at the Medical Society of London.

A substantial bequest from the estate of cardiologist Thomas Forrest Cotton enabled the Club to secure a permanent home when the RCP's dining room was named the Osler Room, and the Thomas Cotton Room was established to store the library, archives, and other possessions of the Club. Along with this, the RCP permitted use of their premises for Club events.

== Activities ==
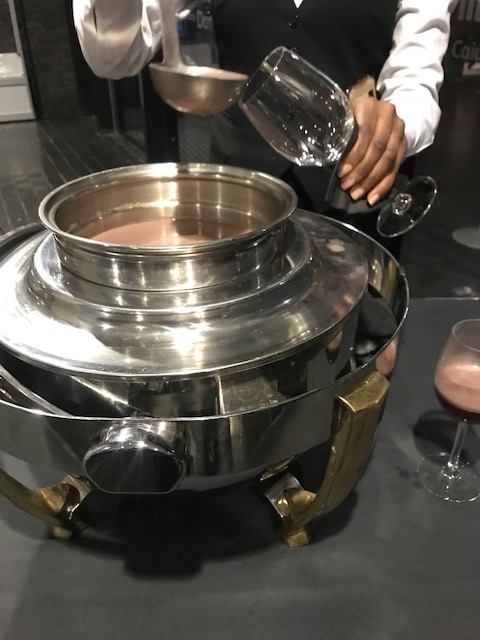
Osler Club of London, Punch

The Club meets on average once every two months, when a members' paper is presented, consisting of original research on the history of medicine and associated subjects. Reflecting Osler's humanistic approach, topics are not solely confined to the history of medicine, and past contributions have touched on ethics, law, and modern changes affecting society and medicine. At the annual general meeting in 1970, Norah Schuster presented a talk on "That Picture", a portrait of Alexander, Emperor of the Russias, painted by James Northcote in 1820. On 4 November 2010 a lecture on the history of Guy’s, King’s and St. Thomas' hospitals.

Meetings are carried out under Chatham House Rule whereby members are free to use anything heard at the meeting but are not allowed to reveal its source.

== Worldwide ==
There are Osler clubs in the United States, Canada, Japan, Argentina, and elsewhere around the world.

== Notable members ==
- Zachary Cope
- W. S. C. Copeman
- George W. Pickering
- D'Arcy Power
- Humphry Rolleston
- Shigeaki Hinohara
- Daniel Sokol

== See also ==
- List of presidents of the Osler Club of London
- American Osler Society
