= Journal of the History of Medicine and Allied Sciences =

Academic journal

- Discipline: History of medicine
- Language: English
- Edited by: Laura Hirshbein

Publication details
- History: 1946-present
- Publisher: Oxford University Press
- Frequency: Quarterly
- Open access: Hybrid
- Impact factor: 0.4 (2025)

Standard abbreviations
- ISO 4: J. Hist. Med. Allied Sci.

Indexing
- CODEN: JHMAA6
- ISSN: 0022-5045 (print); 1468-4373 (web)
- LCCN: 47-2799
- OCLC no.: 01800317

Links
- Journal homepage; Online access; Online archive

The Journal of the History of Medicine and Allied Sciences is a quarterly peer-reviewed academic journal that was originally published by the Department of the History of Medicine at Yale University and now is continued by Oxford University Press. It covers research on the history of medicine and was established in 1946. The editor-in-chief is Laura Hirshbein (University of Michigan).According to the Journal Citation Reports, the journal has a 2025 impact factor of 0.4.

== Abstracting and indexing ==
The journal is abstracted and indexed in:

- Science Citation Index Expanded
- Social Sciences Citation Index
- Arts & Humanities Citation Index
- Current Contents Clinical Medicine
- Essential Science Indicators
- Index Medicus/MEDLINE/PubMed
- Scopus
