= Faculty of the History and Philosophy of Medicine and Pharmacy =

Education institute, part of Society of Apothecaries in London

The Faculty of the History & Philosophy of Medicine & Pharmacy
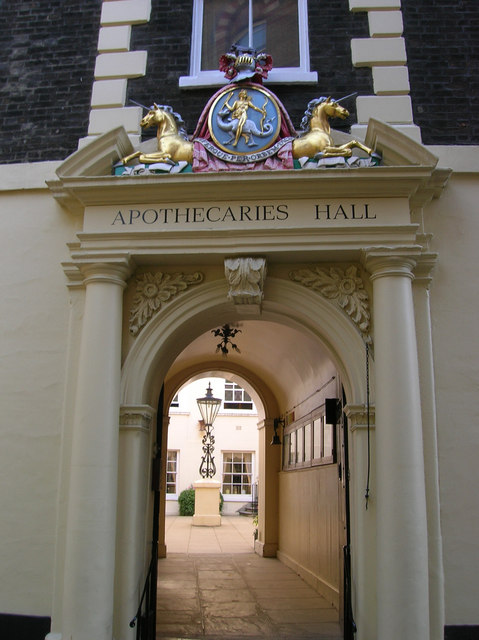
- Location: Apothecaries' Hall; Black Friars Lane, London
- Date of formation: 1959
- Company association: Medicine and Pharmacy
- Website: Faculty of History & Philosophy of Medicine & Pharmacy

The Faculty of History and Philosophy of Medicine and Pharmacy was set up in 1959. It operates under the Society of Apothecaries, but as its own separate organisation, with its own registered charity status.

== Education ==
The main focus of the Faculty is the provision of education through its year-long postgraduate diploma. Diplomas obtainable include the DHMSA (diploma in the history of medicine) and the DPMSA (diploma in the philosophy of medicine).

== Events and Lectures ==
The Faculty of the History and Philosophy of Medicine and Pharmacy hosts several lectures throughout the year. Their lectures series are called "eponymous lectures, and each are named after a significant person to the Apothecaries: Monckton Copeman Lecture, John Locke Lecture, Osler Lecture, Sydenham Lecture, and Gideon de Laune Lecture.
