= Wellcome Institute for the History of Medicine =

- Active: 1968–1999
- Parent institution: Wellcome Trust
- Address: Wellcome Building, 183 Euston Road, London NW1 2BE, London, United Kingdom
- Website: http://www.wellcome.ac.uk/

The Wellcome Institute for the History of Medicine (1968–1999) was a London centre for the study and teaching of medical history. It consisted of the Wellcome Library and an Academic Unit. The former was and is a world-class library collection owned and managed by the Wellcome Trust and staffed by librarians including academic librarians who held honorary lectureships at University College London. The Academic Unit was a group of university staff appointed at University College London that conducted a programme of university teaching, thesis supervision, seminars, conferences and publications.

== Directors of the Wellcome Historical Medical Museum and of the Wellcome Institute for the History of Medicine ==
- 1913–1936 Henry S. Wellcome, LLD, DSc, FRS (Founder and Director)
- 1913–1925 C. J. S. Thompson, MBE (Curator)
- 1925–1934 L. W. G. Malcolm, MSc, PhD, FRSE (Conservator)
- 1934–1947 Captain Peter J. Johnston-Saint, MA, FRSE (Conservator) (photo)
- 1941–1945 Dr S. H. Daukes, OBE, MD
- 1946–1964 Edgar Ashworth Underwood, MD, FRCP
- 1964–1973 F. Noël L. Poynter, BA, PhD, Hon MD, FLA
- 1973–1979 Edwin Sisterton Clarke, MD, FRCP
- 1980–1981 Prof. Alfred Rupert Hall, MA, LittD, FBA (chairman)
- 1981–1983 Peter O. Williams, MB, FRCP
- 1983–1987 Prof. Sir William Paton, CBE, DM, FRCP, FRS

== Librarians ==
- 1900–1913 C. J. S. Thompson
- 1913–1918 T. W. Huck, FLA
- 1919–1921 C. C. Barnard, MLA
- 1921–1925 W. R. B. Prideaux, BA, FLA (photo)
- 1925–1931 C. R. Hewitt, FLA
- 1932–1946 S. A. J. Moorat, MA, DipLib (obit)
- 1946–1953 W. J. Bishop, FLA
- 1954–1964 F. Noël L. Poynter, BA, PhD, Hon MD, FLA
- 1964–1973 E. Gaskell, BA, ALA
- 1973–1996 Eric J. Freeman, BA, ALA
- 1996–2004 David Pearson

In 1999 the Wellcome Institute for the History of Medicine was terminated, and in its place two new organisations were created: The Wellcome Library and the Wellcome Trust Centre for the History of Medicine at UCL. Prof. Harold Cook was appointed Director of the Wellcome Centre at UCL from 2000 to 2009, while the following persons succeeded David Pearson as Librarians of the Wellcome Library.

- 2004–2009 Frances Norton
- 2010–2014 Simon Chaplin
- 2015– Robert Kiley (acting)

== Academic Unit in 1992 ==
- William Bynum MA MD PhD MRCP (Head) Allen MA PhD (Life Sciences)
- Janet Browne MA PhD (Life Sciences)
- Lawrence I. Conrad PhD (Islamic Medicine)
- Christopher Lawrence MB ChB PhD (Clinical Medicine)
- Michael Neve MA PhD (Human Biology)
- Vivian Nutton MA PhD (Classical Medicine)
- Roy Porter MA PhD (Social History of Medicine)
- Elizabeth (Tilli) Tansey BSc PhD (Modern Medical Science)
- Andrew Wear BA MSc PhD (Early Modern Medicine)

== See also ==
- History of Modern Biomedicine Research Group
