= Kenneth David Keele =

English physician

Kenneth David Keele FRCP (23 March 1909 - 3 May 1987) was an English physician and president of the History of Medicine Society of the Royal Society of Medicine from 1960 to 1962.
