= Charles Edward Newman =

British physician and medical school dean

- Born: 16 March 1900; 42 Gower Street, London, England
- Died: 22 August 1989 (aged 89); Brent, London, England, UK
- Occupations: physician and medical school dean

Charles Edward Kingsley Newman CBE FRCP (16 March 1900 – 22 August 1989) was a British physician and medical school dean.

== Biography ==
After education at Mill Mead School in Shrewsbury and then at Shrewsbury School, Newman spent the summer of 1918 in the Oxford University Officers' Training Corps. In 1919 he was demobilised and matriculated at Magdalene College, Cambridge, where he graduated BA (Cantab.) in 1921. He studied medicine at King's College Hospital Medical School, where he qualified MRCS, LRCP in 1923 and graduated MB BCh in 1924. In 1926 he won the RCP's Murchison Scholarship and qualified MRCP. He graduated MD in 1927. He held various house appointments at the Belgrave Hospital for Children and at King's College Hospital, where he was for two years a Sambrooke medical registrar. He spent six months at the University of Freiburg as a volunteer assistant to Ludwig Aschoff. At King's College Hospital, Newman was appointed junior physician, morbid anatomist, medical tutor, and vice-dean. There he was promoted to full physician in 1938 and offered the deanship of the King's College Hospital Medical School, but he resigned to become a sub-dean at Hammersmith's Royal Postgraduate Medical School.

At the outbreak of the second world war he took charge of the children's wards in the hospital, ran the Home Guard, and gradually took over the work of the School until the retirement of the dean, Colonel Proctor, in 1946. With his secretary, Connie O’Driscoll, Newman—now dean—reorganized the administration of the School, obtained hutted accommodation for new laboratories and enrolled postgraduate students in numbers never envisaged before. ... he retired in 1965.

When Sir Charles Dodds became president of the Royal College of Physicians in 1962, Newman succeeded him as Harveian Librarian, holding that office for seventeen years. He was awarded the RCP's Linacre Fellowship in 1966.

His most notable contribution to medical history generally was his Evolution of medical education in the nineteenth century (1957), 'the standard history of the emergence of the modern teaching hospital' according to Roy Porter, based on his 1954–5 Fitzpatrick lectures to the College. ... The series of papers on the history of the College Library, written partly with the Librarian, Leonard Payne, and published in the RCP's Journal, was a product mainly of his research and enthusiasm and covered the foundation of the College to the end of the nineteenth century.

Newman married his first wife in 1952, who died in 1965. In 1971 he married his second wife, who died in 1982. Upon his death in 1989 he was survived by several stepchildren from his second marriage.

== Awards and honours ==
- 1932 — FRCP
- 1933 — Goulstonian Lecturer
- 1954–1955 — Fitzpatrick Lecturer
- 1965 – CBE
- 1968 – Fitzpatrick Lecturer
- 1973 — Harveian Orator

== Selected publications ==
- "Royal College of Physicians of London: 450 years". Br Med J. 4 (5623): 108–111. 12 October 1968. doi:10.1136/bmj.4.5623.108. PMC 1912096. PMID 4880257.
- with L. M. Payne: "The History of the College Library 1688—1727". J R Coll Physicians Lond. 5 (4): 385–396. July 1971. PMC 5366596. PMID 4940087.
- "The College Goes West". J R Coll Physicians Lond. 7 (2): 111–121. January 1973. PMC 5368785. PMID 4570917.
- with L. M. Payne: "Dr Munk, Harveian librarian: the first period". J R Coll Physicians Lond. 11 (3): 281–288. April 1977. PMC 5368721. PMID 323476.
- "New Light on the Museum Harveianum". J R Coll Physicians Lond. 12 (3): 262–271. April 1978. PMC 5366700. PMID 347061.
- "Research in a Library". J R Coll Physicians Lond. 18 (1): 74. January 1984. PMC 5370955. PMID 30667803.
