= Haldane Philp Tait =

Scottish medical officer

- Born: 1911
- Died: 1990
- Occupation(s): Principal Medical Officer for the Child Health Service, Edinburgh
- Known for: Preventable diseases in children; Writing the SSHM's annual proceedings; Historico-medical writings
- Medical career
- Sub-specialties: Child welfare; Training of medical and nursing staff
- Notable works: Dr Elsie Maud Inglis (1864-1917): a great lady doctor; A Doctor and Two Policemen

Haldane Philp Tait (1911–1990) was the Principal Medical Officer for the Child Health Service, Edinburgh and co-founder of the Scottish Society of the History of Medicine and as a result of his contributions, became its President in 1977 and Honorary President in 1981. He also published Dr Elsie Maud Inglis (1864-1917): a great lady doctor in 1964, and later recorded the history of the Edinburgh Health Department from 1862 to 1974 in a book entitled A Doctor and Two Policemen.

== Early life and education ==
Haldane Tait was born and educated in Edinburgh. He graduated MBChB in 1933. His essay on “The early history of paediatrics in Britain” was awarded the Wellcome Medal and Prize in the History of Medicine (University of Edinburgh, 1950).

== Career ==
He subsequently pursued a career in preventive healthcare in relation to child health as Principal Medical Officer for the Child Health Service, Edinburgh. He was particularly interested in the training of medical and nursing staff and in 1966–67, on behalf of the World Health Organization, he spent a year as Visiting Lecturer at the University of Baroda in India.

He was a founder member of the Scottish Society of the History of Medicine (SSHM) and was appointed its first secretary in 1948, solely running its affairs for the subsequent 15 years and as Joint Secretary for many years thereafter. He was President of the SSHM, from 1977–1979 and was made Honorary President in 1981 in recognition of his contributions to the Society's affairs.

He wrote the SSHM's annual proceedings, which he expanded from an initial eight page report in 1953 to a 56-page one by 1970.

In 1953 he was elected a member of the Harveian Society of Edinburgh.

== Publications ==
Tait was a prolific writer. In 1964, he published Dr Elsie Maud Inglis (1864-1917): a great lady doctor (Edinburgh: Bridgend Press) and in 1974, he published A Doctor and Two Policemen (Edinburgh: Mackenzie and Storrie Ltd), which detailed the history of the Edinburgh Health Department from its creation in 1862 to its dissolution in 1974. He also wrote many articles and a collection of his papers, correspondence and scrapbooks are kept with the Lothian Health Service Archive at the University of Edinburgh Library.

Edinburgh cartoonist Harry Gilzean drew Tait for his retirement in 1976.

== Death and legacy ==
Tait was passed Douglas Guthrie's scrapbook on the reviews of the critically acclaimed A History of Medicine, which was donated to the Lothian Health Service Archive after Tait's death.

The SSHM holds an annual dinner in his memory at which an invited speaker gives a pre-dinner speech. Past speakers have included Magnus Magnusson and Professor Tom Devine.
