= William Copeman =

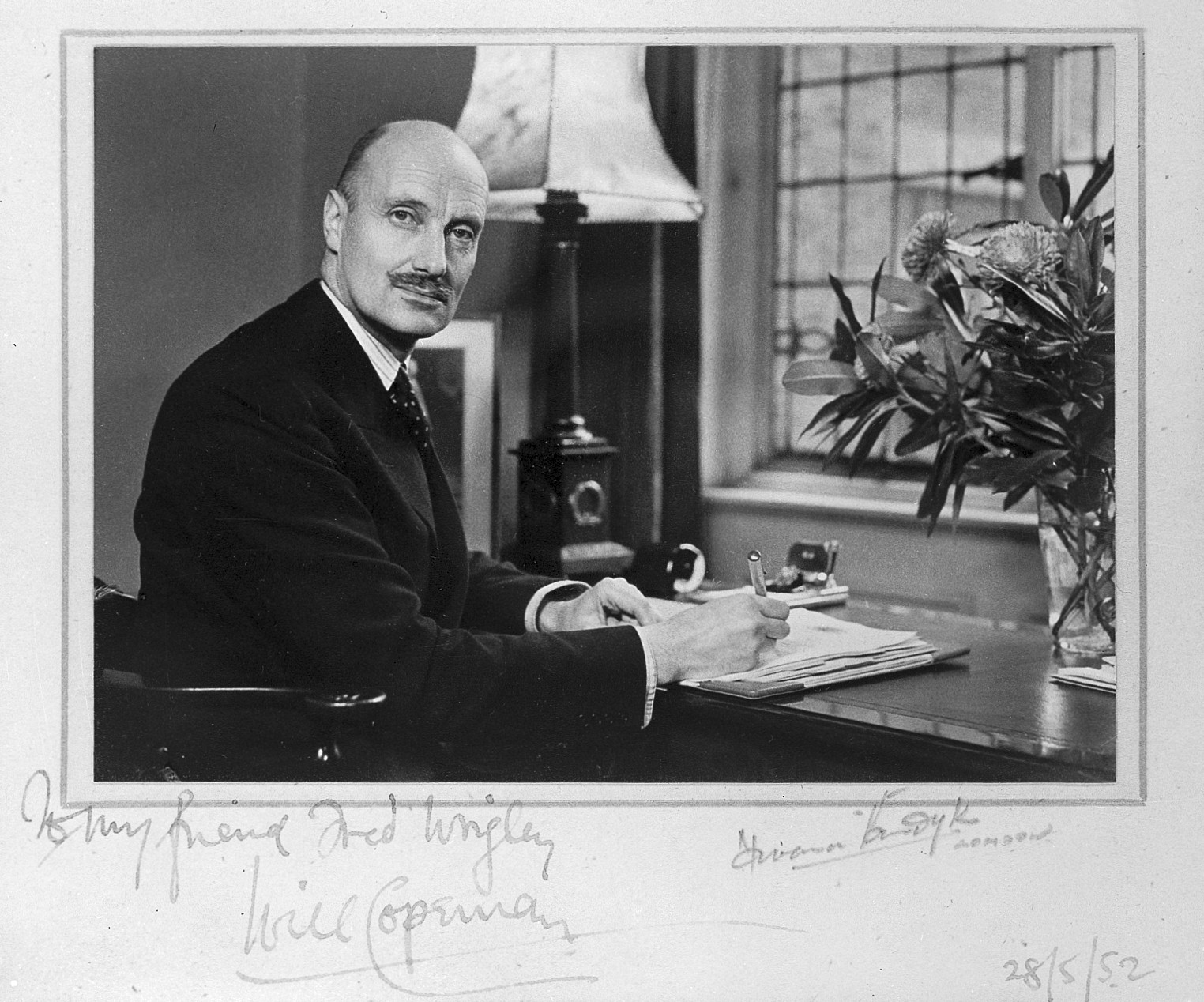
Portrait of William Copeman Wellcome

William Sidney Charles Copeman CBE TD FRCP (1900 – 24 November 1970) was a British rheumatologist and a medical historian, best remembered for his contributions to the study of arthritic disease.

As a rheumatologist, Copeman was influential in the running of the Heberden Society, the foundation and editorship of the Annals of the Rheumatic Diseases, and the first editor of the Textbook of the Rheumatic Diseases which was first published in 1948. He worked at the Arthur Stanley Institute for Rheumatic Diseases at Middlesex Hospital, as well as being the consultant rheumatologist for the British Army and the Royal Star and Garter Home, Richmond. In 1936, he set up the Empire Rheumatism Council, now known as Arthritis UK.

As a medical historian, Copeman gave the Fitzpatrick Lectures at the Royal College of Physicians, which formed the content for his 1960 book Doctors and Diseases in Tudor Times. He also published a book on the History of Gout and Rheumatic Diseases which stemmed from lectures given at the University of California at Los Angeles. He was also elected a fellow of the International Academy of the History of Medicine. He was president of the History of Medicine Society at The Royal Society of Medicine, London between 1964 and 1966. During this time, he represented the Worshipful Society of Apothecaries when founding the British Society for the History of Medicine in 1965.

He was the son of Dr Sydney Copeman, also a well-known physician. During World War I, he served as an officer with the Coldstream Guards.

His son was the dermatologist Peter Copeman, also known as Dr Spot.

== Selected publications ==
- A Short History of the Gout and the Rheumatic Diseases (1964)
