= List of presidents of the British Society for the History of Medicine =

The presidents of the British Society for the History of Medicine have been:

== 1965-1975 ==
No.	Years	Name	Comments	Image
1	1965–1967	Douglas Guthrie	In 1956, Guthrie was elected President of the History of Medicine Section of the Royal Society of Medicine (RSM) after already having been the President of the Scottish Society of the History of Medicine. In 1957, he stated in his presidential address at the RSM "…it is obvious that history supplies an essential basis of medicine. It gives us ideals to follow, inspirations for our work and hope for the future". In 1965 he was involved in the founding of the British Society for the History of Medicine and was elected its first President.	
	1967	Lord Cohen of Birkenhead		Lord Henry Cohen of Birkenhead
	1972	Noël Poynter (1908–1979)	Librarian then Director of the Wellcome Institute for the History of Medicine.	Noël Poynter

== 1975-1985 ==
No.	Years	Name	Comments	Image
		Arthur Rook	A leading British dermatologist and the principal author of Rook's Textbook of Dermatology (1968).	
	1984/85	Sir Gordon Wolstenholme		

== 1985-1995 ==
No.	Years	Name	Comments	Image
	1986	John Cule	Cule was a Welsh physician who worked as a general practitioner and later as a psychiatrist. In 2005, he was awarded a MBE for his work in mental health in West Wales. He was nominated an honorary member of the SSHM at the 38th congress held in 1986 at Edinburgh.	
		John Kirkup		
	1991	Alastair Hugh Bailey Masson (1925–2009)	Consultant anaesthetist who authored a number of papers on anaesthesia and medical history.	
	1993	John Blair	Scottish consultant Surgeon and medical historian, who authored a number of books.	John Blair 2018
	1994	David Gardner-Medwin		

== 1995-2005 ==
No.	Years	Name	Comments	Image
	2000	Denis Dunbar Gibbs	Gibbs was a physician in general medicine and gastroenterology at the London Hospital.	
	1999	John M. T. Ford		
	2003	Aileen Adams	Adams is a retired consultant anaesthetist. She worked at Addenbrooke's Hospital, Cambridge, with a focus on ophthalmic and neuroanaesthesia. In 1985, she was Dean of the Faculty of Anaesthetists of the Royal College of Surgeons of England. In 1993, she was Hunterian professor in the Royal College of Surgeons and has been a president of the History of Anaesthesia Society. She has also been president of the section of anaesthetics and section of the history of medicine, both at the Royal Society of Medicine.	
	2005	John W. K. Ward		John Ward (physician), Osler Club of London 2019

== 2005-2015 ==
No.	Years	Name	Comments	Image
	2007	David Wright	Wright is a retired consultant anaesthetist who was also elected the president of the Scottish Society of the History of Medicine in 2001 and has been editor of the International Society for the History of Medicine's journal Vesalius.	David Wright, anaesthetist, past president of the Scottish Society of the History of Medicine
	2009	Sue Weir		
	2011	Adrian Thomas	Thomas is a retired radiologist who became interested in the history of radiology when he was a registrar at Hammersmith Hospital. He has been a visiting professor at Canterbury Christ Church University, president of the Radiology Section of the Royal Society of Medicine and honorary historian to the British Institute of Radiology.	Adrian Thomas (radiologist)
	2013	Peter Homan		

== 2015-2026 ==
No.	Years	Name	Comments	Image
	2015	Iain Macintyre	Surgeon to the Queen in Scotland until his retirement in 2004, Macintyre graduated in medicine from Edinburgh University and stayed in Edinburgh throughout his surgical career. During the 500th anniversary celebration of the Royal College of Surgeons of Edinburgh, he was its vice president.	
	2017	Chris Derrett	A Durham University graduate in applied physics, Derrett worked at the Medical Research Council (MRC) Air Pollution Research Unit. He later gained a degree in medicine from the Royal Free School of Medicine and became a general practitioner (GP), GP trainer, appraiser, senior clinical lecturer at Bart's and the London School of Medicine and Head of GP Development for City and Hackney Primary Care Trust.	
	2019	Mike Collins	A graduate of Galway University, Collins worked as a consultant radiologist in Sheffield until his retirement. His history of medicine interests include the early use of X-Rays, the First World War, Sir William Wilde and lead poisoning.	
	2021	Mike Davidson		
	2023	Edward Wawrzynczak		
	2025	Hilary Morris		

== See also ==
- British Society for the History of Medicine
- List of presidents of the Scottish Society of the History of Medicine
- Poynter Lecture
