= List of presidents of the Scottish Society of the History of Medicine =

This is a list of presidents of the Scottish Society of the History of Medicine (SSHM).

== 1948–1960 ==
Table featuring presidents of the Scottish Society of the History of Medicine
Year	Name	Comments	Image
1948	Douglas Guthrie (1885–1975)	Otolaryngologist and historian of medicine whose book, A History of Medicine published in 1945, came to international attention. In 1948 Guthrie brought about the foundation of the SSHM and served as its first president. Subsequently, he became president of the British Society for the History of Medicine and the History of Medicine Society at the Royal Society of Medicine.	
1951	John Ritchie (1882–1959)	Friend of Guthrie, he co-founded the SSHM and contributed to the journal Medical History, which the society co-established in 1957.	
1954	Archibald Goodall (1915–1963)	Surgeon and honorary librarian at the University of Glasgow, and co-founder of the SSHM. He was the first member from Glasgow.	
1957	William Smith Mitchell (d. 1982)	Mitchell became librarian at King's College, Newcastle upon Tyne, and then at the University of Newcastle upon Tyne. In 1955, he authored a History of Scottish Bookbinding, 1432–1650.	
1960	Adam Patrick (1883–1970)	Patrick was lecturer on the history of medicine at St. Andrews University in 1950.	

== 1963–1980 ==
Table featuring presidents of the Scottish Society of the History of Medicine
Year	Name	Comments	Image
1963	Charles Henry Kemball (1889–1964)		
1964	William Alister Alexander (1890–1976)		
1966	Norman McOmish Dott, CBE (1897–1973)	The first holder of the Chair of Neurological Surgery at the University of Edinburgh.	
1968	Meredith Davison (1911–1970)		
1971	Thomas Robert Rushton Todd (1895–1975)		
1974	Charles Gray Drummond (d 1985)		
1977	Haldane Philp Tait (1911–1990)	Tait was the Principal Medical Officer for the Child Health Service, Edinburgh and co-founder of the Scottish Society of the History of Medicine, and as a result of his contributions became its president in 1977 and Honorary President in 1981.	
1979	Sir Charles Illingworth, CBE (1900–1990)		

== 1981-2000 ==
Table featuring presidents of the Scottish Society of the History of Medicine
Year	Name	Comments	Image
1981	William Cunningham (1903–1998)		
1984	Alastair Hugh Bailey Masson (1925–2009)		
1987	David A. G. Waddell (1927–1992)		
1990	John Blair (1928– 2023)	Scottish consultant surgeon and medical historian, who authored a number of books.	John Blair 2018
1993	Elizabeth Margaret Rose (1916–2011)		
1995	Harold Thomas Swan (1922–2011)		
1998	John McColl Forrester (1923–2017)		

== 2000-2026 ==
Table featuring presidents of the Scottish Society of the History of Medicine
Year	Name	Comments	Image
2001	David John Wright (1944–)	Wright is a retired consultant anaesthetist who was also the president of the British Society for the History of Medicine from 2007 to 2009. He has been editor of the International Society for the History of Medicine's journal Vesalius.	David Wright, anaesthetist, past president of the Scottish Society of the History of Medicine
2004	Bryan Ashworth (1929–2012)		
2007	Roy Miller (1935–)		
2010	David Hugh Aird Boyd (1927–)		
2013	Antony Robert Butler		
2017	Niall Diarmid Campbell Finlayson	Finlayson was appointed consultant physician and gastroenterologist at Edinburgh Royal Infirmary in 1973. His special interest is in liver disease and he made particular contributions to the Infirmary's 'Liver Transplant Unit'.	
2019	Neil MacGillivray		Professor Neil MacGillivray
2022	Andreas Demetriades		
2024	Malcolm Kinnear	Consultant psychiatrist in NHS Fife & honorary lecturer at University of Dundee.	

== See also ==
- List of presidents of the British Society for the History of Medicine
