= Stymie (disambiguation) =

Stymie is an obsolete greens situation once governed by rule in golf.

Stymie or Stymies may also refer to:

- Stymies, men's second team at Cambridge University Golf Club founded in 1869
- Stymie Beard (1925–1981), American child actor in Our Gang
- Stymie (horse) (1941–1962), American Thoroughbred racehorse
