= Royal Malta Golf Club =

Golf club in Marsa, Malta

Coordinates: 35°52′30″N 14°29′15″E

The Royal Malta Golf Club is located on Aldo Moro Street, Marsa, Malta.

== History ==
Royal Malta Golf Club was founded in 1888 by Lieutenant-General Sir Henry D'Oyley Torrens KCB KCMG. A career soldier, Sir Henry was commissioned as second lieutenant in the 23rd Foot, Royal Welsh Fusiliers in 1849. His rise through the ranks was very rapid, reaching the rank of colonel in 1864, major general in 1869 and finally lieutenant-general in 1884, when he was appointed to command British troops in South Africa. He was only 52 when he arrived in Cape Town, his exceptional ability reflected in the high rank he held at a comparatively early age. Within ten days of his arrival he had launched the game of golf in South Africa. Thus the Cape Golf Club (the forerunner of Royal Cape) came into being.

Sir Henry's final posting was as governor and commander-in-chief of Malta. He arrived in Malta on 28 September 1888 and within one month he had founded Royal Malta, with a clubhouse in St Anne's Ditch and a 9-hole course laid out around the bastions (better known as the Hornworks) of Valletta. It was not much of a golf course, with practically no turf and with "greens" of pozzolana concrete, covered with sand to give the ball some stop. The so-called fairways were no more than 20 yards (18 m) wide with stone walls, in some cases 150 feet (46 m) high, on both sides. The ball could ricochet from one side to another or become lodged in the battlements. At least this form of golf satisfied the voracious appetite for golf of the servicemen stationed on the island. Some photographs of this unique course still survive and are on the wall of the club house. Golf was also apparently played at the Mosta garrisons but no records of this "course" exist.

At the time the then Duke of Edinburgh, Prince Albert Ernest Alfred, third son of Queen Victoria, also served in Malta and became one of the founder members of the club, hence the royal patronage from where the club gets its name. The circle of golf clubs in the Commonwealth with Royal status is an exclusive one, with just 61 members. The relationship between golf and the British monarchy started in 1833 when King William IV bestowed the appellation upon Scotland’s Royal Perth Golfing Society. The king was also a patron of The Royal and Ancient Golf Club of St Andrews, which he crowned one year later. Since then clubs in 12 countries have been honoured.

The club moved to its present location in 1904. With limited land available it only had 14 holes and the area had to be shared with tennis players and cricketers. The course was extended to 18 holes in the 1950s but a horse-racing track crossed seven of the holes and the horses obviously had priority. The track was annexed to the golf course in the late 1980s and the course is now fully self-contained. The designer of the course is not known.

The first known professional to be associated with the Malta course was F. Dalton, who was appointed in 1909, but the length of his stay is not known; it seems that none of the several appointees stayed for long.

The most renowned pro was David Llewellyn, who was there between 1978 and 1981; he was a confirmed "islander", for he had first learned his golf in Singapore, then on Hayling Island, before becoming a professional. He was Sir Henry Cotton Rookie of the Year in 1971 and his greatest feat after leaving Malta was to win, with Ian Woosnam, the World title for Wales in 1987.

After one hundred years of existence the club decided to upgrade the overall standard of the course. The investment was considered huge and the project was based on a duration of 4–5 years. The first part of the project started in early 1988 when the club brought in consultants from the United Kingdom to redo the 18 greens. There was a six-month suspension of this project when 70% of the golf course was completely destroyed after heavy floods in late 1988, which also caused a disruption to the festivities commemorating the centenary of the club.

Despite this huge setback, works started again in May 1989 and have continued since. To date the course has been totally upgraded, with the fairways planted with Bermuda grass, the installation of a computerised wall-to-wall watering system, the refurbishment of the sand bunkers (some 50 in total) as designed by David Llewellyn and the re-planting of the tees with TifSport-certified Bermuda grass and the greens with state-of-the-art TifEagle-certified Bermuda grass.

== See also ==
- List of golf clubs granted Royal status
