= Duff House Royal Golf Club =

Golf club in Banff, Scotland, founded in 1910

- Duff House Royal logo

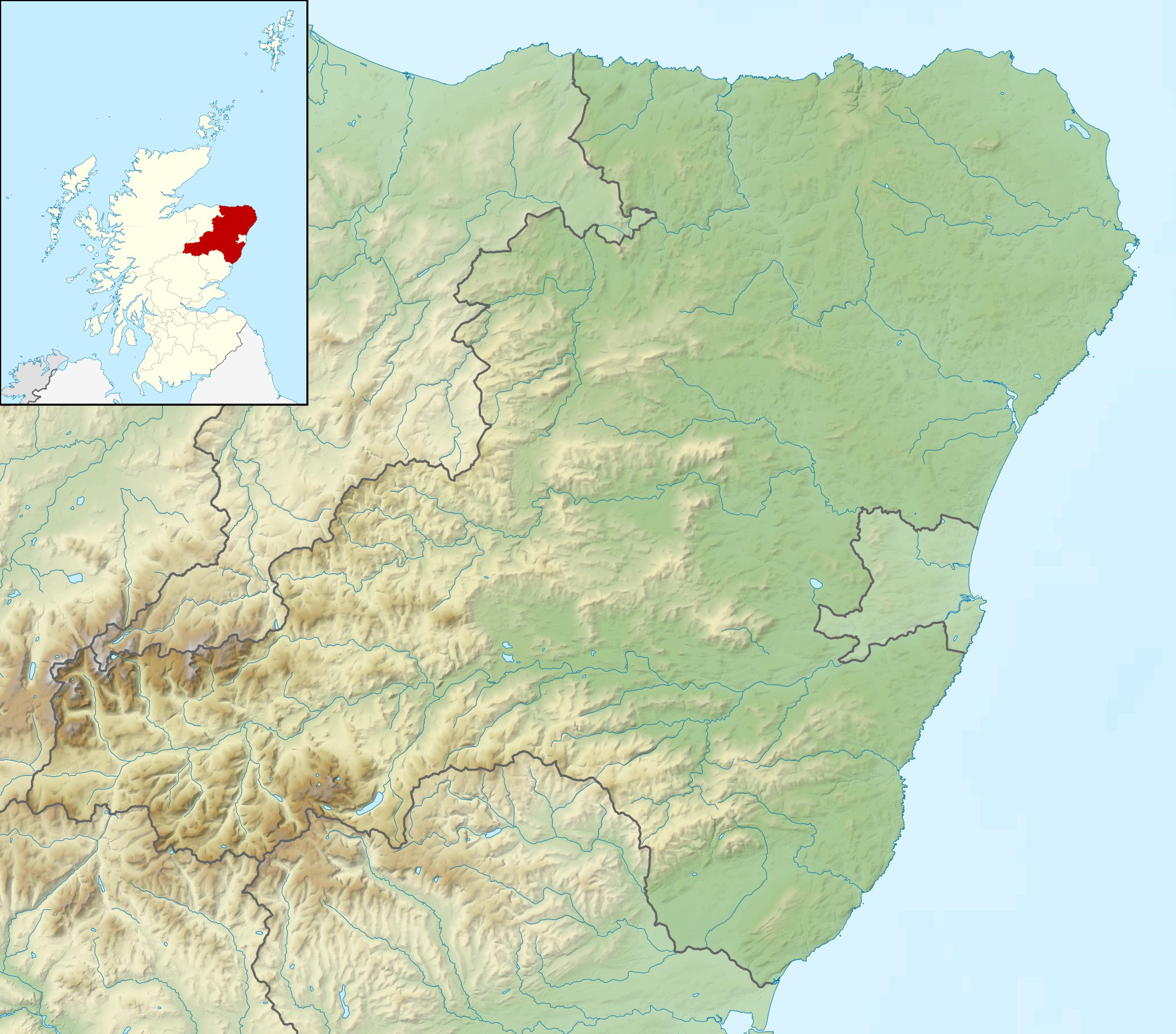
- Location in Scotland Location in Aberdeenshire, Scotland
- 57.6613°N 2.5223°W

Club information
- Location: Banff, Aberdeenshire, Scotland
- Established: 1910, 116 years ago
- Type: Private
- Total holes: 18
- Tournaments: Scottish Seniors Men's Open Championship, Gents 5 Day, Ladies 5 Day
- Website: www.duffhouseroyal.com

Course
- Designed by: Alister MacKenzie
- Par: 68
- Length: 6,043 yards (5,526 m)
- Course record: 60 (David Morrison - 2006)

Duff House Royal Golf Club is a Championship Course and one of the best parkland courses in Aberdeenshire and rated within the top 10 parklands in Scotland. Located in Banff, Scotland it was founded in 1910 and is designed by Dr Alister MacKenzie. It was founded as the Duff House Golf Club and became the Duff House Royal Golf Club after subsequently receiving royal patronage, at the request of Princess Louise, Dowager Duchess of Fife, in 1925.

There are 66 golf clubs around the world that have adopted the royal title from the British Royal Family. The first golf club to be conferred the title was the Royal Perth Golfing Society in 1833, followed by the Royal and Ancient Golf Club of St Andrews in 1834. Duff House Royal Golf Club – the only royal golf club where the royal title is used as a suffix and not a prefix. It is believed the reason for the royal title being a suffix to Duff House was a tribute to Louise, who was known as the Princess Royal, not the Royal Princess.

In 2014, the club featured in a book commissioned by the R&A to mark Her Majesty The Queen's Diamond Jubilee - Golf's Royal Clubs Honoured by The British Royal Family 1833-2013 by Scott Macpherson

== The Course ==
Duff House Royal Golf Club

The course has a scratch of 68. The course is flat and is close to the sea, it has little rough which makes the course a fair challenge to golfers. The course record is currently held by David Morrison (DHR) who completed the course in an 8-Under Par 60, whilst competing in August 2006.

Duff House Royal Golf Club was designed in 1923, by the legendary Dr. Alister MacKenzie, who also designed the world-famous 'Augusta National', home of The Masters. Duff House Royal still, till this day, have the large MacKenzie two-tiered greens.

The course is bounded by the River Deveron, which proves to be a hazard at a number of holes. The river flows into the sea through the seven-span Banff Bridge, which was completed in 1779 by John Smeaton, and forms the backdrop to the closing holes.

Nestling in the middle of the course is Duff House, considered one of the grandest classical country houses built in the 18th century and designed by William Adam It is managed by Historic Scotland and contains fine paintings and furniture on loan from the National Galleries of Scotland.

== Course details ==
Men Course Rating | White - 69.4/115 | Yellow - 68.7/113 | Red - 66.8/109 |

Duff House Royal Golf Club (White Tees - Men)
Hole	Name	Par	SSI	Yards	Hole	Name	Par	SSI	Yards
1	Doune	4	17	316	10	Lochlaverock	4	8	401
2	Barnyards	4	12	352	11	Orchard	3	13	205
3	Gaveny	4	3	396	12	Plateau	5	11	496
4	Alexandra	4	8	357	13	Duff	3	15	176
5	Corskie	4	6	371	14	Duncan Kennedy	4	7	425
6	Fife	3	18	133	15	Connaught	4	2	458
7	Island	4	1	453	16	Venus	3	9	237
8	Dane's Dyke	4	10	372	17	Bridge	4	4	455
9	Kirkside	3	14	173	18	Airlie	4	16	342
Out		34		2923		In		34	3195
							Out	34	2923
							Total	68	6118

== Course History ==
Although golf is supposed to have been played in Banff for 400 years, it was only in May 1871 that organised golf was conceived when the then Banff Golf Club was formed at the Banff links. The Banff Golf Club continued in existence with varying degrees of success until 1924.

The Duff House Golf Club came into existence following a gift of land to the towns of Banff and Macduff by the then Duke of Fife following his concern at "the want of ground for golf and other recreational sports." The original course in its present location was laid out in 1909.

Opened in 1909, the original course was designed by Archie Simpson (who laid out Royal Aberdeen's Balgownie) and it was formally opened when a match was played between two of the great golfing "triumvirate" – J.H. Taylor (the then Open Champion) and James Braid – with Taylor's score of 75 beating his opponent by three strokes.

In July, 1923 at the invitation of the executive of the Duff House Royal Golf Club, Dr MacKenzie, Golf course architect, Leeds, visited Banff and made a thorough examination and survey of the then 18-hole course in connection with the proposal to lay out a first class course. After his inspection Dr MacKenzie spoke favourably of the site. An inclusive figure of £2900 was muted to lay out a first class course.

The work was sanctioned and work would start in December, 1923 with a Government unemployment grant of £1200. Maj McKenzie, Leeds, the managing director of the British Golf Course Construction Coy would use horse-drawn scoops for bunkers and all eighteen greens where to be lifted, weeded and relayed on suitable foundations.

On 5 August 1924 the Mackenzie course was formally opened with a match between Sandy Herd of Moor Park and Ted Ray of Oxley, both returning scores of 71

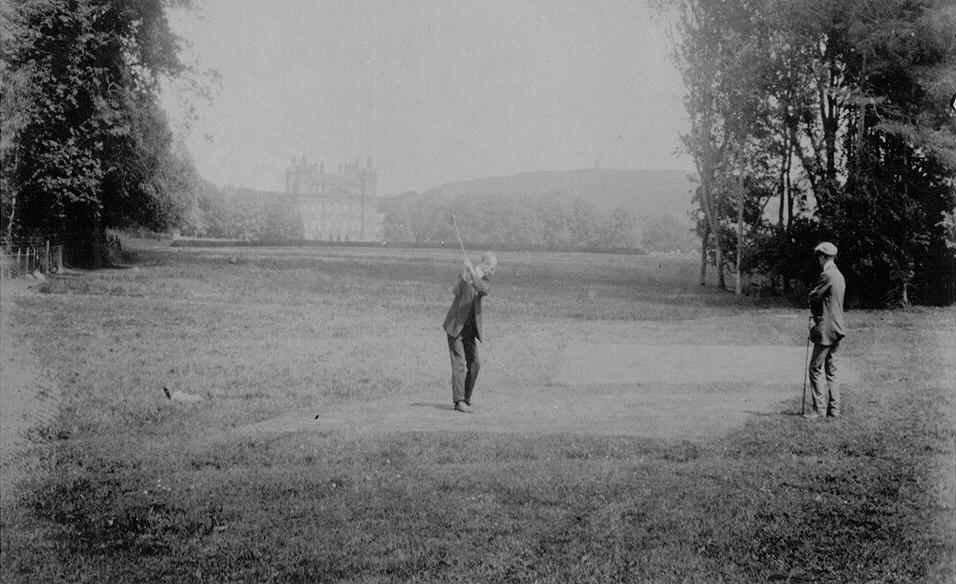
Duff House Royal course open for play 1924

On 1 January 1925, the two Banff golf clubs formally amalgamated as the Duff House Royal Golf Club. The union of the two Clubs survived, with tolerance and restraint being exercised on both sides, but it was only a matter of time before the axe would fall on the Links Course. The end came at the Annual General Meeting held on Thursday, 24 January 1929 when A.F. Spence, seconded by G.F. Goodall, formally moved that the maintenance of the Links Club be now discontinued. While expressing regret that such a motion should be necessary, Mr. Spence pointed out the annual financial loss to the club, the changed circumstances at the Links which "are now over-run in the summer by picnic parties and motor vehicles; also to the few members of the Club who play there and small support received from other players in the town and from visitors, also that this was an opportune time to give up the leased portion of the course in view of the cropping rotation of the Landlord's farm"

In 1949 the course was restored and re-opened following the "ploughing up" required during the Second World War and in 1962 an additional 35 acres were purchased at a cost of £3,000.

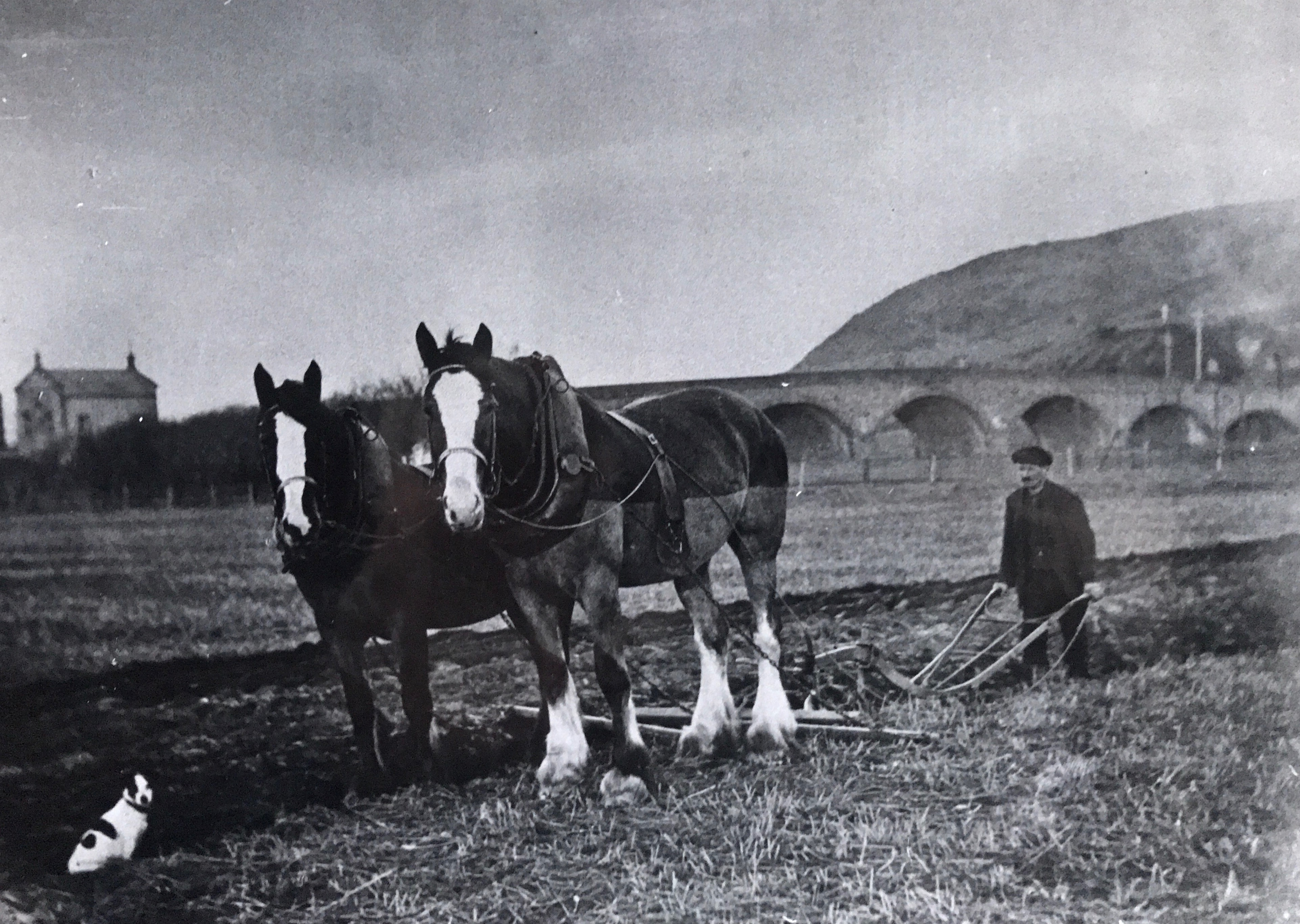
Ploughing up of golf course for crops needed during World War II

The original clubhouse was built in 1926 following a gift from Thomas Barton, and was known as the "Barton Pavilion" and remained largely unaltered until 1962. In that year it was reconstructed around the shell of the original Barton Pavilion and formally opened by Sir George W. Abercromby on 6 April 1963.

In 1966 a "Water to the Greens" scheme was completed and in 1997 a fully automated watering system for greens and tees was installed. In 1973 it was modernised and W.H.K. Baker (M.P) formally opened the modernised Clubhouse on 18 June 1971. In 1973 the purchase of 65 acres including the stables and Barnyards outbuildings was completed. Further extensive works including extensions were carried out in 1974 - 75 and the Clubhouse was the subject of a major refurbishment, mainly to the interior decor in 1988, with extensive refurbishment of the kitchen area following in 1996–97.

At the Annual General Meeting in December 2000 the membership authorised the Committee of the club to proceed with extensive redevelopment of the Clubhouse at an estimated cost of £400,000.

In November 2009, the course suffered server flooding.

In 2010 the club celebrated its centenary year. To commemorate this occasion, a number of centenary activities were arranged, mainly condensed into a ‘Week of Celebration’ running from Saturday 26 June to Saturday 3 July 2010

== Royal Heritage ==
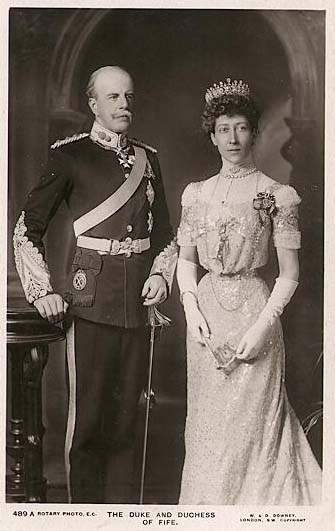

Alexander Duff (1849-1912) the 6th Earl was the last Duff to live, with his family, at Duff House. The 6th Earl of Fife, Alexander, was the Founder and Patron of the Golf Club. Aged 40, he astonished his close friend, Edward, Prince of Wales, by seeking to marry his eldest daughter, Louise, who was then just 22. Queen Victoria was delighted and the Earl was granted a Dukedom as befitted his marriage to a Royal Princess. The Earl was given a choice of titles but finally settled for the ancestral Fife. The marriage took place at Buckingham Palace on Saturday, 27 July 1889

Their enthusiasm for the Royal and Ancient game was boundless so much so that they employed a professional for the maintenance of the few holes which surrounded Duff House.

The couple gifted Duff house and 140 acres to the communities of Banff and Macduff in 1906, which in turn led to the development of the course and the ultimate ownership of the land by Duff House Royal Golf Club.

In December 1923 The Princess Louise expressed a wish to become Patroness of the club and desired that the Club become Duff House Royal Golf Club

== See also ==
- List of golf clubs granted Royal status
