= Royal Ascot Golf Club =

Golf club in Berkshire, England

- Location within Berkshire
- 51.41903°N 0.66643°W

Club information
- Location: Ascot, Berkshire, England
- Established: 1887
- Total holes: 18

== History ==
Royal Ascot Golf Club was established in 1887 and, later that same year, was granted permission by Queen Victoria to use the "Royal" prefix. It is Berkshire's second-oldest golf club and remains the county's only golf club to hold Royal status.

The club's original course was situated on Ascot Heath within the grounds of Ascot Racecourse. Among the notable championships staged there was the inaugural Boys Amateur Championship in 1921. The championship trophy was presented to The Royal and Ancient Golf Club of St Andrews and continues to be used for the annual event.

In 2000, following notice from the racecourse owners that the land would be required for redevelopment, the club began plans to relocate. A new site was secured at nearby Sunninghill Park, where construction of a purpose-built championship course and clubhouse commenced. Members moved into the new clubhouse in December 2004, with the official opening taking place in 2006. Golf continued on the original Ascot Heath course until August 2005 before play transferred permanently to the new venue.

The current course was designed by Jonathan Tucker of the Sports Turf Research Institute (STRI) and constructed by J & E Ely, the specialist golf course contractors who also carried out preparations for Royal Troon's hosting of The Open Championship in 2004.

== Course ==
The present course has been laid out across mature parkland featuring established oak, beech, ash, birch and larch woodland, together with natural ponds, brooks and designated wildlife habitats. The site supports a variety of native wildlife, including buzzards, roe deer and muntjac deer.

During construction, extensive tree planting was undertaken to complement the existing landscape, with many of those trees now forming established strategic features throughout the course.

The greens were built to United States Golf Association (USGA) specifications and, together with a modern drainage system, are designed to provide consistent playing surfaces throughout much of the year. The course is used for both members' golf and regional championship events and is recognised for offering a challenging but fair test for golfers of all abilities.

== Clubhouse and Community ==
The clubhouse includes a restaurant, bar, terrace, function rooms and meeting facilities, providing a venue for members, visitors and a wide range of private and corporate events. The club regularly hosts weddings, celebrations, business meetings, charity events and golf competitions throughout the year.

Alongside its golfing activities, Royal Ascot Golf Club has developed a wider role within the local community by supporting charitable initiatives, schools, sports organisations and community groups, as well as hosting regional and national golf events. The club's stated aim is to provide a welcoming environment for members, guests and visitors while serving as a community-focused venue for both golf and non-golf activities.

== See also ==
- List of golf clubs granted Royal status
