= List of golf clubs granted royal status =

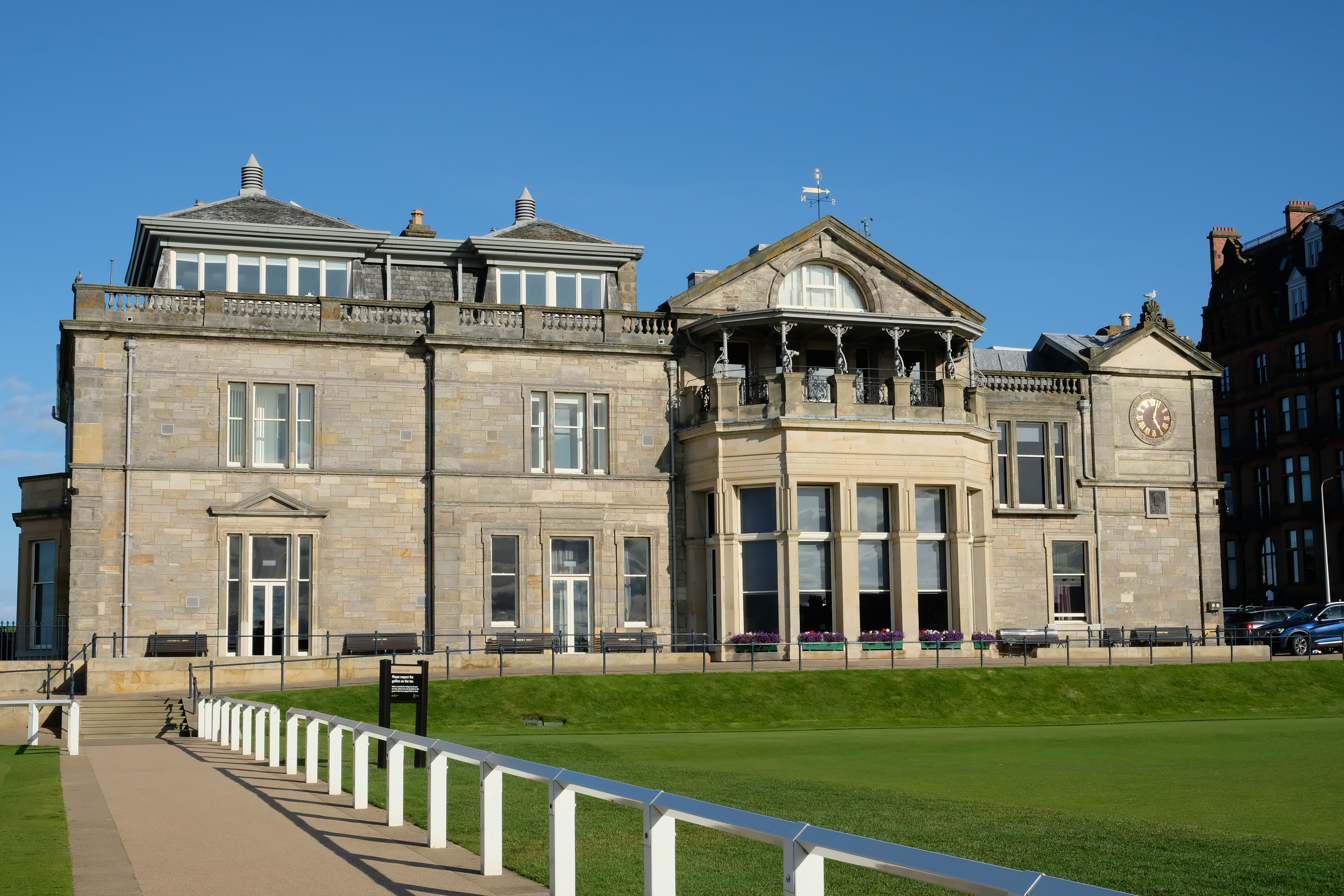
The Royal and Ancient Golf Club of St Andrews is possibly the most known "royal" golf club in the world, although not the earliest: that honour belongs to the Royal Perth Golfing Society.

This is a list of golf clubs that have been granted permission to bear the title "Royal", having been bestowed by a reigning monarch, such as the British, Spanish, Belgian, Nepalese, Dutch, or Swedish monarchs. To receive the honour of "Royal", the golf club would normally invite a member of the royal family to be a patron or an honorary member, or they apply for the title, which is granted by the reigning monarch. In Britain, the title "Royal" was restricted to "institutions of eminence, long standing and secure financial position, and devoted to national, charitable and scientific objects" by the British monarchy.

Not all golf clubs that have "Royal" in their title have royal status, for instance, the Royal Tara Golf Club in Ireland gave itself the title because the golf club is near the Hill of Tara where the ancient kings of Ireland once resided. The Royal Spring Golf Course in India is called Royal Springs because there are four natural water springs that were used back by Mughal emperors, hence it is said to be "royal". The now-defunct Royal Links Golf Club in Las Vegas, Nevada, had no royal connections at all; it was built to acknowledge the traditions of the game. It featured holes inspired by 11 different Open Championship courses, including the Old Course at St Andrews, Royal Liverpool, Hoylake, Royal Lytham & St Annes and Royal Birkdale. The Royal Automobile Club is a royal club but not a royal golf club because the club just happens to have a golf course. King Edward VII granted the royal status to the Automobile Club.

In Denmark, the Royal Copenhagen Golf Club's (Danish: Københavns Golf Klub) only connection with royalty is that the national park, which today includes the golf club, was established by the Danish King Christian V in the late 17th century, and King Frederik III's castle sits near the 16th hole. The course is also located in Kongens Lyngby, Danish for "the King's Heather Town". There is no evidence to show that the golf course has been granted a charter or similar document.

Not all royal golf clubs own their own golf course, the Royal Perth Golfing Society – the world's earliest 'royal' club – play on the North Inch Golf Course, the Royal and Ancient Golf Club of St Andrews play on St Andrews Links, the Royal Montrose Mercantile Golf Club play on Montrose Links, and the Royal Epping Forest Golf Club play on Chingford Golf Course, which are all public golf courses.

== Golf clubs granted royal status by the British monarchy ==
Denotes that the course is on the current Open Championship rota
Denotes that the course has previously hosted The Open Championship, but is not on the current rota

Monarch	Golf club	Location	Country	Year established	Year royal status granted	Refs
William IV	The Royal Perth Golfing Society & County and City Club	Perth	Scotland	1824	1833	
William IV	Royal and Ancient Golf Club of St Andrews (Note: Course is on the current Open Championship rota.) (formerly The Royal Society of St. Andrews Golfers).	St Andrews	Scotland	1745	1834	
Victoria	Royal Montrose Mercantile Golf Club (formerly Montrose Royal Albert Golf Club)	Montrose	Scotland	1810	1845	
Victoria	Royal Blackheath Golf Club	Eltham	England	1608	1845	
Victoria	Royal North Devon Golf Club	Westward Ho!	England	1864	1867	
Victoria	Royal Liverpool Golf Club	Hoylake	England	1869	1871	
Victoria	Royal Musselburgh Golf Club	Prestonpans	Scotland	1774	1876	
Victoria	Royal Jersey Golf Club	Grouville	Jersey	1878	1879	
Victoria	Royal Wimbledon Golf Club	Wimbledon	England	1865	1882	
Victoria	Royal Isle of Wight Golf Club (1882–1961)	Isle of Wight	England	1882	1883	
Victoria	Royal Montreal Golf Club	Île Bizard	Canada	1873	1884	
Victoria	Royal Belfast Golf Club	Craigavad	Ireland, now Northern Ireland	1881	1885	
Victoria	Royal Ascot Golf Club	Ascot	England	1887	1887	
Victoria	Royal Eastbourne Golf Club	Eastbourne	England	1887	1887	
Victoria	Royal Malta Golf Club	Marsa	Malta	1888	1888	
Victoria	Royal Cromer Golf Club	Cromer	England	1888	1888	
Victoria	Royal Epping Forest Golf Club	Chingford	England	1888	1888	
Victoria	Royal Guernsey Golf Club	L'Ancresse	Guernsey	1890	1891	
Victoria	The Royal Dublin Golf Club	Dollymount	Ireland	1885	1891	
Victoria	Royal Cornwall Golf Club (1889–1950s)	Bodmin	England	1889	1891	
Victoria	Royal West Norfolk Golf Club	Brancaster	England	1892	1892	
Victoria	Royal Portrush Golf Club	Portrush	Ireland, now Northern Ireland	1888	1892	
Victoria	Royal Ashdown Forest Golf Club	Forest Row	England	1888	1893	
Victoria	Royal Norwich Golf Club	Norwich	England	1893	1893	
Victoria	Royal Eastbourne Ladies’ Golf Club (1893–1937) merged with Royal Eastbourne Golf Club in 1937	Eastbourne	England	1893	1893	
Victoria	Royal Worlington and Newmarket Golf Club	Bury St Edmunds	England	1893	1895	
Victoria	Royal Melbourne Golf Club	Black Rock	Australia	1891	1895	
Victoria	Royal Sydney Golf Club	Rose Bay	Australia	1893	1897	
Victoria	Royal Hong Kong Golf Club (1889–1996), now Hong Kong Golf Club (1996-date)	Sheung Shui	Hong Kong, now China	1889	1897	
Edward VII	Royal Household Golf Club	Windsor Castle	England	1901	1901	
Edward VII	Royal St George's Golf Club	Sandwich	England	1887	1902	
Edward VII	Royal Aberdeen Golf Club	Bridge of Don	Scotland	1780	1903	
Edward VII	Royal Dornoch Golf Club	Dornoch	Scotland	1877	1906	
Edward VII	Royal County Down Golf Club	Newcastle	Ireland, now Northern Ireland	1889	1908	
Edward VII	Royal St David's Golf Club	Harlech	Wales	1894	1908	
Edward VII	Royal Porthcawl Golf Club	Rest Bay	Wales	1891	1909	
Edward VII	Royal Craggan Golf Club (1909–1939)	Mar Lodge	Scotland	1909	1909	
Edward VII	Royal Cinque Ports Golf Club (Note: Course was formerly on the Open Championship rota)	Deal	England	1892	1910	
Edward VII	Royal Curragh Golf Club (1910–1922 and 2013-date)	Curragh	Ireland	1858	1910	
George V	Royal Cape Golf Club	Wynberg	South Africa	1885	1910	
George V	Royal Calcutta Golf Club	Tollygunge	British India, now India	1829	1910	
George V	The Royal Ottawa Golf Club	Gatineau	Canada	1891	1912	
George V	Royal Winchester Golf Club	Winchester	England	1888	1913	
George V	Royal Queensland Golf Club	Eagle Farm	Australia	1920	1921	
George V	Royal Adelaide Golf Club	Seaton	Australia	1892	1923	
George V	Royal Port Alfred Golf Club	Port Alfred	South Africa	1924	1924	
George V	Duff House Royal Golf Club	Banff	Scotland	1909	1925	
George V	Royal Hobart Golf Club	Hobart	Australia	1901	1926	
George V	Royal Lytham & St Annes Golf Club (Note: Course has hosted the Ryder Cup.)	Lytham St Annes	England	1886	1926	
George V	Royal Mid-Surrey Golf Club	Richmond	England	1892	1926	
George V	Royal Tarlair Golf Club	Macduff	Scotland	1925	1926	
George V	Royal Colombo Golf Club	Colombo	British Ceylon, now Sri Lanka	1897	1928	
George V	Royal Burgess Golfing Society of Edinburgh	Barnton	Scotland	1773	1929	
George V	Royal Harare Golf Club (formerly Royal Salisbury Golf Club)	Salisbury, now Harare	Southern Rhodesia, now Zimbabwe	1898	1929	
George V	Royal Fremantle Golf Club	Fremantle	Australia	1905	1930	
George V	Royal Colwood Golf Club	Victoria	Canada	1913	1931	
George V	Royal Johannesburg & Kensington Golf Club	Johannesburg	South Africa	1890	1931	
George V	Royal Durban Golf Club	Greyville	South Africa	1892	1932	
George V	Royal Ashdown Forest Ladies Golf Club merged with Royal Ashdown Forest Golf Club after WW2	Forest Row	England	1889	1932	
George V	Royal Canberra Golf Club	Yarralumla	Australia	1926	1933	
George V	Royal Quebec Golf Club	Boischatel	Canada	1874	1934	
George V	Royal Nairobi Golf Club	Nairobi	Kenya	1906	1935	
George VI	Royal Perth Golf Club	South Perth	Australia	1895	1937	
George VI	Royal Singapore Golf Club (1891–1962) merged with the Royal Island Club in 1962 now the Singapore Island Country Club (1962-date)	Singapore	Straits Settlements, now Singapore	1891	1938	
George VI	Royal Birkdale Golf Club	Southport	England	1889	1951	
Elizabeth II
Elizabeth II	Royal Island Club (1952–1962) merged with the Royal Singapore Golf Club in 1962 now the Singapore Island Country Club (1962-date)	Singapore	Singapore	1952	1952	
Elizabeth II	Royal Selangor Golf Club	Kuala Lumpur	Malaysia	1893	1953	
Elizabeth II	Royal Troon Golf Club	Troon	Scotland	1878	1978	
Elizabeth II	Royal Regina Golf Club	Regina	Canada	1899	1999	
Elizabeth II	Royal Golf Club Mariánské Lázně	Mariánské Lázně	Czech Republic	1905	2003	
Elizabeth II	Royal Wellington Golf Club	Heretaunga	New Zealand	1895	2004	
Elizabeth II	Royal Mayfair Golf Club	Edmonton	Canada	1921	2005	
Elizabeth II	Royal Auckland Golf Club	Papatoetoe	New Zealand	1894	2010	
Elizabeth II	Royal Port Moresby Golf Club	Port Moresby	Papua New Guinea	1930	2012	
Elizabeth II	Royal Homburger Golf Club	Bad Homburg vor der Höhe	Germany	1899	2013	
	Royal Balmoral Golf Club	Balmoral Estate, Aberdeenshire	Scotland	1973	2025	
Not known	Royal Bombay Gymkhana Golf Club (1842–1947)	Bombay, now Mumbai	British India, now India	1842	Not known	
Not known	Royal Western India Golf Club (1889–unknown)	Nashik	British India, now India	1889	Not known	

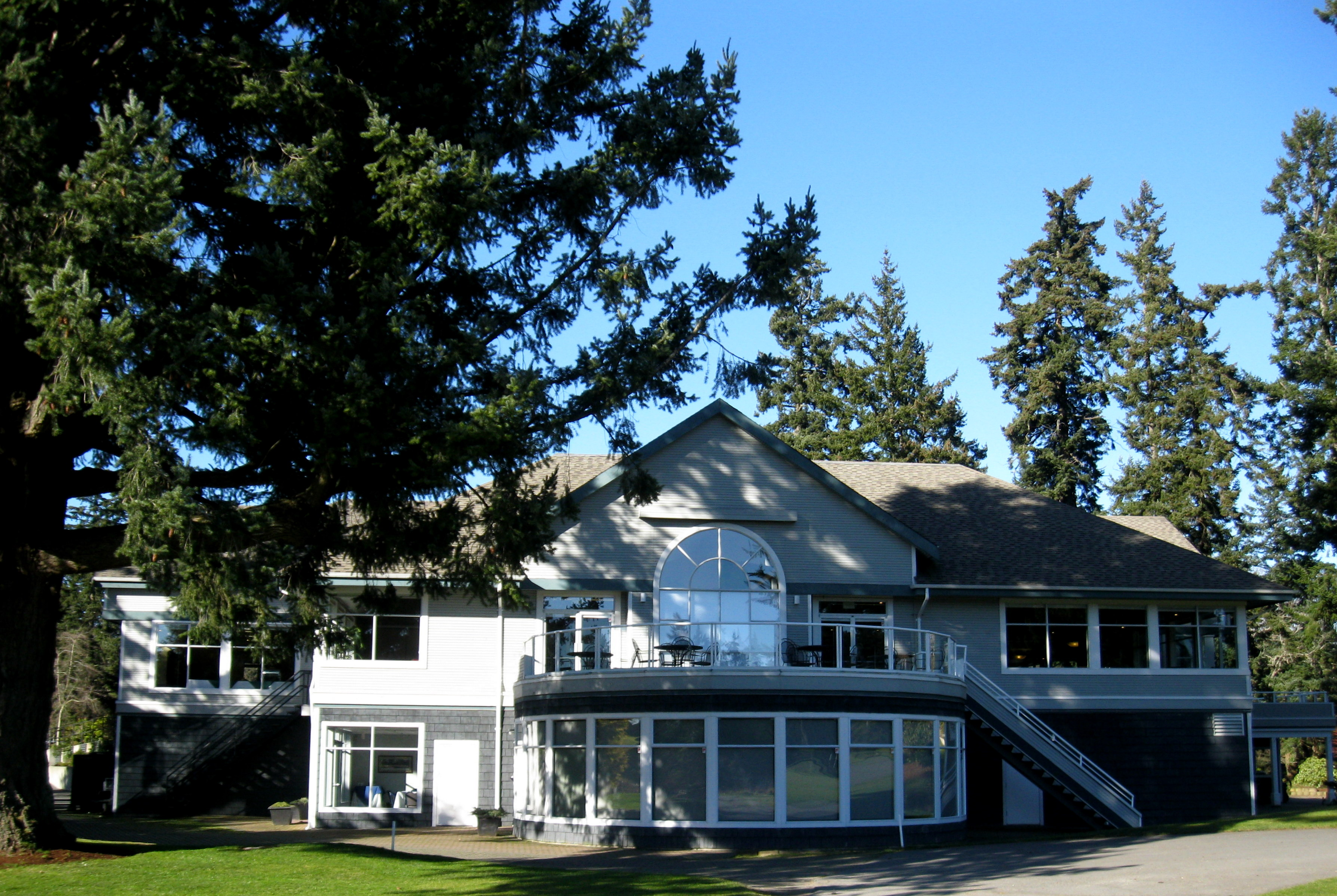
Royal Colwood Golf Club clubhouse, Canada

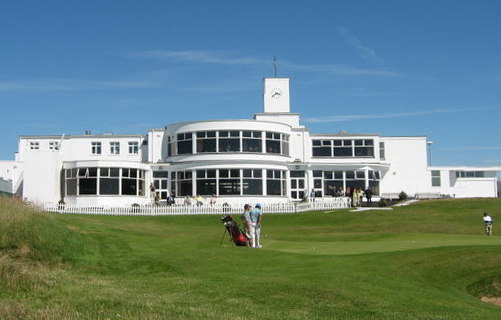
Royal Birkdale Golf Club clubhouse, England

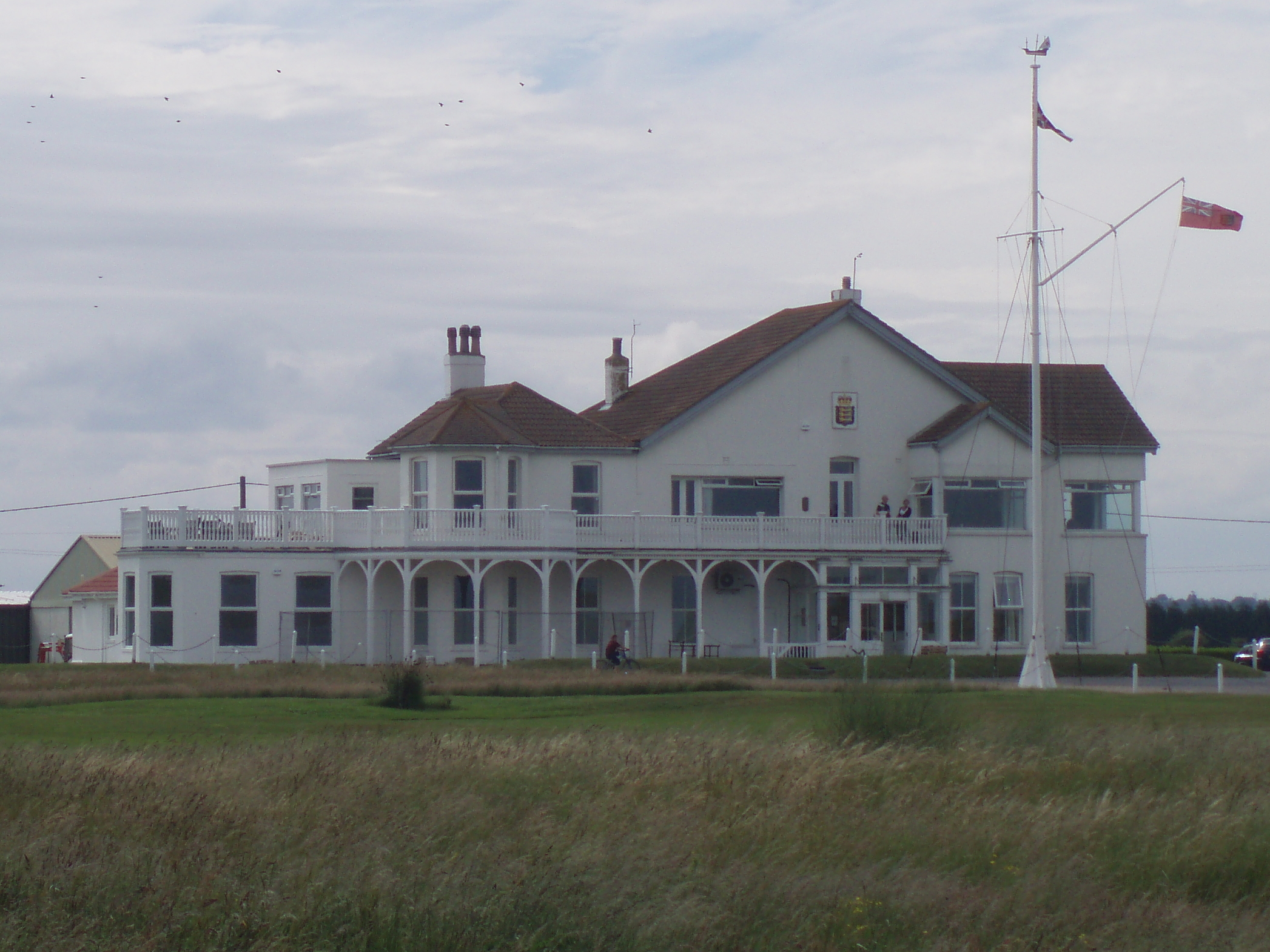
Royal Cinque Ports Golf Club clubhouse, England

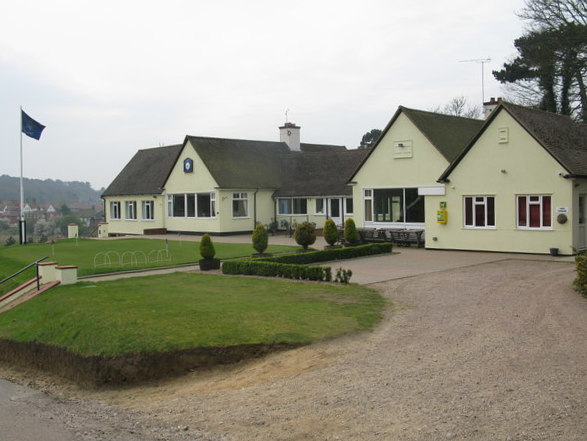
Royal Cromer Golf Club clubhouse, England

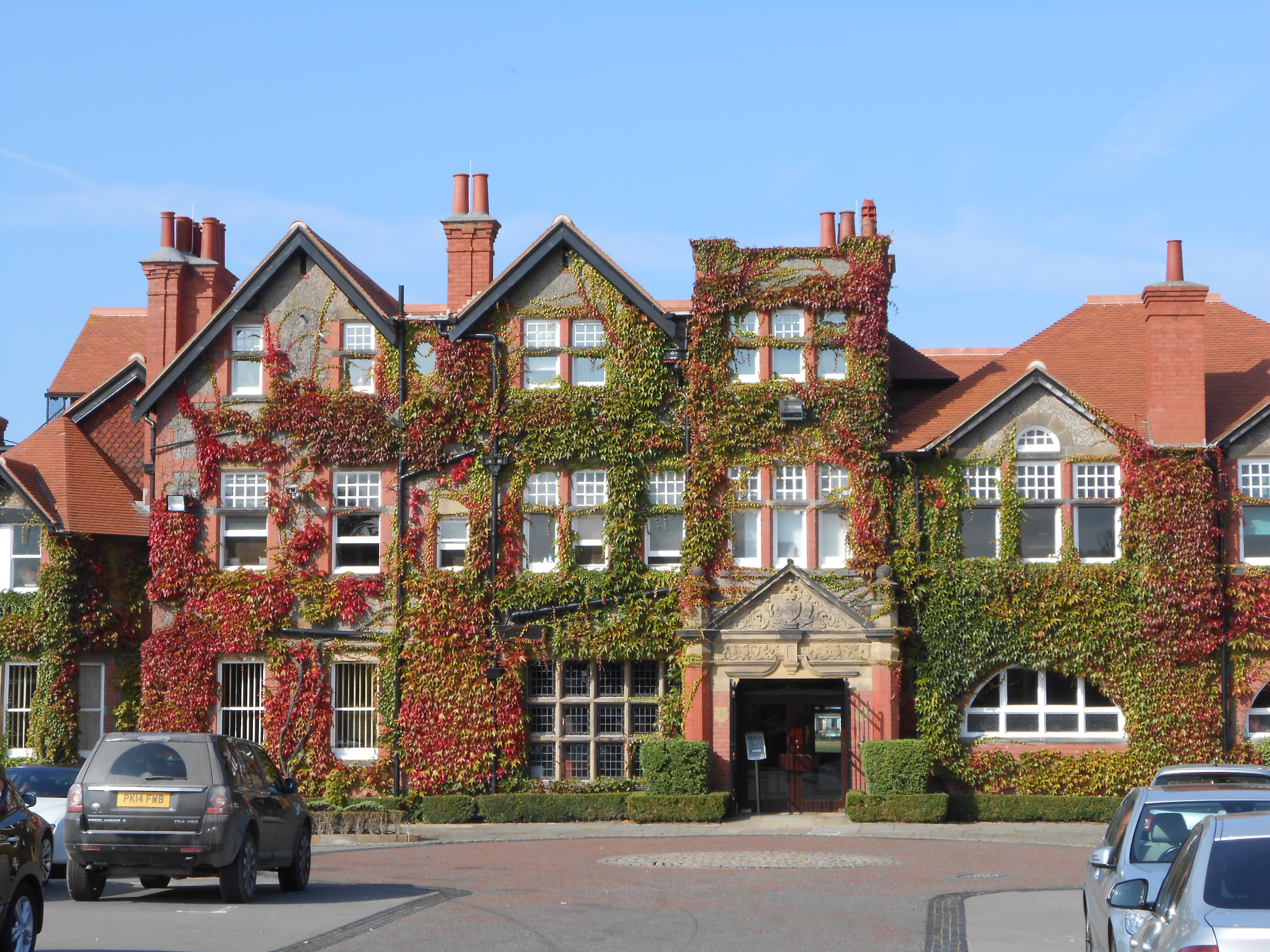
Royal Liverpool Golf Club clubhouse, England

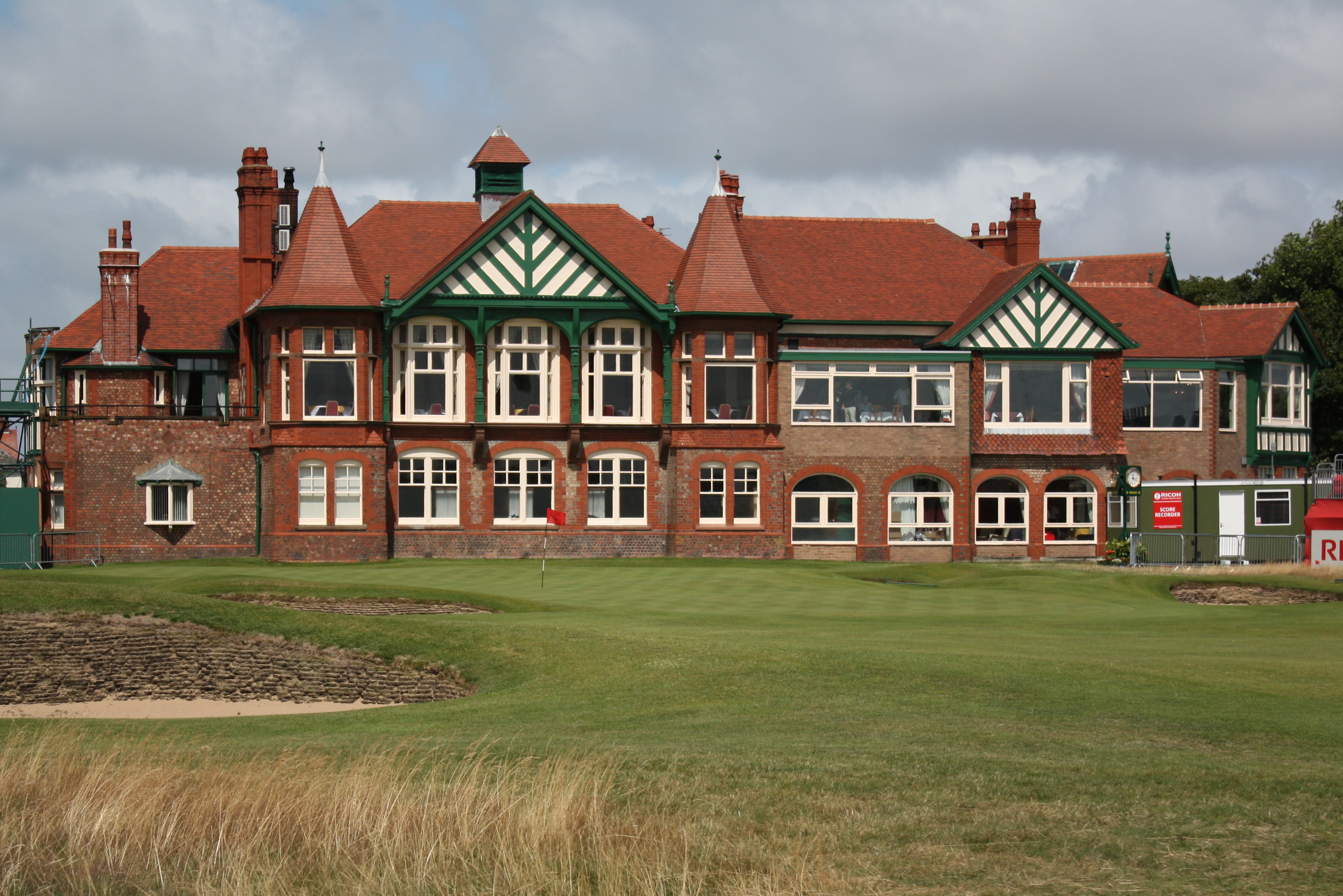
Royal Lytham & St Annes Golf Club clubhouse, England

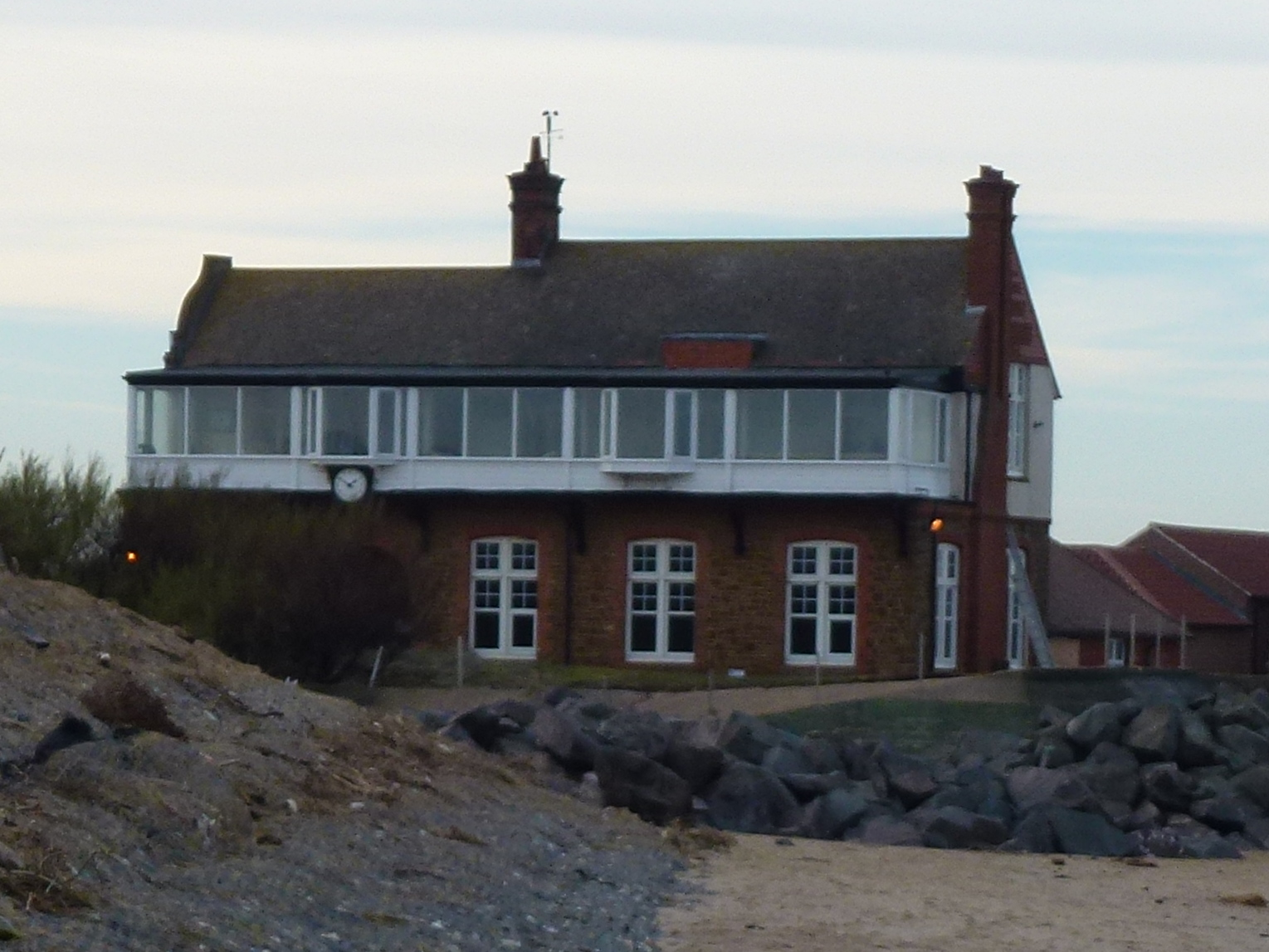
Royal West Norfolk Golf Club clubhouse, England

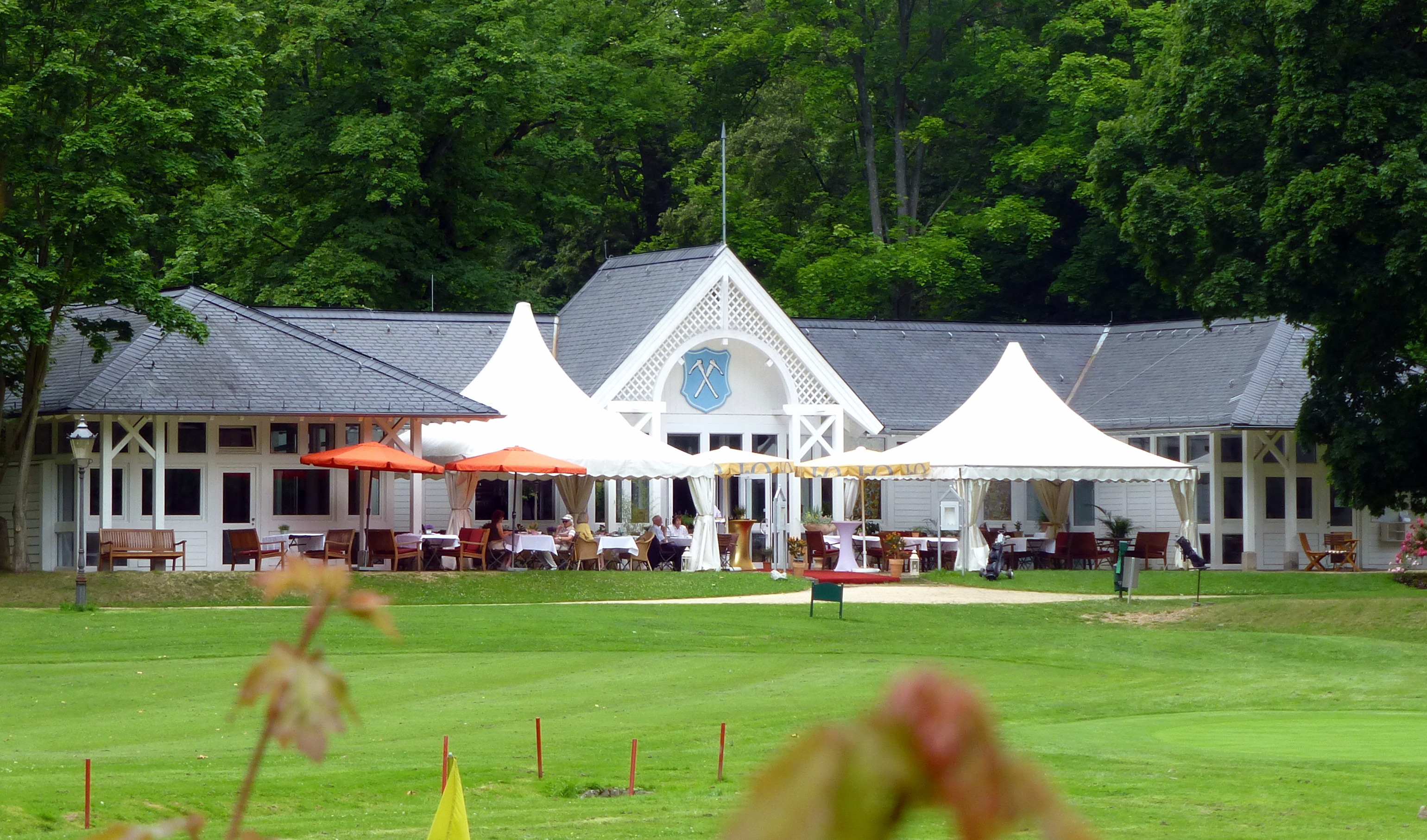
Royal Homburger Golf Club clubhouse, Germany

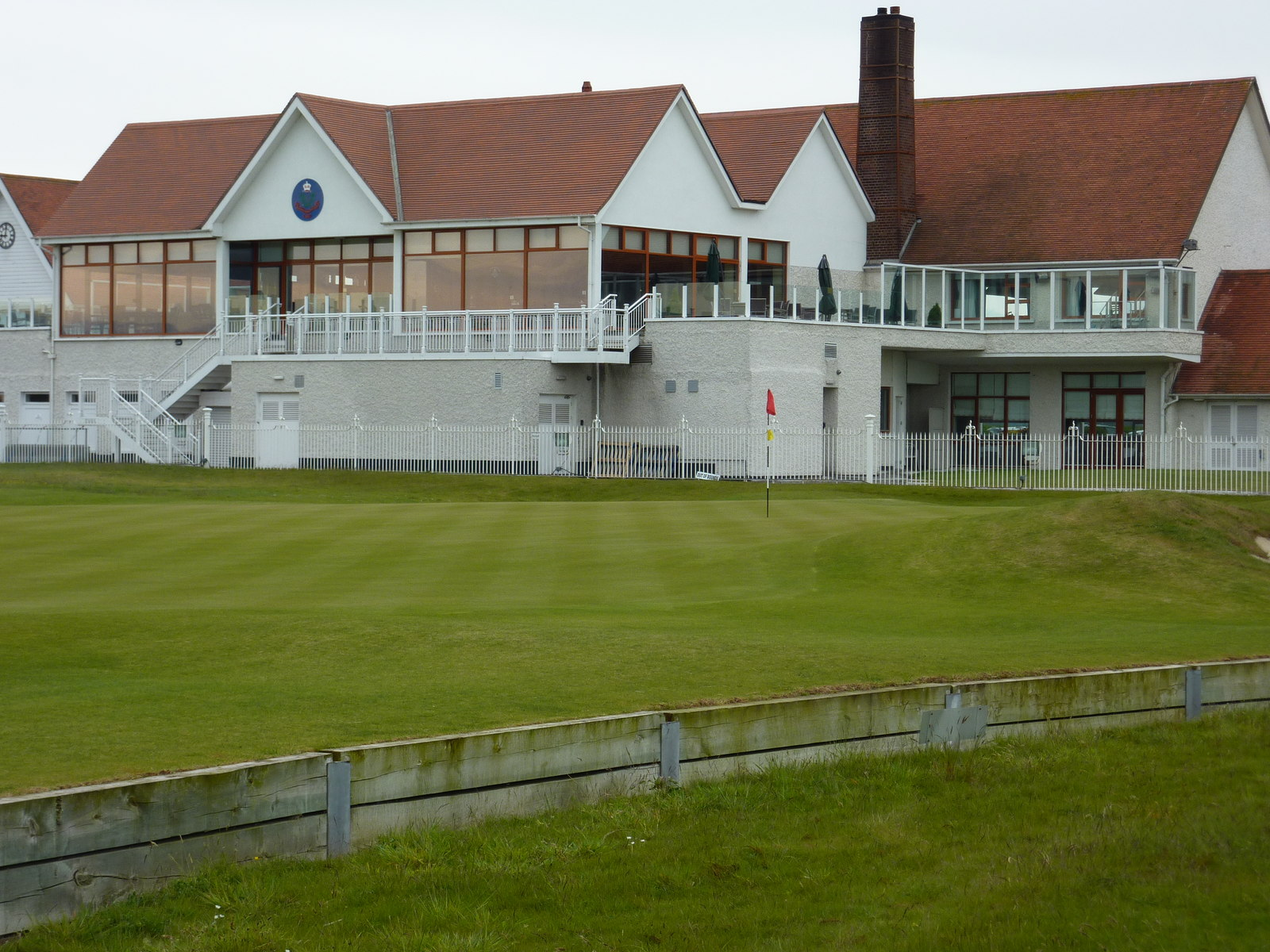
The Royal Dublin Golf Club clubhouse, Republic of Ireland

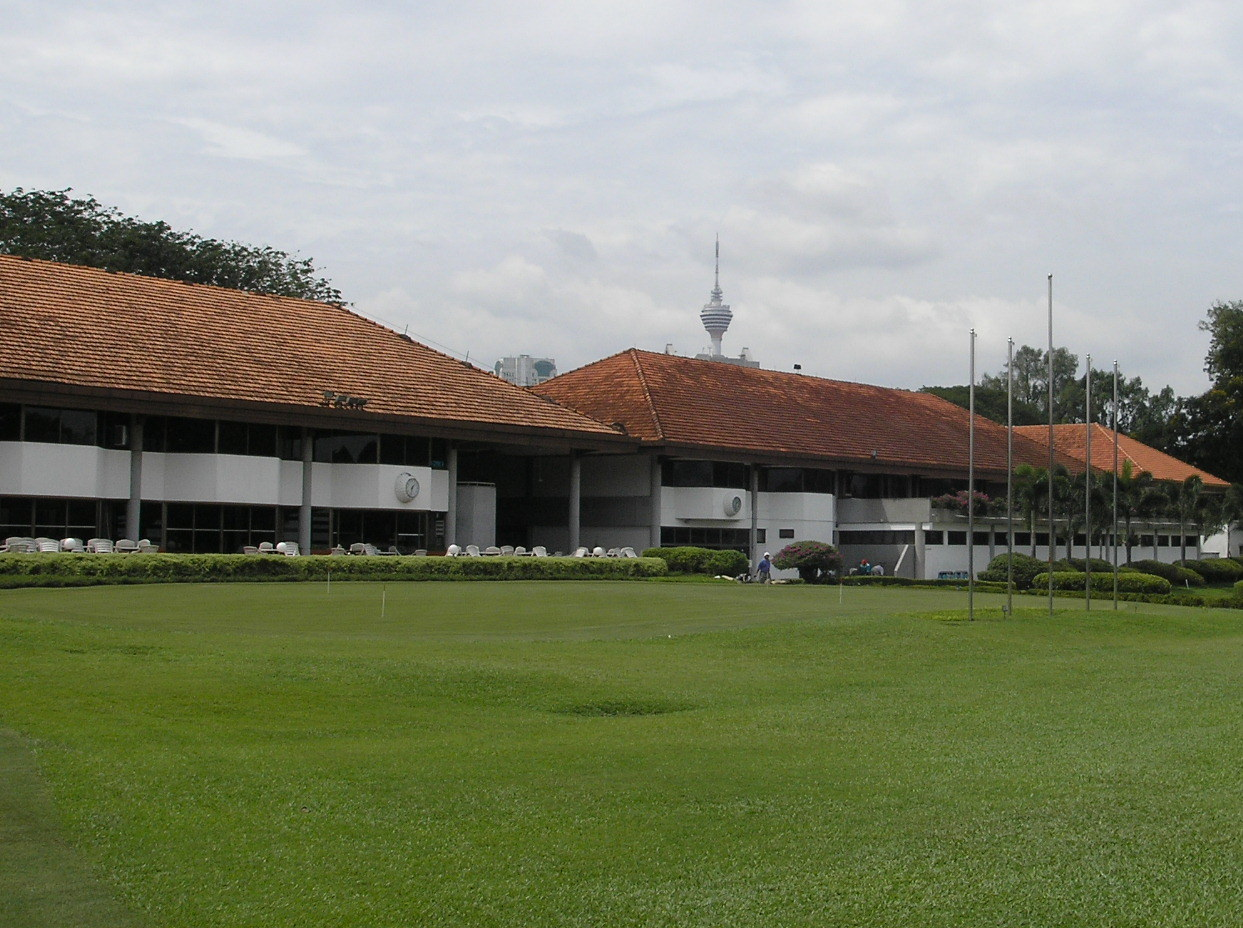
Royal Selangor Golf Club clubhouse, Malaysia

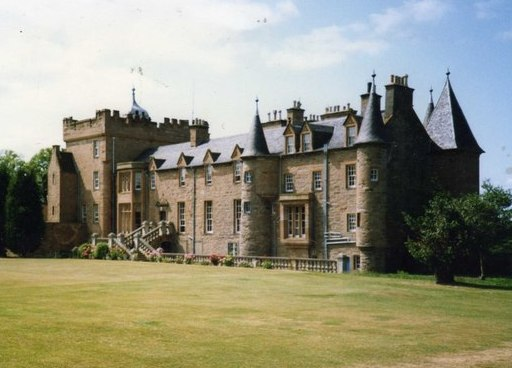
Royal Musselburgh Golf Club clubhouse, Scotland

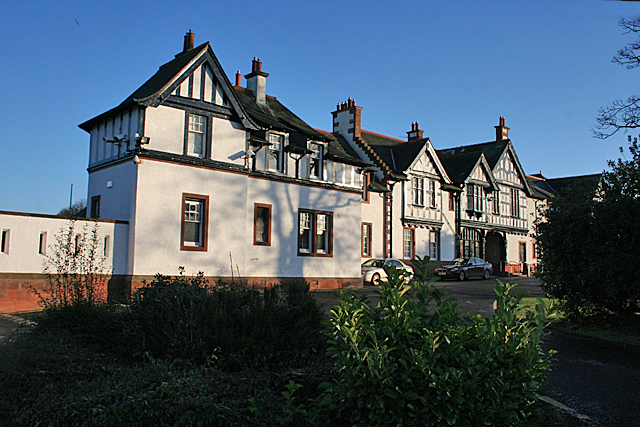
The Royal Perth Golfing Society & County and City Club clubhouse, Scotland

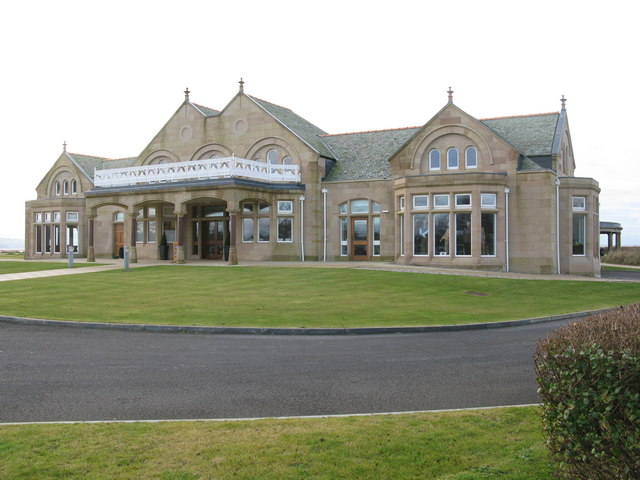
Royal Troon Golf Club clubhouse, Scotland

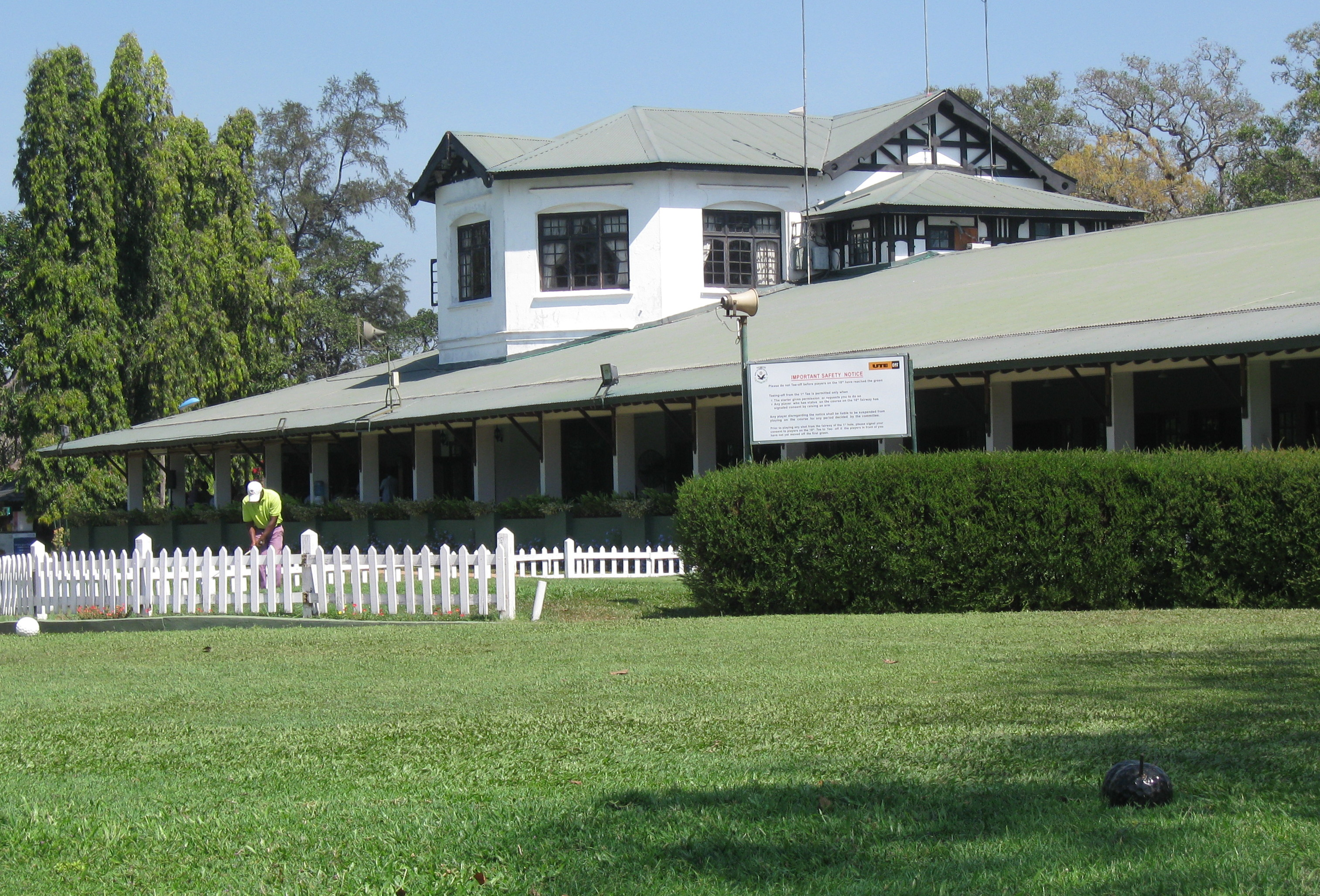
Royal Colombo Golf Club clubhouse, Sri Lanka

== Golf clubs granted royal status by the Spanish monarchy ==
Denotes that the course has previously hosted the Open de España

Monarch	Golf club (Note: Real in Spanish translates to "royal" in English.)	Location	Year established	Year royal status granted	Ref(s)
Alfonso XIII	Real Sociedad Hípica Española Club de Campo (Note: Course has previously hosted the Open de España.)	San Sebastián de los Reyes	1901	1909	
Alfonso XIII	Real Club de la Puerta de Hierro	Madrid	1895	1912	
Alfonso XIII	Real Golf De Pedreña	Pedreña	1928	1928	
Alfonso XIII	Real Club de Golf Cerdaña	Puigcerdà	1929	Not known	
Alfonso XIII	Real Golf Club de Zarauz	Zarautz	1916	Not known	
Alfonso XIII	Club Jarama R.A.C.E. (Real Automóvil Club de España)	Madrid	1929	Not known	
Alfonso XIII	Real Club de Golf El Prat (formerly Golf Club de Pedrables)	Terrassa	1954	Not known	
Juan Carlos	Real Club de Golf de Las Palmas	Las Palmas	1891	1986	
Juan Carlos	Real Club de Golf de Tenerife	Tacoronte	1896	1989	
Juan Carlos	Real Club de Golf Sotogrande	Sotogrande	1964	1994	
Juan Carlos	Real Club de Golf Las Brisas	Marbella	1968	1995	
Juan Carlos	Real Club de Golf de Sevilla	Alcalá de Guadaíra	1991	2002	
Juan Carlos	Real Club de Golf de La Coruña	La Coruña	1962	2007	
Juan Carlos	Real Club de Golf Guadalmina	San Pedro de Alcántara	1959	2008	
Juan Carlos	Real Club Valderrama	Sotogrande	1974	2014	
Juan Carlos	Real Club Pineda de Sevilla	Seville	1939	Not known	
Felipe VI	Real Novo Sancti Petri Golf Club	Cádiz	1990	2016	
Felipe VI	Real Golf La Manga Club	Cartagena	1972	2017	
Felipe VI	Real Guadalhorce Club de Golf	Málaga	1987	2017	
Felipe VI	Real Club La Moraleja	Alcobendas	1973	2018	
Not known	Real Sociedad de Golf de Neguri	Getxo	1911	Not known	
Not known	Real Club de Campo de Málaga	Málaga	1926	Not known	
Not known	Real Club de Golf Madrid La Herrería	San Lorenzo de El Escorial	1966	Not known	
Not known	Real Golf de Bendinat	Bendinat	1986	Not known	
Not known	Real Nuevo Club Golf De San Sebastián Basozabal	Gipuzkoa	1994	Not known	

== Golf clubs granted royal status by the Belgian monarchy ==
With some exceptions, Belgian golf clubs automatically adopt the title of Royal after they have been in operation for 50 years.

Denotes that the course has previously hosted the Belgian Open

Monarch	Golf club	Location	Year established	Year royal status granted	Ref(s)
Leopold II	Royal Ostend Golf Club (Dutch: Koninklijke Golf Club Oostende)	De Haan	1903	1903	
Leopold II	Royal Golf Club of Belgium (Note: Course has previously hosted the Belgian Open) (Dutch: Koninklijke Golf Club van België; French: Royal Golf Club de Belgique)	Tervuren	1906	1906	
Albert	Royal Zoute Golf Club	Knokke-Heist	1898	1925	
Leopold III	Royal Antwerp Golf Club	Kapellen	1888	1938	
Leopold III	Royal Golf Club du Château Royal d'Ardenne (English: Royal Golf Club at the Royal Castle of Ardenne)	Ardennes	1895	1945	
Baudouin	Royal Latem Golf Club	Sint-Martens-Latem	1909	1959	
Baudouin	Royal Waterloo Golf Club	Lasne	1923	1973	
Baudouin	Royal Golf Club des Fagnes	Spa	1930	1980	
Baudouin	Royal Golf Club du Hainaut	Jurbise	1933	1983	
Baudouin	Royal Golf Club du Sart Tilman	Angleur	1939	1989	
Philippe	Royal Limburg Golf Club (Dutch: Koninklijke Limburg Golfclub)	Houthalen-Helchteren	1966	2016	
Philippe	Royal Bercuit Golf Club	Grez-Doiceau	1967	2017	
Philippe	Royal Keerbergen Golf Club	Keerbergen	1968	2018	
Philippe	Royal Golf Club Oudenaarde	Wortegem-Petegem	1971	2021	

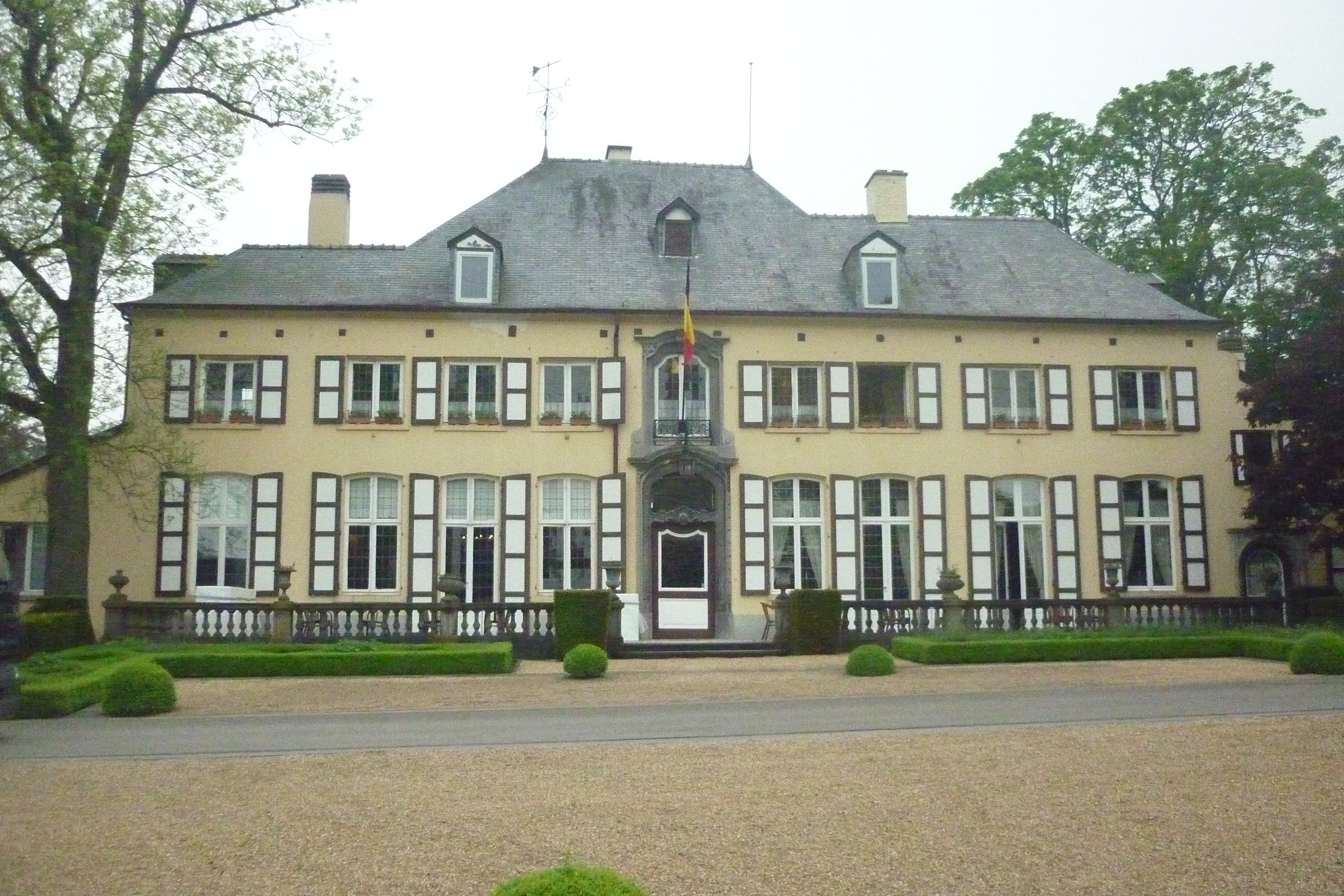
Royal Golf Club of Belgium clubhouse

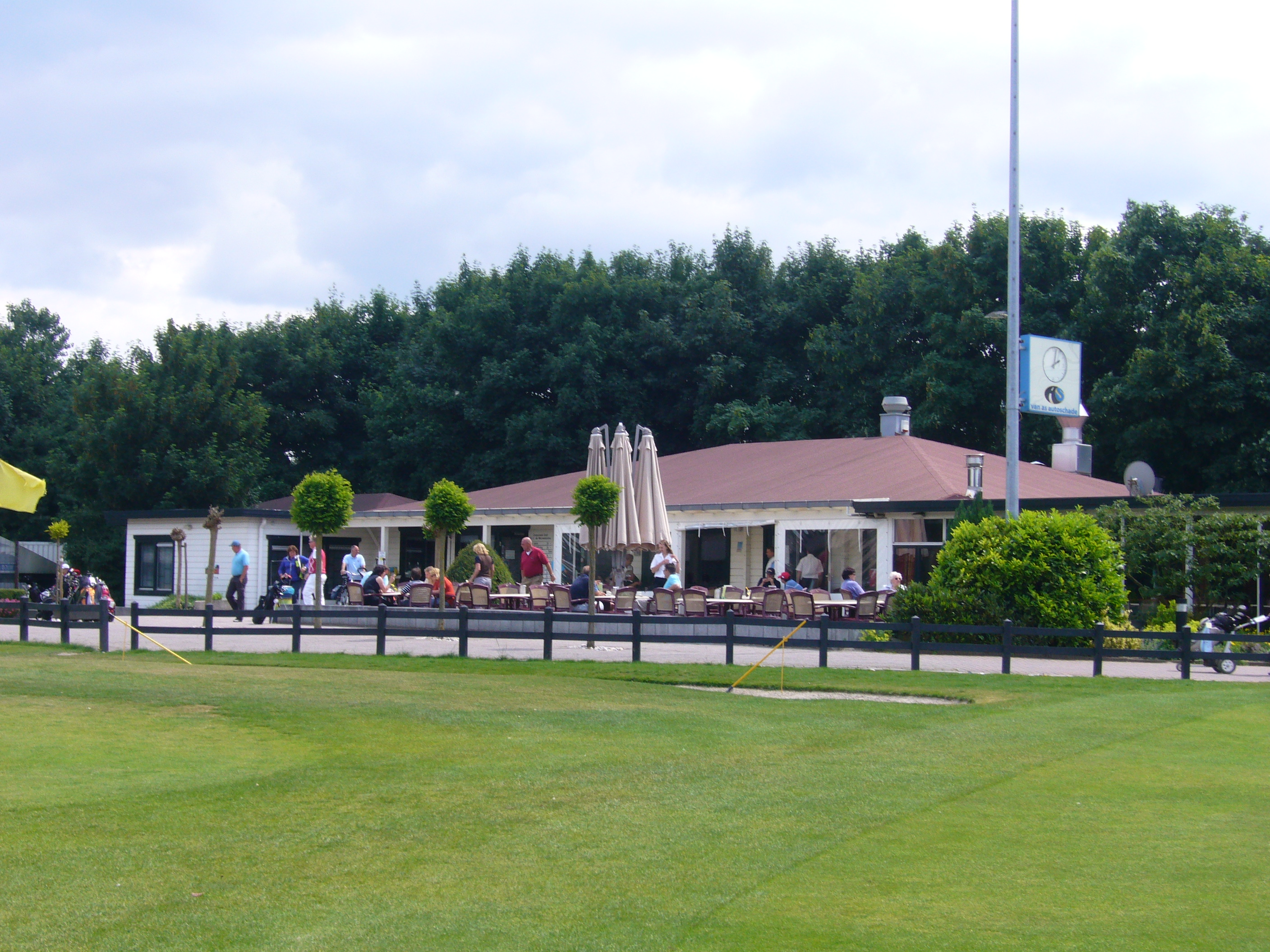
Royal Waterloo Golf Club clubhouse

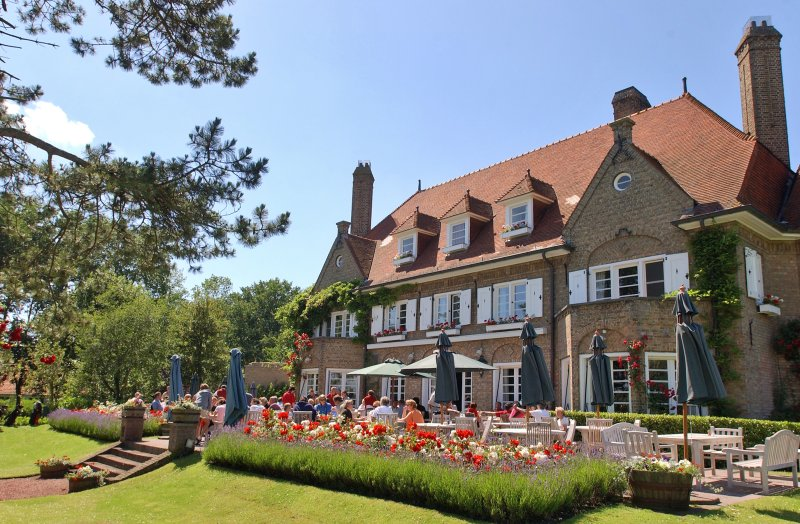
Royal Zoute Golf Club clubhouse

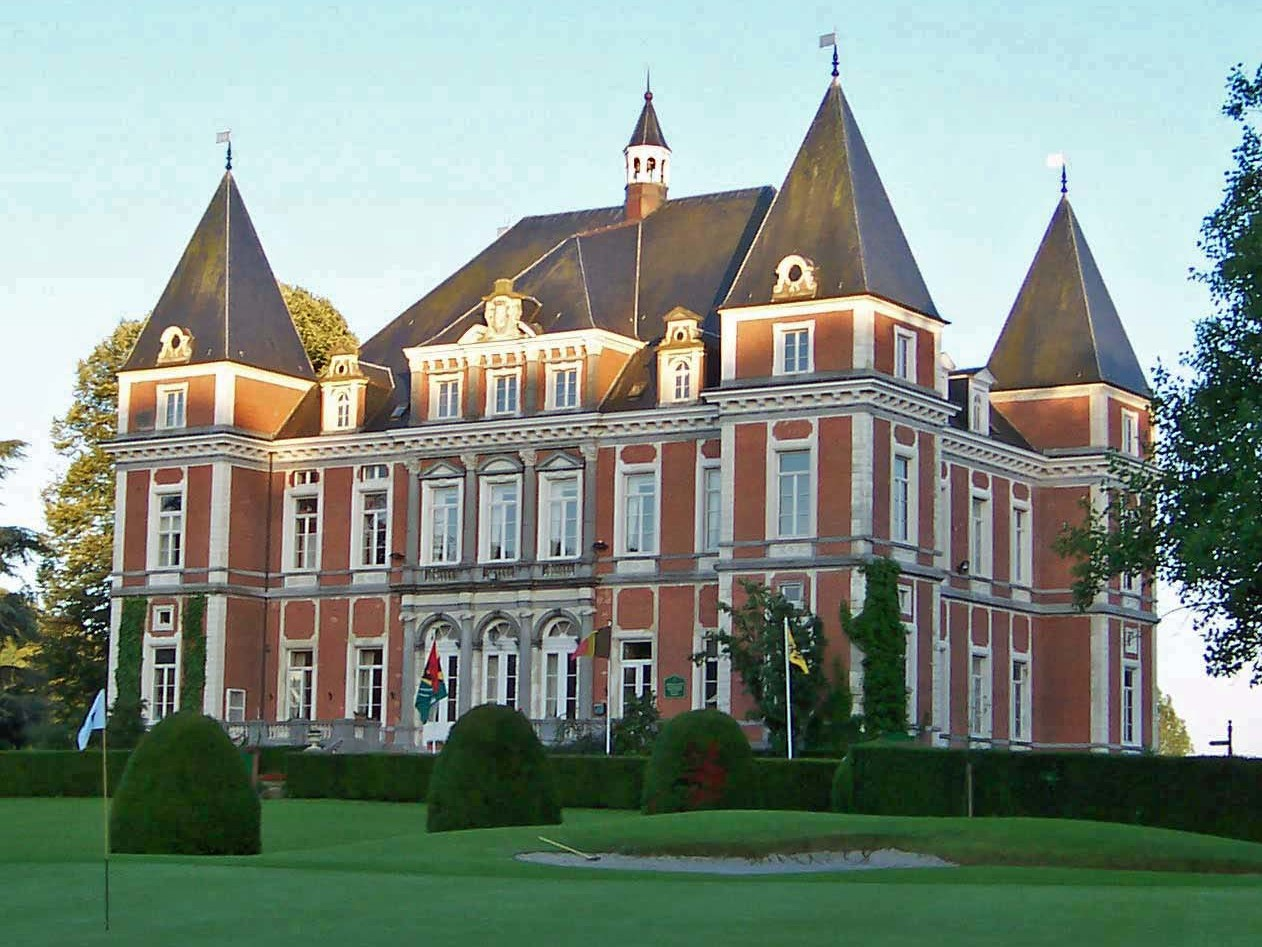
Royal Golf Club Oudenaarde clubhouse

== Golf clubs granted royal status by other monarchies ==
Denotes that the course has previously hosted the BTC Slovenian Open
Denotes that the course has previously hosted the Volvo Open and the Scandinavian Enterprise Open
Denotes that the course has previously hosted the KLM Dutch Open
Denotes that the course has previously hosted the Royal Swazi Sun Open

Monarch	Golf club	Location	Country	Year established	Year royal status granted	Ref(s)
Not known	Royal Baghdad Golf Club (1920s–1958) (Arabic: نادي بغداد الملكي للجولف)	Baghdad	Kingdom of Iraq	1920s	Not known	
Chulalongkorn (Rama V)	Royal Bangkok Sports Club (golf section) (Thai: ราชกรีฑาสโมสร)	Bangkok	Thailand	1906	1906	
Vajiravudh (Rama VI)	Royal Dusit Golf Club (Thai: สนามกอล์ฟรอยัลดุสิต)	Bangkok	Thailand	1916	1916	
Princess Elizabeth	Royal Bled Golf Club (Slovene: Kraljevski Bled Golf Klub)	Lesce	Slovenia	1937	2017	
Gustaf VI Adolf	Royal Drottningholm Golf Club (Note: Course has previously hosted the Volvo Open and the Scandinavian Enterprise Open.) (Swedish: Kungliga Drottningholms Golfklubb)	Drottningholm	Sweden	1959	1959	
Beatrix	Royal Hague Golf & Country Club (Note: Course has previously hosted the Dutch/KLM Open.) (Dutch: Koninklijke Haagsche Golf & Country Club)	Wassenaar	Netherlands	1893	1993	
Mahendra	Royal Nepal Golf Club (Nepali: रोयल नेपाल गोल्फ क्लब)	Kathmandu	Nepal	1917	1965	
Sobhuza II	Royal Swazi Spa Country Club (Note: Course has previously hosted the Royal Swazi Open.)	Mbabane	Swaziland	1966	1966	
Charlotte	Grand-Ducal Golf-Club (Note: Golf club granted grand ducal status. The Grand Duchess Charlotte of Luxembourg authorised the golf club to display her colors, orange and blue. The term grand-ducal is defined as relating to, or befitting a grand duke or grand duchess.)	Senningerberg	Luxembourg	1936	1936	

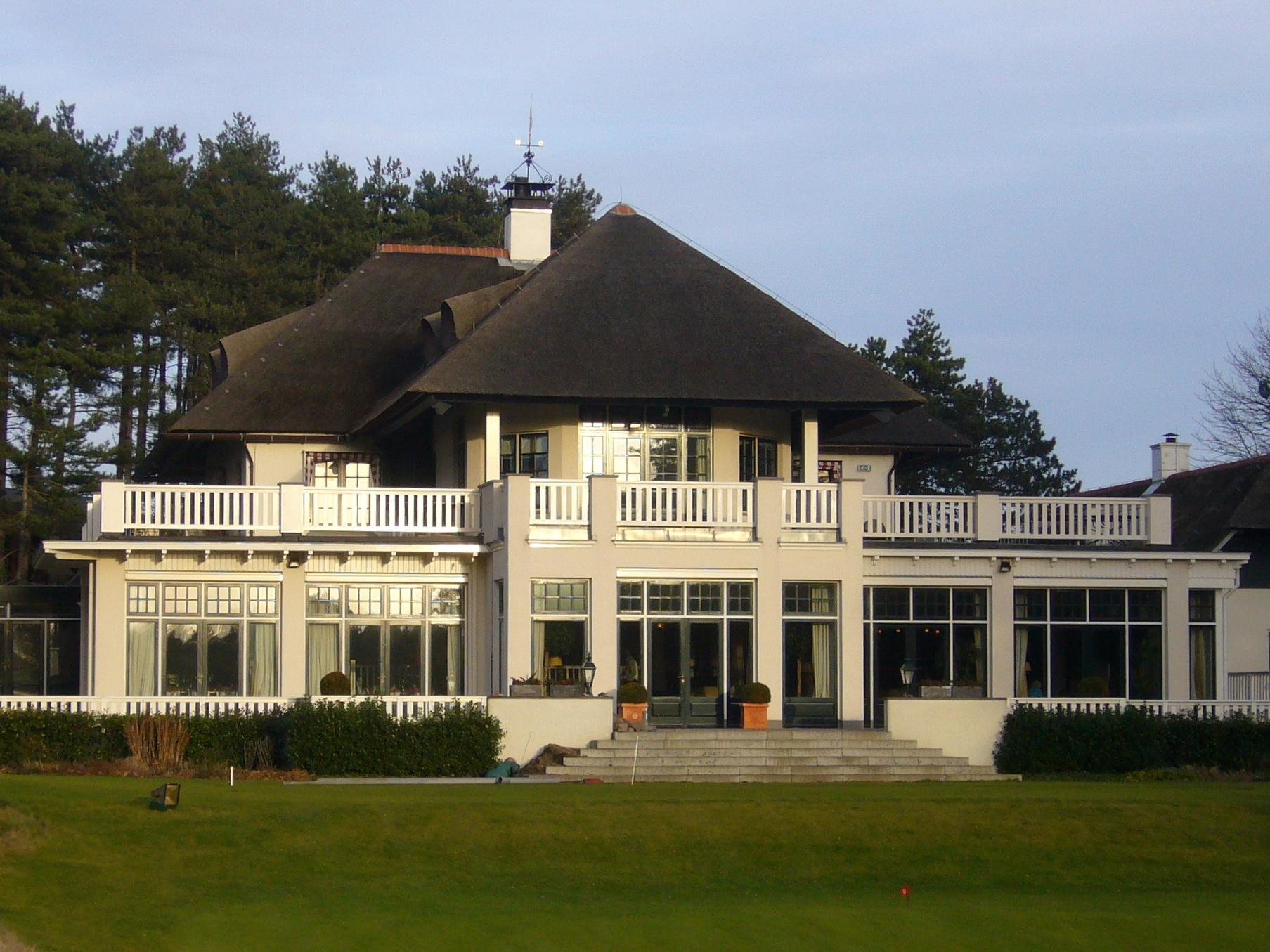
The Royal Hague Golf & Country Club clubhouse, Netherlands

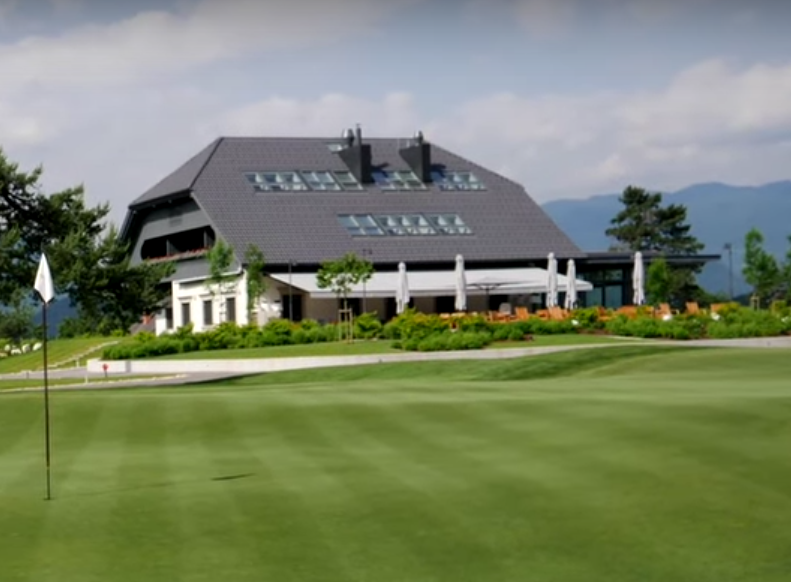
Royal Bled Golf Club clubhouse, Slovenia

== See also ==
- The R&A
