= Royal Worlington and Newmarket Golf Club =

Golf club in Suffolk, England

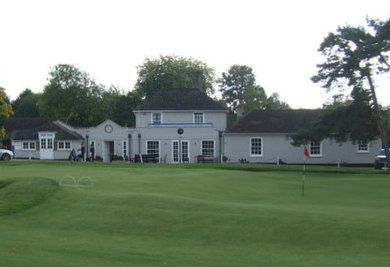
- The clubhouse
- Interactive map of Royal Worlington and Newmarket Golf Club
- 52.3312°N 0.4917°E

Club information
- Location: Golf Links Road, Worlington, Bury St Edmunds
- Established: 1893
- Type: Private
- Total holes: 9
- Website: www.royalworlington.co.uk
- Par: 35
- Length: 3,155 yards

The Royal Worlington and Newmarket Golf Club is a golf club located near Bury St Edmunds in Suffolk, England.

The nine-hole layout is consistently ranked in the top 100 courses in Britain and Ireland, and the "Sacred Nine" (as described by Bernard Darwin) is reputed to be the best nine-hole course in the world.

The club was founded in 1893, and has been home to the Cambridge University Golf Club for over 100 years. Harry Colt was the first Cambridge Blue Captain in 1889. Many well-known and colourful amateur golfers have graced the club since and as one reviewer put it, "there seems more history per hole than at any other club in England".

The course is known for its difficult green complexes, and sandy soil that allows for excellent conditioning even in the winter. Royal Worlington's nine-hole course includes two par fives, three par threes, and four par fours (par 35), and measures 3155 yards.

== See also ==
- List of golf clubs granted Royal status
