= Henry Augustus Smyth =

British Army general

General Sir Henry Augustus Smyth KCMG FSA FRGS
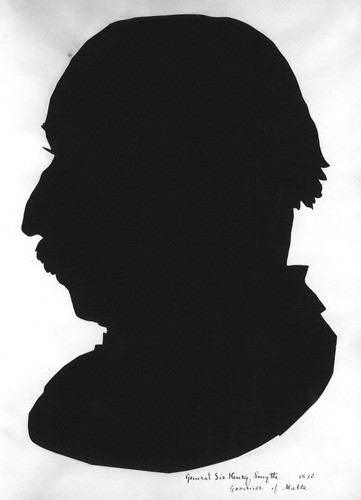
- Sir Henry Smyth, by his nephew, Francis Smyth Baden-Powell
- Born: 25 November 1825; St James's Street, London
- Died: 19 September 1906 (aged 80); Stone, Buckinghamshire
- Burial place: Stone, Buckinghamshire
- Spouse: Helen Constance Greaves (m. 1874)
- Relatives: William Henry Smyth (father)
- Military career
- Allegiance: United Kingdom
- Branch: British Army
- Service years: 1841–1893
- Rank: General
- Unit: Royal Artillery
- Conflicts: Crimean War
- Awards: Knight Commander of the Order of St Michael and St George

General Sir Henry Augustus Smyth KCMG FSA FRGS (25 November 1825 – 19 September 1906) was a senior British Army officer. He was the son of Admiral William Henry Smyth and the brother of astronomer Charles Piazzi Smyth and geologist Sir Warington Wilkinson Smyth. Of his sisters, Henrietta married the theologian Baden Powell and Georgiana married the anatomist Sir William Henry Flower.

== Military career ==
Born on 25 November 1825 in Westminster and educated at Bedford School, Smyth was commissioned as second lieutenant in the Royal Artillery in 1843. He served in the Crimean War and was present at the Siege of Sevastopol. He became commandant of Woolwich garrison and military district in 1882 and General Officer Commanding the troops in South Africa in 1886. In 1888 Smyth mustered an army of 2,000 troops and left for Zululand to put down a rebellion there.

Smyth became acting Governor of Cape Colony as well as acting High Commissioner for Southern Africa in 1889. He became Governor of Malta in 1890, and, as his A.D.C., took with him from South Africa his elder sister's 32-year-old son Robert Baden-Powell. Smyth retired in 1893 aged 68.

== Family ==
On 14 April 1874 at Lillington, Warwickshire, he married Helen Constance Greaves (1845–1932), daughter of John Whitehead Greaves and sister of John Ernest Greaves. They had no children. Smyth died on 18 September 1906 at Stone, Buckinghamshire, and was buried there.

== Notes ==
Government offices
Preceded by The Hon. Hercules Robinson	Acting Governor of Cape Colony; Acting High Commissioner for Southern Africa; 1889	Succeeded by Henry Loch
Preceded by Sir Henry Torrens	Governor of Malta; 1890–1893	Succeeded by Sir Arthur Lyon Fremantle
