= John Blair (surgeon) =

Scottish surgeon (1928–2023)

John Blair OBE TD
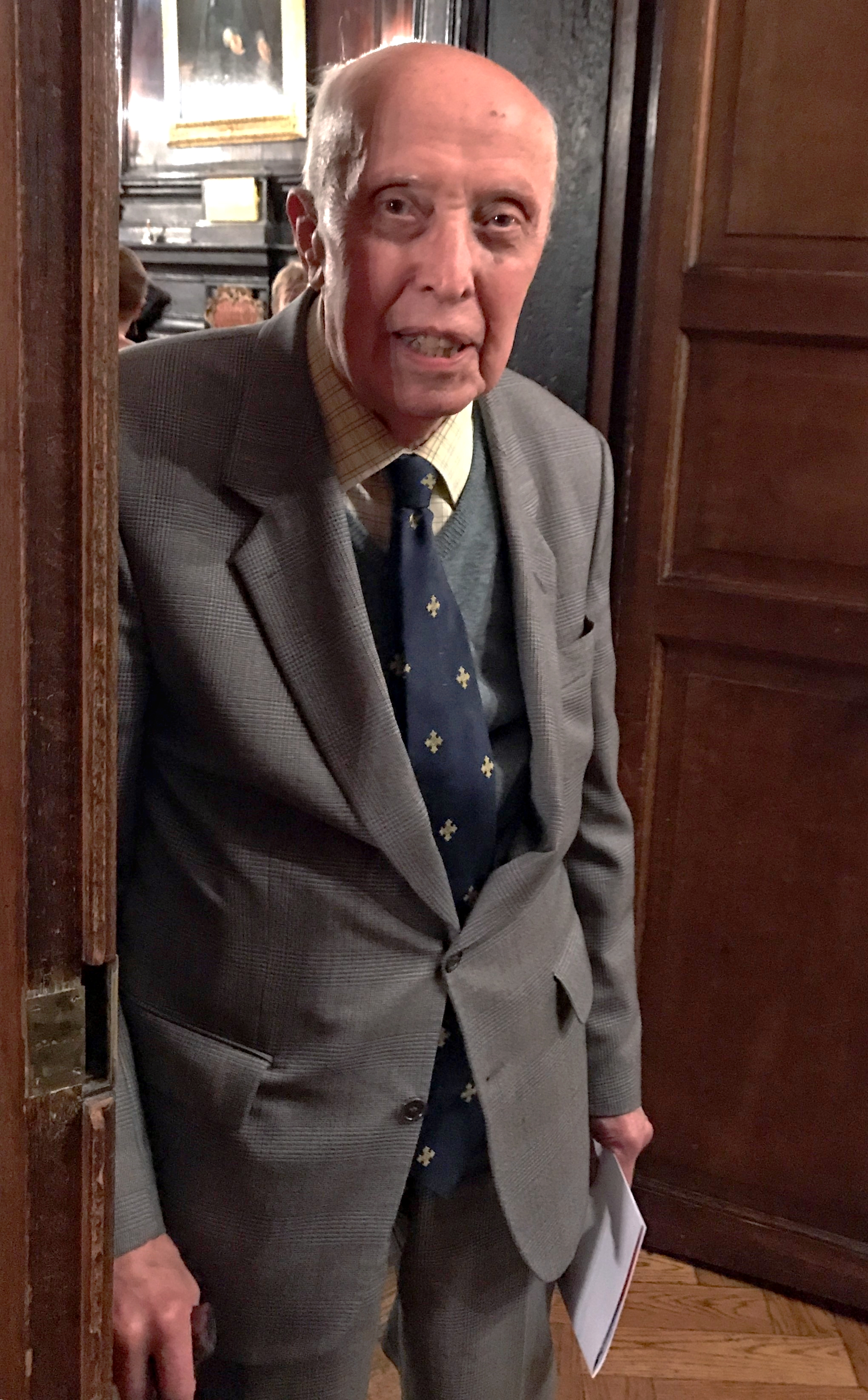
- John Blair at the Worshipful Society of Apothecaries (2018)
- Born: 31 December 1928; Wormit, Scotland
- Died: 12 June 2023 (aged 94); Perth Royal Infirmary
- Education: High School of Dundee; University of St Andrews
- Occupation: Surgeon
- Known for: President of the Scottish Society of the History of Medicine, British Society for the History of Medicine, Royal Perth Golfing Society
- Medical career
- Profession: Medicine

John Samuel Greene Blair (31 December 1928 — 12 June 2023) was a Scottish surgeon, chiefly at Perth Royal Infirmary.

For his service in the Territorial Army, Blair was made OBE (military). He was a former president of the Scottish Society of the History of Medicine (SSHM), and then the British Society for the History of Medicine (BSHM). He was captain of the Royal Perth Golfing Society. The John Blair Trust is named after him.

== Early life and education ==
John Blair was born on Hogmanay on 31 December 1928, in Wormit, Scotland. He was one of three children of George Blair, clerk to the income tax commissioner, and his wife, an Irish/Argentinian. He was educated at the High School of Dundee, where in 1946 he was dux. A shortage of gold at the time meant that the gold medal associated with that honour was not presented in 1946. He was a Harkness Scholar at the University of St Andrews, from where he graduated MB, ChB in 1951. Between 1952 and 1955 he served as a National Service Officer in the Royal Army Medical Corps (RAMC). Having studied history as an external student at London University, he was awarded the degree of Bachelor of Arts in 1955. His thesis for the degree of ChM at the University of St Andrews in 1961 on 'slipperiness of fat' received a high commendation.

== Career ==
From 1965 to 1990, Blair was consultant surgeon at Perth Royal Infirmary. From 1964 to 1992, he was an examiner in anatomy at the Royal College of Surgeons of Edinburgh.

For several years he served in the Territorial Army, commanding the St Andrews (later Tayforth) Officer Training Corps and then 225 Field Ambulance in Dundee. As a reservist officer until 1992, Blair held posts in Cyprus, Hong Kong, Musgrove Park, and Nepal, He was awarded the Territorial Decoration (TD) for this military service.

== Retirement ==
Blair retired from the NHS in 1991 and took up an appointment as honorary senior clinical teacher at the Faculty of Medicine, University of Dundee. He was the 17th president of the Scottish Society of the History of Medicine (SSHM) from 1990 to 1993, and was then elected president of the British Society for the History of Medicine (BSHM) from 1993 to 1995. He was appointed world vice-president of the International Society for the History of Medicine. Blair was a Knight of St John and served as the Hospitaller of the Scottish Priory of the Order of St John. He was also captain of the Royal Perth Golfing Society.

== Honours and awards ==
In 1974, Blair was made OBE (military) for services to the Territorial Army. He was awarded the honorary degree of DLitt from St Andrews University in 1991. In recognition of his many contributions as a serving officer and historian to the Royal Army Medical Corps, he was elected Life President of the Friends of Millbank. A former top student at the High School of Dundee, Blair was presented with his gold medal 60 years later in 2006 (there having been a shortage of gold in 1946), making him the only one of Dundee's top students to receive the medal in the presence of his wife and one child.

== The John Blair Trust ==
The John Blair Trust, founded in 1995, is named in Blair's honour. Blair had been president of both the SSHM and the BSHM. He had played a major role in organising their meetings, the success of which led to the formation of the Trust. The aim of the Trust is to promote "the study of the history of medicine by undergraduate students of medicine and allied sciences".

== Personal life and death ==
In 1953 Blair married Ailsa Jean Bowes MBE, and they had two sons and one daughter. Blair died at Perth Royal Infirmary on 12 June 2023.

== Selected publications ==
=== Thesis ===
- Slipperiness of Human Fat. University of St Andrews. 1961. (Thesis)

=== Articles ===
- Blair, John S. G. (June 1963). "George Ridpath, Minister of Stitchel". Scottish Medical Journal. 8 (6): 243–247. doi:10.1177/003693306300800605. ISSN 0036-9330. PMID 13971452.

=== Books ===
- History of Medicine in the University of St. Andrews. Scottish Academic Press. 1987. ISBN 978-0-7073-0525-7.
- Ten Tayside Doctors. Edinburgh: Edinburgh Scottish Academic Press. 1990. ISBN 0-7073-0600-0.
- The Centenary History of the Royal Army Medical Corps (1898- 1998). Edinburgh: Scottish Academic Press. 1997.
- How They Broke Baxter: The Manager's Move In. Cirencester: Memoirs Publishing. 2013. ISBN 978-1-86151-084-6.
