= Henry Torrens (British Army officer, born 1833) =

British Army general

Lieutenant-General Sir Henry Torrens KCB KCMG
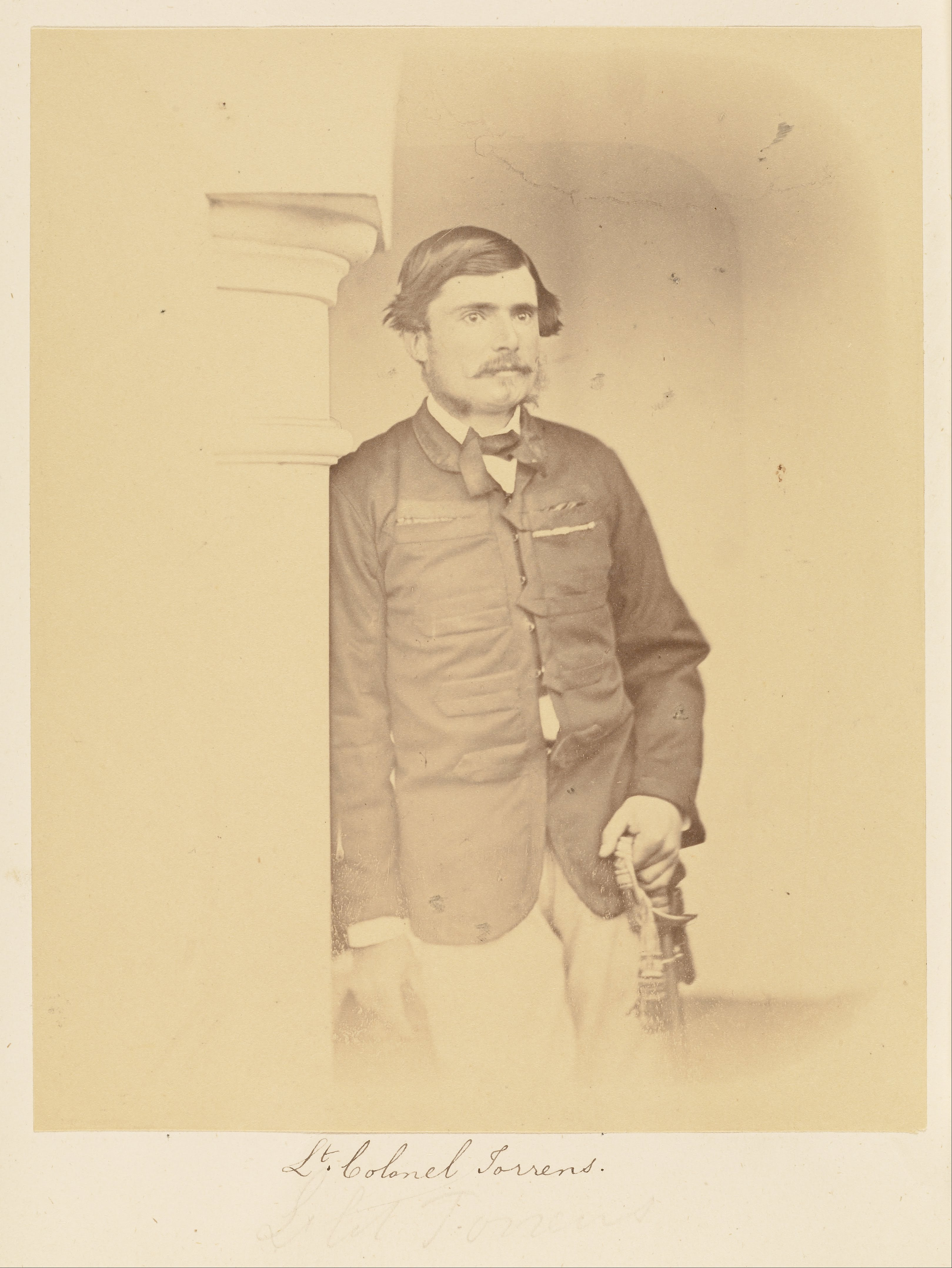
- Photograph by Felice Beato, 1858–1859
- Born: 24 February 1833
- Died: 1 December 1889 (aged 56)
- Military career
- Allegiance: United Kingdom
- Branch: British Army
- Service years: 1849 - 1889
- Rank: Lieutenant-General
- Conflicts: Crimean War; Indian Mutiny
- Awards: Knight Commander of the Order of the Bath; Knight Commander of St Michael and St George

Lieutenant-General Sir Henry D'Oyley Torrens KCB KCMG (24 February 1833 – 1 December 1889) was a British Army officer and colonial governor. He was born in Meerut, India, the son of Henry Whitelock Torrens and Eliza Mary Roberts and died in London.

== Military career ==
Torrens was commissioned as a second Lieutenant in the Royal Welsh Fusiliers in 1849. His rise through the ranks was very rapid, reaching the rank of colonel in 1864.

He served in the Crimean War at the major battles, for which he was awarded the Légion d'honneur, followed by service in India during the Indian Mutiny in 1857.

In 1862, he published a book, Travels in Ladâk, Tartary, and Kashmir, about his summer holiday the previous year.

He was promoted to Major-General in 1869 and finally to Lieutenant-General while serving as General Officer Commanding Cork District in Ireland in 1884.

He went on to be was Governor of Cape Colony in 1886 and Governor of Malta in 1888. He was a keen golfer founding both Royal Cape Golf Club in 1886 and Royal Malta Golf Club in 1888.

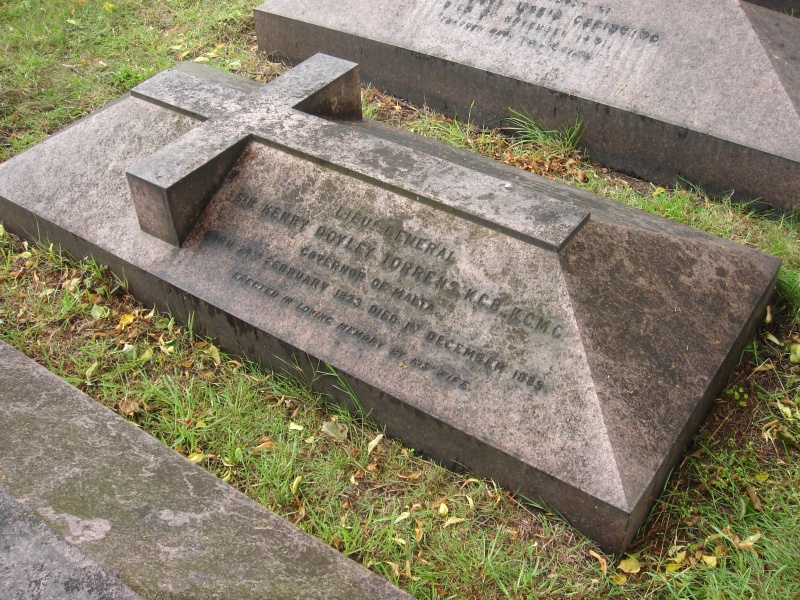
Funerary monument, Brompton Cemetery, London

== Personal life ==
In 1876, Torrens married Georgina Frances De Butts in Kensington, London. She was born in 1852, the daughter of Augustus De Butts Jr (1806–1867) and his wife, Hannah Georgeina Elizabeth Inglefield, and granddaughter of General Sir Augustus De Butts. She died in 1918.

He died on 1 December 1889 and the beneficiary of his will was his wife, Georgina Frances Torrens. He is buried in Brompton Cemetery, London. Georgina died in 1918.

Political offices
Preceded by Sir Leicester Smyth	Governor of Cape Colony; 1886–1888	Succeeded by Sir Henry Smyth
Preceded by Sir Lintorn Simmons	Governor of Malta; 1888–1889	Succeeded by Sir Henry Smyth
