= Cambridge University Golf Club =

Golf club in Cambridge, England

Coordinates: 52.3312°N 0.4917°E

- Sport: Golf
- Founded: 1869
- Location: Royal Worlington and Newmarket Golf Club
- President: Tim Harvey-Samuel
- Secretary: Ben Collier
- Captain: Ben Chumas
- Website: www.cugc.uk

The Cambridge University Golf Club is the golf club for the University of Cambridge, England. It comprises the Blues team, the second-team Cambridge University Golf Club Stymies, and the Ladies team. The club was founded in 1869, and the first University Golf Match was played against Oxford in 1878. Members who play in the University Golf Match are awarded a Full Blue, while those who play against Oxford for the Stymies are awarded Second Team Colours.

== History ==
Golf at the University of Cambridge can be traced back to 1869, when a group of undergraduates played golf over the heath in neighbouring Royston, initially cutting the holes themselves. This embryo club boasted 17 members, who paid a subscription fee of two shillings and sixpence. However, given its distance from Cambridge (8 miles), the Royston-based club did not survive beyond 1871.

The CUGC was officially founded in 1875 by W.T. Linskill (Jesus), and played at Coldham's Common (in the general area of the present airport) until the club's current home club, Royal Worlington and Newmarket Golf Club, was opened in 1893.

== Present-day Club ==
The CUGC comprises the Blues, the Stymies, and the Ladies golf teams; each has its own fixture list and Varsity Match against their Oxford counterparts. The golf season runs from the beginning of Michaelmas Term (early October), and ends with the Varsity Matches at the end of Lent Term (late March).

The CUGC is governed by a permanent President and Senior Treasurer, as well as the Captain, Hon. Secretary, Treasurer, Stymies Captain, and Ladies Captain that are elected each year.

Royal Worlington has been the home of the CUGC for over 100 years; home matches are held at the club, as well as training and coaching.

== Notable members ==
- Harry Colt, captain in 1890
- Bernard Darwin, captain in 1897
- Henry Longhurst, captain in 1931
- John Stanton Fleming Morrison
- William Whitelaw
- Max Woosnam
- Donald Steel
- Ted Dexter
- George VI
