= Scottish Society of the History of Medicine =

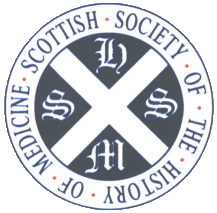
- Abbreviation: SSHM
- Formation: 23 April 1948; 78 years ago
- Founder: Douglas Guthrie
- Legal status: Charity registered in Scotland
- President: Malcolm Kinnear
- Affiliations: British Society for the History of Medicine
- Website: SSHM web page

The Scottish Society of the History of Medicine (SSHM) was founded in 1948. Its aims are "to promote, encourage and support the study of the history of medicine", with a particular interest in Scottish Medicine. Founded at a time when the study of history of medicine was dominated by medical doctors, the society aimed, from the start, to have a broad based membership, to interest others in the subject. Historians, librarians, scientists, pharmacists and others have all played an active role in its activities, and representatives from these professions have become presidents.

== Origins ==
The SSHM was founded by Douglas Guthrie, an Edinburgh ENT surgeon who became a medical historian. Early in 1948 Guthrie wrote to a number of individuals throughout Scotland inviting them to a meeting to discuss the formation of a Scottish history of medicine society. The meeting was held in the Royal College of Surgeons of Edinburgh on 23 April 1948. Those present agreed with Guthrie’s suggestion that it be called the Scottish Society of the History of Medicine and further agreed to adopt the constitution which he had prepared. Office bearers were appointed with Guthrie elected as the first president.

From the outset the SSHM aimed to be broad based and the initial members included medical doctors, dentists, pharmacists and librarians. Among the first papers heard at the society was one on quarantine from plague and another on the periodic devastation of Scotland by famines and epidemics.

At the end of the first year it was decided that meetings should be held in Edinburgh, Glasgow, Aberdeen and St Andrews. In addition there would be ‘outings to places of interest to medical historians', the first of which, on 18 June 1949, was to Lanark and Hamilton places associated with William Smellie and William Cullen. This was followed by a visit to the Hunter House Museum at Long Calderwood, birthplace of the brothers John and William Hunter. Subsequent outings included visits to Torphichen Preceptory (1950), Greyfriars Churchyard (1954), Liddesdale Heritage Centre, Newcastleton. (1955), the John Leyden Memorial at Denholm (1964) and the David Livingstone Centre, Blantyre (1973).

By the end of the second year the membership had exceeded 100 and by 1978 exceeded 150.

In 1957, the society co-founded the journal Medical History. In 1965 it was one of four founder societies of the British Society for the History of Medicine, to which it remains affiliated.

== Activities ==
The Society holds an autumn meeting in Edinburgh, a spring meeting in Glasgow and a summer meeting at a chosen venue elsewhere in Scotland. In addition an annual lecture and dinner in honour of Haldane Tait. a former President and long-serving Secretary to the Society, is held in the summer, usually in Edinburgh.

Since the inaugural meeting in 1948, papers given to the society have been published as the Report of Proceedings of the Scottish Society of the History of Medicine. These are now freely available online.

The Society has been registered as a charity in Scotland (SC008621) since 1973.

The Society's archives (1949–1995) are held at University of St Andrews Special Collections (Reference GB 227 msdep87) and the archives of the Douglas Guthrie Trust are held at the archive of the Royal College of Surgeons of Edinburgh.

The Society has a website www.sshm.ac.uk and a Facebook page.

== Douglas Guthrie Trust ==
Established as a result of a bequest from Douglas Guthrie, the Trust is administered by the SSHM whose officers act as trustees. It offers funding to support research into history of medicine and is registered (SC000531) as a charity in Scotland.

== See also ==
- List of presidents of the Scottish Society of the History of Medicine
