= Douglas Guthrie =

Scottish doctor & historian (1885–1975)

Douglas Guthrie FRSE FRCS FRCP
- Born: Douglas James Guthrie; 8 September 1885; Dysart, Fife
- Died: 8 June 1975 (aged 89); Edinburgh
- Education: Kirkcaldy High School; Royal High School, Edinburgh; Edinburgh University
- Occupations: Surgeon, historian
- Known for: Speech disorders, history of medicine
- Spouses: Helen Purdie; Margaret Jean Guthrie
- Parent: Reverend William Guthrie

Douglas James Guthrie FRSE FRCS FRCP FRCSEd FRCPE (8 September 1885 – 8 June 1975) was a Scottish medical doctor, otolaryngologist and historian of medicine.

After graduating in medicine from Edinburgh University, he pursued postgraduate studies into diseases of ear, nose and throat at leading European clinics.

He served in the Royal Army Medical Corps during the First World War and had a particular interest in disorders of speech in children, ultimately establishing specialised clinics.

In 1936, with no definitive teaching Hospital appointment, he began to research and write what would prove to be his magnum opus A History of Medicine and became lecturer in the history of medicine at Edinburgh.

In 1948 Guthrie brought about the foundation of the Scottish Society of the History of Medicine and served as its first president. Subsequently, he became president of the British Society for the History of Medicine and the History of Medicine Society at the Royal Society of Medicine (RSM).

He died in 1975, his legacy remaining with the Guthrie Trust, which awards grants for research in history of medicine.

== Early life and family ==
Douglas Guthrie was born on 8 September 1885 in Dysart in Fife, the son of Rev William Guthrie, minister of the United Free Church. He was educated at Kirkcaldy High School and the Royal High School, Edinburgh. He then studied medicine at Edinburgh University, graduating MB ChB with honours in 1907. He won the McCosh Graduate's and Medical Bursaries which he used to pursue postgraduate study into diseases of ear, nose and throat at leading European clinics. He studied in Berlin at the clinic of Gustav Brühl (1871–1939), at the Vienna clinics of Ottokar Chiari (1853–1918) and Marcus Hajek (1861–1941) and at Hamburg and Jena. After six months of research at the Pasteur Institute in Paris he worked as a clinical assistant at the Hôpital Saint-Louis in Paris. He then spent six years in general practice in Lanark, during which time he worked on a thesis for the MD degree which was awarded in 1909. He was awarded the FRCSEd diploma in 1913.

He was married twice: firstly to Helen Purdie, and following her death in 1950 he married his cousin Margaret Jean Guthrie in 1953.

== Surgical career ==
In the First World War he served in the Royal Army Medical Corps. After being invalided back from France he served as surgeon and commandant the Royal Flying Corps hospitals in London, that in Eaton Square and its sister Hospital in Bryanston Square. This enabled him to attend the clinics at Kings College Hospital of the leading laryngologist Sir St Clair Thomson. On return to Edinburgh he was appointed Ear, Nose and Throat surgeon to the Royal Hospital for Sick Children and lecturer in the Extramural School of Medicine of the Royal Colleges of Edinburgh. In 1930 he was elected a Fellow of the Royal Society of Edinburgh. His proposers were Thomas James Jehu, James Hartley Ashworth, Ralph Allan Sampson and Sir Edward Albert Sharpey-Schafer. He later served as the Society's Curator from 1949 to 1959.

He had a particular interest in disorders of speech in children and established specialised clinics and the training of speech therapists. With George Seth he wrote Speech in childhood: its development and disorders, which became a standard work on the subject.

As his fixed tenure post at the Children's Hospital was due to end in 1936, he applied, in 1933 for an assistant surgeon post at Edinburgh Royal Infirmary but was not appointed. He continued as surgeon to the Army in Scotland and with a small practice at a small voluntary hospital the Eye, Ear and Throat Infirmary. So in 1936, with no definitive teaching Hospital appointment, he began to research and write what would prove to be his magnum opus A History of Medicine.

== Medical historian ==
When he finally retired from clinical work in 1945, he was appointed as a lecturer in the History of Medicine at Edinburgh University, a post that had been previously held by his friend John Comrie. In the same year A History of Medicine was published to critical acclaim. A favourable review in The Observer by George Bernard Shaw resulted in the book becoming a best seller. Shaw wrote "I am floored by the extraordinary discrepancy between his [Guthrie's] knowledge and my knowledge..." He went on "Dr Guthrie's job of packing it [the history of medicine] into 400 pages is learnedly and readably done...". Shaw's review was syndicated in America boosting international sales and making Guthrie's name well known in the world of medical history. In Edinburgh he gave systematic lectures on medical history to medical undergraduates and also undertook a series of lecture tours to North and South America, to Africa and to Australasia.

At a time when history of medicine was the almost exclusive preserve of medical doctors, Guthrie promoted to them the techniques of the profession historian. He advocated that history of medicine should also be taught by historians in Arts faculties, a policy which began to be introduced in the UK about ten years later. In 1947 Guthrie was elected to the Aesculapian Club of Edinburgh.

== Medical history societies ==
In 1948 Guthrie brought about the foundation of the Scottish Society of the History of Medicine and served as its first president. In 1956 he was elected president of the History of Medicine Society of the Royal Society of Medicine (RSM). He stated in his presidential address at the RSM in 1957 "...it is obvious that history supplies an essential basis of medicine. It gives us ideals to follow, inspirations for our work and hope for the future". In 1965 he was involved in the founding of the British Society for the History of Medicine and was also its first President

== Honours ==
Guthrie served for 19 years as honorary librarian to the RCSEd and as librarian (curator) to the Royal Society of Edinburgh of which he also became vice-president from 1959 to 1962. In 1956 he was elected president of the Harveian Society of Edinburgh and donated the president's medal to the society. He was also elected president of the Royal Physical Society of Edinburgh, president of the Old Edinburgh Club and vice president of the Royal Scottish Geographical Society.

He received honorary membership or fellowship from many ENT and historical societies in Europe and North and South America. The two honours which he declared that he most valued were the Doctorate of Letters from the University of Edinburgh and the honorary Fellowship of the Royal Society of Medicine, both awarded in 1967.

== Death and legacy ==
Guthrie died in Edinburgh on 8 June 1975.

The Douglas Guthrie Trust, which is administered by the Scottish Society of the History of Medicine, awards grants for research in history of medicine. The Douglas Guthrie Lecture, established in 1965, is administered by the two Edinburgh Medical Royal Colleges and is delivered biennially. The Scottish Otolaryngological Society Guthrie Fund, administered by ENT Scotland, gives small grants to ENT consultants and trainees to enhance ENT training and education in Scotland.

== Selected publications ==
- Diseases of the Ear, Nose & Throat in Childhood. London: A. & C. Black, Ltd, 1921.
- Some Disorders of Speech in Childhood: Their Nature and Treatment. Edinburgh: Oliver & Boyd, 1933. (With Elsa Davidson)
- Speech in Childhood; Its Development and Disorders. London: Oxford Univ. Press, 1935. (With George Seth)

=== 1940s ===
- Early Text-Books of Otology. London: Headley Brothers, 1940.
- John Hunter: Surgeon and Naturalist. Edinburgh: Oliver & Boyd, 1942.
- Religio medici: A Tercentenary Tribute. London: Lancet Office, 1943.
- Medicine: Art or Science? London: Samuel Temple, 1947.
- Lord Lister, His Life and Doctrine. Edinburgh: Livingstone, 1949.

=== 1950s ===
- Some Early Herbals and Pharmacopoeias. Edinburgh: Edinburgh University, 1950.
- Observations on Primitive Medicine, with Special Reference to Native African Medicine. London: Royal Society of Medicine, 1951.
- History of the Royal Medical Society, 1737–1937. Edinburgh: Edinburgh University Press, 1952. (With James Gray)
- From Witchcraft to Antisepsis, a Study in Antithesis. Lawrence: University of Kansas Press, 1955.
- Medical and Literary Contributions to the Transactions of the Royal Society of Edinburgh: 1783–1900. Edinburgh: Royal Society of Edinburgh, 1958.

=== 1960s ===
- The Royal Edinburgh Hospital for Sick Children 1860–1960. Edinburgh: Livingstone, 1960.
- Scottish Influence on the Evolution of British Medicine. London: Pitman Medical Pub. Co, 1960.
- A History of Medicine: 2nd Edition. Edinburgh: T. Nelson and Sons, 1960.
- Plants As Remedies: The Debt of Medicine to Botany. Edinburgh: Botanical Society of Edinburgh, 1961.
- A Short History of the Royal Society Club of Edinburgh 1820 to 1962. Edinburgh: Royal Society Club, 1962.
- Janus in the Doorway. London:. Pitman Medical Pub. Co.,1963.
- The Medical School of Edinburgh. Edinburgh: University of Edinburgh, 1964.
- Extramural Medical Education in Edinburgh, and the School of Medicine of the Royal Colleges. Edinburgh: E. & S. Livingstone, 1965.
- The Aesculapian Club of Edinburgh. Edinburgh: University of Edinburgh, 1968.
