= Royal Perth Golfing Society =

Coordinates: 56.404°N 3.432°W

The Royal Perth Golfing Society & County and City Club
- Interactive map of The Royal Perth Golfing Society & County and City Club

Club information
- Location: Perth, Scotland
- Established: 1824
- Website: www.rpgsociety.co.uk

The Royal Perth Golfing Society, or its full name of The Royal Perth Golfing Society & County and City Club, is a golfing and private members club in Perth, Scotland, with premises overlooking the North Inch.

== History ==
The Perth Golfing Society was formed in 1824.

In 1833 King William IV granted the Society his Royal Patronage. This was the very first grant of royal patronage to a Golfing Society, a year before The Royal and Ancient Golf Club of St Andrews. There are now over 70 clubs throughout the world entitled to use the name 'Royal'.

== See also ==
- List of golf clubs granted Royal status
