= E. A. Underwood =

Scottish physician (1899–1980)

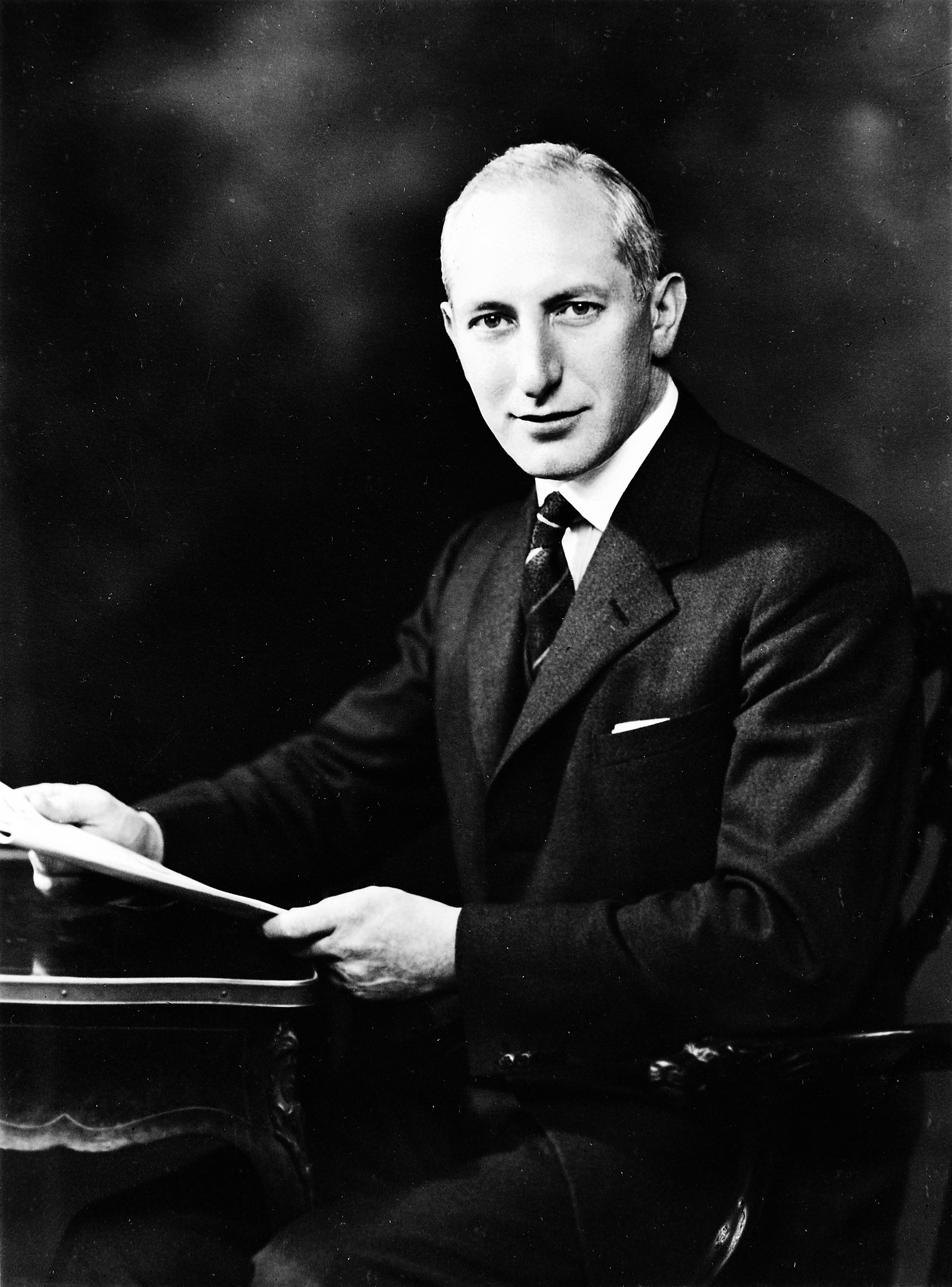
- Born: Edgar Ashworth Underwood; 9 March 1899; Dumfries, Scotland
- Died: 6 March 1980 (aged 80); Walton-on-Thames, England
- Education: Dumfries Academy; University of Glasgow
- Occupation: Physician
- Known for: Public health; History of medicine
- Relatives: Charles Singer
- Medical career
- Institutions: University College London; Wellcome Institute for the History of Medicine
- Notable works: A Manual of Tuberculosis (1931); A Short History of Medicine (revised edition 1962)

Edgar Ashworth Underwood (9 March 1899 – 6 March 1980) was a Scottish physician who began his career in public health and later became director of the Wellcome Institute for the History of Medicine.

Between 1917 and 1919 Underwood served in the Cameron Highlanders. During his early medical training he served as vice-president of the Glasgow Medico-Chirurgical Society and won the Cullen Medal for materia medica and the Hunter medals for midwifery and clinical surgery. In 1929 he was appointed deputy medical officer of health (MOH) in Rotherham and then medical superintendent of Oakwood Sanatorium, 1929–1931. Later he became deputy MOH in Leeds, and then MOH in Shoreditch and in West Ham. His early publications focused on tuberculosis and epidemiology, including the textbook A Manual of Tuberculosis (1931), while simultaneously publishing on history of medicine. He also contributed to the Encyclopædia Britannica.

Underwood published history of medicine–related articles regularly in the Royal Society of Medicine Proceedings, and became president of the History of Medicine Society of the Royal Society of Medicine, London, from 1948 to 1950.

== Early life and family ==
Edgar Underwood was born in Dumfries, Scotland, on 9 March 1899 to David Underwood, a bus driver, and his wife Janet Grierson. He was schooled at Dumfries Academy, where he became dux (head boy).

In 1949 he married Nancy Waley Singer, daughter of the historian of science and medicine, Charles Singer.

== Career ==
During the First World War Underwood served in the Cameron Highlanders between 1917 and 1919.

He began his medical training at the University of Glasgow and obtained a BSc in pure science as well as his MB and Ch.B (Commended). Faced with two final examinations at the same time, he spent half his time on each and passed both. While there he served as vice-president of the Glasgow Medico-Chirurgical Society and won the Cullen Medal for materia medica and the Hunter medals for midwifery and clinical surgery. His mentor was Regius Professor of Surgery, William Macewen.

Underwood worked as resident physician at the Western Infirmary, Glasgow, and in 1926 earned a diploma in public health. He was assistant MOH in Glasgow and Lanark, and from 1929 had positions as deputy MOH in Rotherham and medical superintendent of Oakwood Sanatorium, 1929–1931. Subsequently he was appointed deputy MOH in Leeds and lecturer in public health at the University of Leeds from 1932 to 1934. His early publications focused on tuberculosis and epidemiology, including the textbook A Manual of Tuberculosis (1931), which had three editions. He also wrote the 460-page Annual Report on the Health Services for the Year 1937, in the County Borough of West Ham, while simultaneously publishing on history of medicine including his take on the 1832 pamphlet Cholera Morbus, Precautions, Preventives, and Remedies.

In 1936 he received his MD with high commendation. He was MOH in Shoreditch, 1934–1937, and MOH and chief school medical officer in West Ham from 1937 to 1945. In 1946 he delivered the Royal College of Surgeons' Vicary Lecture. This was followed by the American Association for the History of Medicine's Garrison Lecture in 1947, and the RCP's Fitzpatrick Lecture 1971–1972. Underwood was also a founding member of the British Society for the History of Science and President of the Society from 1957 to 1962.

== History of medicine specialism ==
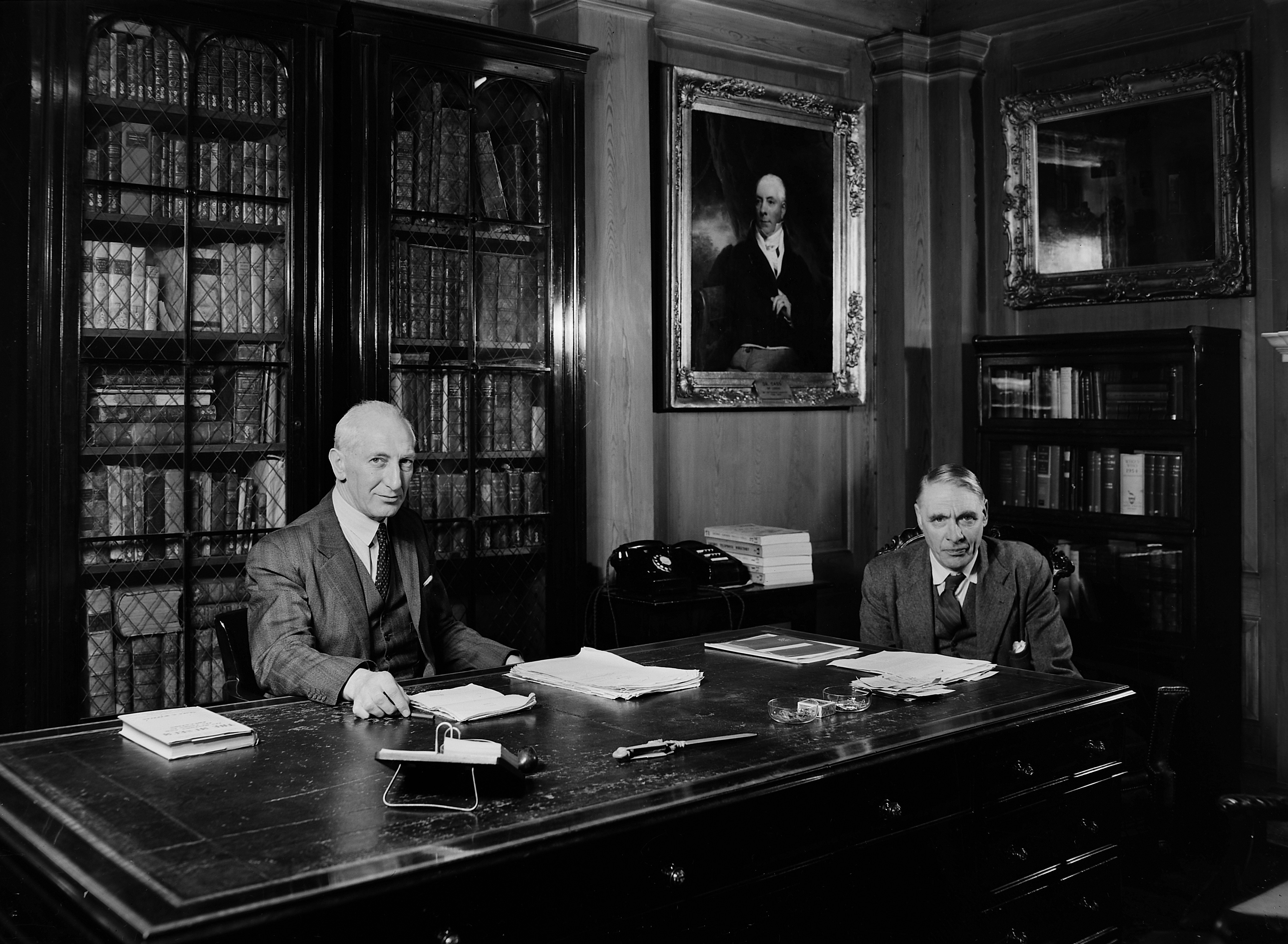
Underwood and A. D. Lacaille in the Director's Room at The Wellcome Historical Medical Museum

Underwood was interested in the history of medicine from early in his career. He joined the History of Medicine Section (later Society) of the Royal Society of Medicine in the 1930s and became its honorary secretary before taking over as its president for a two-year tenure from 1948. Between 1935 and 1962 he published history of medicine–related articles regularly in the Royal Society of Medicine Proceedings. He lectured in medical history at University College, London, and in 1946 he became director of the Wellcome Institute for the History of Medicine, in which capacity he served until 1964.

In 1962, he published a revised edition of Charles Singer's A Short History of Medicine. He contributed to the Encyclopædia Britannica. His Life of Edward Jenner was never published.

== Recognition ==
In 1965, Underwood became a fellow of the Royal College of Physicians, and in 1970 he received an honorary DLitt from the University of Glasgow.

== Death and legacy ==
Underwood died at his home in Walton-on-Thames, Surrey, on 6 March 1980. He received obituaries in the British Medical Journal, Medical History, and in The Times who characterised him as "one of the last of a fast-dying race – the canny Scot".

== Selected publications ==
=== Articles ===
- UNDERWOOD EA (March 1948). "The history of cholera in Great Britain". Proceedings of the Royal Society of Medicine. 41 (3): 165–73. doi:10.1177/003591574804100309. PMC 2184374. PMID 18905493.
- UNDERWOOD EA (1947). "Apollo and Terpsichore; music and the healing art with special reference to B. M. Berenclow, F. N. Marquet and F. K. Harford". Bulletin of the History of Medicine. 21 (5): 639–673. ISSN 0007-5140. PMID 18901360.

=== Books ===
- A Manual of Tuberculosis for Nurses. E. & S. Livingstone, Edinburgh, 1931. (2nd 1938, 3rd 1945) (Introduction by J. R. Currie)
- Annual Report on the Health Services for the Year 1937, in the County Borough of West Ham
- A Short History of Medicine. 2nd edition. Clarendon Press, Oxford, 1962. (With Charles Singer)
- Boerhaave's Men at Leyden and After. Edinburgh University Press, Edinburgh, 1977. ISBN 085224312X
- Edward Jenner: The man and his work. The Jenner Trust, c. 1985.
