= Sam Grey (disambiguation) =

Sam Grey is a British actress.

Sam Grey may also refer to:

- Sam Grey (All My Children), a fictional character in the U.S. TV soap opera All My Children
- Sam Grey, a fictional character of the 1939 film, Star Reporter, portrayed by Eddie Kane

== See also ==
- Samuel Gray (disambiguation)
- Sam Gray (disambiguation)
