= John Rolleston =

John Rolleston is the name of:

- John Davy Rolleston (1873–1946), English physician and folklorist
- John Rolleston (British politician) (1848–1919)
- John Rolleston (New Zealand politician) (1877–1956)
