= Fitzpatrick Lecture =

Annual lecture at the Royal College of Physicians

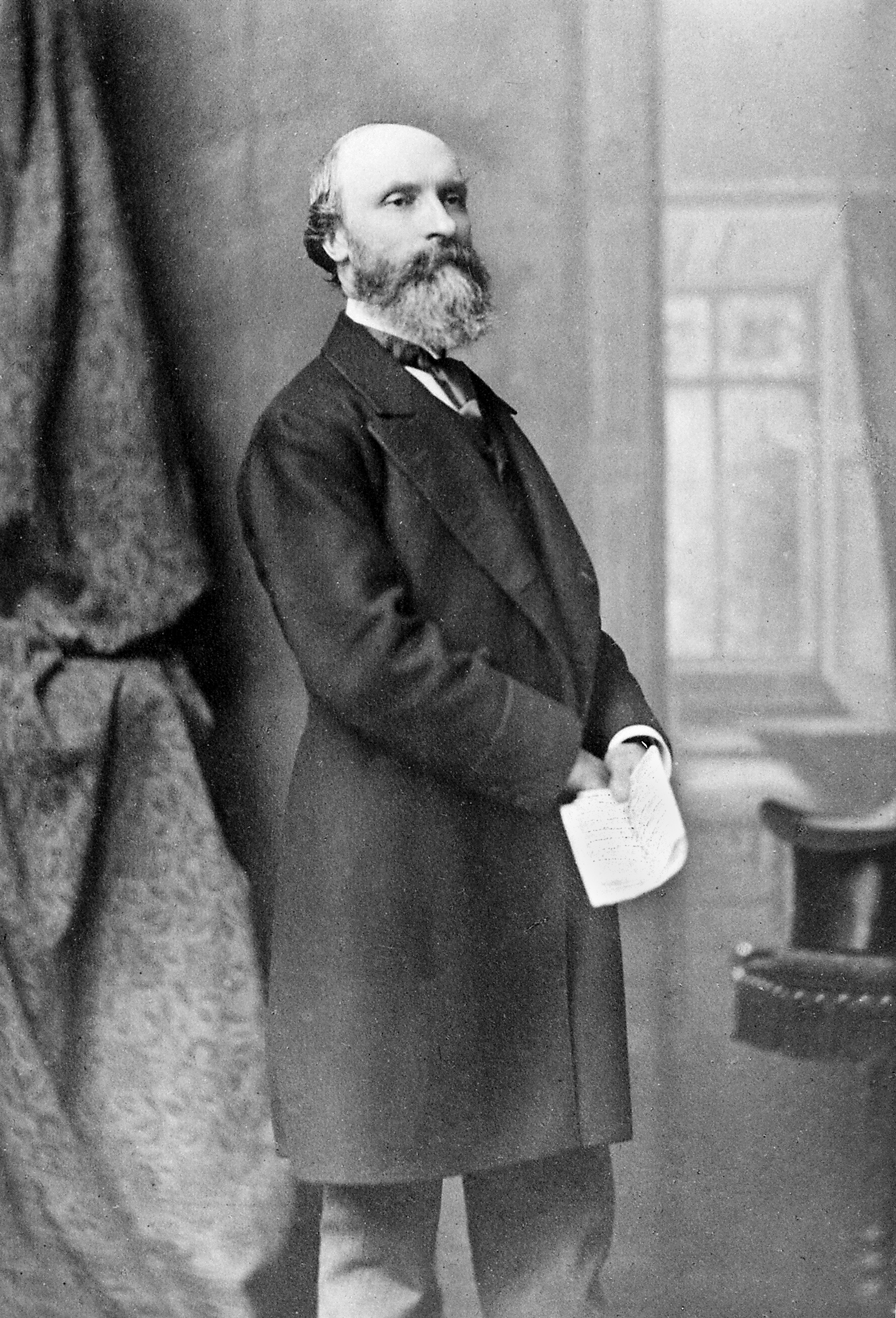
- Founder: Thomas Fitzpatrick (London physician)
- Established: 1901
- Faculty: Royal College of Physicians

The Fitzpatrick Lecture is given annually at the Royal College of Physicians on a subject related to history of medicine. The lecturer, who must be a fellow of the college, is selected by the president and may be chosen to speak for two years successively. The lectures are supported by funds from the Fitzpatrick Trust which was established in 1901 by Agnes Letitia Fitzpatrick with a £2,000 donation in memory of her physician husband Thomas Fitzpatrick. Agnes was influenced by her husband's close friend, Sir Norman Moore, who persuaded her to choose history of medicine as a subject. Subsequently, Moore was credited with its idea and implementation.

The first two Fitzpatrick lectures were given by Joseph Frank Payne, whose request instigated history of medicine lectures at the Royal Society of Medicine and with whose support Sir William Osler established the History of Medicine Section. He was succeeded by Sir Norman Moore, Leonard Guthrie and Clifford Allbutt and Raymond Crawfurd.

== Lecturers ==
=== 1903-1920 ===
| Years | Name | Lecture title | Comments | Image |
|---|---|---|---|---|
| 1903-1904 | Joseph Frank Payne | The Medicine of Anglo-Saxon Times | Paid tribute to Thomas Fitzpatrick prior to first lecture, stating that Norman Moore, an intimate friend of Fitzpatrick, should have given the first lecture. | Joseph Frank Payne |
| 1905-1906 | Sir Norman Moore | The history of the study of medicine in the British Isles | Moore spoke on Medical Study in London during the Middle Ages and Education of physicians in London in the 17th century. | Sir Norman Moore |
| 1907-1908 | Leonard Guthrie | Contributions to the Study of Precocity in Children; The History of Neurology | After Guthrie's death, his work was privately printed in 1921, by his nephew, Eric G. Millar. | |
| 1909-1910 | Clifford Allbutt | Greek Medicine in Rome | Allbutt dedicated the published lectures to Sir Norman Moore, president of the RCP. | Thomas Clifford Allbutt |
| 1911-1912 | Raymond Crawfurd | The King's Evil; Plague and Pestilence in Art and Literature | Crawfurd further expanded these topics to produce books on the subjects. | |
| 1913 | Charles Arthur Mercier | Astrology in Medicine | | Charles Arthur Mercier |
| 1914 | Charles Arthur Mercier | Leper houses and mediaeval hospitals | | Charles Arthur Mercier |
| 1915-1916 | William Halse Rivers | Medicine, Magic and Religion | | W.H.R.Rivers (Maull) |
| 1917 | Arnold Chaplin | Medicine in England during the reign of George III | | |
| 1918 | Arnold Chaplin | The early history of the Army Medical Service | | |
| 1919-1920 | Edward Granville Browne | Arabian medicine | | Edward-Granville-Browne |

=== 1921-1940 ===
| Years | Name | Lecture title | Comments | Image |
|---|---|---|---|---|
| 1921-1922 | Robert Oswald Moon | The Post-Hippocratic Schools of Medicine; Hippocrates and his Successors in Relation to the Philosophy of their Times | Lectured on Hippocrates and his successors and interested in classics. He also wrote book on The Relation of Medicine to Philosophy. | |
| 1923-1924 | Charles Singer | History of Medicine; The Evolution of Anatomy: a Short History of Anatomical and Physiological Discovery to Harvey | | Charles Singer |
| 1925-1926 | Arthur Shadwell | Medicine in Ancient Egypt, Assyria, and Palestine | | |
| 1927 | Herbert R. Spencer | The History of British Midwifery (1650-1800) | | Herbert R. Spencer |
| 1928-1929 | George Frederic Still | The history of paediatrics | | George Frederic Still |
| 1930 | No lecture | | | |
| 1931-1932 | James Stansfield Collier | The development of neurology from the commencement of the nineteenth century to the present time | Collier died in 1935 before his lecture material could be published. Manuscript is now lost. | |
| 1933-1934 | Humphry Davy Rolleston | History of the endocrine organs | | Humphry Davy Rolleston |
| 1935-1936 | John Davy Rolleston | The history of the acute exanthemata | Demonstrated how current medical problems could be understood through studying the past. | |
| 1937-1938 | Henry Harold Scott | A History of Tropical Medicine | | |
| 1939 | Thomas Archibald Malloch | Medical interchange between the British Isles and America before 1801 | Lecture not delivered due to World War II and personal illness. Published by the Royal College of Physicians in 1946. | |
| 1940 | Major Greenwood | Medical Statistics from Graunt to Farr | Lecture not delivered due to World War II. Greenwood retains status as nominal Lecturer from 1941 to 1943. The lecture was later published in 1948. | Major Greenwood |

=== 1941-1960 ===
| Years | Name | Lecture title | Comments | Image |
|---|---|---|---|---|
| 1941-1942 | John Alexander Nixon | | Lecture not delivered due to World War II. | |
| 1943 | Major Greenwood | Medical Statistics from Graunt to Farr | Greenwood talked about 18th century English medical statistics. Later produced three papers and one book on the subject. | Major Greenwood |
| 1944-1945 | Reginald Cecil Bligh Wall | The London Apothecaries: their Society and their Hall | Postponed | |
| 1946-1947 | Arthur S. MacNalty | The History of State Medicine in England | | |
| 1948-1949 | William H. Wynn | The Pestilences of War | | |
| 1950-1951 | William Brockbank | The History of Some Therapeutic Procedures | | |
| 1952-1953 | Maurice Davidson | Medicine in Oxford, a Historical Romance | Davidson also authored a book on the history of the Royal Society of Medicine to cover the years 1905 to 1955. | Maurice Davidson |
| 1954-1955 | C. E. Newman | The Evolution of Medical Education in the Nineteenth Century | Newman described the development of professional solidarity and societies of physicians and apothecaries, demonstrating similarities between apothecaries and attorneys. | |
| 1956-1957 | C. F. T. East | Some Aspects of the History of Cardiology | | |
| 1958-1959 | W. S. C. Copeman | Medical Practice in the Tudor Period | | Portrait of William Copeman Wellcome L0015922 |
| 1960 | K. D. Keele | Evolution of Clinical Methods in Medicine | Published in a book reviewed by Lloyd G. Stevenson. | |

=== 1961-1980 ===
| Years | Name | Lecture title | Comments | Image |
|---|---|---|---|---|
| 1961 | K. D. Keele | Evolution of Clinical Methods in Medicine | | |
| 1962-1963 | A. H. T. Robb-Smith | The Oxford Medical School and its Graduates | | |
| 1964-1965 | R. R. Trail | The History of Popular Medicine in England: up to the 17th century | | |
| 1966 | Geoffrey L. Keynes | John Woodall, Surgeon, 1556-1643. His place in medical history | | Geoffrey Keynes |
| 1967 | P. E. Thompson Hancock | Thomas Hodgkin, Physician and Philanthropist | | |
| 1968 | C. E. Newman | The History of the College Library | | |
| 1969 | A. N. T. Meneces | The Influence of War on Medicine | | |
| 1970 | A. N. T. Meneces | The Influence of Medicine on War | | |
| 1971 | Edgar Ashworth Underwood | The Evolution of Haematology: The History of the Formed Elements of the Blood | | Edgar Underwood |
| 1972 | Edgar Ashworth Underwood | The Evolution of Haematology: The History of some Diseases of the Blood | | Edgar Underwood |
| 1973 | R. J. G. Morrison | Dr Messenger Monsey, 1693-1788. | | |
| 1975 | W. C. Gibson | A Canadian Trio of Internationalists – Banting, Bethune and Chisholm. | | |
| 1976 | Gweneth Whitteridge | Some Italian precursors of the Royal College of Physicians | | |
| 1977 | Edwin S. Clarke | The Neutral Circulation: the role of analogy in medicine | | Edwin S. Clarke |
| 1979 | Christopher Booth | Clinical Science in the age of Reason | | |
| 1980 | A. John Robertson | Dinner with Laennec | A. J. Robertson was the second medical editor of journal Thorax. His Fitzpatrick lecture was based on Läennec, and the physicians who contributed to the confusion about rales and rhonchi. | |

=== 1981-2000 ===
| Years | Name | Lecture title | Comments | Image |
|---|---|---|---|---|
| 1981 | P. A. J. Ball | Plants, their predators and the physician | | |
| 1982 | Arthur Hollman | Thomas Lewis - Physiologist, Cardiologist and Clinical Scientist | | |
| 1983 | Robert Manoah Kark | Richard Bright MD FRS DCL (1789-1859). | | |
| 1984 | Gordon Wolstenholme | Governments may damage your health | | |
| 1986 | John Malins | Provincial physicians in England 1700-1900 | | |
| 1987 | Alex Sakula | A history of asthma | | |
| 1988 | Abraham Goldberg | Towards European medicine: an historical perspective | | |
| 1989 | P. Richards | Leprosy: myth, melodrama and mediaevalism | | |
| 1993 | A. Stuart Mason | Hans Sloane and his friends | | |
| 1994 | J. H. Baron | Art in hospitals | Given whilst Baron was an RCP councillor. | |
| 1995 | David A. Pyke | The great insanity: Hitler and the destruction of German science | | |
| 1996 | Robert Tattersall | Frederick Pavy (1829–1911) - the last of the physician chemists | | |

=== 2001 onwards ===
| Years | Name | Lecture title | Comments | Image |
|---|---|---|---|---|
| 2007 | Jeffrey K Aronson | Clinical pharmacology: a suitable case for treatment | | |
| 2015 | Timothy Peters | King George III and the porphyria myth - causes, consequences and re-evaluation of his mental illness with computer diagnostics | | |
| 2016 | David Eedy | Churchill's medical men | | |
| 2017 | Gareth Williams | Edward Jenner and John Hunter: the apprentice and his sorcerer | | |
| 2018 | Nick Levell | Daniel Turner Vs Thomas Dover - a story of rivals, slaves and pirates, dermatology and physicians | | |
| 2019 | Richard Heron | Good work to attract and retain global capability | | |
| 2020 | Ali Jawad | Sir Harry Sinderson Pasha, royal physician extraordinaire | | |
| 2021 | Andrew J. Lees | Soulful neurology | | Andrew John Lees |
| 2022 | David J. Gawkrodger | Diseases and mortality in the armies of nineteenth century British India | | |
| 2023 | Helen Lachmann | | | |
| 2024 | Anita K. Simonds | | | |

== See also ==
- Bradshaw Lecture
- Goulstonian Lecture
- Harveian Oration
- Hunterian Oration
- Lumleian Lectures
- Milroy Lectures
