= Maurice Davidson =

Maurice Davidson (1883 – 8 November 1967) was a British chest physician and historian of several medical societies. He delivered the Fitzpatrick Lecture from 1952 to 1953 at the Royal College of Physicians. His books include one on the history of the Royal Society of Medicine for the years 1905 to 1955.

== Selected publications ==
- Davidson, Maurice (1955). Royal Society of Medicine : the realization of an ideal (1805-1955). Ipswich: Royal Society of Medicine.
