= Andrew Lees (neurologist) =

UK neurologist (born 1947)

Professor Andrew Lees FRCP FRCPGlas FMedSci
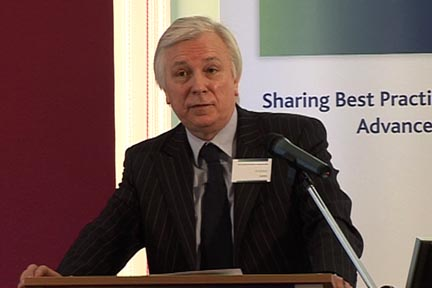
- Lees during a talk in 2010
- Born: Andrew John Lees; 1947 (age 78–79); Merseyside, England
- Known for: Creating the most widely used criteria for the diagnosis of Parkinson's disease
- Medical career
- Profession: Physician
- Sub-specialties: Neurology

Andrew John Lees (born 1947) is an English physician who is Professor of Neurology at the National Hospital for Neurology and Neurosurgery, Queen Square, London and University College London. In 2011 he was named as the world's most highly cited Parkinson's disease researcher.

== Career ==
Lees studied medicine at the Royal London Hospital in Whitechapel where he was awarded the Jonathan Hutchinson Prize for Clinical Medicine, and then trained as a neurologist at the Pitié-Salpêtrière Hospital, Paris, University College Hospital and at the National Hospital for Neurology and Neurosurgery where he was appointed consultant neurologist at the age of 33.

Lees was director of the Reta Lila Weston Institute of Neurological Studies at University College London from 1998 to 2012, an institution dedicated to research into neurodegenerative diseases. In 1987 he co-founded the Queen Square Brain Bank for Neurological Disorders (QSBB), which now houses the largest collection of Parkinson's brains in the world and is where he conducted the research that led to the Queen Square Brain Bank criteria for Parkinson's disease. From 2002 to 2012 he served as director of the Sara Koe PSP Research Centre funded by the PSP Association to conduct research into progressive supranuclear palsy.

He was responsible for the introduction of apomorphine to treat advanced complications of Parkinson's disease including L-dopa induced refractory off periods and dyskinesias.

== Awards and achievements ==
Lees received the American Academy of Neurology Movement Disorders Life Time Achievement Award for his outstanding achievements in the field of Parkinson's disease and other movement disorders (2006). He delivered the Charles Smith Memorial Lecture in Jerusalem in 2000 http://psychobiology.org.il/lecture.php He delivered the Drucker Memorial Lecture, Beth Israel, Deaconess Medical Center, Boston, the Gowers Memorial Lecture at the National Hospital for Neurology and Neurosurgery, Queen Square in 2007, the Ian McDonald Memorial Lecture in Brisbane, Australia 2008, the Lord Brain Memorial Lecture at the Royal London Hospital 2010, and the Melvin Yahr Memorial Lecture Mount Sinai Hospital New York (2010). He was elected a Fellow of the Academy of Medical Sciences in 2009. In 2012, he was awarded the Dingebauer Prize by the German Society of Neurology for his outstanding achievement in the field of Movement Disorders. In 2014 he was the recipient of the Jay Van Andel Award for outstanding research in Parkinson's disease. In 2015 Lees was awarded the Association of British Neurologists Medal, and the British Neuropsychiatry Association Medal in 2020. He received the Bing Spear Award for outstanding contributions towards Saner drug policies in 2016, and has been awarded the Parkinson Canada's Donald Calne Award and Lectureship for 2017. He delivered the 2021 Fitzpatrick Lecture at the Royal College of Physicians with the title, 'Soulful Neurology' and was the recipient of the Institute of Neurology, UCL Prize Lecture Award 2021. In the same year he was appointed the Chester L Stephens Sr. Lecturer at the University of South Florida, Morsani College of Medicine 2021, and in 2023 delivered the 22nd Macdonald Critchley Lecture on 'Silent Language' at Apothecaries' Hall, London.

Other achievements include: Council Member for the Academy of Medical Sciences, United Kingdom, National Institute for Health and Care Research (NIHR) Senior investigator, Co-founder and past President of The Movement Disorder Society, Founding Editor of Behavioural Neurology (1988- 1993), Former Co-Editor-in-Chief of the journal Movement Disorders, UK Government National Institute for Health and Care Excellence Guidleline Development Group for Parkinson's Disease (2016-2019), Visiting Professor to the Hospital Sao Rafaele, Salvador Brazil, Honorary overseas member of the Academia Nacional de Medicina, Brazil. He is one of the top neuroscientists in the world 2024 ranking.

== Publications ==
=== Scientific articles ===
Lees is recognised as a highly cited neuroscientist on the Institute for Scientific Information "ISI Highly Cited Researchers" database with an h-index of 130 and is the world's most highly cited Parkinson's disease researcher with over 23,000 citations since 1985 and co-author of 8 citation classics.

=== Media ===
In addition to his academic career Lees has written a book about the city of Liverpool and the authorized biography of footballer Ray Kennedy. Lees also served as medical advisor to Patient 39 the film adaptation of a William Boyd short story and has written about how both Conan Doyle and William Burroughs have influenced his career as a neurologist.

Lees was a longstanding friend of Oliver Sacks, who also began his neurological training at the Middlesex Hospital, and he was acknowledged in the preface of Sacks books Awakenings, a story about L-dopa treatment of encephalitis lethargica which was made into a film starring Robert De Niro and Robin Williams, and The Island of the Colorblind, which deals with parkinsonism caused by Lytico-bodig disease.

In his memoir 'Mentored by a Madman' and 'Brainspotting' Lees explains how his career was influenced by Arthur Conan Doyle's character Sherlock Holmes and by the self-experimentation of William S. Burroughs, author of Naked Lunch. He is a member of the Society of Authors.

=== Books ===
- Parkinson's Disease. The facts. Oxford University Press. 1982. ISBN 9780192612939.
- Tics and Related Disorders. Churchill Livingstone Edinburgh. 1985. ISBN 9780443026775.
- Lees, Andrew (2011). Ray of Hope. Penguin. ISBN 9780140172614. A biography of Ray Kennedy, the former England football player who developed Parkinson's disease at the age of 35. Michael Joseph and Penguin Books London
- The Hurricane Port. A social History of Liverpool. Random House. 2011. ISBN 9781780571560.
- William Richard Gowers 1845-1915: Exploring the Victorian Brain. Oxford University Press. 2012. ISBN 9780191637025.
- Alzheimer's: The Silent Plague. Penguin E-book. 2012. ISBN 9780670922734.
- Mentored by a Madman: The William Burroughs Experiment. Notting Hill Editions. 2016.
- Brazil That Never Was. Notting Hill Editions and New York Review of Books. 2020. ISBN 9781912559213
- Brainspotting: Adventures in Neurology. Notting Hill Editions. 2022. ISBN 9781912559367

Neurological Birdsong.Mirabeau Press. 2024 @MirabeauPress
(ISBN 978-1735705569)
