= Arthur Shadwell =

British uthor and physician (1854–1936)

- Born: 21 September 1854
- Died: 21 March 1936 (aged 81); Richmond, London

Academic background
- Education: University of Oxford

Arthur Shadwell (September 1854 – 21 March 1936) was a British physician and author, specialising in public health, temperance, and wider problems of economics and politics.

== Career ==
Arthur Shadwell was an alumnus of Uppingham School and Keble College, Oxford where he matriculated in 1874. He graduated B.A. in 1882, and B.Med.and M.A. in 1883. He completed his clinical training at Saint Bartholomew's Hospital, and became a Fellow of the Royal College of Physicians.

Shadwell was appointed as a medical advisor to the Metropolitan Asylums Board in 1900. In September 1908 he was appointed a trustee for the Queen Victoria Jubilee Institute of Nurses. Shadwell had worked as an assistant physician in Brighton at the Sussex County Hospital, before he decided to pursue his dream of writing on public health, temperance, and wider problems of economics and politics, He wrote numerous books and articles for publications like Maclean's, and in 1892 he was selected to be a special correspondent for The Times. After finishing his role as a specialist correspondent for The Times, he continued to work for them as a contributor to The Times Literary Supplement. During 1925-26 Shadwell gave the Fitzpatrick Lecture at the Royal College of Physicians and regularly gave talks to other institutions.

Shadwell's work is still quoted by fellow writers and scholars.

== Personal life ==
Shadwell was born in Langton, Yorkshire on the 21 September 1854 to The Reverend Arthur Shadwell.

Shadwell was married twice with his first wife being Bertha James and his second wife being Alice Louise Theobald. Shadwell lived at Pond Cottage and Old Yard House, Ham Common, London where he was buried at St Andrews Church.

== Bibliography ==
- 1883 The Architectural History of the City of Rome, Based on J.H. Parker's "Archaeology of Rome" For the Use of Students
- 1896 The Economic Aspects of the Bicycle
- 1898 The Tallerman Treatment by Superheated Dry Air in Rheumatism, Gout, Rheumatic Arthritis, Stiff and Painful Joints, Sprains, Sciatica, and Other Affections: Case Notes and Medical Reports with Numerous Illustrations ISBN 978-1333537630
- 1899 The London Water Supply ISBN 978-3261014108
- 1909 Industrial Efficiency
- 1912 An Encyclopædia of Industrialism ISBN 978-1330412039
- 1915 Drink, Temperance and Legislation ISBN 978-1010133483
- 1923 Drink in 1914-1922 A Lesson in Control ISBN 978-1152242166
- 1925 The Socialist Movement, 1824-1924 ASIN B000L9HQ0W
- 1926 The Breakdown of Socialism ASIN B002OJFWNU
- 1929 Typhoeus, Or The Future Of Socialism ASIN B000L6GX1I
