= St Andrew's Church, Ham =

Church in the London Borough of Richmond upon Thames

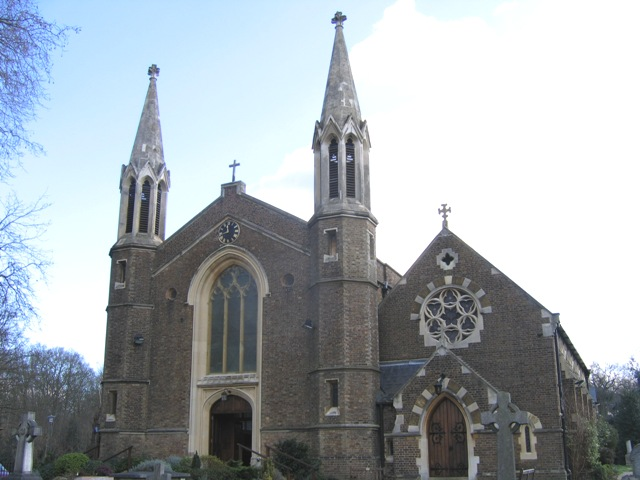
- St Andrew's Church, Ham
- 51°25′58.3″N 0°18′11.7″W
- Location: Church Road, Ham Common, Richmond TW10 5HG
- Country: England
- Denomination: Church of England
- Website: www.standrewsham.church

Architecture
- Architect: Edward Lapidge
- Years built: 1830–31

Specifications
- Materials: Bath stone dressings and London stock brickwork

Administration
- Province: Canterbury
- Diocese: Southwark
- Archdeaconry: Wandsworth
- Deanery: Kingston
- Parish: Ham, St Andrew

Clergy
- Archbishop: Justin Welby
- Bishop: Rt Revd Christopher Chessun
- Vicar: Rev Alice Pettit

Listed Building – Grade II
- Designated: 10 January 1950
- Reference no.: 1080847

St Andrew's Church, Ham, is a Grade II listed Church of England church on Church Road, Ham Common in Ham in the London Borough of Richmond upon Thames.

== Architecture ==
The church was built in grey brick in 1830–31; the architect was Edward Lapidge. A south aisle with a rose window, designed by Raphael Brandon, was added in 1860, and a chancel in red brick, by Bodley & Garner, in 1900–01. The carvings of the screen and choir stalls are by John Harper.

The church has 32 windows; eleven with stained glass installed between 1901 and 1948, four of which are by Shrigley & Hunt. The three-light window at the west end by Hugh Ray Easton, installed in 1932, shows Saint Andrew in the centre, flanked by scenes of baptism and confirmation. The east window of the Crucifixion was designed by Sir Ninian Comper (1900) and was erected in memory of Harry Scott of Ancrum (d 1889) by his stepdaughters Violet Cavendish-Bentinck and Hyacinth Jessup. Surrounding the high altar are eight large paintings of prophets and evangelists.

There is a memorial stained glass window to Sir George Dance (1857–1932), a dramatist and theatrical manager, and his son Erik who died in a prison camp in World War II. In the eastern end of the south aisle an unusual memorial plaque to Edward S Borradaile; the plaque has an outline of the part of the Northern Territory where he and his companion vanished with a cross marking 12°S 133°E where they are thought to have died.

There are also funerary hatchments at the back of the church dedicated to Lionel Tollemache, 4th Earl of Dysart and his wife Countess Grace.

== Notable interments ==
- Rev. Richard Frederick Lefevre Blunt (1833–1910) was the first Anglican Bishop of Hull since its abeyance in 1559.
- Carlos Bovill OBE (1882–1938), a balloonist in World War I.
- Violet Hyacinth Bowes-Lyon (1882–1893), who died of diphtheria at Forbes House on Ham Common. Her father was Claude George Bowes-Lyon, 14th Earl of Strathmore and Kinghorne and she was the elder sister of Elizabeth Bowes-Lyon, The Queen Mother.
- Rev. Joseph Brown (1800–1867) was vicar of Christ Church, Blackfriars. He founded the National Orphan Home for Girls on Ham Common.
- Major George Shannon Dockrell OBE (1886–1924) was an Olympic swimmer who competed at the 1908 Summer Olympics in the men's 100 metre freestyle event for Great Britain. In 1914 he joined the Rifle Brigade, 9th Battalion, and was wounded in France in August 1915; promoted to Staff Captain in 1917 and to Major and appointed OBE in 1919. He died from lingering shrapnel wounds to his back at the Officers’ Hospital, Richmond, Surrey.
- General William Eden (1768–1851), army officer who was awarded a gold medal at the capture of Java from the Dutch in 1811; he lived on Ham Common where Martingales Close is now built.
- Joshua Field JP (1829–1904), Deputy Lieutenant for Surrey, who lived at Latchmere House, son of Joshua Field FRS.
- Samuel Joseph Gray (1849–1906), was a Colour sergeant in the 4th Battalion Rifle Brigade, joining aged 15. He served 29 years including the Jowaki Expedition and the Afghan War of 1878-81. On his discharge in 1894 he became a Park Keeper and in 1899 a Yeomen of the Guard; he died at Ladderstile Lodge.
- James Pierrepont Greaves (1777–1842), was an English mystic, educational reformer, socialist and progressive thinker who founded Alcott House.
- Sir Walter Henry Harris C.M.G. (1852–3 March 1922) formerly Sheriff of the City of London, knighted in 1919.
- Emily Hornby (1833–1906) was a distinguished mountaineer and travel writer through her journals, published after her death. She and her sisters lived at the Manor House, Ham.
- Wilfred Hudleston Hudleston (1828–1909), English geologist whose epitaph records "An eminent scientist whose work and research did much towards the advancement of geology".
- Major Robert Bartholomew Lawes (1824–1907), hereditary Constable of Dover Castle and Lord Warden of the Cinque Ports.
- Sir Coutts Lindsay, 2nd Baronet (1824–1913), artist and watercolourist.
- Captain Lauchlan Bellingham Mackinnon (1815–1877), captain in the Royal Navy who wrote three books about his experiences.
- John Minter Morgan (1782–1854), author and philanthropist who founded the National Orphan Home on Ham Common in 1849.
- Sir Richard Owen (1804–1892), biologist, comparative anatomist and paleontologist.
- Vice-admiral Hyde Parker (1784–1854) a Royal Navy officer during the Napoleonic Wars and the War of 1812. He became First Naval Lord in 1852 and ensured that all new warships being procured were propelled by steam.
- Charles Gottlieb Pfander (1803–1865) of the Church Missionary Society. His epitaph reads that he was "a leading champion in the great controversy between Christianity and Mahommedanism."
- Admiral Sir Peter Richards KCB (1787–1869), Royal Navy officer who went on to be Third Sea Lord.
- Frederick G Rudler (1887–1936), twice Mayor of the City of Westminster 1933–1935.
- Henry Warren Scott, the son of Sir William Scott, 6th Baronet, of Ancrum who died on 23 August 1889 at Forbes House; his wife, Louisa Scott (1832–1918) was the maternal grandmother of Queen Elizabeth The Queen Mother and the great-grandmother of Elizabeth II.
- Arthur Shadwell (1854–1936) British physician and author, specialising in public health, temperance, and wider problems of economics and politic. He lived on Ham Common.
- Hugh Colin Smith (1836–1910), Governor of the Bank of England from 1897 to 1899.
- Sarah Smith (1832–1911), writer of children's books under the pen name Hesba Stretton.
- Charles Smyth Vereker (1818–1885), Commandant of the Limerick Artillery Militia, author of 'Scenes in the Sunny South' (1871) about Algeria, and the novel 'The Child of the Desert' (1878). He was the son of Charles Vereker, 2nd Viscount Gort and Elizabeth, his second wife, who is also buried here.
- Stewart Carmac Weigall (1864–1910), a retired Commander from the Royal Navy who served on HMS Penguin and later HMS Waterwitch for surveying duties;Weigall Reefs off Cooktown, Queensland, are named after him.

The cemetery also contains the graves of three war dead: Irene Daisy Collett of the Women's Auxiliary Air Force (d 1943), Ronald Oswald Dibben of the Royal Air Force Volunteer Reserve (d 1942) and William Samuel Hudson Palmer of the Royal Flying Corps (d 1917). Also the grave of Dr. Frederick Carson who was a captain in the R.A.M.C. in WW1 and was awarded the Military Cross in 1918.

Members of the Shafto family are buried in the cemetery.

LLutheran services in German have been held at St Andrew's since 1980.

== Gallery ==
=== Church interior ===
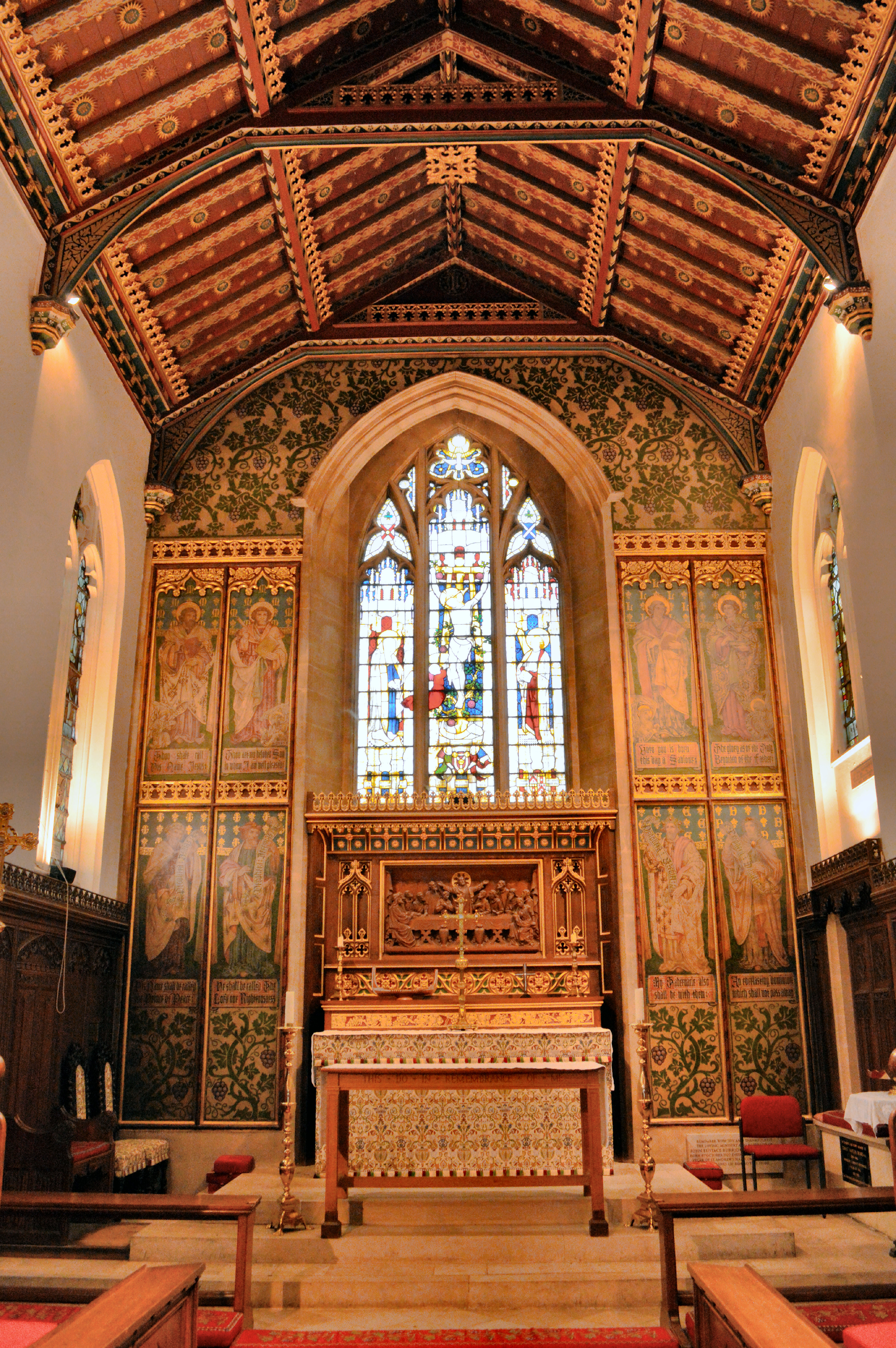
The altar

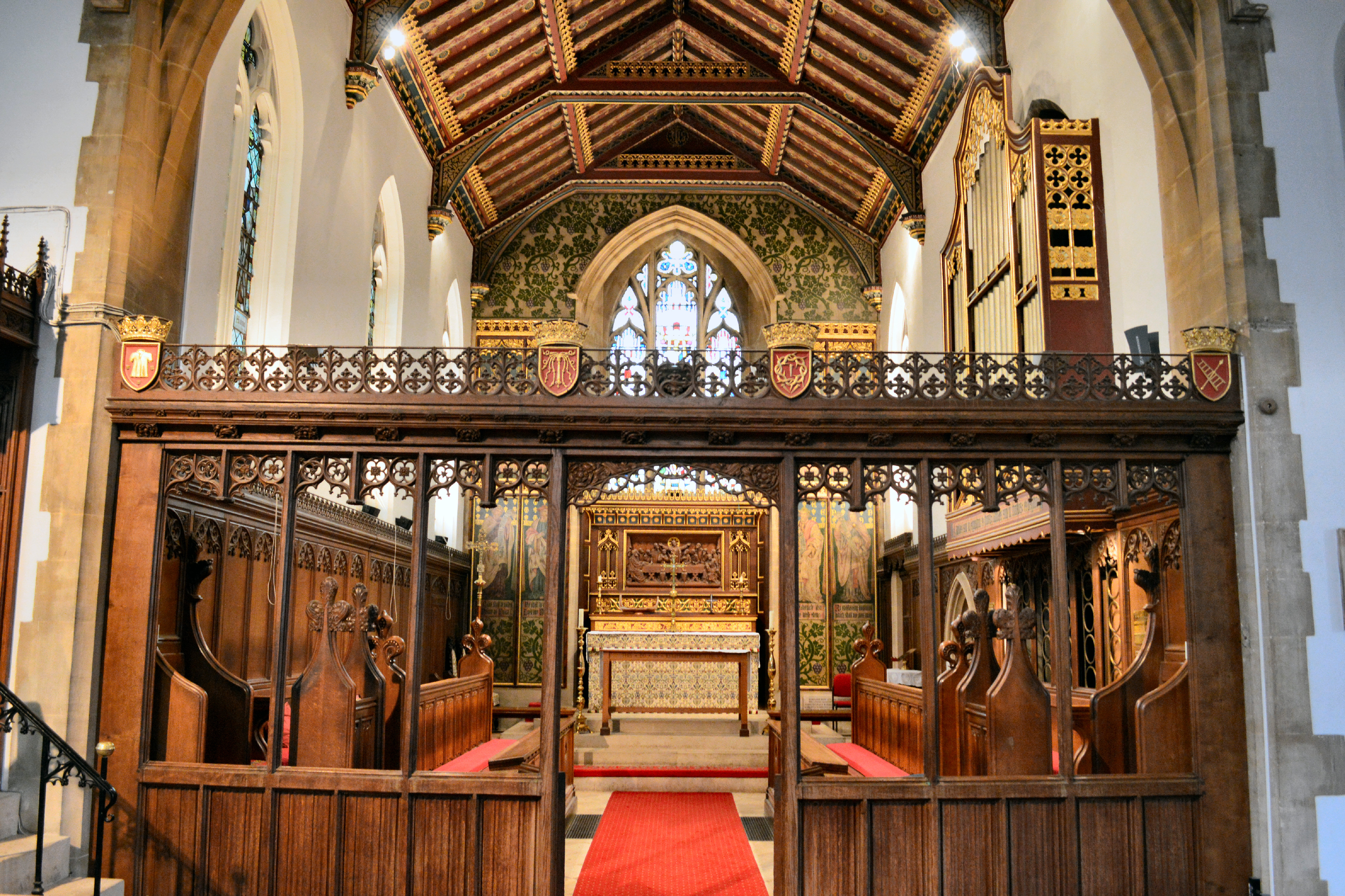
Chancel

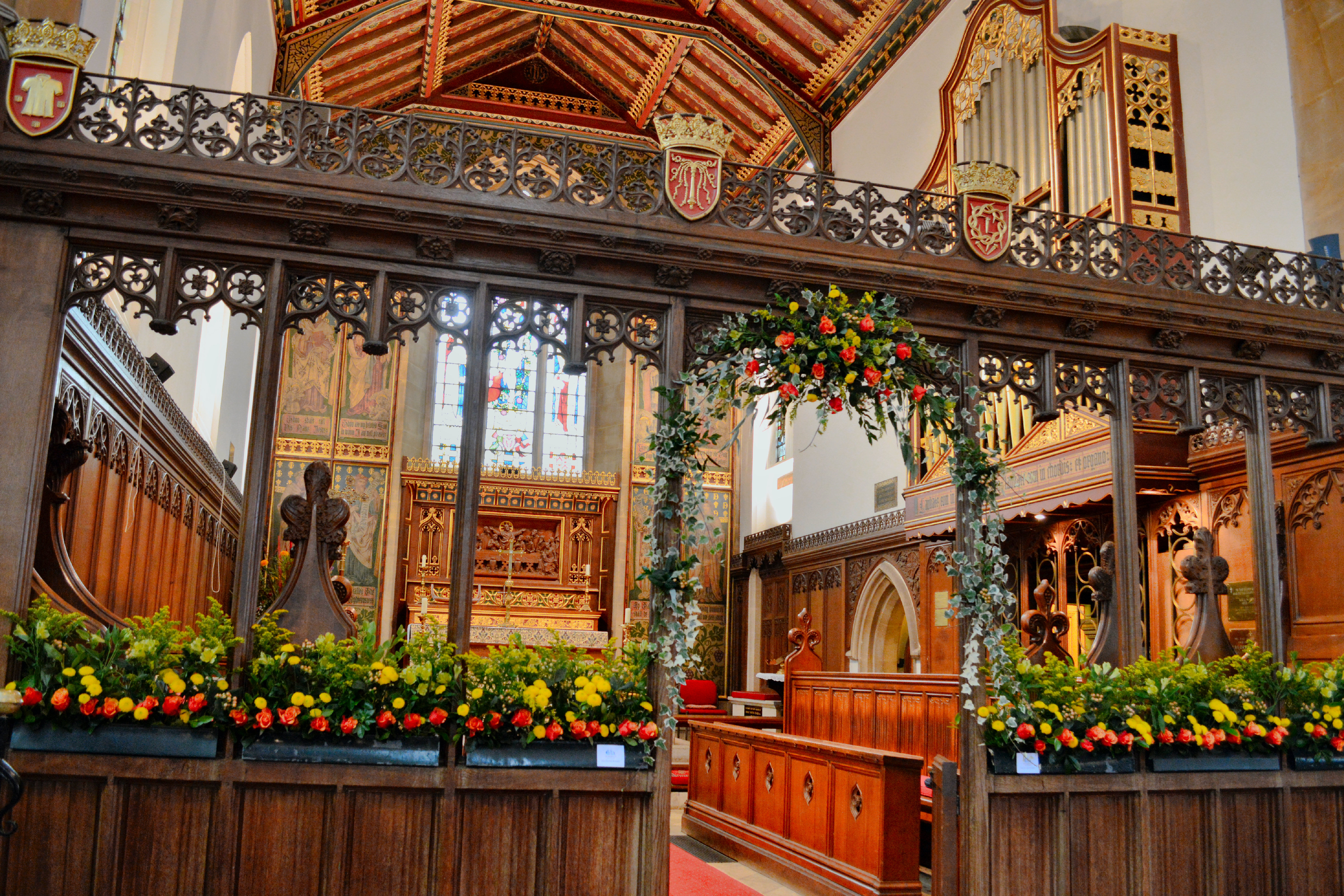
Chancel at Harvest Flower Festival

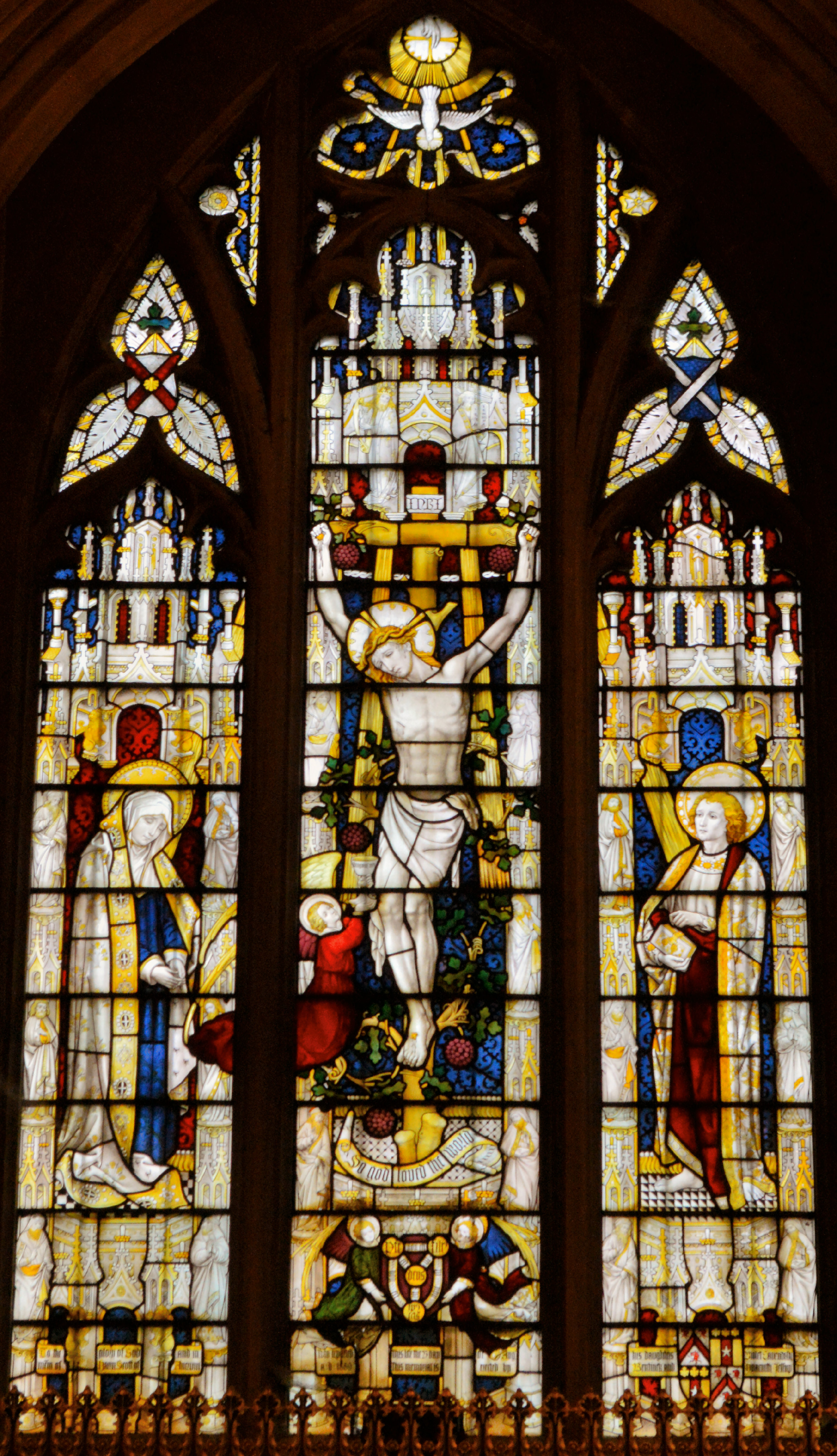
East window

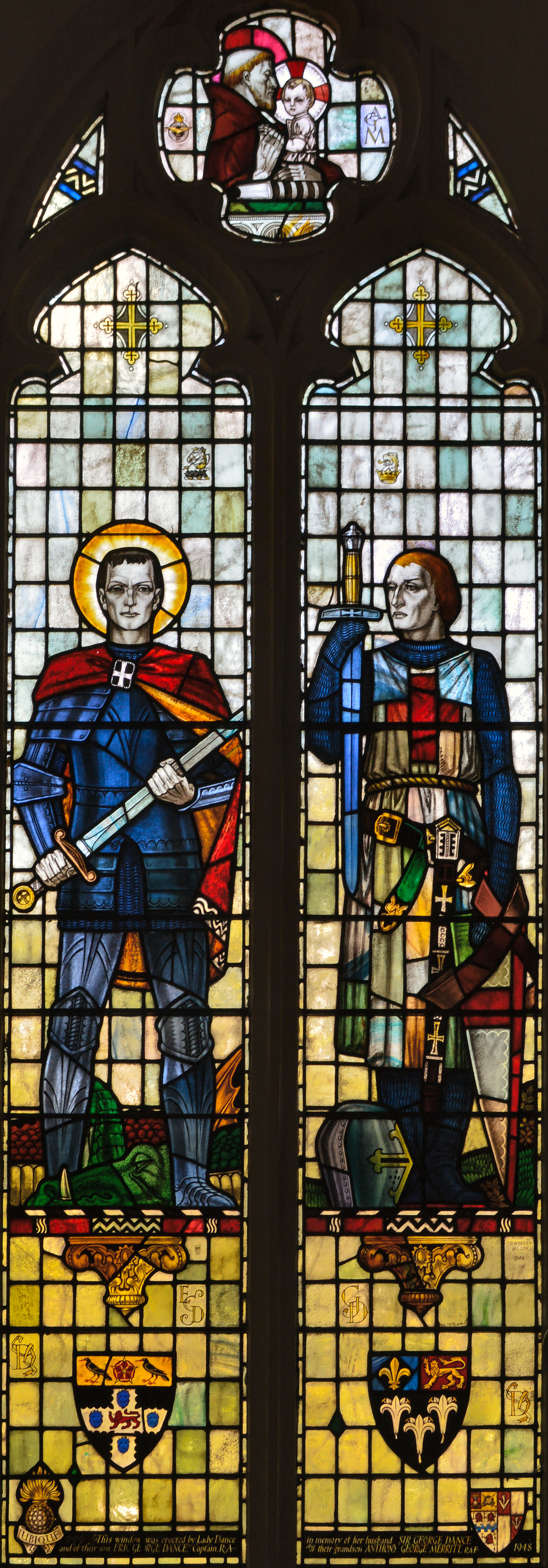
Sir George Dance window

=== Church exterior ===
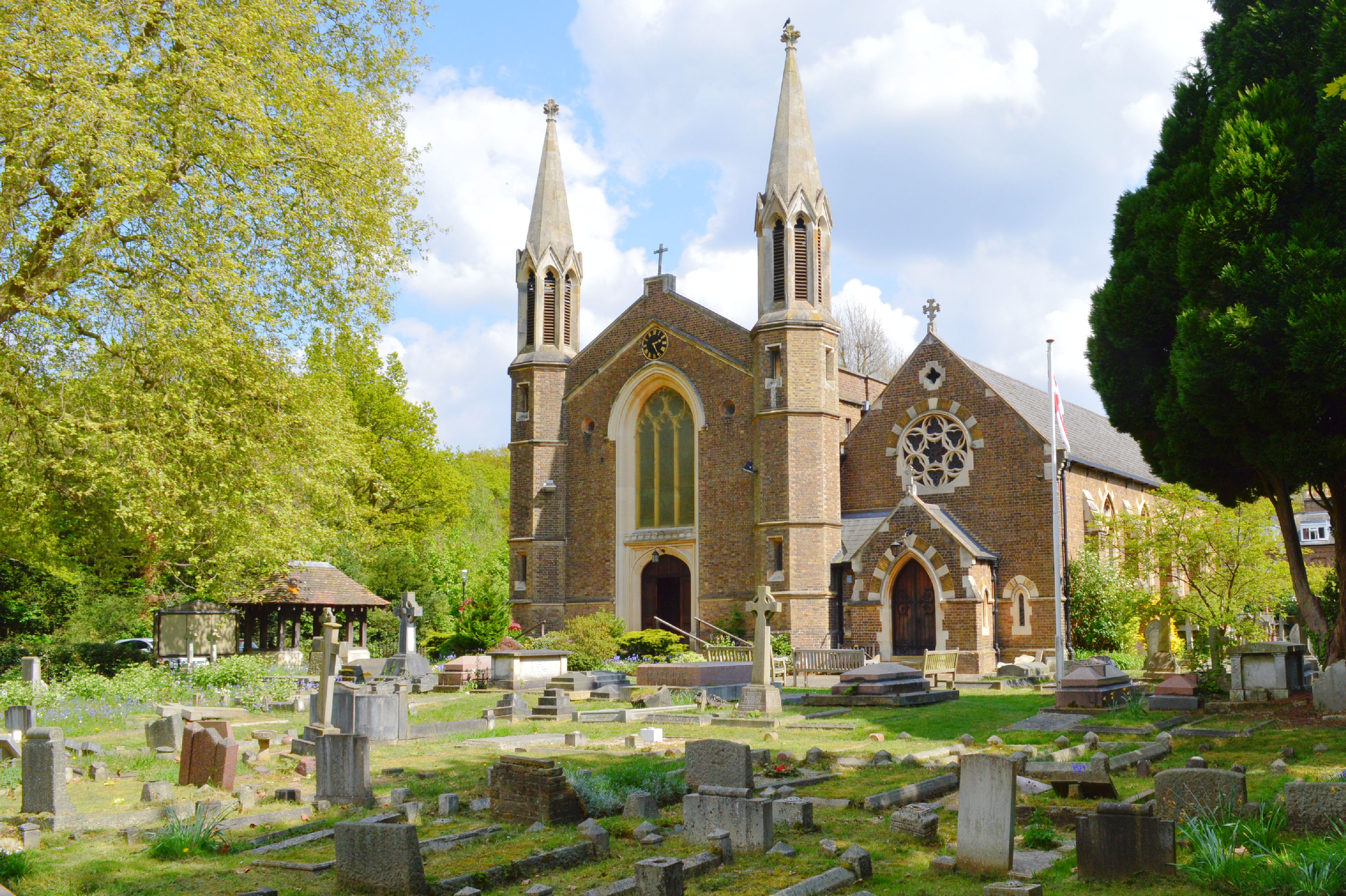
View from the cemetery

=== Churchyard tombs ===
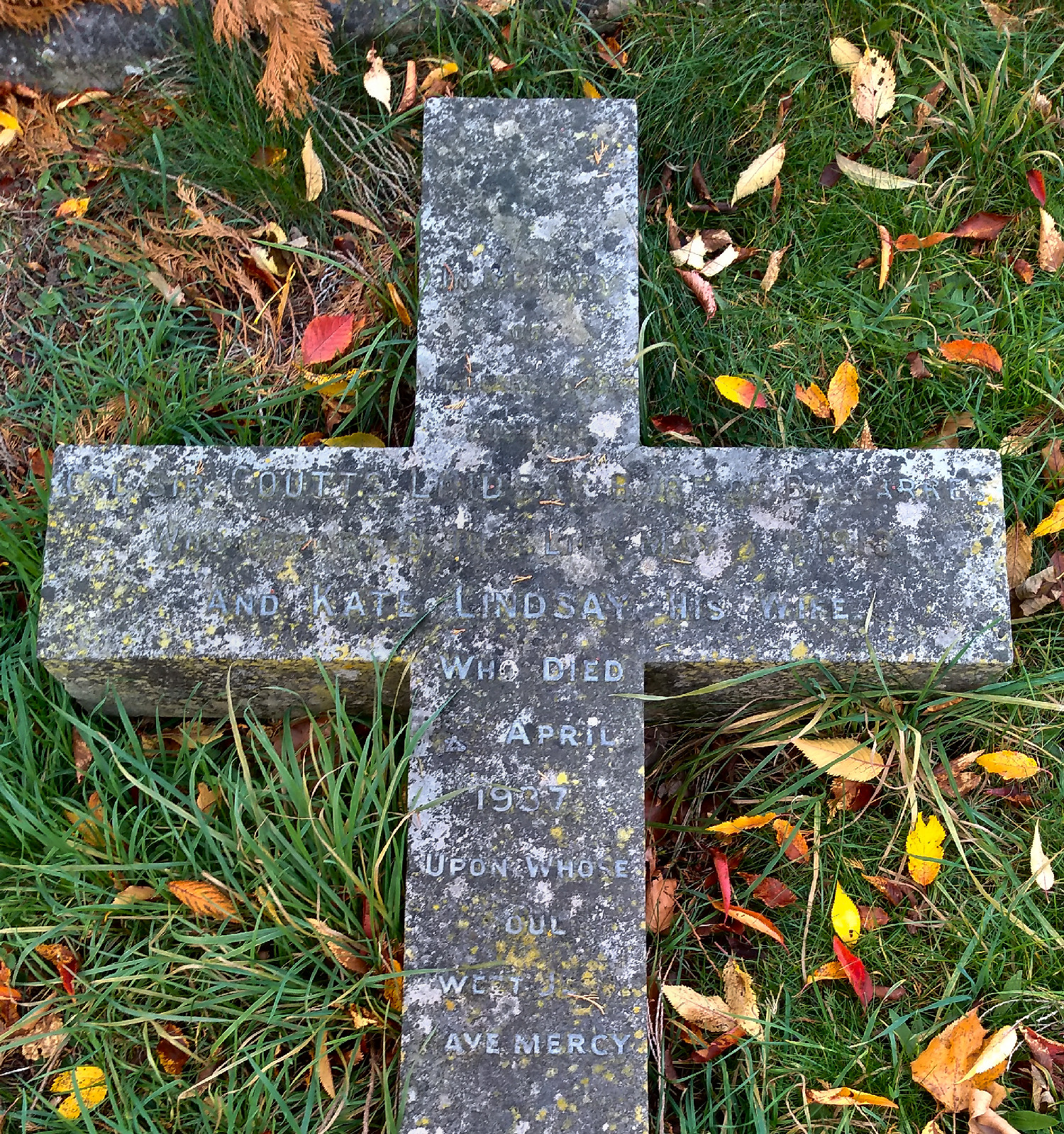
Grave of Sir Coutts Lindsay

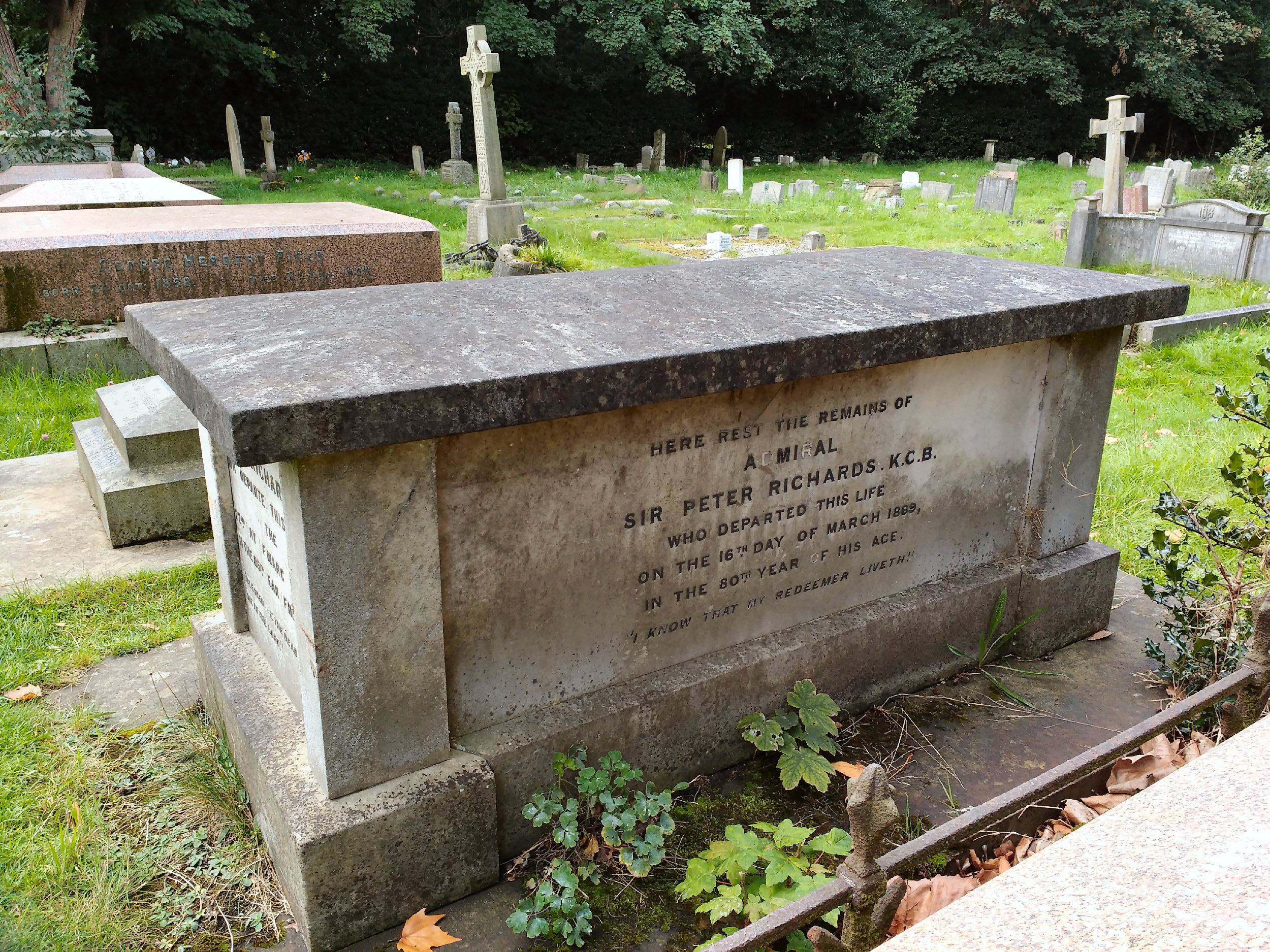
Grave of Admiral Sir Peter Richards

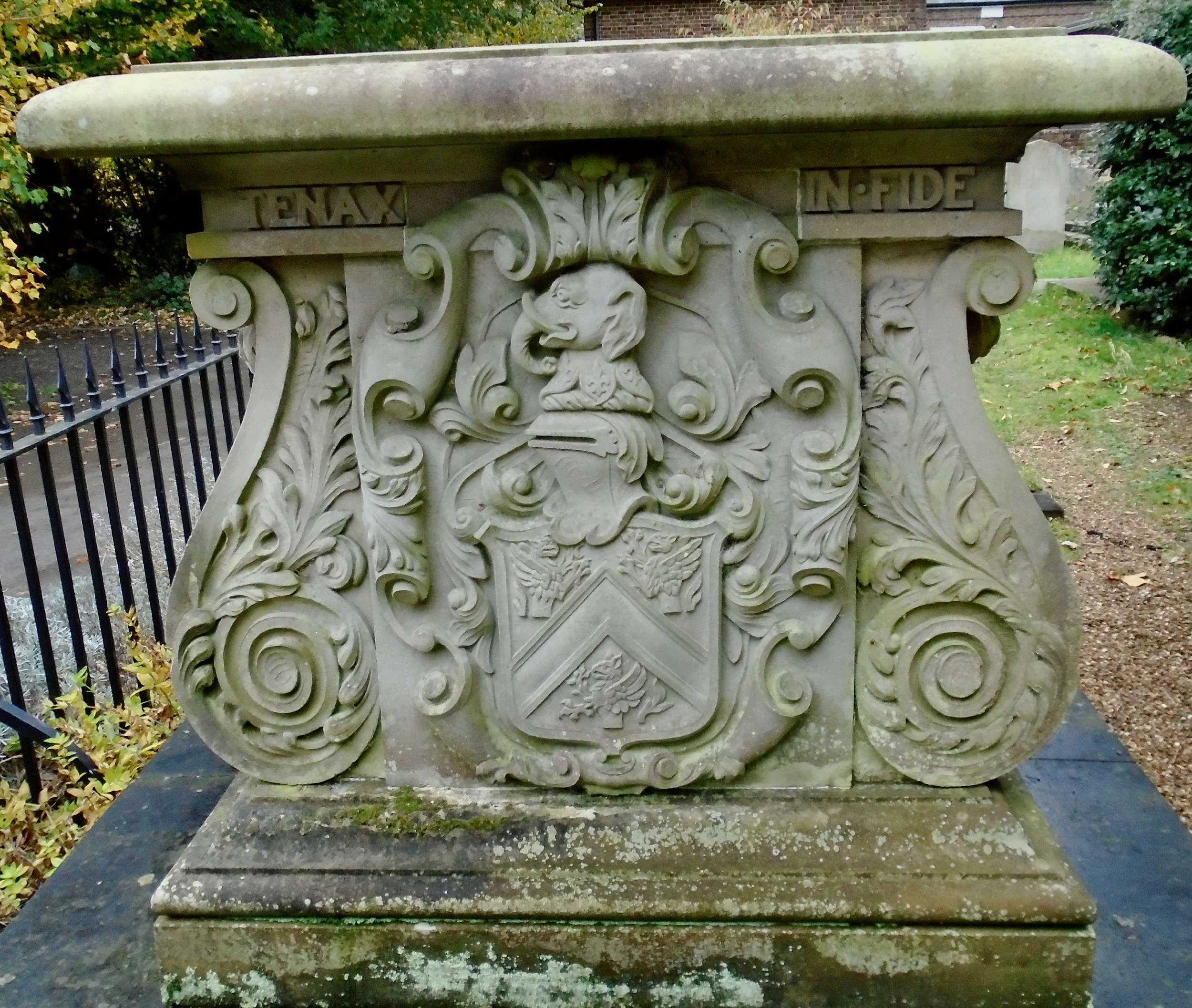
Coat of arms on Hugh Colin Smith tomb

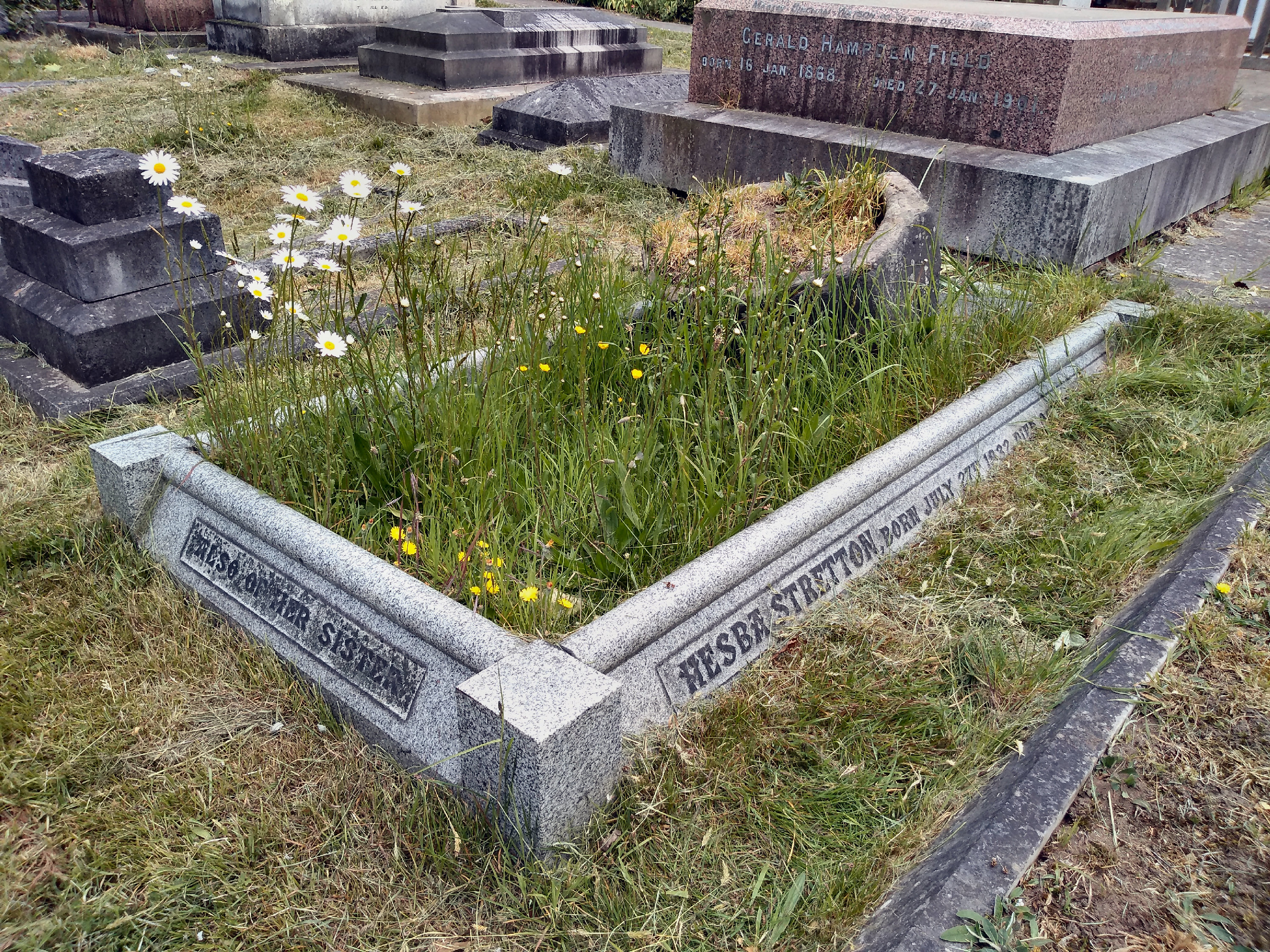
Grave of Sarah Smith (Hesba Stretton)
