= Edward Sidney Borradaile =

British engineer and journalist (1845–disappeared 1874)

- Born: 30 March 1845; Littlehampton, Sussex, UKGBI
- Disappeared: 11 June 1874 (aged 29); Northern Territory, Province of South Australia
- Occupations: Engineer; Journalist

Edward Sidney Borradaile (30 March 1845 – disappeared 11 June 1874) was a British engineer and journalist who disappeared in the Northern Territory whilst on a surveying expedition to Port Essington. At the time of his disappearance Borradaile was presumed to have been killed by Aboriginal Australians near Mount Tor Rock in Arnhem Land.

== Early life ==
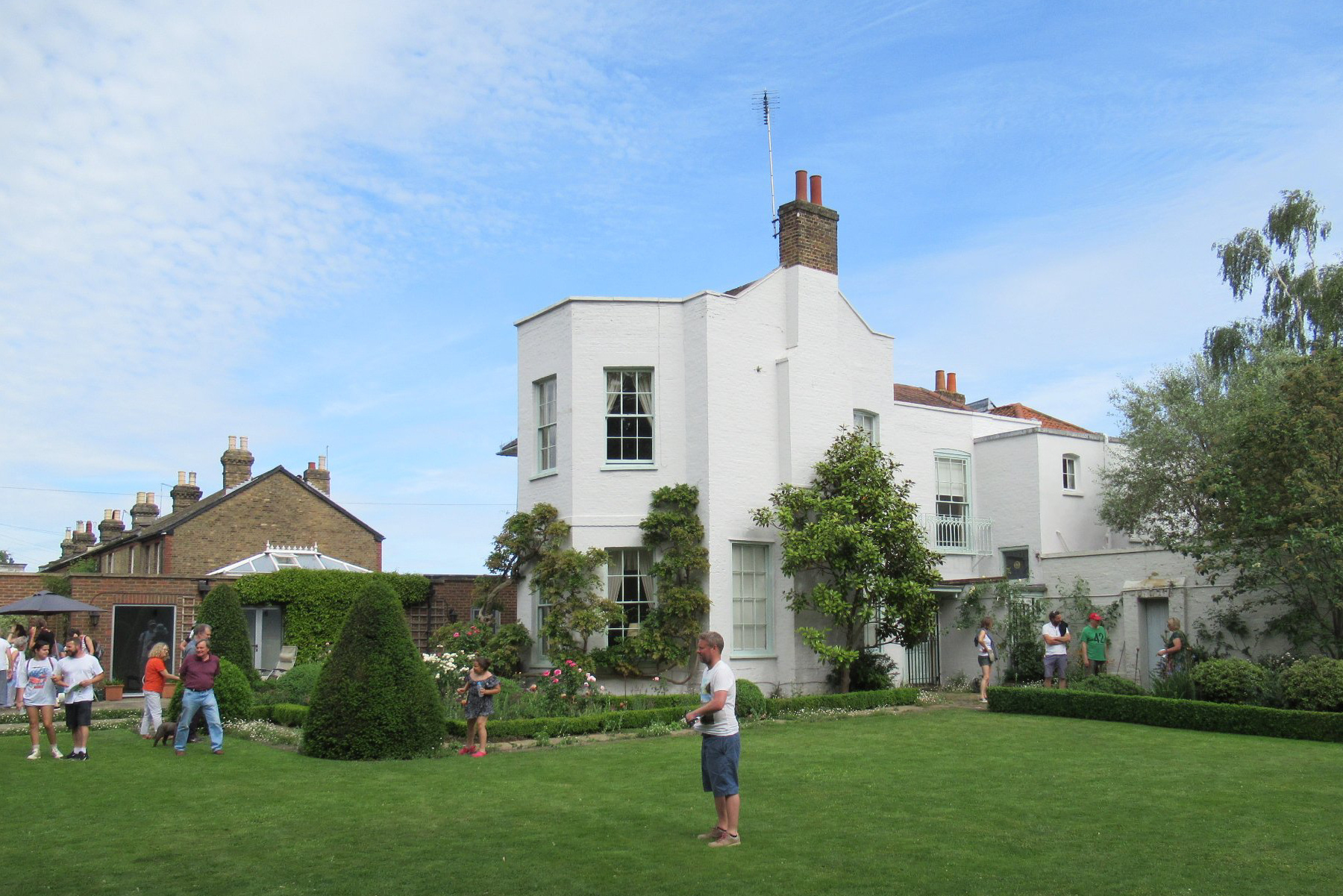
Stokes House

Edward Sidney Borradaile was born on 30 March 1845 in Littlehampton, Sussex to Harry Borradaile (1800–1876), a translator and civil servant in the Bombay Civil Service, and Alexandrina Borradaile (née Davidson; formerly Gatherer). Borradaile was the seventh of eight siblings.

From the mid 1840s to the 1870s, the Borradaile family owned Stokes Hall in Ham and had addresses in Brighton and Ealing.

== Career ==
In 1867, Borradaile and his elder brother Arthur arrived in Melbourne. Between 1868 and 1869, Borradaile worked as an assistant engineer on the Launceston and Western railway in Tasmania.

Borradaile later settled in Sandhurst (present-day Bendigo) and worked as mining correspondent for the Bendigo Independent between 1870 and 1873. Borradaile was shareholder in mining companies between 1870 and 1871, and the following year became the manager of the Christmas and Possum United Tribute Company.

By 1873, Borradaile was working as a reporter on mining in Kapunda. The same year Borradaile applied unsuccessfully for a position with the Northern Territory Government as an engineer and draftsman with experience of railway construction in Victoria and Tasmania. Borradaile later settled in Port Darwin.

== Expedition ==
In June 1874, Borradaile and Thomas Permain, a surveyor, set off with five horses from Palmerston, Darwin, via Pine Creek in the Northern Territory of Australia to explore the region around Port Essington. They were reported to be well-equipped but turned down the offer of taking a Port Essington aboriginal guide. Their last communication was a telegram on 11 June from Pine Creek.

=== Search party ===
In October a search party led by John Lewis with an Aboriginal tracker went to search for them but did not find them. “Mr. Lewis interviewed a tribe of natives near the Tor Rock, and from their replies he believed that Permain and Borrodaile were murdered by them. Mr. Lewis had a native boy with him who acted as interpreter.” They reported being attacked by 200 men armed with spears.

Another report said “that certain natives not belonging to the Port Essington tribe had recently come in with the information that two white men had been killed by a neighboring tribe, supposed to be East Alligator blacks. That previous to their murder they had robbed them of everything except their books, that the explorers declined giving up these, and were consequently murdered. The locality of this barbarous deed was described as being near the Tor Rock, which is about 725 feet in height.”

== Memorials ==
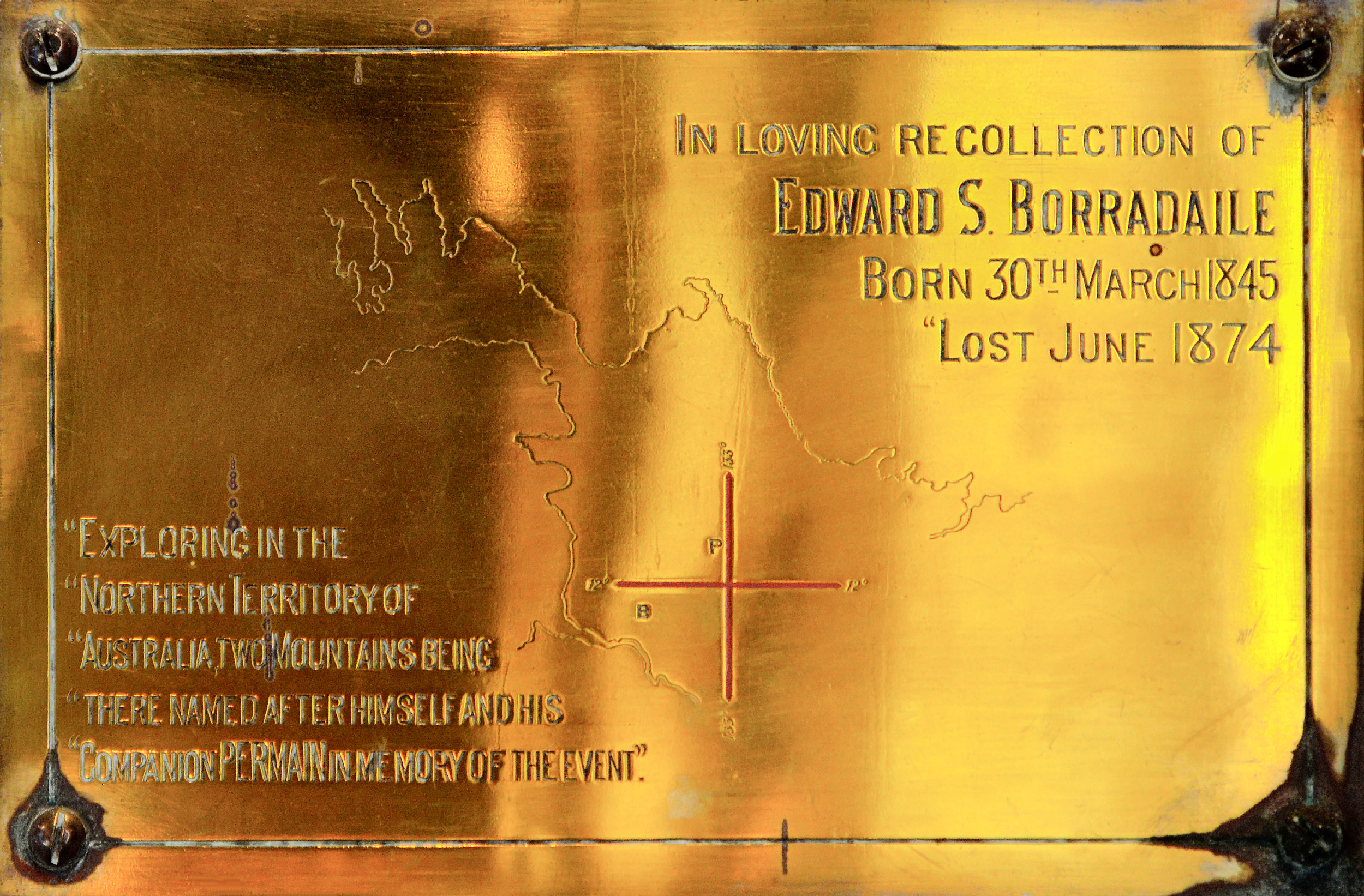
Memorial plaque, St Andrew's Church

Both men have mountains named after them: Mt Borradaile (12°19′S 133°3′E, 120m), a registered Aboriginal sacred site known as Awunbarna, and Mt Permain (11° 56’S, 132° 58’E, 189m) which is near Mt Tor.

There is a memorial plaque in Christ Church Cathedral, Darwin.

       Recalling
Edward Sidney Borradaile
      Born March 1845
      Lost June 1874
"Exploring in the Northern Territory of
Australia two mountains being there
named after himself and his companion
Permain in memory of the event."
      – Ubique Deus –

St Andrew’s Church, where both of Borradaile's parents are buried, on Ham Common has a memorial plaque to Borradaile; the plaque has an outline of the part of the Northern Territory where they vanished with a cross marking 12°S 133°E where they are thought to have died.
