= Samuel Gray =

Samuel Gray may refer to:

- Samuel Gray (Boston Massacre) (1718–1770), rope-maker slain in Boston
- Samuel Frederick Gray (1766–1828), British botanist, mycologist, and pharmacologist
- Samuel Gray (Australian politician) (1823–1889), member of the New South Wales Legislative Assembly
- Samuel Brownlow Gray (1823–1910), barrister in the Bermudas
- Samuel Joseph Gray (1849–1906), British Army soldier

== See also ==
- Sam Gray (disambiguation)
