= John Minter Morgan =

English writer and philanthropist (1782–1854)

- Born: 14 April 1782; London
- Died: 26 December 1854 (aged 72); 12 Stratton Street, Piccadilly, London
- Resting place: St Andrew's Church, Ham
- Occupations: Writer, philanthropist

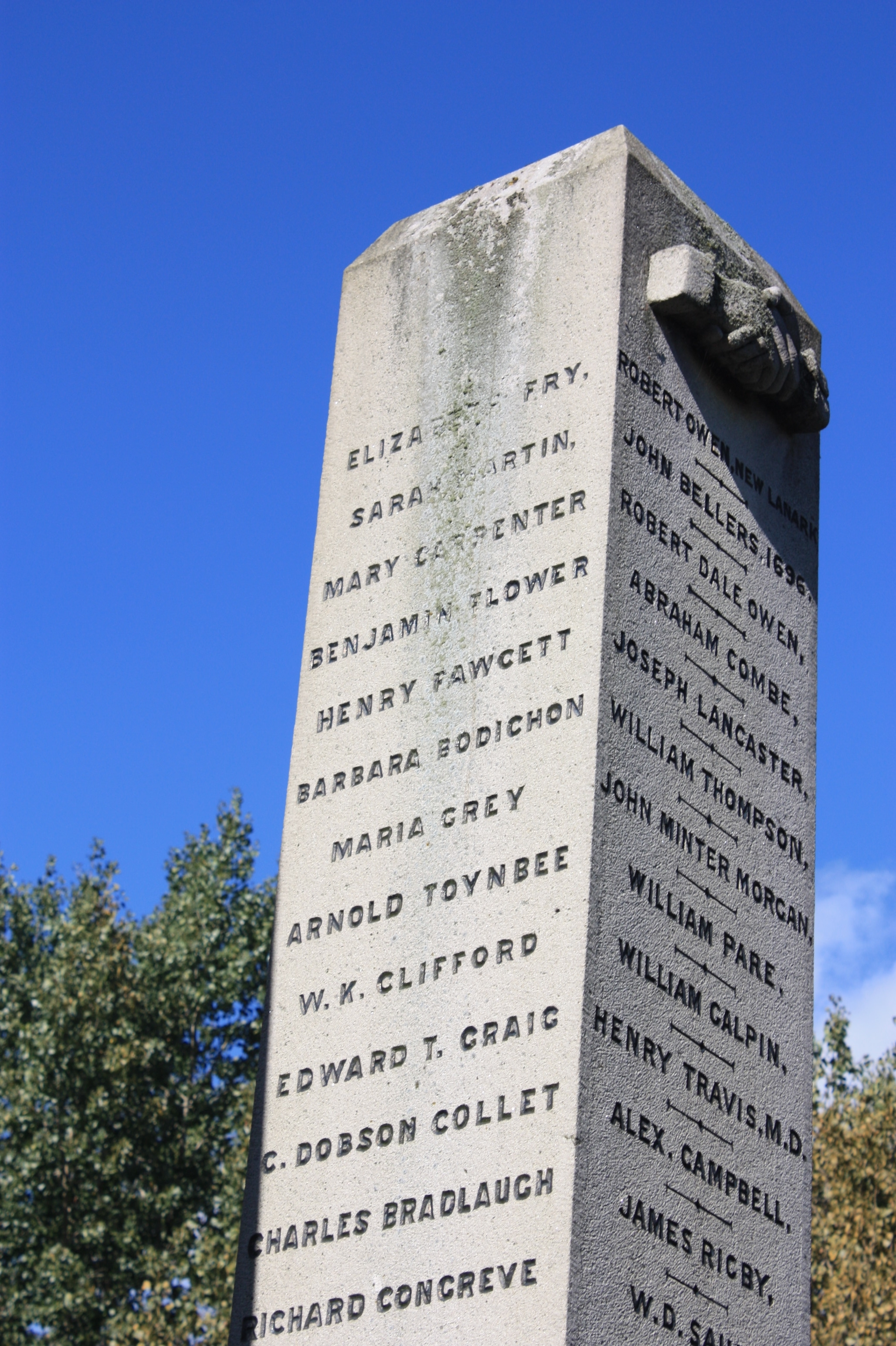
John Minter Morgan's name on the Reformers Monument, Kensal Green Cemetery

John Minter Morgan (1782–1854), was an English writer and philanthropist.

== Early life ==
John Minter Morgan was born in London in April 1782. His father, John Morgan, a wholesale stationer at 39 Ludgate Hill, and a member of the court of assistants of the Stationers' Company, died at Claydon, Suffolk, on 1 March 1807, aged 66. The son, inheriting an ample fortune, devoted himself to philanthropy.

== Works ==
His projects were akin to those of Robert Owen of Lanark but were avowedly Christian. His first book, published in 1819, entitled Remarks on the Practicability of Mr. Owen's Plan to improve the Condition of the Lower Classes, was dedicated to William Wilberforce, but met with slight acknowledgement. His next publication was an anonymous work in 1826, The Revolt of the Bees which contained his views on education. Hampden in the Nineteenth Century appeared in 1834, and in 1837 he added a supplement to the work, entitled Colloquies on Religion and Religious Education. In 1830 he delivered a lecture at the London Mechanics' Institution in defence of the Sunday morning lectures then given there. This was printed together with A Letter to the Bishop of London suggested by that Prelate's Letter to the Inhabitants of London and Westminster on the Profanation of the Sabbath.

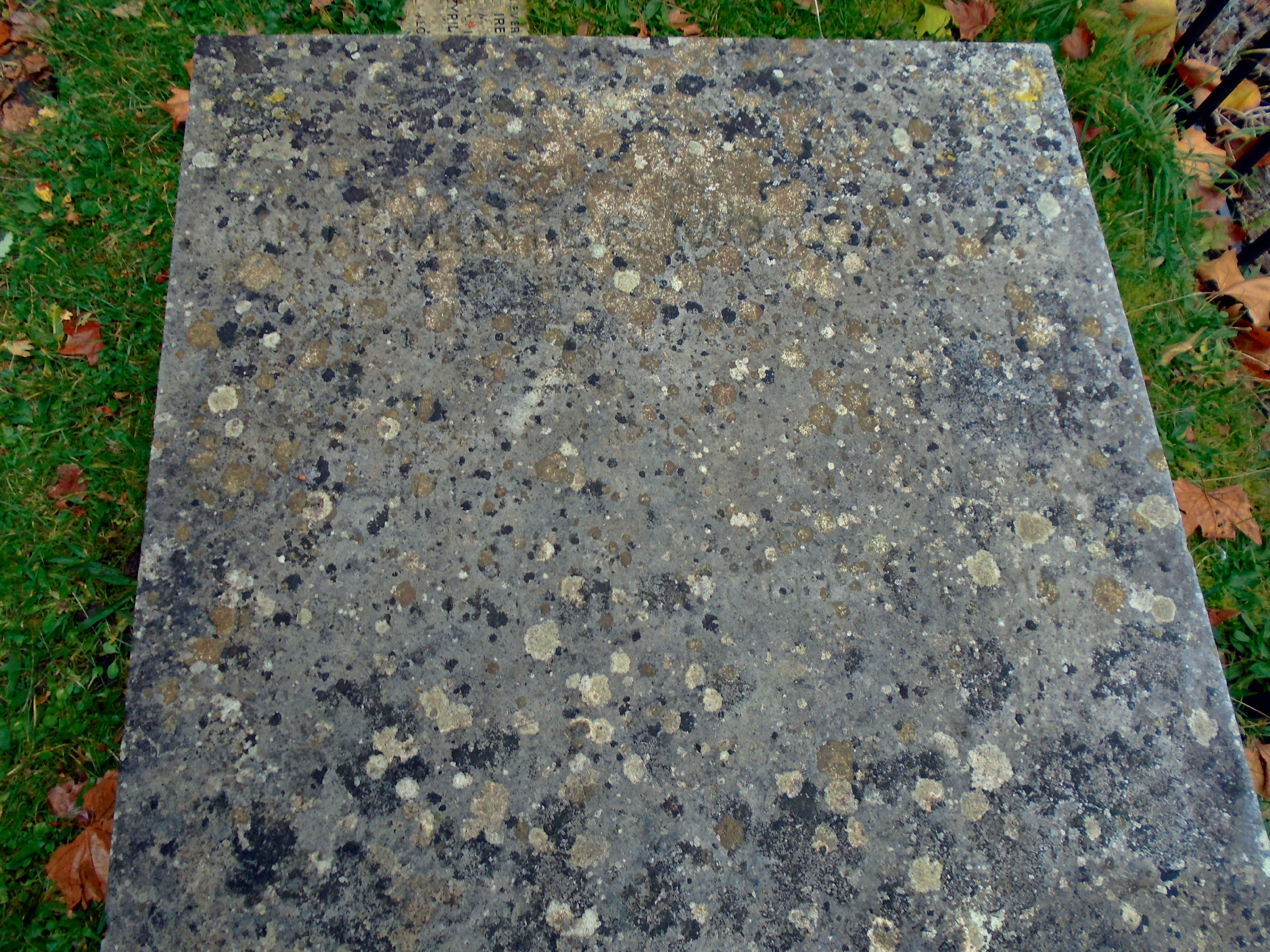
St Andrew's Church, Ham

Morgan presented petitions to parliament in July 1842 asking for an investigation of his plan for an experimental establishment to be called the Church of England Agricultural Self-supporting Institution which he further made known at public meetings, and by the publication in English and French in 1845 of The Christian Commonwealth. In aid of his benevolent schemes he printed Pestalozzi's Letters on Early Education, with a Memoir of the Author in 1827; Hannah More's Essay on St. Paul 2 vols. 1850; and Extracts for Schools and Families in Aid of Moral and Religious Training 1851. He also edited in 1849 a translation of an essay entitled Extinction du Paupérisme written by Napoleon III, and in 1851 The Triumph, or the Coming of Age of Christianity; Selections on the Necessity of Early and Consistent Training no less than Teaching. In 1850 he reprinted some of his own and other works in thirteen volumes under the title of The Phoenix Library, a Series of Original and Reprinted Works bearing on the Renovation and Progress of Society in Religion, Morality, and Science; selected by J. M. Morgan. Near his own residence on Ham Common he founded in 1849 the National Orphan Home, to which he admitted children left destitute by the ravages of the cholera. In 1850 he endeavoured to raise a sum of £50,000. to erect a Church of England self-supporting village but the scheme met with little support. He died at 12 Stratton Street, Piccadilly, London, on 26 December 1854, and was buried at St Andrew's Church on Ham Common on 3 January 1855.

Besides the works already mentioned, he published:

1. The Reproof of Brutus, a Poem 1830.
2. Address to the Proprietors of the University of London [on a professorship of education and the establishment of an hospital] 1833.
3. A Brief Account of the Stockport Sunday School and on Sunday Schools in Rural Districts 1838.
4. Letters to a Clergyman on Institutions for Ameliorating the Condition of the People 1846; 3rd edition, 1851.
5. A Tour through Switzerland, and Italy, in the years 1846–1847, 1851; first printed in the Phoenix Library, 1850.

== Sources ==
- This article incorporates text from a publication now in the public domain: Boase, George Clement (1894). "Morgan, John Minter" . In Lee, Sidney (ed.). Dictionary of National Biography. Vol. 39. London: Smith, Elder & Co. pp. 22–23.
  Boase attributes the following sources:
  - The Gentleman's Magazine: 430–1. April 1855.
  - The Illustrated London News: 177–8. 24 August 1850. with a view of the proposed self-supporting village.
- Corina, John G. "Morgan, John Minter (1782–1854)". Oxford Dictionary of National Biography (online ed.). Oxford University Press. doi:10.1093/ref:odnb/19228. (Subscription, Wikipedia Library access or UK public library membership required.)
