= Thomas Fitzpatrick (London physician) =

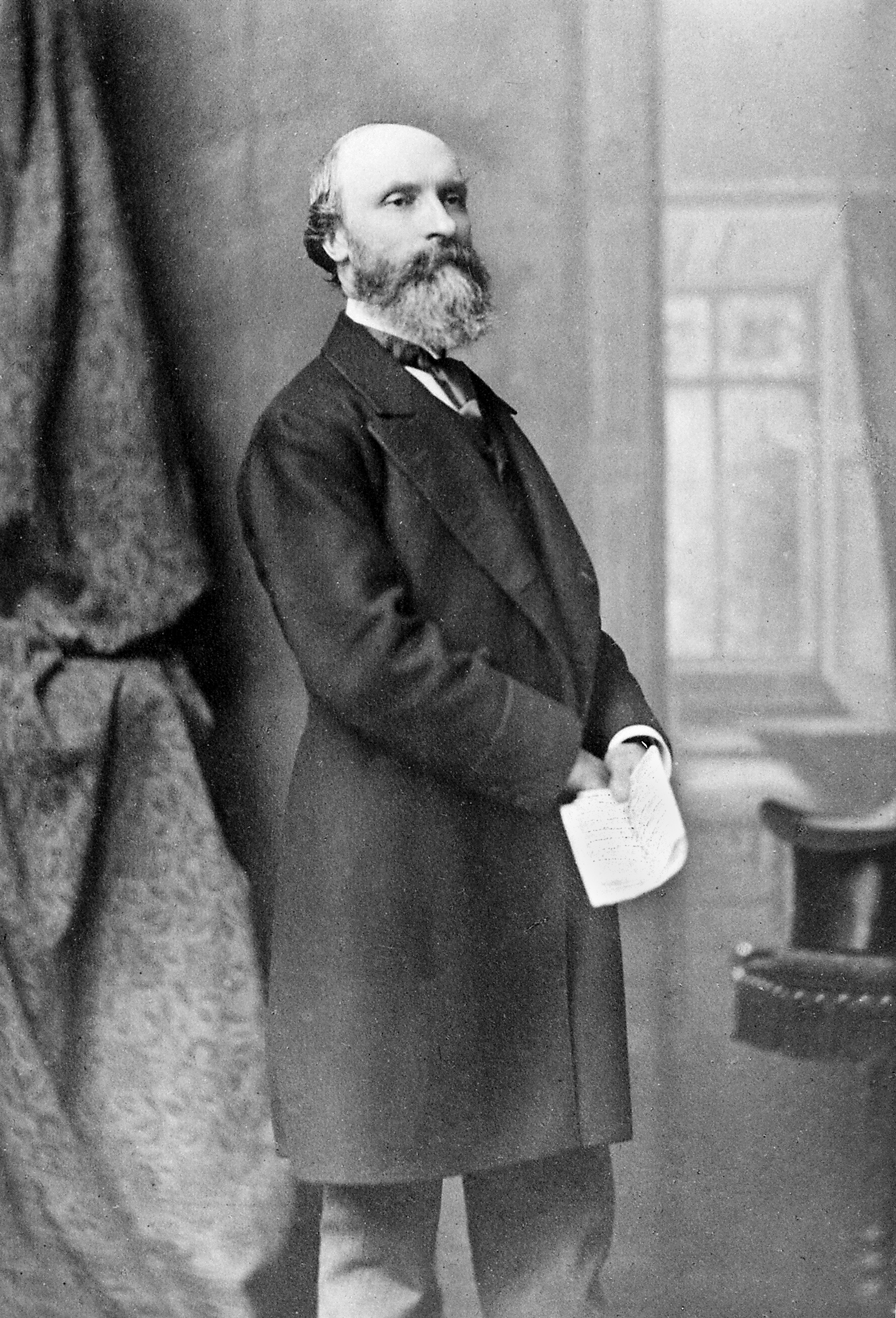
- Born: 1832; Virginia, County Cavan, Ireland
- Died: 31 May 1900 (aged 67–68)
- Education: St. Patrick's, Carlow College; Trinity College, Dublin
- Occupation: physician
- Known for: St. Bartholomew's Hospital in London
- Notable work: member, Royal College of Physicians
- Spouse: Agnes Letitia (née Robinson) (m. 1865)
- Parents: James Fitzpatrick (father); Elizabeth (née Lawler) Fitzpatrick (mother)

Thomas Fitzpatrick (1832 – 31 May 1900), born in Virginia, County Cavan, Ireland, became a prominent London physician and member of the Royal College of Physicians. He was the son of James and Elizabeth (née Lawler) Fitzpatrick and born in the Headfort Arms Hotel, Virginia where his parents were the proprietors. From a privileged upbringing Thomas was educated at St. Patrick's, Carlow College, a school well noted for turning out many fine Catholic theologians. However his university education at Trinity College, Dublin enabled him to distinguish himself in medicine where he qualified with a BA in 1853, MA in 1854, MB and MD by 1856. During this time Thomas Fitzpatrick also practiced as a doctor in the County Cavan village of Mullagh before entering service during 1856 with the British East India Company as an assistant surgeon, an experience which was to leave a lasting impression on him, through his future attitudes towards primitive medicine, magic and religion.

On his return to England, Thomas Fitzpatrick took up a position with St. Bartholomew's Hospital in London and in 1868 he became a member of the Royal College of Physicians. He took up a private practice near Hyde Park, London and was married to Agnes Letitia (née Robinson) in May 1865. Thomas Fitzpatrick died 31 May 1900 aged 68, after which his wife took to publish some of his writings, Tours and Excursions on the Continent and established the Fitzpatrick Lecture, 'a study in the history of medicine' to his memory at the Royal College of Physicians. Agnes died in 1912, aged 90.

== Biographies ==
- Broken Hand: The Life of Thomas Fitzpatrick, Mountain Man, Guide and Indian Agent by LeRoy R. Hafen: This is considered the definitive biography of Fitzpatrick, offering a detailed and well-researched account of his life from his early days as a trapper to his later roles as guide and Indian agent.
- Pathfinder: Thomas Fitzpatrick and the Opening of the American West by David Lavender: This biography follows Fitzpatrick through his various adventures and contributions to westward expansion, highlighting his skill as a guide and negotiator.
