= Sam Gray =

Sam Gray may refer to:

- Sam Gray (baseball) (1897–1953), pitcher in Major League Baseball
- Sam Gray (musician), British singer-songwriter
- Sam Gray (footballer, born 1880) (1880–1944), Australian rules footballer
- Sam Gray (footballer, born 1992), Australian rules footballer

== See also ==
- Samuel Gray (disambiguation)
- Sam Grey (disambiguation)
