= A Short History of Medicine =

1928 medical textbook by Charles Singer

- Author: Charles Singer
- Language: English
- Subject: History of medicine
- Published: 1928
- Publisher: Oxford University Press
- Publication place: UK

A Short History of Medicine is a book by Charles Singer, published in 1928 by Oxford University Press.
