= Samuel Joseph Gray =

English soldier and Yeoman of the Guard (1849–1906)

Samuel Joseph Gray (1849–1906), was a Colour sergeant in the 4th Battalion Rifle Brigade. He served 29 years with 18 years in India and Afghanistan. On his discharge in 1894 he became a Park Keeper and in 1899 a Yeomen of the Guard.

== Early life ==
Samuel Joseph Gray was born in Stokes Croft, Bristol, and baptised on 8 April 1849 at St Andrew's church, Montpelier, Bristol. Aged just 15 he enlisted on 21 February 1865 in the 4th Battalion Rifle Brigade at Peshawar, where his father was stationed.

== Army career ==
In 1876 Samuel served on the body guard for the visit of the Prince of Wales, later Edward VII, to India. In his service record he relates that "during his stay at Agra killed a large snake about to enter Prince Louis of Battenberg's tent and was thanked by the Prince of Wales and rewarded by Prince Louis for so doing."

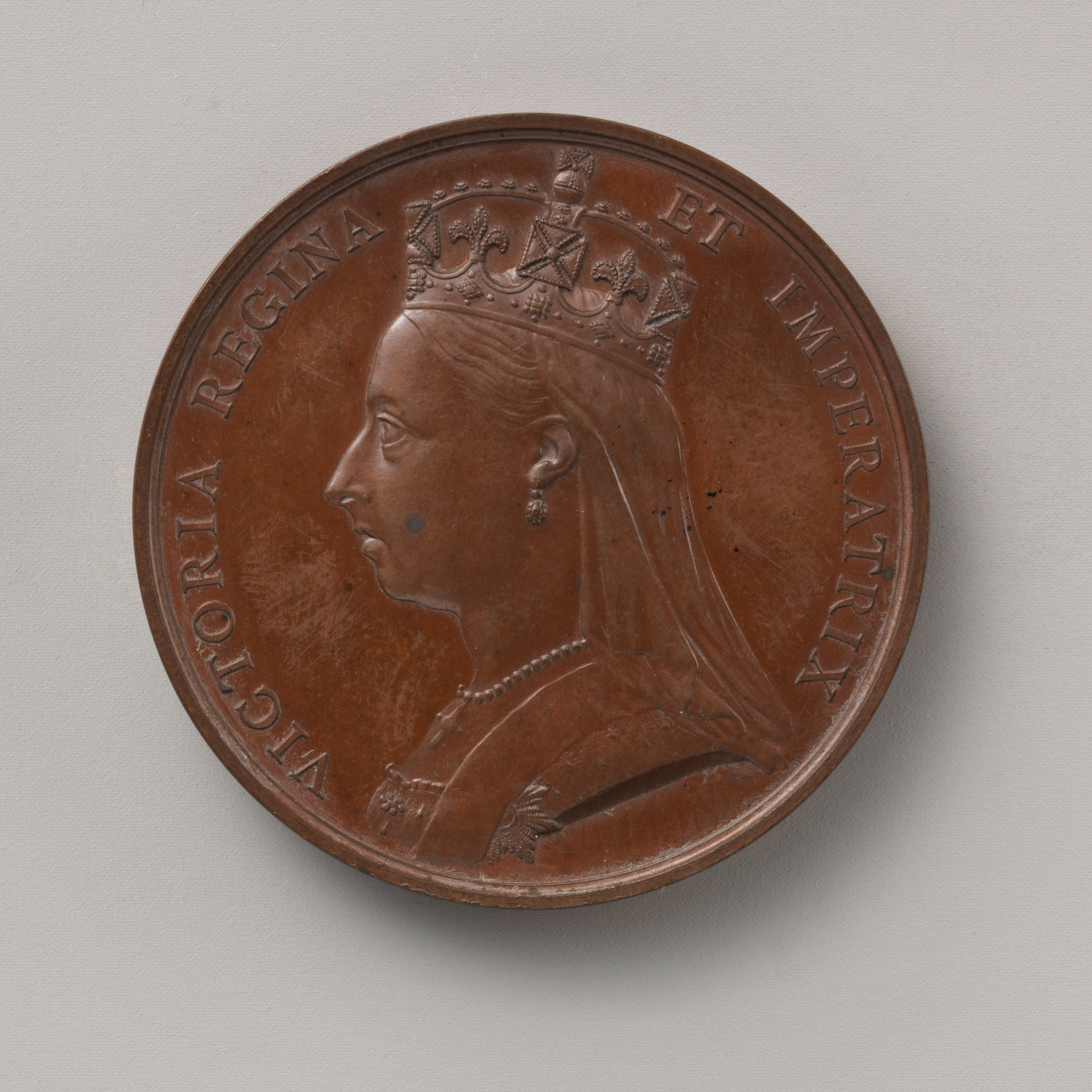
The Afghanistan Medal

He served in the Jowaki Expedition of 1877–78, which was a British punitive expedition in India; he was in charge of the transport animals. He served in the Afghan campaign 1878 and 1879, "having charge of the Regimental Ammunition mules, proceeding with a detachment of the Rifle Brigade to the Bazzaar and Longman vallies. On the return of the Battalion from the front was in Regimental Orders to be specially promoted to full corporal for hard work and good services during the campaigns and was brought to the notice of Major General Maude. On the Second Afghan War breaking out and General Maude knowing I was well versed in the native language applied to Col L R H Newdigate to forward me at once to the front to take over the duties of Transport Sergt Major to the Kurrum Valley Field Force, which duties I carried out for 18 months and was highly commended by General Tytler for the way on which I sent out the convoys to the front, and was recommended by him to the General Officer commanding the division to be raised to a higher rate of pay." "On my return from Afghanistan was ordered to Rawul Pindee to take over and organise the transport there, this done I was ordered to Jhelum for the same purpose and to fit out 1000 animals for the Wazeree Expedition for the Rifle Bd and others."

He was awarded the India General Service Medal with the Jowaki clasp, the Afghanistan medal, and the Long Service Good Conduct Medal. On returning to England he served on the London Recruiting staff from 1885, retiring 3 May 1894.

== Later career ==
He was appointed a Park Keeper at Richmond Park in April 1894.

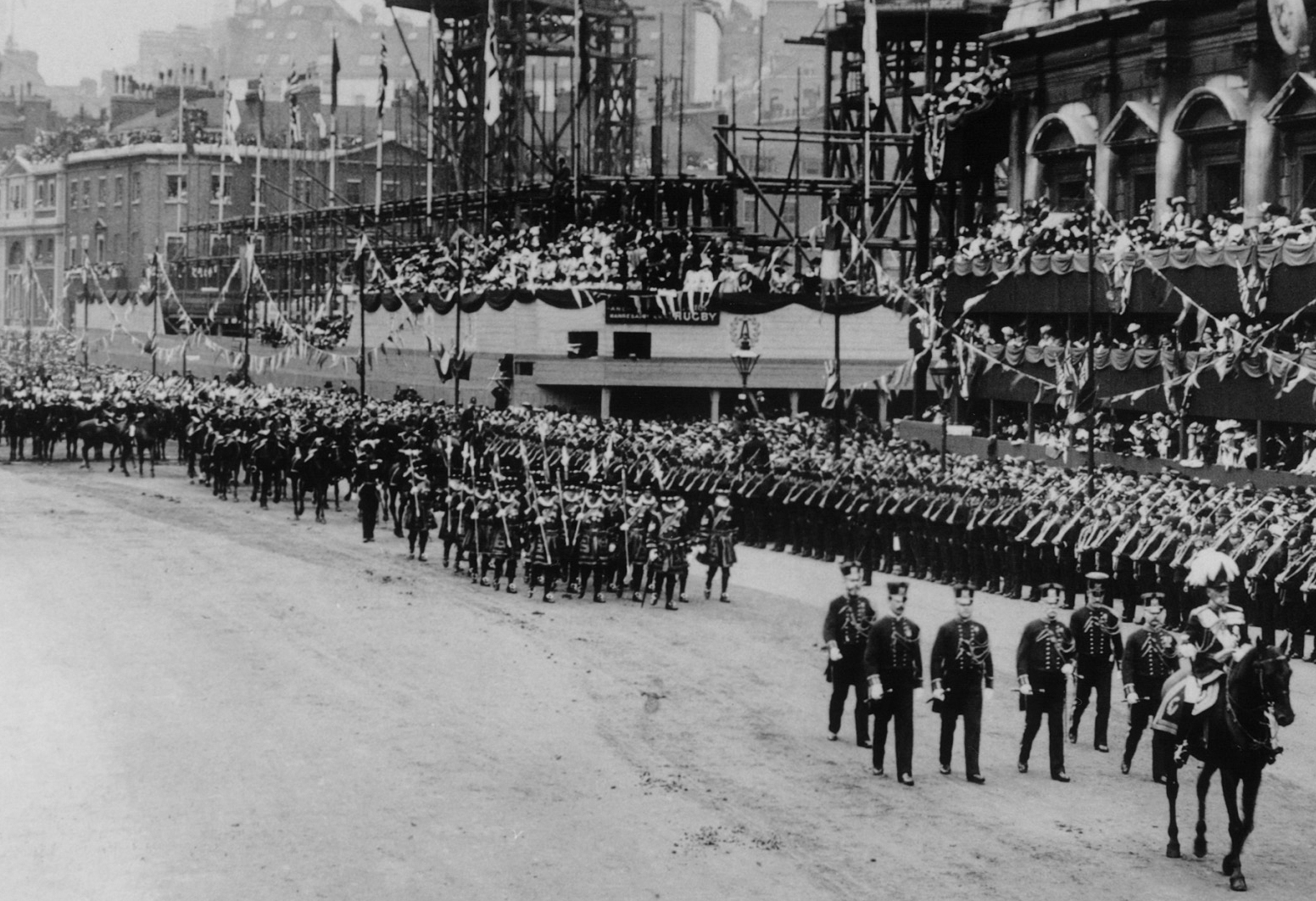
1902 Coronation Parade

On 18 January 1899 he was appointed a Yeoman of the Guard, who are based at St James's Palace, and served until his death. Members had to have served for at least 22 years in the army, attained at least the rank of Sergeant or Petty Officer, and been awarded the Long Service and Good Conduct Medal. The Yeomen have a purely ceremonial role and wear the Tudor red and gold uniform. The Times writing about the coronation procession in 1902 for the Coronation of King Edward VII wrote “then the Yeomen of the Guard marching right sturdily with their medieval weapons on the shoulders." One of those 20 beefeaters would have been Samuel Gray. He was awarded the 1902 Coronation Medal for his part in the Coronation.

== Personal life ==
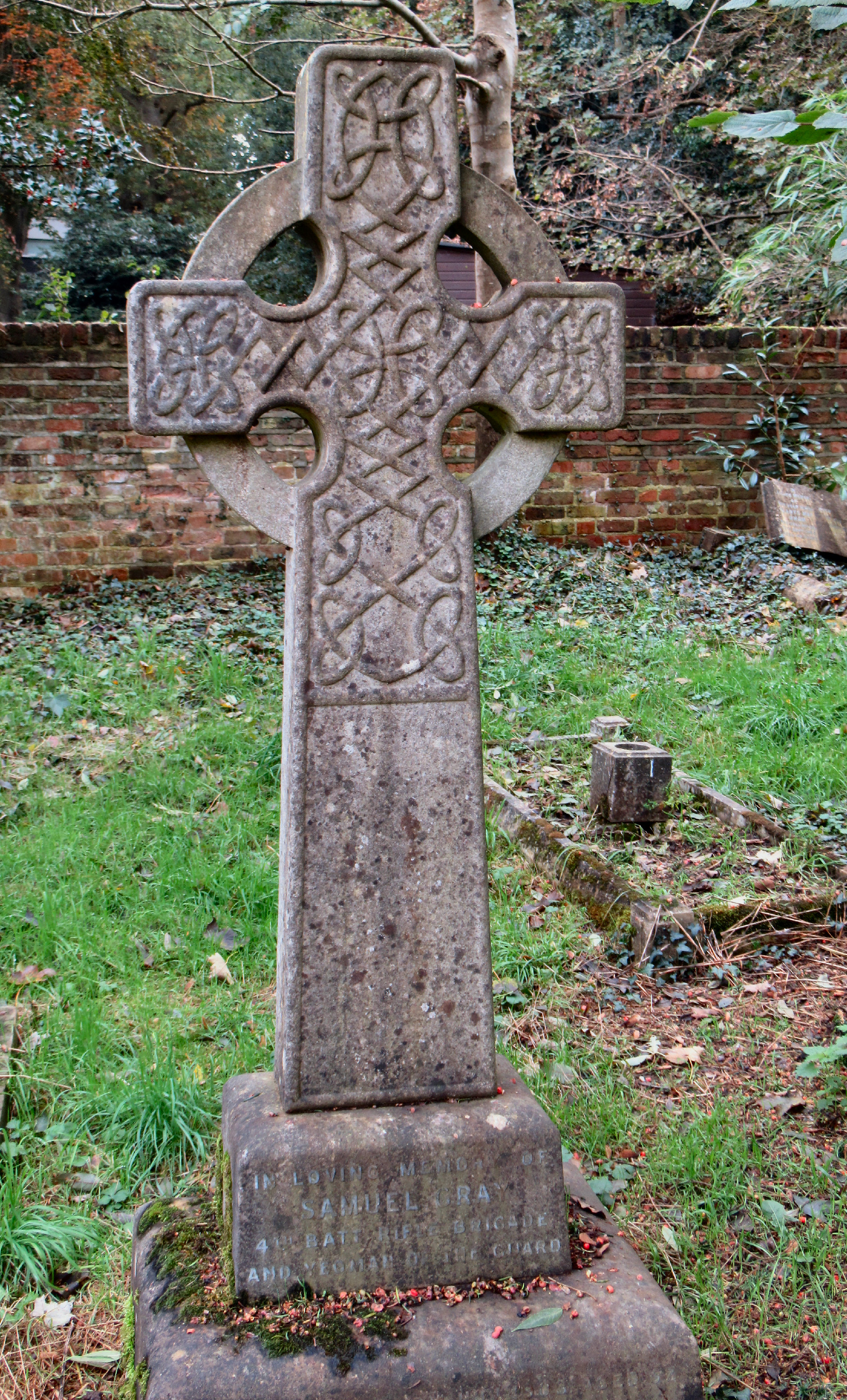
St Andrew's Church, Ham

He married Ellen (b 1855, Croydon) about 1880 in India and his first child was born there.

He died at Ladderstile Lodge, Richmond Park, on 12 November 1906. Ladderstile gate was the last gate to lose its stepladder for pedestrian access in the 1880s.

Gray is buried in the graveyard at St Andrew's Church, Ham. The Surrey Comet reported his military funeral, which was attended by his brother who was in the Metropolitan Police. His coffin was borne on a gun-carriage led by Royal Dragoons from Hounslow with six sergeants of the Rifle Brigade from Winchester acting as pall-bearers.
