= John Davy Rolleston =

English physician and folklorist

John Davy Rolleston FSA, FRCP
- Born: 25 February 1873; Oxford
- Died: 13 March 1946 (aged 73)
- Education: University of Oxford
- Occupation: Physician
- Medical career
- Sub-specialties: Infectious diseases

John Davy Rolleston FSA FRCP (25 February 1873 – 13 March 1946) was an English physician and folklorist, who published extensively on infectious diseases and the history of medicine. Overshadowed by his brother, Sir Humphry Rolleston, he established himself as an epidemiologist, gave the Fitzpatrick Lecture at the Royal College of Physicians in 1935-1936 and became involved in numerous other learned societies and medical bodies, including The Royal Society of Medicine and the Society for the Study and Cure of Inebriety.

He became the president of three sections of the Royal Society of Medicine, London, including the History of Medicine Section from 1924 to 1926.

== Early life and family ==
John Rolleston was born in Oxford on 25 February 1873 to George Rolleston, Linacre professor of anatomy and physiology at the University of Oxford, and Grace Davy, the niece of Sir Humphry Davy. His brother was Sir Humphry Rolleston (1862–1944). He was educated at Marlborough College, and from 1891 at Brasenose College, University of Oxford, as a classical scholar, before going on to Charing Cross Hospital in 1895 and qualifying in 1900.

He married Mary Edith Waring in 1917, the daughter of Mr C. E. Waring, of Cardiff, and they had a son and a daughter.

== Medical career ==
His medical career began in 1902 with an appointment to the Fever Hospital Service of the Asylums Board as assistant medical officer at Brook Hospital, before moving to the Grove Fever Hospital. Rolleston remained here throughout the First World War when it was acquired by the military. His interest in infectious diseases was reflected in his handbook on Acute Infectious Diseases, published in 1925, where he highlighted the seriousness of otitis media as a complication of scarlet fever and his experience with the ineffectiveness of using vaccines to treat whooping cough.

In 1926, Rolleston became the medical superintendent of the Metropolitan Asylums Board Infection Hospital Service. The London County Council took over the Metropolitan Asylums Board Hospitals four years later, resulting in a post as medical superintendent of the Western Fever Hospital, Fulham, where he remained until retirement. His medical career therefore, was largely spent in the study of infectious diseases and paediatrics.

He was elected a fellow of the Royal College of Physicians in 1931, and was a member of a number of medical bodies including the French Society of Paediatrics. He was president of the Society for the Study and Cure of Inebriety and campaigned against the abuse of alcohol and use of tobacco. At the Royal Society of Medicine, he held presidency positions in the sections of epidemiology, paediatrics and clinical medicine.

== History of medicine ==
Like his brother, Humphry, he advocated humanism and was interested in the history and philosophy of medicine, a subject on which he was regarded as an authority.

In 1922, he served as general secretary of the International Congress of the History of Medicine held in London and was an original member of the history of medicine section of the Royal Society of Medicine, later a member of its council and eventually its president between 1924 and 1926. He served the section throughout his life.

In 1931, he published one of the most complete biography's of Jean-Baptiste Bouillaud and in 1937, he published The History of the Acute Exanthemata, based on his Fitzpatrick lectures (1935–36), presented at the Royal College of Physicians.

Rolleston was a noted folklorist and fellow of the Society of Antiquaries of London.

== Death and legacy ==
Rolleston died on 13 March 1946, his career and reputation somewhat overshadowed by the imposing personality of his brother, Humphrey. His papers are part of the Rolleston collection held by the Wellcome Collection.

His grandson is journalist Frank Gardner.

== Selected publications ==
- Acute Infectious Diseases: A Handbook for Practitioners and Students. William Heinemann, London, 1925.
- "Jean Baptiste Bouillaud (1796-1881). A Pioneer in Cardiology and Neurology", Proceedings of the Royal Society of Medicine, Vol. 24, pp. 1253–1262.
- The History of the Acute Exanthemata: The Fitzpatrick Lectures for 1935 & 1936. William Heinemann, London, 1937.
