= Cullen Medal =

Royal College of Physicians of Edinburgh award

- Awarded for: “the greatest benefit done to Practical Medicine”
- Country: United Kingdom
- Presented by: Royal College of Physicians of Edinburgh
- Hosted by: Royal College of Physicians of Edinburgh

The Cullen Medal, named for William Cullen, is awarded by the Royal College of Physicians of Edinburgh for “the greatest benefit done to Practical Medicine”.
