= Charles Singer =

British historian (1876–1960)

Charles Joseph Singer
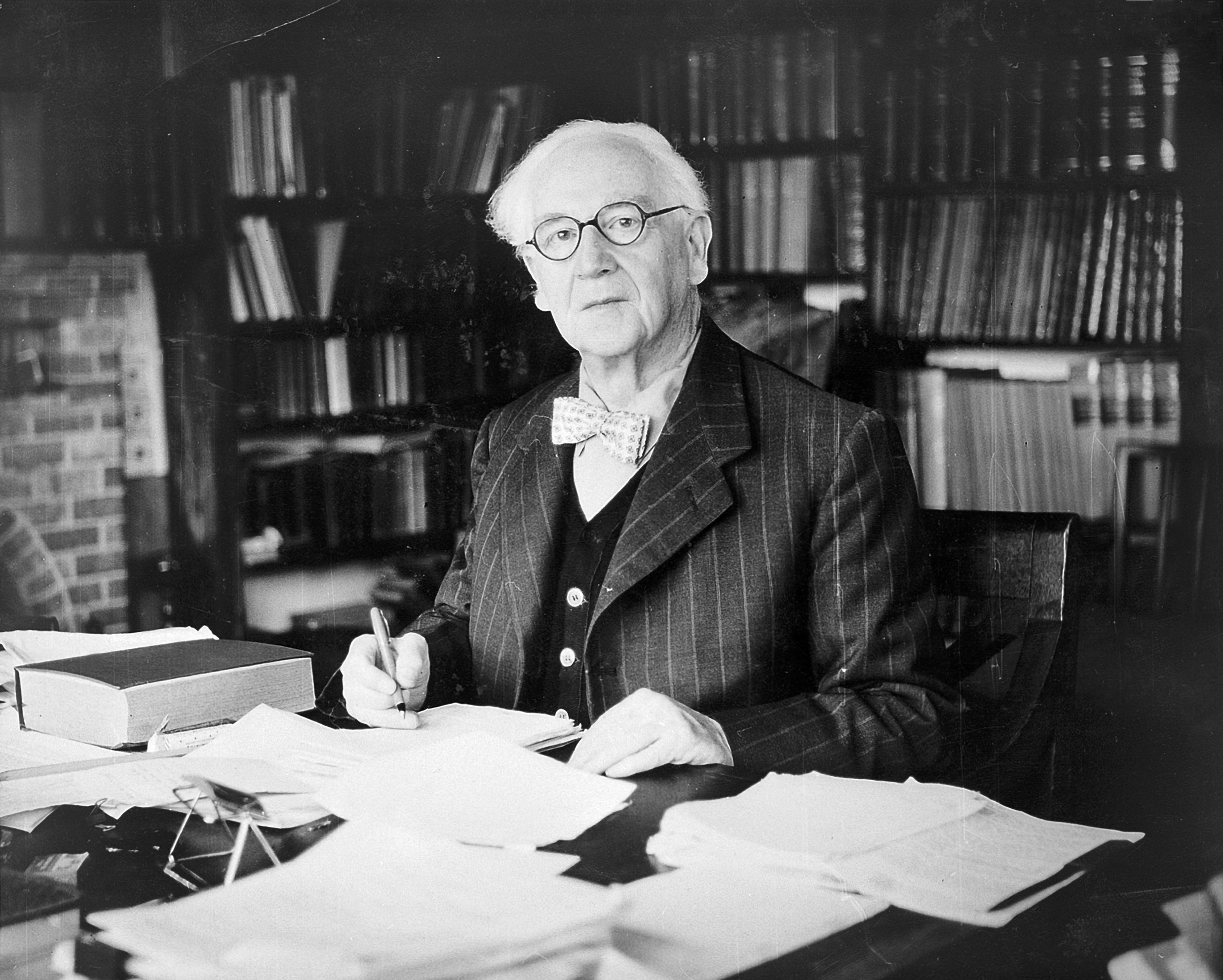
- Born: November 2, 1876; Camberwell, United Kingdom
- Died: June 10, 1960 (aged 83)
- Scientific career
- Fields: History of science

Signature
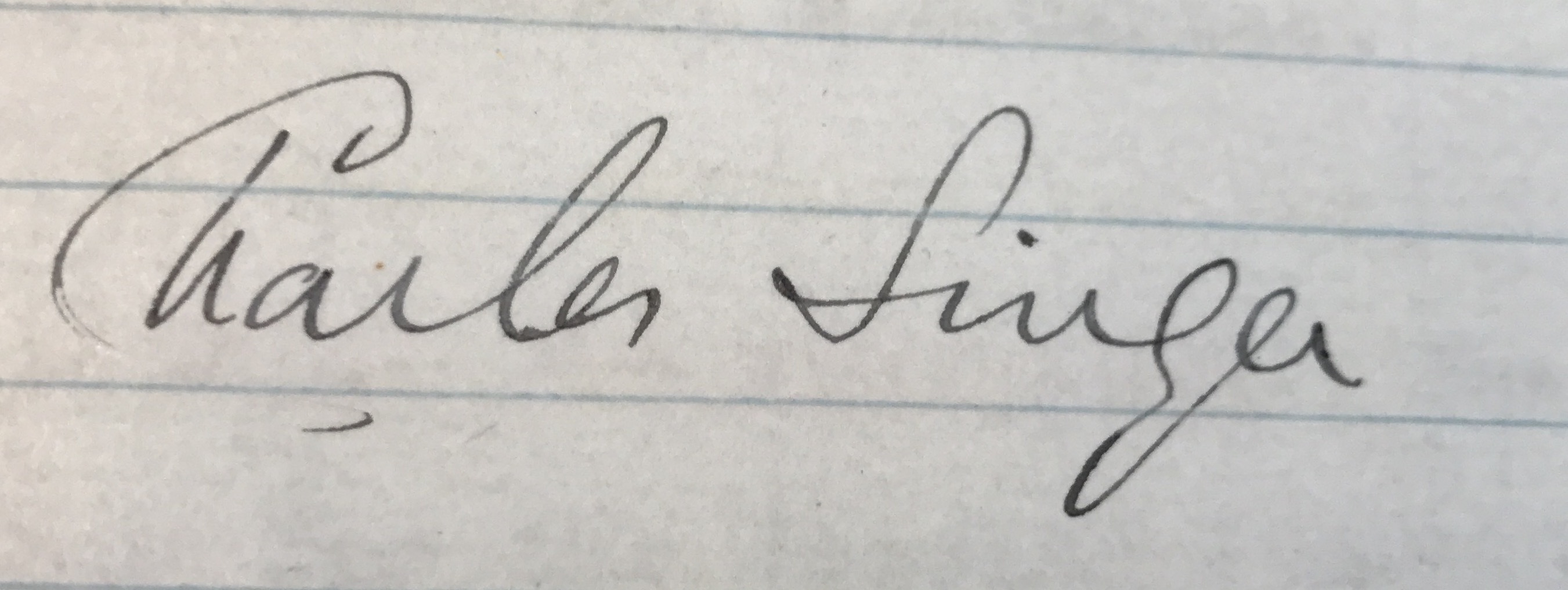

Charles Joseph Singer (2 November 1876 – 10 June 1960) was a British historian of science, technology, and medicine. He served as medical officer in the British Army.

== Biography ==
=== Early years ===
Singer was born in Camberwell in London, where his father Simeon Singer was a rabbi and Hebraist. He was educated at City of London School, University College London, and Magdalen College, Oxford (Zoology 1896–99, Honorary Fellow 1953). Trained in zoology and medicine, he qualified for medical practice in 1903. He was appointed medical officer on an expedition led by Sir John Harrington to the border region between Abyssinia and Sudan on the same day his medical qualification was announced. He returned to England and took a position at Sussex County Hospital in Brighton, and in 1907 left for Singapore. Forced to return to England on his father's death in 1908, he held positions at various hospitals in London until he moved to Oxford in 1914 to work with Sir William Osler, then Regius Professor of Medicine at the university.

=== Later years ===
Singer was married in July 1910 to Dorothea Waley Cohen, distinguished in her own right as an historian of the Medieval period. She provided valuable assistance in his publications for the remainder of his life. In the period leading up to World War I, Singer published several monographs, for which he was awarded the D.Litt. degree by Oxford.

Singer accepted a commission as medical officer in the British Army in 1916, first as a pathologist and then as part of an archaeological expedition. At war's end, he returned to Oxford to lecture on the history of biology. In 1920 he was appointed to a lectureship in the history of medicine at University College of the University of London. He became president of the History of Medicine Society at the Royal Society of Medicine in London, in 1920. His reputation extended beyond England, and in 1929 he accepted an invitation to lecture at Johns Hopkins University the following year. Johns Hopkins was also interested in offering him a permanent post, but their delay allowed the University of London to award him an honorary chair, which he accepted. By the time Johns Hopkins made their formal offer, he was satisfied with his position in London and declined their offer. The Singers spent time in Berkeley where Charles spent three months as a visiting lecturer at the University of California, after which they returned home to London. He was invited again by the University of California at Berkeley to lecture in 1932, an occasion that the Singers used to circle the globe going westward, spending about sixteen months away from England. On their return, Singer resumed his post at UCL, where he remained until his retirement in 1942. His last great publication before retirement was A Short History of Scientific Ideas to 1900.

Singer was one of the two contributors to the revised and updated version for Encyclopædia Britannica of the bulk of Thomas Clifford Allbutt's article Medicine which had been in the 11th edition. As revised for the 14th edition Singer's part was Medicine, History of (in volume 15), which followed after Sir Humphry Rolleston's Medicine, General.

Retirement was not idle for the Singers. Charles continued research into various topics and published several noteworthy books, including editing the monumental A History of Technology, which was released in five volumes between 1954 and 1958, Galen on Anatomical Procedures, and A History of Biology. Numerous articles were also published in this period, some of which remain important. He died in Par, Cornwall.

== Award and recognitions ==
Charles Singer's life was complemented by numerous awards, honors, and positions of leadership. Among these were an honorary degree (D.Sc.) from Oxford, and terms of presidency of several societies, including the British Society for the History of Science (1946–1948) and the International Union for the History of Science (1947). He was also a member of the International Society for the History of Medicine. He and his wife were co-awarded the Sarton Medal from the History of Science Society in 1956. He was elected an International Member of the American Philosophical Society in 1958.

== Partial bibliography ==
- Studies in the history and method of science (1917)
- Greek Biology and Greek Medicine, Chapters in the History of Science, Oxford: Clarendon Press, 1922.
- From Magic to Science: Essays on the Scientific Twilight (1928)
- A Short History of Medicine. New York: Oxford University Press, 1928.
- A Short History of Science to the Nineteenth Century (1941)
- As editor, A History of Technology (5 vols, between 1954 and 1958), together with Eric John Holmyard and A. R. Hall.
- Galen on Anatomical Procedures (1956)
- A History of Biology to About the Year 1900 (1959)
