= History of Lisson Grove =

Lisson Green is described as a hamlet in the Domesday Book in 1086, the edges of the settlement defined by the two current Edgware Road stations facing onto Edgware Road or Watling Street as it was previously known, one of the main Roman thoroughfares in and out of London. Occasionally referred to as Lissom Grove, originally Lisson Grove was part of the medieval manor of Lilestone which stretched as far as Hampstead. Lisson Green as a manor broke away c. 1236 with its own manor house. Paddington Green formed part of the original Lilestone estate.

== Attractions ==
One of Lisson Green village's first attractions would have been the Yorkshire Stingo, a public house probably visited by Samuel Pepys in 1666 on a visit with a flirtatious widow. Stingo was the name of a particular Yorkshire ale. On Saturdays during the 1780s, lascars, former sailors from Bengal, Yemen, Portuguese Goa employed by the East India Company left stranded and destitute in London would gather to receive a small subsidy.

== 18th century ==
Until the late 18th century the district remained essentially rural. The Austrian composer Joseph Haydn moved briefly to a farm in Lisson Grove in the spring of 1791 in order to have quiet surroundings in which to compose during his three-year stay in England. The historical painter Benjamin Haydon described a Lisson Grove dinner party with William Wordsworth, John Keats and Charles Lamb at which Lamb got drunk and berated the ‘rascally Lake poet' for calling Voltaire a dull fellow. In 1792 The Philological School was opened on the corner of Lisson Grove and Marylebone Road.

== 19th century ==
Nowadays Lisson Grove is a much improved section of West London, but for over a hundred years it was one of the capital's worst slums. The area was notorious for drinking, crime and prostitution, as well as the extreme poverty of the people and the squalor and dilapidation of the homes they lived in. Local police officers only patrolled the district in pairs, and they described the women of the area as the most drunken, violent and foul-mouthed in all London. The Grove being between Marylebone and Paddington railway stations, and on top of a busy midsection of Regent's Canal, the industrialisation of the area was swift during the 19th century transforming the area from a pastoral outpost on the north western edge of London into a crossroads for goods, cargo and passengers. In 1880 the most substantial building in the road, Portman Buildings, was erected.

Regent's Canal arrived in rural Lisson Grove in 1810 and with the construction of Eyre's Tunnel or Lisson Grove Tunnel under Aberdeen Place in 1816 and Marylebone railway station by H W Braddock for the Great Central Railway on the Portman Nursery site at the end of the century, the rural Lisson Grove was quickly engulfed by the expanding city during the 1800s.

=== The Regency Era (1811–1820): William Blake, the Shoreham Ancients and The Brazen Head public house ===
It was during the early 1800s that painters from the Royal Academy, including a coterie of various student artists calling themselves the Shoreham Ancients inspired and congregating around William Blake, began to settle in and around Lisson Grove. In 1812, John Linnell, who was to become a major patron of Blake's work, visited his friend Charles Heathcote Tatham, an architect who had built himself a majestic house in the open fields of the area of Lisson Grove between Park Road and Lisson Grove (the road) to paint the view of the surrounding fields of his garden. No. 34 Alpha Cottages is memorialised in the name of a block of flats on Ashmill Street, opposite Ranston (formerly Charles) Street and Cosway Street.

One such friend and colleague of Blake was Richard Cosway whose studio on Stafford Street was renamed as Cosway Street. "Cosway was not only a famous and fashionable painter; he was also a mesmerist and magician who practised arcana related to alchemical and cabbalistic teaching. There are reports of erotic ceremonies, the imbibing of drugs or 'elixirs', and ritual nudity. Blake was no stranger to the symbols or beliefs of a man such as Cosway – the manuscript of the poem he was writing contains many drawings of bizarre sexual imagery, including women sporting giant phalli and children engaged in erotic practices with adults."

In 1829 the Catholic church of Our Lady was built. Designed by J.J. Scoles in the new Gothic style, it was one of the first Catholic churches following the Catholic Emancipation Act. Nearby on Harewood Avenue the Convent of the Sisters of Mercy was also established as part of the Catholic Mission in St. John's Wood, serving the large Irish community attracted by the railway, canal and construction work. The same year George Shillibeer operated the first London omnibus from the Yorkshire Stingo taking passengers to Bank.

Off the southern end of Lisson Grove was Bell Street where, in 1860, Roger Evans established London's first Victorian Turkish bath at his house. A contemporary critical social commentary reads:

This is the side of Lisson Grove which is supposed to contain the decent poor; and on the other side, in the streets leading into the Edgeware Road, is a more densely crowded and even lower population. Bell Street, now famous in history as the spot where Turkish baths were first established, is the main stream of a low colony, with many tributary channels. There is no particular manufacture in the neighbourhood to call the population together; a great number are not dependent upon St. John's Wood or the Regent's Park for a living; and they come together simply because they like the houses, the rents, the inhabitants, and the general tone of living in the settlement.

— John Hollingshead, Ragged London, 1861,

Ragged London is about life in the poorest parts of the capital and Hollingshead was, of course, referring only to the first such bath in London. The first Victorian Turkish bath was actually built near Cork in Ireland in 1856, while the first in England opened in Manchester in 1857.

During the latter part of the 19th century a number of artisans and workers' flats and cottages sprang up from social housing initiatives spearheaded by Octavia Hill and the Peabody Trust. Across the road from The Green Man Inn, in 1884 Miles Building was built by the Improved Industrial Dwellings Association, facing Bell Street and Penfold Place.

=== The lost North Bank and South Bank Nash villas ===
John Nash as a director of the Regent's Canal Company formed in 1812 began building detached villas set in gardens facing onto either side of the section of the canal running parallel to Lodge Road. Ultimately destroyed in 1900 in order to make way for St John's Wood electricity sub-station (North Bank) and Lisson Grove housing estate (South Bank) the enclave of distinctive white villas bisected by the picturesque banks of the canal attracted a literary and journalist set such as George Eliot, along with East India Dock Company employees with a working interest in being near the villas along Lodge Road.

"North and South Bank, have charming, if somewhat dilapidated streets of small villas standing in their own gardens, that ran down to the water and towpath either side of the canal. Incidentally these streets, owing to the eccentricities of some of the inhabitants, and the secrecy provided by the high walls of the gardens, had acquired a somewhat sinister reputation." In 1836 the North Bank was mentioned as being associated with scandal in a local history 'at this point the East India Dock Company whose employees were fairly thick on the ground in St John's Wood'.

While Nash was developing his villas in the north east of Lisson Grove, nearest Regent's Park, Sir Edward Baker (who gave his name to Baker Street) acquired the southern part of Lisson Green in 1821 and built large blocks of flats as an extension of Marylebone. From 1825 Sir Edwin Landseer moved to No 1, St John's Wood Road on the corner of Lisson Grove in a small cottage on the site of Punker's Barn. The journalist George Augustus Henry Sala born in 1828, recalls growing up in Lisson Grove during the 1830s "when the principle public buildings were pawnbrokers, and 'leaving shops', low public houses and beershops and cheap undertakers."

=== 1885: The Eliza Armstrong Scandal ===
The fictional Eliza Doolittle was born and raised in Lisson Grove and had to pay "four and six a week for a room that wasn't fit for a pig to live in" before coming under the tutelage of Professor Henry Higgins. These characters from George Bernard Shaw's 1913 play Pygmalion are best known to modern audiences from the Lerner and Loewe 1956 musical and 1964 film adaptation of the play, entitled My Fair Lady. In 1885 the case of 13-year-old Eliza Armstrong, who was sold to a brothel keeper for £5, caused such an outcry that the law was changed and so was the name of the street where she lived (from Charles Street to Ranston Street), such was the dishonourable reputation it had gained.

=== The Fever Dens of Charles Street ===
Lisson Grove was then an area of slum housing with single room tenements. According to the Medical Officer in 1881 "Charles Street contains 33 houses and has a population of 423 all told, that the rooms are let out in tenements, nearly every room being occupied by a family".

In 1881 an editorial in the Marylebone Mercury during an outbreak of typhus fever gives a description of the area.

History repeats itself. On Thursday the 8th of February, 1877, a discussion took place in the St. Marylebone Vestry on a report brought up by the late Medical Officer of Health as to the sanitary state of certain houses in Charles street, Lisson Grove. Dr. Whitmore then reported that Nos. 1, 2, and 3, in that street were unfit for human habitation, and the surveyor stated the repairs necessary to make the tenements habitable. On the 29th September, 1881, Dr. Whitmore's successor reported to the St. Marylebone Vestry that Nos. 1, 2, and 3, and others, in Charles street, Lisson Grove, were unfit for human habitation, and the surveyor testified to the fact that he had examined some of the houses, and under the boarding in the kitchens of these dwellings, which were crowded with families, lay soil to the depth of five feet; that an outbreak of typhus fever was the result of this accumulation of filth of the worse description; and that fourteen cases of typhus had already occurred in this wretched street. Five years ago, when first reported upon, a Mr Oborn rose up as the ostensible landlord of the premises; but this year a summons is taken by the Vestry Clerk against the "owner", whose name appears to be veiled in obscurity, and a magistrate's order to clear two of the houses (Nos. 2 and 4) of the tenants has, we believe, been served upon the occupiers, although a Mr Ashby appeared in answer to the summons. But we have further evidence as to the unsanitary state of the houses in Charles street; for Mr Thomas Lloyd Lightfoot, an old and experienced – that is, if age and length of service brings experience – inspector of nuisances, told the magistrate that he had been inspecting these houses for a long time, and that more than once notice had been sent prohibiting habitation. And, notwithstanding all this, there appears to be no amendment. At last that terrible scourge, the direct offspring of foul emanations, breaks out, and the Vestry, who are responsible for the conditions necessary to preserve health of the parish, take tardy action. This something akin to locking the stable door after the steed has been stolen. For five years, as we have shown, the same condition of things has prevailed in the houses in Charles street, and the inspector of nuisances has, accepting his own statement, never ceased during that long time to report upon their filthy condition, and yet only now does the Vestry wake up from its lethargy and send its surveyor to examine and report. Thus, things having gone on from bad to worse action of some sort could no longer be delayed. Is it not a fact, may we ask, that when that dreaded scourge smallpox was at its height, Charles street was a very hotbed for propagating the epidemic? So bad at one time did this disease rage in the street, that black flags were actually hung out to warn wayfarers of the danger. This was but last summer; and yet, although those filthy emanations from the closets of the houses which have now been discovered, must have been fermenting then, we know of no action having taken to bring the owners or occupiers of the houses to book. It took a second epidemic in the same year to wake up the parish authorities to the danger of these stinking dens of disease, and now that typhus runs riot in the street, and day after day fresh cases are showing themselves, there is a fear that the work of both Medical Officer and Surveyor will be thwarted, unless the powers given by the Act of Parliament are brought to bear with full force on the parties immediately and directly concerned. The real owner of the property must be got at; a proxy will not do. The fact is, that house-grabbing propensity, which prevails in Marylebone more than in any other parish in London, is a bar to good sanitary arrangements.

It is no uncommon thing to find an owner, lessee, sub-lessee, and landlord all connected with one dwelling house. The rents are gathered in every week from the occupiers by a collector, the only man the tenant ever sees or knows, and to get at the man responsible for repairs is never even attempted by the occupier, who can only grumble to the collector and pay – and sure enough he does pay for his wretched tenement, for it is a common thing to find a family huddled together in a kitchen for which four or even five shillings a-week is demanded. This system of letting, sub-letting, and sub-sub-letting should be rooted out. So long as it exists with such tenfold force, as in Marylebone – so long as leases are so greedily run after, farewell to repairs or sanitary arrangements, house grabbers following up a rule of screwing as much as they can out of the poor, and often doing absolutely nothing to conduce cleanliness or health, comfort or convenience being entirely outside their range of consideration. And they are quite independent; for, notwithstanding all the drawbacks, these wretched dwellings are never without tenants.

The Medical Officer employed by the Board of Guardians, Dr Norman Kerr, wrote a letter to the local paper about the outbreak:

The Fever Dens

Extraordinary Revelations

Sir —Permit me to give an emphatic contradiction to the Report of the Sanitary Committee to the St. Marylebone Vestry yesterday, that at recent Interview with the Committee I stated I had no charge to bring against the Sanitary Authorities. What I did say was that I did not blame individuals, but the system pursued for the past, for the failure of the Sanitary Authority of the parish (in other words the Vestry) to prevent the epidemic of typhus fever (still spreading), and to arrest it immediately after its outbreak. There have been 41 cases in all, with six deaths up to the present. The Sanitary authority, typhus being at once the most contagious and the most easily preventable of diseases, ought to have suppressed the epidemic more than a month ago, and thus saved several lives. Had I not stepped in, at some detriment to health and private practice (keeping up only with the aid of professional assistance, constant Turkish baths, extra diet, and the non-use of stimulants) and discharged the duty the Vestry neglected, the cases would have numbered hundreds, and the deaths at least twenties. Typhus cannot survive fresh air, and the removal excellent hygienic conditions of Homerton Fever Hospital has saved probably 17 lives that would have been lost had the patients remained in their insanitary homes. Of the cases so removed a number ought to have been attended to by the Vestry. I had nothing to do with these, but had not the heart to see them die without a chance of life. The paupers are the care of the Guardians, and right well do these gentlemen fulfil their trust. But no one seems to care whether struggling ratepayers, who are not paupers, live or die. In March last from a non-pauper case of smallpox, which was not removed by the Vestry, 11 cases followed in Charles-street. I also told the Committee that their professed disinfection was but an outside cleaning of the cup and platter, and was a delusion and a snare. Where attempted it was practically valueless; and I instanced 2 recent cases where no attempt was made. One was a man who was allowed to sleep on the infected bed from which a case had been sent the week before. The other was the poor woman on whom the inquest was held, and who slept and died in the disinfected bed from which her child had been taken seven days previously.

About nineteen years ago there was an outbreak of Typhus Fever in the same street and neighbourhood, when the relieving officer (then called Inspector) and the district medical officer caught the disease and died. The sanitary authorities ought to have at once remedied the insanitation; but, after repeated subsequent epidemics of contagious diseases, the sewerage from the houses is still semi stagnant and defective, and one house is actually built over a privy, which latter ventilates between the boards into the inhabited room above. I cast no reflection on my friend. Dr. Blyth and his staff, or even on the Vestry. The traditional conservatism of the ancien regime has been too much for them; but I venture to appeal to the latter intelligent and spirited body to immediately re-organise their system, and systematically ascertain the sanitary condition of the whole parish. By so they will earn the respect and gratitude of the community.

Action was then taken by the Vestry.

Now that the Vestry have got at the root of the matter, there is every probability of the scandalous state of things sanitary which has prevailed in Charles Street, Lisson Grove, for so long a time being remedied. Ground landlord, freeholder, leaseholder, and sub-leaseholder, have, after much research, been traced; and from the fat knight who owns the land on which the wretched tenements are built and the lean attorney and his clients who hold the freeholds and the leases, something more than promises have been made that sweeping changes will be at once carried out. For several of the houses there is not a shadow of doubt, but that to reform them off the face of the earth is the only remedy, and there is now every hope that the Vestry of Marylebone, in the exercise of power invested in them by Act of Parliament, will demand that those death-dealing dens be razed to the ground and habitable dwellings be erected in their stead. There is one thing in which special attention should be directed in the re-erection of these houses – that is, the foundations on which they are built, and for the best of reasons. Some quarter of a century ago, when open cesspools were prohibited and London landlords were compelled by law to introduce other conveniences into their houses, to save expense these open cesspools were frequently bricked over when filled with soil of the filthiest description. This soil, in many instances five or six feet deep, has now and again been found under Marylebone houses when occasion arose to examine the foundations and repair drains. It is not so very long ago since, in a street close to Charles Street, one of these yawning gulphs of filth was discovered which actually ran across the backyards of five houses, had sapped the foundations of all five, and when emptied was found to contain twenty cartloads of foul emanations, which had been fermenting close to these dwellings for over a score of years. And those covered up cesspools, we are told, are not restricted to the poor streets of the parish, but lie contiguous to the best houses in the finest streets and squares. May not the accumulation of faecal matter found under the condemned houses of in Charles Street be the remains of old cesspools, which instead of being emptied and filled up with earth and rubbish when the law to abolish such abominable nuisances came into force, were, to save the landlord's pocket, simply bricked over, their contents gradually working into the soil underlying the floors of the houses? And is it not probable that every typhus den in Charles Street has a bricked up cesspool close to it? Our Medical Officer of Health is new to London, and he may not be aware that a quarter of a century ago the cesspools and night cart were essentials of our civilisation; it is for this reason that we direct his attention to what might be the primary cause of the pestilence which – as scarlatina, smallpox, and typhus – has for years been familiar to Charles Street and neighbourhood. "Primary causes" are often discussed in the "Chronicles of the Health of St. Marylebone;" we are convinced that an investigation such as we have pointed out will lay bare a set of primary causes which will astonish sanitarians, and lead up to the conclusion that the real cause of these epidemics is not so much due to dilapidated and overcrowded houses as to the air which is daily and nightly breathed, the product of the foul odours of stored up filth.

=== Improvements ===
It was not until 1898 that major changes were recommended.

LISSON GROVE SLUMS TO BE DEMOLISHED

Healthy dwellings for the working classes to be erected

An important and interesting discussion took place at last week's meeting of the Marylebone Vestry; when the Sanitary Committee brought forward a recommendation advising the Vestry to take drastic steps with regard to certain insanitary and unhealthy dwellings in the Lisson Grove district. The recommendation was follows:- That it appears to the committee the bad conditions and sanitary defects of the buildings in Nightingale street, Stamford street (excepting the school), are of such a nature that it is necessary to demolish the said buildings, and to construct on the site, suitable dwellings for the working classes, and that the area is too small to be dealt with under part one of the Housing of the Working Classes Act, and therefore, the committee recommend the Vestry to direct that a scheme be prepared for the improvement of the said area.

Dr Snape, in moving the adoption of the recommendation, said the matter had come before the Sanitary Committee, on the reference by the Vestry, of a report from the Medical Officer of Health. Dr Snape then proceeded to read extracts from the report; and said that although the landlords who owned most of the houses had been summoned, and he had persistently refrained from putting his property in order. The Sanitary Committee had visited the place and did not think that the Medical Officer had exaggerated the condition of the houses.

In 1890 construction began on Marylebone Railway, completing almost a decade later in 1899. In 1894 Landseer's house was destroyed to make way for railway artisan homes. Penfold Street was to become dominated by the Great Central Goods Depot Yard, along which a number of public houses sprang up: the "Lord Frampton" (now residential flats), the "Richmond Arms" and "The Crown Hotel" (known as Crocker's Folly since 1987). In 1886–96 the newly named Ranston Street saw a number of Almond & St Botolphs Cottages (Nos. 14–19) built under the initiative of social reformer Octavia Hill. As a strong advocate of small scale housing, cottages and mixed developments, she described these cottages as an experimental form of 'compound housing' e.g. maisonettes in her 1897 Letter to Fellow Workers.

In 1897, local entrepreneur Frank Crocker, who also owned "The Volunteer" in Kilburn, had architect C. H. Worley of Welbeck Street draw up plans for an ornately eclectic public house "The Crown Hotel", to be renamed "Crocker's Folly" from 1987, on the corner of Aberdeen Place and Cunningham Place, housing several Saloon bars on the ground floor with a hotel, dining rooms and a concert room on the floors above. Grade II* listed, it is currently under refurbishment as at September 2013.

== 20th century ==
In 1903 the Home for Female Orphans was on the corner of Lisson Grove and St John's Wood Road. In November 1906 Henry Sylvester Williams (b.1867 – d.1911), a Trinidadian lawyer and anti-slavery and civil rights campaigner, was elected to the St Marylebone Borough Council for Church Street Ward as the first black councillor in what is now the City of Westminster. A green plaque at 38 Church Street marks where Williams lived from 1906 to 1908. Edgware Road (Bakerloo line) underground station opened in 1907 in a narrow parade of shops, with exits onto Edgware Road and Bell Street.

Following World War One, Lloyd George announced "homes fit for heroes", leading to a housing boom from which Lisson Grove was to benefit. In 1924, Fisherton Street estate was completed by St Marylebone Council with seven apartment blocks in red-brick neo-Georgian style with high mansard roofs grouped around two courtyards. Noted for their innovation as some of the first social housing to include an indoor bathroom and toilet, in 1990 the estate was defined as the Fisherton Street Conservation Area The blocks were named mostly for the notable former residents of Lisson Grove and its surrounding areas, which drew Victorian landscape painters, sculptors, portraitists and architects:

- Lilestone: Named in reference to the medieval manor stretching to Hampstead before Lisson Grove became a separate manor in the 13th century
- Huxley: Thomas Henry Huxley the self-taught biologist and ardent Charles Darwin supporter was resident at 41 North Bank during the 1850s.
- Gibbons: Grinling Gibbons (1648–1721) a master carver who worked on St Pauls
- Landseer: Sir Edwin Landseer (famous for sculpting the lions in Trafalgar Square)
- Capland:
- Frith: For sculptor William Silver Frith (1850–1924)
- Orchardson: For painter Sir William Quiller Orchardson (1832–1910)
- Dicksee: For Sir Francis Dicksee, a noted Victorian painter
- Eastlake: For Charles Eastlake (1836–1906) British architect and furniture designer
- Tadema: For Sir Lawrence Alma-Tadema
- Poynter: For Sir Edward Poynter (1836–1919)
- Stanfield: George Clarkson Stanfield and his son, both artists.
- Frampton: George Frampton the sculptor had lived nearby at Carlton Hill from 1910 and may have given his name to Frampton Street and Frampton House
- Wyatt: Matthew Cote Wyatt who lived at Dudley Grove House, Paddington

After the First World War dining rooms at 35 Lisson Grove became a fish bar, called the Sea Shell from 1964. Now on the corner of Shroton Street, the restaurant is one of London's most highly rated fish and chip shops.

In 1960 the first Labour Exchange was established on Lisson Grove to much fanfare, and later featured in punk music history as the place where Joe Strummer was to meet fellow Clash members Mick Jones and Paul Simonon while signing on.
