= Frank Crocker =

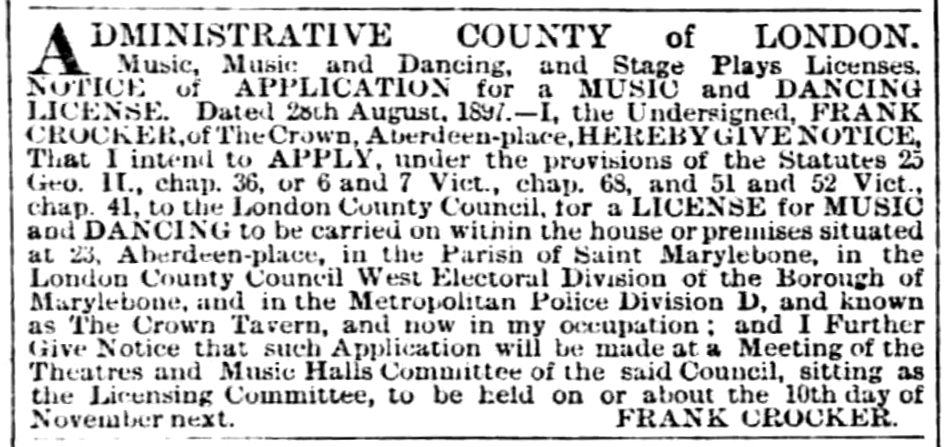
Crocker's notice of an application for a music and dancing licence, The Morning Post, London 1897.

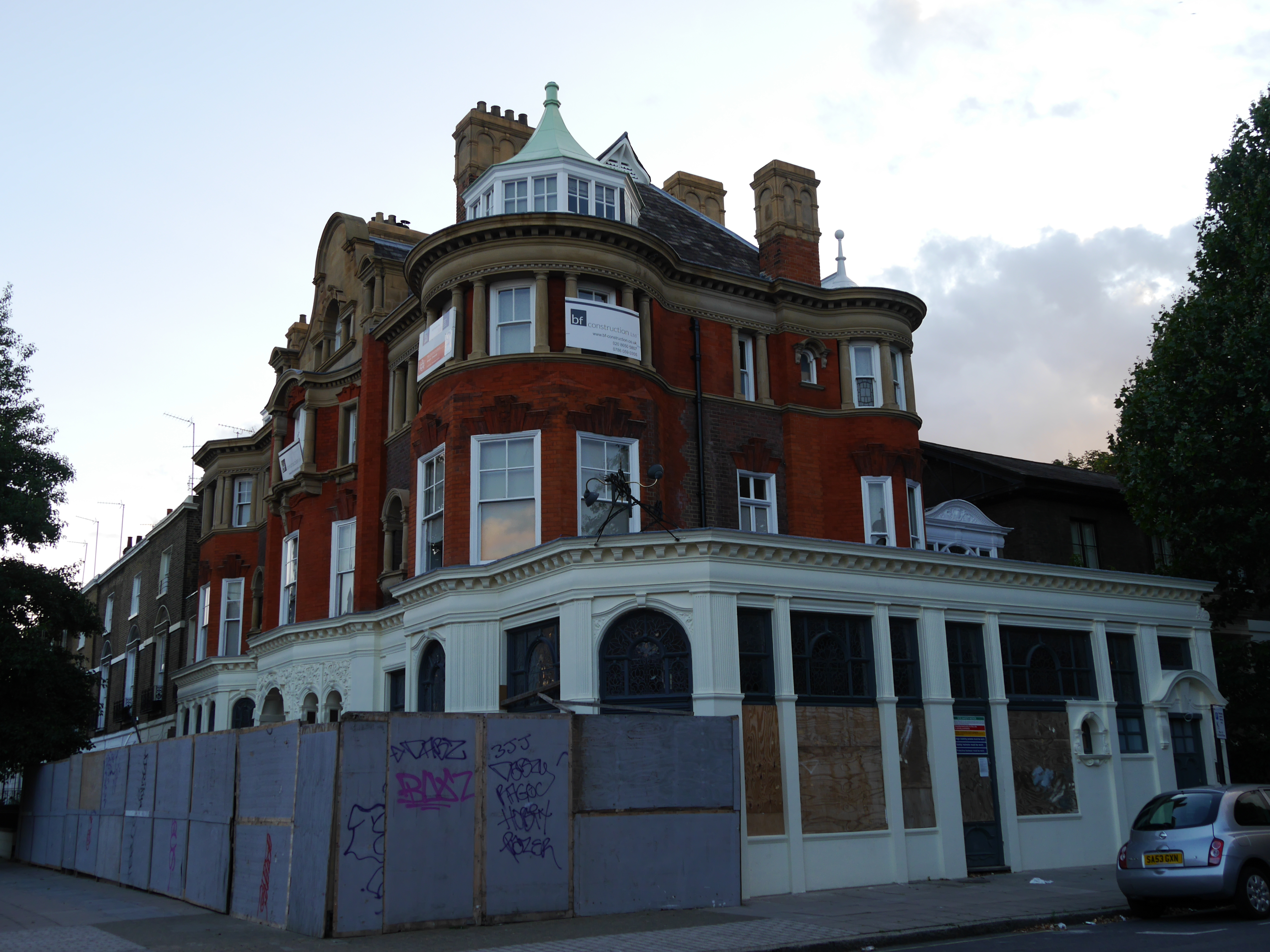
Crocker's Folly, 2014

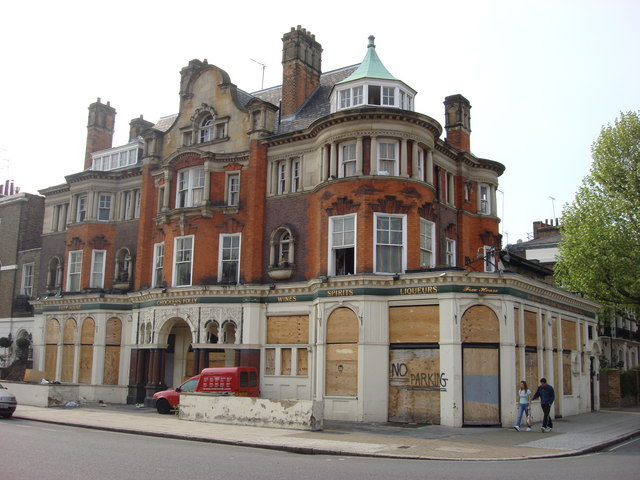
Crocker's Folly, boarded up in 2007.

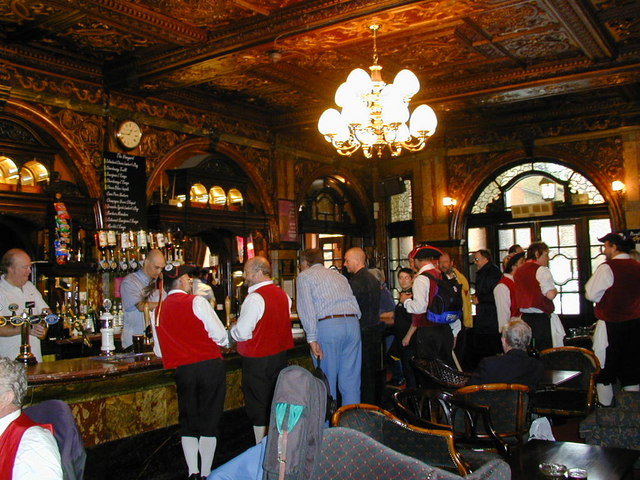
The interior, 2001.

Frank Crocker (bapt. 27 March 1863 – 24 October 1904) was a British publican and the owner of the Crown Hotel in St John's Wood, London, which was renamed Crocker's Folly in 1987 in his honour.

== Biography ==
Crocker was born in Newton Abbot, Devon, to Francis Crocker, an innkeeper, and Louisa Handford Crocker.

The family initially moved to Exeter, where his father ran the "Dolphin Inn" and later relocated to London, where his father purchased the "Volunteer" pub in Kilburn. Before joining his father at the Volunteer, Frank Crocker worked as a furniture salesman. He eventually took ownership of the Volunteer. In 1893, he married Agnes Cooper.

Crocker was a popular and active member of the community. He was active in the Paddington and Marylebone Victuallers' Trade Protection Society and heavily lobbied for a road and footbridge between Aberdeen Place and Salisbury Street. He was also an active freemason and a member of the Paddington Cycling Club, whose headquarters met at his home. He died from complications of heart disease and bronchitis, aged 41, after six months of illness. His funeral brought out hundreds of mourners to see his cortège procession, which was led with a carriage just for his flowers, followed by his coffin carriage and 19 private carriages taking mourners to the cemetery.

His obituary in the Kilburn Times described the source of his popularity: "He was of a very affable and sociable disposition and geniality, and his genuine kind-heartedness gained him a host of friends.... To the poor he was always most kind, and his many charitable deeds will be remembered and sadly missed."

== Crocker's Folly ==
Crocker's Folly is a Grade II* listed public house at 23-24 Aberdeen Place, St John's Wood, London. It was built in 1898, in a Northern Renaissance style, and was previously called "The Crown". Brandwood and Jephcote describe it as "a truly magnificent pub-cum-hotel" with "superb fittings", including extensive use of marble. The architect was Charles Worley.

In 1987, the pub's name was changed to Crocker's Folly. An urban legend spread that Frank Crocker built the pub to serve the new terminus of the Great Central Railway, but when the terminus was actually built, it was over half a mile away at Marylebone Station, leading to Crocker's ruin, despair and eventual suicide. In reality, Crocker died of natural causes after a long period of illness. It has been claimed that Crocker's ghost haunts the pub.
