= Norman Kerr =

Scottish physician, social reformer and temperance activist

Norman Kerr FLS
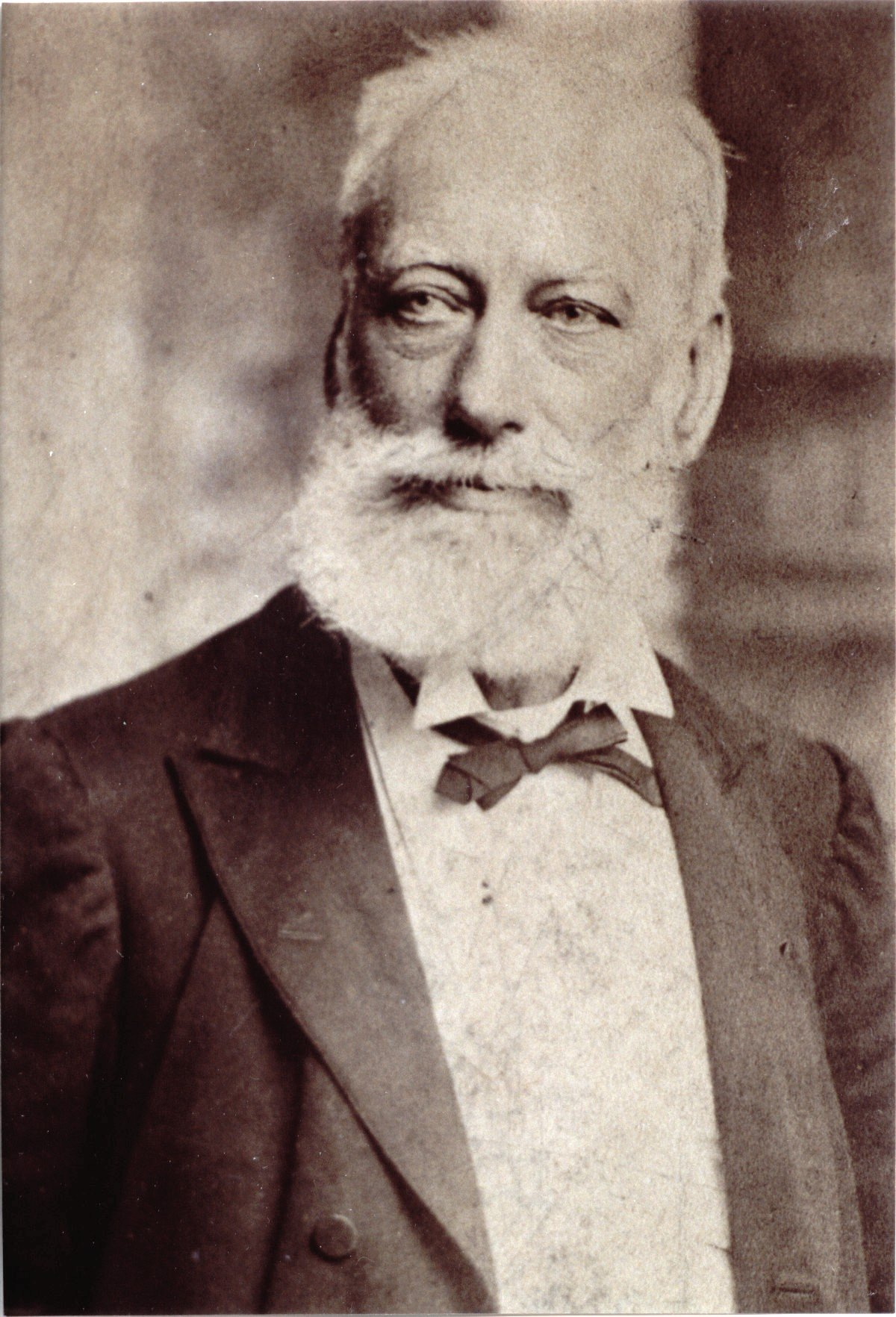
- Born: 17 May 1834; Glasgow, Scotland
- Died: 30 May 1899 (aged 65); Hastings, England
- Education: University of Glasgow (M.D. and C.M., 1861)
- Occupations: Physician, activist
- Known for: Temperance activism

Norman Shanks Kerr FLS (17 May 1834 – 30 May 1899) was a Scottish physician and social reformer who is remembered for his work in the British temperance movement. He originated the Total Abstinence Society and was founder and first president of the Society for the Study and Cure of Inebriety which was founded in 1884.

In his writings he insisted on regarding inebriety as a disease and not a vice: "a disease of the nervous system allied to insanity", an "abnormal condition, in which morbid cravings and impulses to intoxication are apt to be developed in such force as to overpower the moral resistance and control."

I have not attempted to dogmatize on disputed points as to whether inebriety is a sin, a vice, a crime, or a disease. In my humble judgment, it is sometimes all four, but oftener a disease than anything else, and even when anything else, generally a disease as well. (Inaugural address, 1884).

His influential textbook on "Inebriety or Narcomania" was first published in 1888 and went through three editions. In the first edition he coined the term "narcomania" to refer to the disease of inebriety. Note that while 'inebriate' originally described a person intoxicated with alcohol, it later came to include other intoxicating drugs, especially narcotics, such as opium, chlorodyne, ether, chloral, chloroform or cocaine.

He was elected a Fellow of the Linnean Society in 1873 and was also a member of the Obstetrical and Medical Societies of London, the Harveian Society and British Medical Association, being elected to the General Council for the Metropolitan branch.

== Early life and education ==
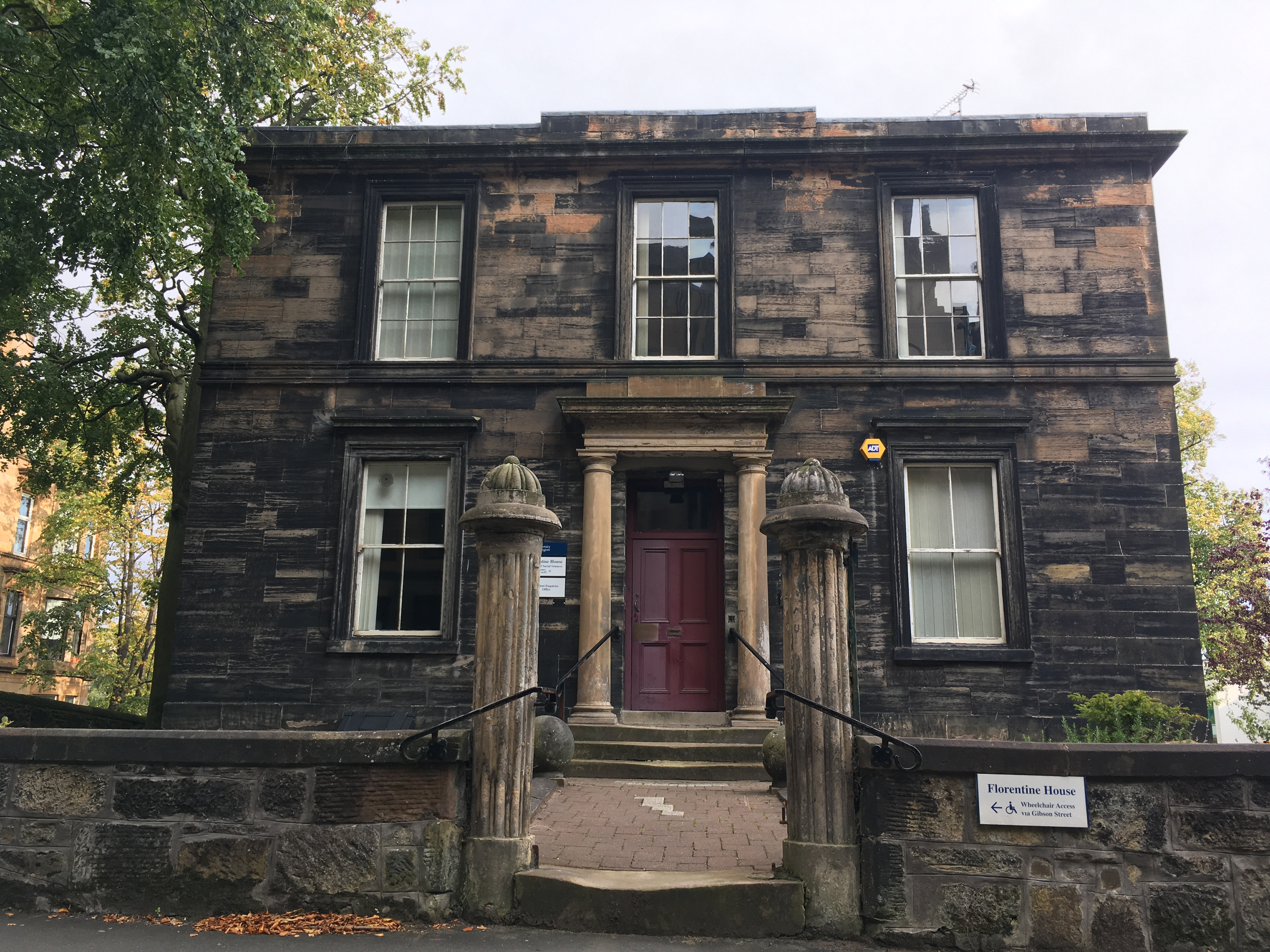
Florentine House, 53 Hillhead Street

Norman Shanks Kerr was born at Morrison's Court, Argyle Street, Glasgow, Scotland on 17 May 1834, the eldest son of Alexander Kerr (1800–1855) and Helen (née Shanks) Kerr (1813–1848). His father, Alexander, was a merchant and ship owner who lived at Florentine Bank House, Hillhead.

Norman Kerr studied at the Western Academy and the High School, then worked as a journalist on the Glasgow Mail before entering University, graduating from the University of Glasgow in 1861 as Doctor of Medicine (M.D.) and Master of Surgery (C.M.).

Even from these student days he was interested in the study of alcoholism; he was a member of the temperance Coffee Tavern Company of Glasgow and organised the first Total Abstinence Society for students in 1857. In 1853 he attended the inaugural meeting of the United Kingdom Alliance at Manchester and he was the first secretary of the Glasgow Abstainers' Union. In 1858 he was secretary for the non-political "The Independent Union" of students.

== Career ==
After graduation he was resident surgeon at the Lock Hospital, Glasgow, and then employed as a surgeon on the Montreal Ocean Steamship Company for about nine years. In 1863 he gave an account of a tour in America, including Portland, New York, and other large towns, "and referred at some length to the great question of slavery". He is reported to have travelled in Canada and the United States in this time and to have visited Portland in 1864.

Dr Crothers notes in the first Norman Kerr lecture, "As a surgeon on shipboard he was known as a temperance doctor, and while not obtrusive or dogmatic in his views, he discouraged the use of spirits as a beverage."

He was then in practice in Markyate, Hertfordshire, being appointed Markyate Medical Officer in 1871, until he resigned in 1875. He took part in a local meeting in 1872 by the United Kingdom Alliance supporting Sir Wilfred Lawson's Permissive Prohibitory Bill.

He was elected a Fellow of the Linnean Society in 1873 with an interest in botany. In 1872 he wrote supporting the case for Eozoon canadense being recognised as a fossil.

=== Marylebone ===
From 1874, he was employed as the Medical Officer of Health for Marylebone (Christ Church District) by the Board of guardians. The Christ Church District included Lisson Grove, an area of slum housing with single room tenements. In 1881 the outbreak of Typhus prompted Dr Norman Kerr to write a letter to the Vestry of St Marylebone.

"Now that the outbreak of typhus fever in the parish, which in all probability we have transferred to the East of London (where in an aggravated form is now raging), it is apparently abating in Marylebone (after, for the second time, laying aside a relieving and a medical officer), permit me to ask your attention to the pressing need for prompt and effectual measures to render such an outbreak impossible for the future. I do not mean to lull you into false security by saying that the epidemic has entirely ceased. It has not, but I trust that it is dying out. Typhus can be prevented, and it can be suppressed, it being one of the most contagious and the most easily prevented of diseases. Let me entreat you, first, to reorganise your sanitary system, so that, if unhappily any future outbreak should occur, that it may be speedily arrested. To be in a position to accomplish this you can put into force your legal powers to secure the proper isolation, and, if necessary, removal of non-pauper cases. You can also exert your legal powers to see that there is proper disinfection, and, where that is needed, to carry out the disinfection by your own disinfector. To prevent another outbreak, which may injure the health, trade, and reputation of the locality even more than the epidemic, now, let us hope, fading away, you can in a considerable degree remove the insanitary conditions which have hitherto fostered the disease. To condemn five houses reported in the press as Nos. 1,2,3,4 and 12 Charles-street, is a measure totally inadequate to meet the necessities of the case. In the same street is a room built over a privy, which latter ventilates into the apartment above. In yet another house three typhus cases were removed from the kitchen. The sewage, too, is defective. In many other streets there is a call for a thorough-going sanitary revolution. I know how your efforts are impeded by halting legislation, and by the lack of compulsory notificationof infectious diseases; and I cannot help expressing a hope that the recent epidemic will yet prove to have been a blessing in disguise, by inciting your honourable board to rise to the dignity of the occasion, and institute a searching inquiry into your sanitary system and into the sanitary state of the whole parish, with a view to the safety of the inhabitants and the future immunity of St. Marylebone from the recurrence of so insidious and dangerous an epidemic. The urgency of the case must be my excuse for thus trespassing on your courtesy and forbearance."

In a letter to the local paper he wrote "The Sanitary authority, typhus being at once the most contagious and the most preventable of diseases, ought to have suppressed the epidemic more than a month ago, and thus saved several lives. Had I not stepped in, at some detriment to health and private practice (keeping up only with the aid of professional assistance, constant Turkish baths, extra diet, and the non-use of stimulants) and discharged the duty the Vestry neglected, the cases would have numbered hundreds, and the deaths at least twenties."

The Victorian Turkish bath he visited is probably the one at 5 Bell Street, on the corner with Lisson Grove, established in 1860, the first in London. (Note: This first London establishment, although small, was extremely influential and Dr Kerr was not the only physician to use it. Dr R H Goolden described it in The Lancet (26 January 1861) as part of his successful campaign to persuade his colleagues to agree to the installation of a Turkish bath at St Thomas's Hospital.) His other health precaution was a good square meal before going where infectious disease existed. Dr Kerr also believed that "smoke being retained in the mouth has … a kind of disinfecting filter through which the germs have to pass, and some of them are certainly destroyed, or at least deprived of their vitality". "There might be exceptions, he said. If a person could not stand smoking well, then it might depress his heart's action, and so lessen the resisting power to throw off the infectious germs. On broad, general grounds, however, he was decidedly of opinion that tobacco smoking, other things being equal, did give anyone exposed to infection a considerable amount of immunity. Dr. Kerr himself in attending cases of cholera always made a point of smoking." He wrote on the subject of cholera and having had cholera himself.

Dr Kerr's health concerns were well founded since infectious diseases were common and in a previous outbreak nineteen years earlier the Relieving Officer and District Medical Officer both caught typhus and died. In this case he was able to joke about it, as reported by the Marylebone Mercury.

Dr Norman Kerr in Charles Street

A free entertainment, comprising songs, choruses, recitations, and addresses, was given in Perseverance Hall, Charles street, Lisson Grove, on Thursday evening, by J.M.R. Todd, Esq., and the Holy Trinity (Kilburn) Church Temperance Choir. A young lady from the same church kindly presided at the pianoforte. The programme was enthusiastically received by the crowded audience.

Dr. Norman Kerr, who occupied the chair, said that to escape an attack of the recent fashionable complaint of the neighbourhood (laughter) he had been ordered away at an hour's notice, and it was not till he got to France that the breezes of the English Channel had blown away all the threatening and suspicious symptoms. But he was delighted at again finding himself in Charles-street, where he had spent so much of his time of late (laughter); for he found the atmosphere greatly improved by the energetic and thoroughgoing exertions of the Sanitary Authority and their staff (hear). He was thankful to find that during his absence the Vestry of Marylebone had resolved to institute a searching inquiry into the sanitary state of the parish and he had great hope that such measures would be adopted as would prevent any alarming epidemics for the future, and thus bring back to the neighbourhood the people and the trade that had been of late kept away by fear of contagion. He did not think there was any risk now, and he was satisfied they night all enjoy the excellent entertainment of their good friends from Kilburn without any alloy of doubt or timidity (applause). There was an evil, however, which had existed there far longer than had the epidemics of physical disease – the prevailing evil of drinking (hear). Yet no notice was taken of this deadly plague which, to his personal knowledge, had killed many of the inhabitants, and which still held down as many innocent helpless little children in the slough of starvation and misery.

He went on to be one of the founders in 1892 of the Church Sanitary Association with the aims of ensuring to everyone pure air, pure water, a wholesome dwelling, and surroundings safeguarded from preventable diseases.

=== Temperance movement ===
He promoted the temperance movement as a speaker and through his writings. After moving to London he joined the Church of England Temperance Society, speaking at their annual conference, and supported the British Women's Temperance Association.

He was a supporter of the Society for Promoting Legislation for the Control and Cure of Habitual Drunkards, which had been founded in 1876, and in 1877 read a paper on the treatment of habitual drunkards in the Psychological Section of a general meeting of the British Medical Association at Manchester. The Society drafted a bill to provide for one year detention of voluntary and criminal drunkards, with magistrates having the power to commit frequent offenders. This was withdrawn because of opposition to control by the prison inspectorate of the reformatories. The Habitual Drunkards Act 1879 (42 & 43 Vict. c. 19) was passed including protecting the drunkards' rights and his ability to pay for treatment. A habitual drunkard was defined as someone who "cannot be certified as a lunatic, but who due to habitual intemperate drinking is dangerous to him or herself or incapable of managing their affairs". They could apply to two magistrates to voluntarily sign away their freedom and be sent to a Licensed Retreat for up to one year, but had to pay the charges themselves. The requirement to pay charges and the lack of compulsory detention for non-criminals was disappointing for the Society. When the British Medical Association created the Inebriates Legislation Committee to promote further legislation he was made the chairman. The committee drafted the Habitual Drunkards Act Amendment Bill (1888).

He was the Honorary Consulting Physician at the Dalrymple House for Inebriates, Rickmansworth, which had been founded in 1884 under the Inebriates Acts of 1879–99 for the clinical study and treatment of inebriety.

He promoted the use of Coffee Taverns and Coffee Music Halls as a temperance alternative and was a director of the Coffee Taverns Company and the Coffee Music Halls Company. In 1884 he chaired the informal meeting to celebrate Edward Payson Weston's temperance walk of 5000 miles in 100 days, excluding Sundays, at the Royal Victoria Coffee Hall, Lambeth.

He presided at the Colonial and International Congress on Inebriety held at Westminster Town Hall (1887). He was also corresponding secretary of the American Association for the cure of Inebriates, and corresponding member of the Medical Legislation Society, New York.

==== Alcohol in medicine ====
Alcohol was then widely used in medicine. "Dr. Norman Kerr, a well-known physician of England, says, that during a ten years' residence in America, he found people unwilling to pay him as much for his services as they were willing to pay one who prescribed alcoholics. Even those who were abstainers from liquors as beverages distrusted him for not using these things as medicines."

He opposed the medical use of alcohol writing

"My own experience of thirty-four years in the practice of my profession has taught me that in nearly all cases and kinds of disease the medical use of alcohol is unnecessary, and in a large number of instances is prejudicial and even dangerous. Having given an intoxicant, in strictly definite and guarded doses, probably on the whole only about once in 3,000 cases (then usually when nothing else was available in an emergency), and having had most varieties of disease to contend with, my death-rate and duration of illness have been quite as low as my neighbors. The experience of the London Temperance Hospital and other similar institutions, the current reports of that hospital being now reliable scientific records, amply support this experience."

==== Testimonial ====
In 1879 he presided at the medical temperance breakfast to the president, officers and members of the British Medical Association at Cork, and carried the dinner ticket exclusive of wine at the British Medical Association meeting at Cambridge (1880).

A testimonial was held for him in 1880 by members of the temperance movement at the Medical Society of London, which included a carriage, portraits, and an illuminated address.

TESTIMONIAL TO DR NORMAN KERR
Yesterday afternoon, in the rooms of the Medical Society, London, a testimonial was presented to Mr Norman S. Kerr, M.D., F.LS., in consideration of his eminent services in the cause of temperance and social reform. Dr B. W. Richardson presided, and there was a considerable attendance of Dr Kerr's friends and acquaintances. The testimonial consisted of a carriage and harness, crayon portraits of Dr and Mrs Kerr, and an illuminated address. Dr Richardson, in presenting the testimonial, said that in these days of giving and taking testimonials the process was thought almost as little of as that of giving and taking in marriage. This was not quite fair to every such occasion. There were happy marriages not a few, and there were happy occasions, of which this was one, for the giving and taking of testimonials. In the present instance the gift to Dr Norman Kerr had this charm and sanction shout it, that it was given from the hearts of those who offered it and it had been won by the hearty service of him who received it. That presentation was in honour and in recognition of good and honest and long-continued work – first, to the profession to which Dr Kerr belonged, and to which in all its varied interests he was so devotedly attached; secondly to the many, rich and poor, who came under his care, and who alike wished to express their sincere admiration; thirdly, to one great and ever-widening cause, the greatest cause in our- modern civilisation, the cause of freedom from intemperance, the liberty of the abject; and lastly, his aid to every social undertaking that came within his range, and that forwarded what had been well I called the "Immutable Morality" of the human race. We hope, Dr Richardson continued, that the form of this recognition will be considered in all senses appropriate. The memorial which has been read tells the story. The portraits of Dr Kerr and of his beloved wife, most admirably executed by Mr Hartshorn, will, it is earnestly wished, long live in the family of recipients as witnesses, such is their fidelity, living and speaking witnesses, of this day's testimony; while the carriage which is the accompaniment will, it is equally hoped, be for many and many years the safe bearer of Dr Kerr in his journeys of usefulness. Dr Kerr might be assured that with these proofs neither their esteem nor their affection would be in the least dimmed. Out of the fulness of their hearts they simply spoke their esteem and affection with the wish that he might go on his way convinced and convincing that he had honestly won and deserved both. (Applause.)
Dr Norman Kerr, in replying, said had difficulty in finding words to express his sense of the honour done him by these proceedings. If he had done anything to deserve these gifts, if he had done anything to deserve such recognition by his, friends, he had yet done nothing more than his simple duty as a citizen. There seemed to be a prevalent idea that doctors ought to be a separate lot of people, and that they ought to have nothing to do with human action or human sympathy. That was not his opinion. Few men had better opportunities of ascertaining the needs and wants of humanity than the members of the medical profession, and for his part he held that whenever they found a suffering sinner's soul they had a right and a duty to come to its assistance. It was this feeling that had led him to take part in various social movements, such as the establishment of coffee taverns and temperance music halls, and in fact any means which rendered the pursuit of virtue less difficult to those who had many temptations in their path.

==== Wine : scriptural and ecclesiastical ====
"Wines: scriptural and ecclesiastical" (dedicated to the Archbishop of Canterbury), in which he described the use of unfermented wine for communion, was published following a meeting held in the Chapter House of St Paul's Cathedral in November 1881 by the Church Homiletical Society. A report of one of his lectures on the subject at the Walmer Castle Coffee Tavern recorded that

"Dr. Kerr contended, from the evidence of tradition, history and fact, that "wine" was a generic word to indicate both the unfermented and the fermented, and that both kinds had been used by the ancients and by the moderns. The lecturer also pointed out the danger to reformed drunkards of intoxicating wine at communion, and showed that unintoxicating wine had at all periods of ecclesiastical history been held to be wine for the purpose of the sacrament. Two bishops had sanctioned its use, and it was rapidly being adopted in Established and other churches. The lecture was illustrated by diagrams of Hebrew and Greek words and ancient descriptions of unintoxicating wine, by a forest of bottles each containing a different variety of pure unfermented juice of the grape from various parts of Europe, Asia, Africa, and America, by the analysis of various Tent wines, and by the entire process of manufacture of unfermented wine from the crushing of the cluster to the bottling of the wine. Most of those present remained after the lecture to taste the wines, especially those from Madeira, Oporto, and Naples."

==== Society for the Study and Cure of Inebriety ====
In 1884, in response to the inadequacy of the Habitual Drunkards Act 1879 (42 & 43 Vict. c. 19), he founded the Society for the Study and Cure of Inebriety and was the first president.

He went on to edit and later supervise the Proceedings of the Society until his death.

We confidently believe that we will succeed in acquiring a more exact acquaintance with the phenomena, causation, and conditions of cure of inebriety, by engaging in the study of this intractable disease with the same strictly scientific method with which we enter upon the study of other forms of disease.

What is inebriety? We may define it as a diseased state of the brain and nerve centres, characterised by an irresistible impulse to indulge in intoxicating liquors or other narcotics for the relief which these afford, at any peril. This ungovernable, uncontrollable, over-powering impulse may hurry on the diseased dipsomaniac to his destruction, even when he has no relish for the toxic agent, but on the contrary loathes and detests it.

This is a Society for the study and cure of inebriety. Our object is to investigate, by strictly scientific methods, the various causes, and to educate the professional and public mind to knowledge of those causes, and to recognition of the physical aspect of habitual intemperance. Permitting no preconceived opinions to stand in the way of our research, allowing no foregone conclusions or sentiments to bias our judgment, we propose, without prejudice or passion, deliberately and persistently to pursue our modest inquiry, in the earnest hope and confident anticipation that in the solution of the dark and perplexing drink problem we, or our successors, may ere long be rewarded by a full, clear view. (Inaugural address, 1884).

What was notable at the time was his insistence that inebriety was a disease.

IS DRUNKENNESS A DISEASE?

AN INTERVIEW WITH DR.NORMAN KERR

THIS is a question that has not been so fully discussed in public as it deserves to be. That disease is often the effect of drunkenness most people know, but that drunkenness is often the effect of disease is a proposition by no means so fully accepted. Yet there now exists in London, as there has long existed in America, a society—chiefly consisting of doctors—for the study and cure of inebriety. The president of the Society for the Study and Cure of Inebriety is Dr. Norman Kerr, a physician recognized in the medical profession as the principal authority on the physical aspect of drunkenness, and the public, owing to Mr. Axel Gustafson's recent lectures at Exeter Hall, having heard a good deal lately about the other aspects of the matter, the present writer sought out Dr. Norman Kerr to hear what he had to say, whereupon the following conversation ensued :—

Dr. Kerr : I think the physical aspect of inebriety has not been fully recognized either by the State or by the temperance or religious world in this country. In America, on the other hand, Dr. Benjamin Rush, a hundred years ago, distinctly taught that inebriety was a disease, and ought to be treated in special hospitals. In America there are now a large number of such institutions, many of them largely supported at the public charge by the various States in which they are situated. In some States a considerable part of the receipts from licences go to the support of these homes. In addition to that the magistrates have the power of giving persons convicted of being drunk the alternative of being treated at one of these homes instead of going to prison.

And which do they generally prefer?—As many prefer the prisons as the homes.

That does not say much for the homes.—On the contrary, it does.

How do you make that out? Because they know they will be cured of drunkenness if they go to the homes, and it is because some of them do not want to be cured that they prefer to go to prison.

And the treatment in these American homes. How does it differ from the treatment in English ones?—The treatment in all genuine and intelligently conducted homes for inebriates is much the same. But, I may tell you, there are homes and homes. Some are mere commercial speculations, without any attempt at cure or reformation, indulgence in liquor being winked at, and even encouraged in certain cases. Then there is a second class of homes, both in America and in England, which may be called in popular phraseology purely "faith cure" homes, where the physical conditions of the inebriates are altogether ignored, and the only means used are moral and religious influences. The first class are not genuine at all; the second are genuine in the sense of being honest and well-intentioned, although the treatment is defective. Then there is the third class, which is honest and at the same time intelligent, because in this class both the physical and moral aspects of drunkenness are recognized. In this class the bodily disease is dealt with by appropriate medical and hygienic treatment directed to the cure or alleviation of the particular state of each patient, and to building up healthy brain and nerve tissue. Moral and religious influences are at the same time employed to strengthen the self-control, the loss of which is, perhaps, the most difficult thing we have to cope with in dipsomania. Indeed, considerable emphasis is laid on the moral and religious influences, because of their elevating and purifying effect on the depravity of the inebriates in whom, in the diseased state, selfishness, lying, and deceit are generally met with.

Where is there such a home in England?—The Dalrymple home at Rickmansworth. It is indeed the only one licensed under the Habitual Drunkards Act, conducted without pecuniary profit to the proprietary, and publishing its records in scientific form.

But has not the Habitual Drunkards Act been a failure? —Not quite. Although imperfect, it has yet done some good. For example, eighteen gentlemen have voluntarily entered this home for the full period of twelve months each.

Don't you find that few people give their consent to entering? – Yes. The ordeal of declaring oneself an habitual drunkard before two justices of the peace is most formidable, especially to ladies. But in America, and in some of our colonies, patients can enter on a simple agreement, and once they are in the home the conductor has the power to detain them, abuses being guarded against by frequent inspection.

And the practical results of the treatment in these homes? -In all genuine and intelligently conducted homes, like the Dalrymple Home, one-third of the patients have been permanently cured.

Then you consider, Dr. Kerr, that drunkenness is really a disease? Undoubtedly. In a very large number of cases as clearly a disease as gout, or rheumatism, or insanity.

How comes this disease generally?--Through certain physical degenerations of body and brain, which may be inherited or may be acquired.

Do you mean that a craving for alcohol is often inherited, just as gout or cancer is? – Perhaps that is hardly the correct way to state the facts. The disease of inebriety, apart from the act of drunkenness, consists either in, an unhealthful craving for or an unhealthful impulse to, intoxication. In some cases the taste for alcohol is inherited, but in the majority of these cases a physical tendency to intoxication is inherited, which tendency, on the application of an exciting cause, such as a glass of liquor, lends to an outburst of drunkenness, even in cases where people hate the taste of the intoxicant itself.

Do you really mean to say that there are people who hate the taste of liquor and yet drink to excess? – Yes, I have met very many of them.

If they hate the taste, why do they drink? – Because overpowered by a diseased impulse or craving.

You mean that people who hate the intoxicating agent yet crave for the intoxicated condition which it produces, or that they hate the intoxicant yet love the intoxication? – Precisely; that is just what I do mean.

How do your account for that? – Because of a condition of pathological unrest, or a diseased and overpowering mental and physical uneasiness which is impossible to describe, but which demands relief even at the price of adding to the trouble.

What in your remedy? – Absolute and unconditional abstinence from all intoxicants whatever under all circumstances.

What? Even at the Communion would you prohibit wine? – Yes; fermented wine, intoxicants are so dangerous to many reformed drunkards, and also to total abstainers who have inherited the disease of inebriety. Many distressing cases of relapse have occurred from a sacramental intoxicant.

Dr. Norman Kerr, who, together with Dr. B. W. Richardson, Is one of the honorary consulting physicians to the Dalrymple Hone at Rickmansworth, then permitted the writer to visit that establishment, which he found to be a country mansion called "The Cedars," standing on a terrace 30 ft. above the river Colne, which flows through five acres of charming grounds belonging to the place. A theatre, billiard room; reading room, tennis lawn, quoit and bowling alley, gymnasium, workshops, and skating rink – all belonging to the house, which has accommodation for 20 patients—showed that amusements were not forgotten as part of this treatment, the result of which may be summed up in the verdict of the Government inspector as contained in his last report.—" The success of this retreat is very marked." The Dalrymple Home is really a scientific experiment, on which the scientific treatment of inebriety in England will largely depend, as Dr. Crothers, editor of the American Quarterly Journal of inebriety, has pointed out. It is therefore interesting to notice that its records indicate an intimate connection between drunkenness and disease. For instance, out of 103 cases treated there the habit of drunkenness had been caused in 40 cases by injuries to the nerves, head, or spine. In 44 cases some complaint or disease was present, dyspepsia claiming the largest number of victims, and insanity coming next; while in 43 cases hereditary tendency to inebriety had been traced, and in 59 cases no family history at all was obtainable. By far the largest number of the patients were described as " gentlemen of no occupation," but only in eight out of the whole 103 cases was "want of employment" the exciting cause of the drunkenness, which in thirty cases was, attributable to "sociability," in six to "business temptation," in nine to "domestic trouble," in eight to " business and professional worry," in one to "over study," in two to "overwork," in one to " sunstroke," in one to " fear of conscription," in two to "college life," in one to "colonial life," and three to "travelling." So much for the statistics of the Dalrymple Home, to which may be added Dr. Kerr's opinion that changes of climate, loss of friends or fortune, sudden changes of surroundings, and shocks to the nervous system are among the things which sometimes cause sober people to become drunkards. The importance of Dr. Kerr's views need not be insisted upon, seeing that if they are right most of our temperance legislation must be wrong.

==== The Inebriates Act 1898 ====
A parliamentary inquiry was held in 1889–1890 into the treatment of inebriates. By 1892 many temperance societies, such as the Church of England Temperance Society, supported compulsory legislation for habitual drunkards.

In 1893 a deputation from the British Medical Association, the Society for the Study of Inebriety, the Homes for Inebriates Association, the British Women's Temperance Association, and other bodies met with the Home Secretary, Mr Asquith, to discuss the compulsory detention of inebriates. The Home Secretary recognised that the Habitual Drunkards Act 1879 (42 & 43 Vict. c. 19) only covered the well-to-do and that the only option for others was punishment. "The conclusions and recommendations of that committee have been for some considerable time under my attention, and it is my hope that in the next session of Parliament we shall introduce a Bill which will seek to give effect to the more important of them."

He was interviewed in 1896 by the Daily Mail on his views on the proposed legislation:

New Law for Drunkards

Interview with Dr Norman Kerr

Sir Matthew White Ridley has definitely promised to bring a bill early next session enacting curative treatment for drunkenness instead of conditional commitment to prison. For years Dr. Norman Kerr has been the recognised medical specialist for inebriety, and has led this crusade from the commencement. He has been consulted again and again by the Home Office, and he willingly gave his views on the new situation to a "Daily Mail" representative when he called upon him at Hamilton Terrace. "The present treatment of habitual drunkards by continual imprisonment" said the doctor "is utterly useless from every point of view. It does a man no good, except for the moment to restore to him the capacity which he lost before imprisonment for further indulgence in intoxicating drinks. The helpful withholding of all intoxicants for a short time confirms as well as renews the old habits. It really prolongs the life of the drunkard, but does him no physical god, and neither cures nor deters him from drinking to excess."

"How do you prove your point doctor? – Well, the proof may be found in the police courts. Men and women are constantly appearing in the courts with hundreds of convictions, and London has several such courts. Why only in Swansea the other day three habitual drunkards, with hundreds of convictions against them, were all before the courts at one sitting."

"Then, again I believe you advocate compulsory curative treatment on the grounds of economy?" – "Yes, that is so. Do you know that in some cases the cost per individual to the State has amounted to something like £1,000? It will be much cheaper to adopt curative seclusion in special hospitals or homes. A large proportion of those cases would be cured, and these police court repeaters would be restored to industrious portion of the population, with a corresponding increase in national wealth."

“What percentage of cures do you think would follow such treatment?" – "That is rather hard to say, but from my experience, and from what I know of such treatment all over the world, at least one third of those treated on curative scientific lines have been cured permanently."

Alluding to the difficulties of such legislation, the doctor said:

"In reply to a deputation from the Society for the Study of Inebriety, of which I am president, and the British Medical Association, The Home Secretary promised to bring in a bill dealing with the criminal habitual drunkards. The difficulty with the non-criminal drunkards is great, because of the abuse of personal liberty, but for any of those who at any time have been before the courts, adequate proposals will be formulated. But the Government say they must be careful on this point."

"But what is the view of those who are agitating for the compulsory detention of inebriates?" – "We all think it is a bugbear; but we are prepared to support any safeguarding provisions, however hard, which in their wisdom the Government might consider necessary. We do not mind how strict the regulations are, for we know the substitution of curative scientific treatment for penal discipline will justify itself in a very short space of time."

For some time Dr. Kerr has been working a home Rickmansworth on these lines with most satisfactory results, and it was with some misgivings that I asked if he preferred detention in Government homes or in voluntary institutions with State aid. But his reply, if surprising, was most emphatic. He said:–"I am decidedly in favour of the former course because I do not think the deprival of the liberty of any one person should be in the hands of any private agency. I, too, am jealous of personal liberty, and it might lead to abuse. But with Government homes it would be different. The committee of my Dalrymple Home would only be to glad to discontinue the institution if the Government or municipal authorities would open such homes directly under their control."

The Inebriates Act 1898 (61 & 62 Vict. c. 60), which empowered local authorities to set up state certified reformatories to treat habitual drunkards, was the culmination of his work.

==== Morphinomania ====
Inebriate originally described a person intoxicated with alcohol, but it later came to include other intoxicating drugs.

The Use of Narcotics Among Women
Dr. Norman Kerr has been interviewed by a correspondent of Woman upon the increasing use of narcotics by women. Alcohol, he says, is the Most frequently used narcotic. "But I could give you a formidable list of narcotics which women in all ranks ranks of society are daily using:Chloral, chlorodyne, ether, chloroform (less usedby women here than in America), sal volatile, eau-de-Cologne, and so on. I have known ladies addicted to alcohol drink three bottles of brandy a day. A bottle a day is by no means an uncommon quantity. I have had patients who had habituated themselves to 2oz (960grs) of chloral as their daily allowance. Twenty grains of chloral I may say, is a full medicinal dose. I have treated patients who have been in the habit of swallowing 8oz of chlorodyne a day; and I have known ladies who could take a pint of chlorodyne in the twenty-four hours. Both tea and coffee are used in excess. I found a patient insensible in her room one day who had drunk nothing but tea. But she had consumed a pound of tea in the day. Tobacco, in the form of cigars as well as of cigarettes, is constantly resorted to by women. Thirty cigarettes a day has been the allowance of some of my patients"

Morphinomania

A talk with Dr Norman Kerr

The death of a well-known literary man a few days ago through morphlnomania has called attention to the rapid spread among brainworkers of this insidious habit. It was recently calculated that in America there are at least 100,000 people who use regularly opium in some of its forms. Signs are not wanting that in England more and more are constantly coming under the domination of the drug. Probably no man is better acquainted with all developments of narcomania than Dr. Norman Kerr, and I sought him out in his home in the north-west of London to learn something about the habit. If it were not for his snowy hair and beard, and his many reminiscences of the days before the Crimean War, one might take the physician for a young man; for his step Is more buoyant and his manner more vigorous than those of many men not half his years. Since the days when he served as a journalist on a Glasgow daily, in the times when the taxes on knowledge were still imposed, Dr. Kerr has seen much of life on both sides of the Atlantic.

"There can be no doubt about the great growth of morphinomania, both here and in America, during the last fifteen years," said Dr. Kerr in answer to my questions. "In England the victims have so far been mainly found among literary men and doctors; while a number of working men's wives and middle-class people have been captured using chlorodyne. Chlorodyne is expensive, and you may wonder how working men's wives can afford to take it in any quantities, but I have known cases where they have sold the furniture out of their houses and pawned all they could to obtain their doses. Inebriety from morphine differs from inebriety from alcohol in many ways. Alcohol is an Irritant and a narcotic, while morphine is only a narcotic; so that we never hear of the morphine victims making rows in the streets, smashing their furniture at home, or the like, as ordinary drunkards do. Then the great majority of alcohol users are restricted drinkers, and those who drink to excess are the exception. With morphia it is not so. The overwhelming majority of English or Americans who take opium in any form regularly become slaves to it. In a few weeks, often only four or six, after the first dose is taken, the victim is a confirmed morphinomaniac; almost irreclaimable unless he allows others to restrain him, and apparently totally unable to break off the habit by himself. This is where we differ from the races of the East. The people of India or China can use opium in one form or another in small doses for a lifetime without increasing the quantity, and without becoming slaves to the drug. They are more lethargic than ourselves, the drug does not have the same emotional effect on them as on us, and comparatively little harm results. But with the Englishman it is not so. We have more highly-strung temperaments, we are more susceptible to pain and emotion, and in this country the vast majority of people who once take to morphine are doomed men, and go to the devil."

"Why do people, doctors and professional men especially, start the habit?"

"A few brainworkers start taking opium to increase their intellectual activity, but the most common cause at first Is to relieve pain, or to give rest in insomnia. In quite 30 per cent of the cases I have met there has been some hereditary predisposition, either direct or transformed heredity."

"What, may l ask, do you mean by transformed heredity ?"

“I mean that some abnormal condition of the brain has been set up by other bad habits in ancestors. Possibly one of the forefathers of the victim has been an alcohol maniac, and his progeny inherit a diseased brain state that may take the form of epilepsy or Insanity, or may produce a morbid craving or impulse that creates alcohol or morphinomania, as circumstances favour. Sometimes we find the children of opium-takers drunkards, and the children of drunkards morphine-takers. The growing strain of life to-day is no doubt largely responsible for the growth of the habit. Professional men toil on till in a state of exhaustion, and then, in order to be able to do more, they take a narcotic.”

“What are the effects of morphine taking?”

"Within a few seconds, or a minute or two after taking a hyperdermic injection, the circulation is increased. there Is great muscular activity, the eyes become brighter, the pulse beats faster, the cheeks are flushed, and thoughts seem to come very freely. The taker feels very excited, has rosy dreams, and Imagines many things. Following this comes a feeling of great satisfaction and ineffable composure. Then the pulse becomes slower, and there comes a sensation of supreme content, gradually sinking into a state of torpor. The flushed face becomes pale, the pupils of the eyes contract, and the face assumes a vacant look. When he awakes from this torpor the taker has to pay a fearful price for his indulgence. His sensations are most terrible and agonising; he feels fearfully depressed and horribly uneasy, and has an almost unconquerable craving for a fresh dose of the drug. The moment he takes another dose the same thing Is gone over again. So he goes on, taking doses sometimes several times a day, and gradually having to increase his doses to produce the same effect."

"Can a man be a morphinomaniac without his friends knowing it ?"

"Many are; and I knew of one case where one student, living with another, sleeping in the same room, took morphine for a long time without his friend having the slightest idea of it. The Injection can be so easily made that victims will take a drug while sitting talking in a drawing-room with friends without those by them noticing anything, save that they suddenly become brighter and more lively." “ You must remember," Dr. Kerr continued, " that morphine, like other drugs, affects different people in various ways. Some might take it for weeks as a medicine, and then be able to leave it off with hardly an effort, there being nothing in their nervous system that responds to the action of the drug. Some victims can take large doses for years, living this constantly changing existence of bliss and agony without any apparent organic change. Others again become rapidly emaciated, and once the use of the morphia causes a rapid loss of flesh the end is in sight. In medicine we have always to allow for the personal equation."—Correspondent of the " Daily News."

=== Medical jurisprudence ===
He was vice-president of the International Congress of Medical jurisprudence. His paper "What Shall We Do With Alcoholic Inebriates Apparently Insane?" was read at the Medico-Legal Congress, New York (1895). In 1889 he wrote in a letter concerning the medical evidence in the Maybrick case that "justice will not be satisfied till Mrs Maybrick receives a free pardon". He was also a speaker at the After-Care Association, set up in 1879 to facilitate the readmission of convalescents from lunatic asylums into social life.

=== Vegetarianism ===
Kerr was an advocate of vegetarianism, at one time entertaining 100 persons from the Marylebone Vestry to a vegetarian meal in the Walmer Castle Coffee Tavern, Marylebone Road, and on another occasion members of the medical profession. He provided a "Penny Supper" consisting of a vegetable stew for about 250 poor people living about Lisson Grove at the Perseverance Temperance Hall, to show "inexpensive and wholesome" food. Kerr promoted vegetarianism in his practice and had been a vegetarian since being a medical student.

=== Support for women ===
He supported the admission of women practitioners to the British Medical Association in 1878 when a motion was proposed to exclude them following the election of Mrs Garrett Anderson and Mrs Dr Hoggan.

Dr Norman Kerr, of London, opposed the motion, and maintaining the equal rights of members, he considered that, holding this opinion, he should be doing a mean, unmanly, and unjust act if he remained silent. There was no sex in art and science. In reply to the suggestion that some medical men objected to discuss questions with medical women, he urged that such men were inconsistent, inasmuch as they treated patients in the presence of a nurse, and made no scruple of modesty in other respects.

It was not until 1892 that women were admitted to the British Medical Association.

=== Support for early closing ===
He supported in 1881 the Early Closing Movement "limiting the hours of labour in shops to 12 daily", writing that "I have a very strong conviction, on medical grounds, that the present hours during which shop assistants have to work are excessive and prejudicial to health."

=== Kindness to animals ===
In 1895 he was part of a deputation from the Church of England Society for Promoting Kindness to Animals to the Education Office requesting schools to teach "the nature and particular requirements" of animals that children were most familiar with. Representing the Church Sanitary Association as vice-chairman he was part of a deputation asking the County Council to adopt a system of properly supervised public abattoirs "for the good in every way, as well for the cause of kindness to animals as for that of sanitation".

== Publications ==
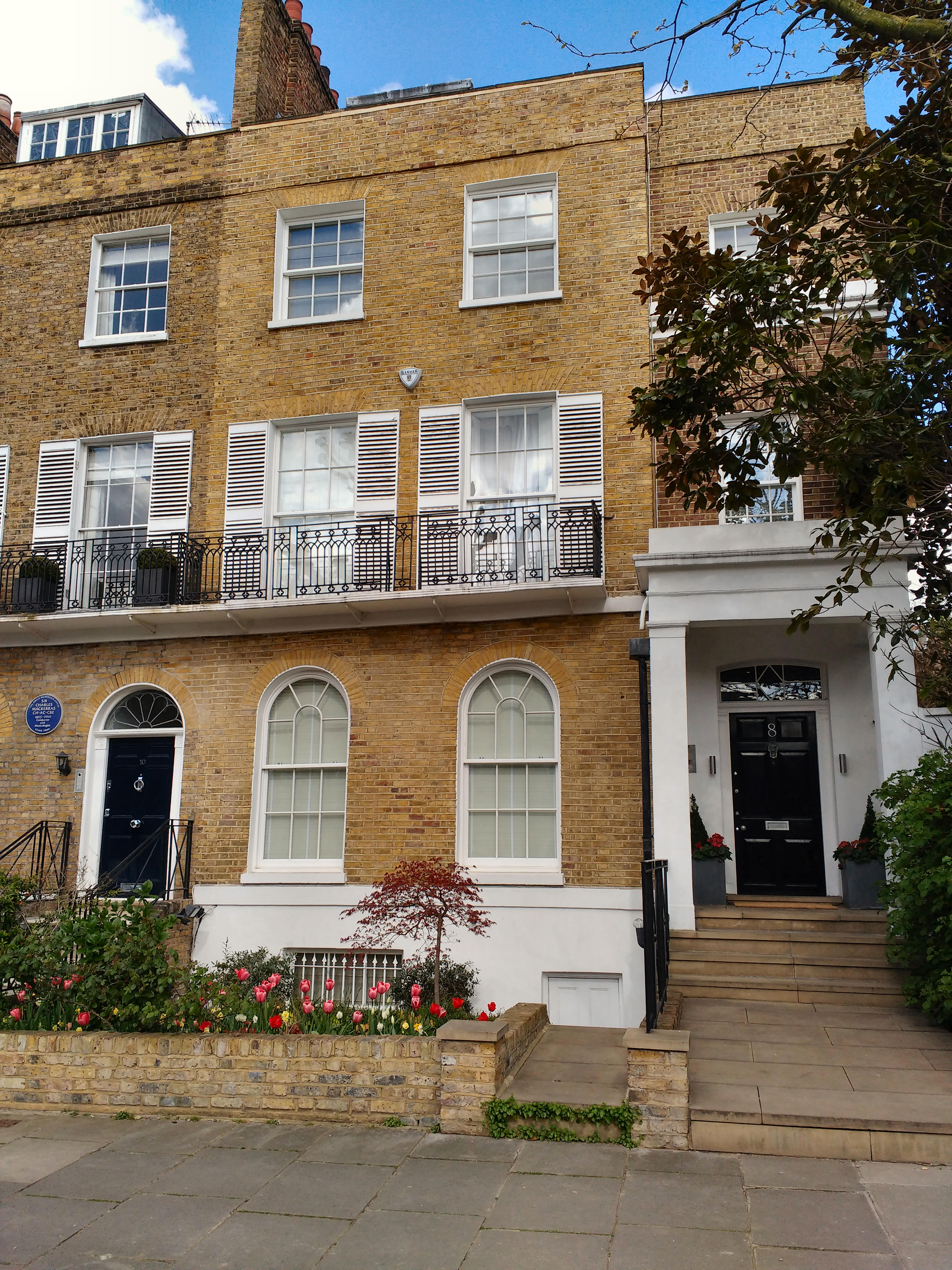
1 Hamilton Terrace

- Medical aspect of the temperance question, especially upon the action of alcoholic liquors in health. London, Church of England Temperance Society [1875]
- The Action of Alcoholic Liquors in Health. London, [1876]
- Intemperance and its remedy. London, National Temperance Publication Depot [1877]
- Mortality from Intemperance. London, National Temperance Publication Depot [1879]
- Female intemperance. London, National Temperance Publication Depot [1880]
- The heredity of alcohol : Read at the International Congress for the study of alcoholism, held at Brussels, August 1880. London : National Temperance Publication Depot [1880]
- Stimulants in Workhouses. London, National Temperance Publication Depot [1882]
- Cholera : its prevention and cure, with special reference to alcohol. London, National Temperance Publication Depot [1884]
- Inaugural address. Society for the Study and Cure of Inebriety. London, H. K. Lewis [1884]
- Wines : scriptural and ecclesiastical. London, National Temperance Publication Depot [edition 1 1882, edition 2 1887]
- The Truth about Alcohol. London, H. K. Lewis [1885]
- Hydrophobia And Its Prevention. The British Medical Journal, vol. 2, no. 1344, 1886, pp. 628–629 [1886].
- Inebriety; its Etiology, Pathology, Treatment and Jurisprudence. London, H. K. Lewis [1888, 1889]
- Does inebriety conduce to longevity? London, H. K. Lewis [1889]
- How to deal with inebriates, in: Report of the III. International Congresses against the Abuse of Spiritual Beverages in Christiania 3–5. Sept. 1890. (Bericht des III. Internationalen Congresses gegen den Missbrauch Geistiger Getränke in Christiania 3–5. Sept. 1890. Hrsg. vom Organisationscomite. Published: Christiania, Mallinske Boktrykkeri, 1891.)
- Inebriety and Criminal Responsibility. [1891]
- Inebriety or Narcomania : Its Etiology, Pathology, Treatment, and Jurisprudence. London, H. K. Lewis [1894]
- Alcoholism and Drug Habits. in Twentieth Century Practice; An International Encyclopedia of Modern Medical Science. Vol III. New York, William Wood & Co [1895]

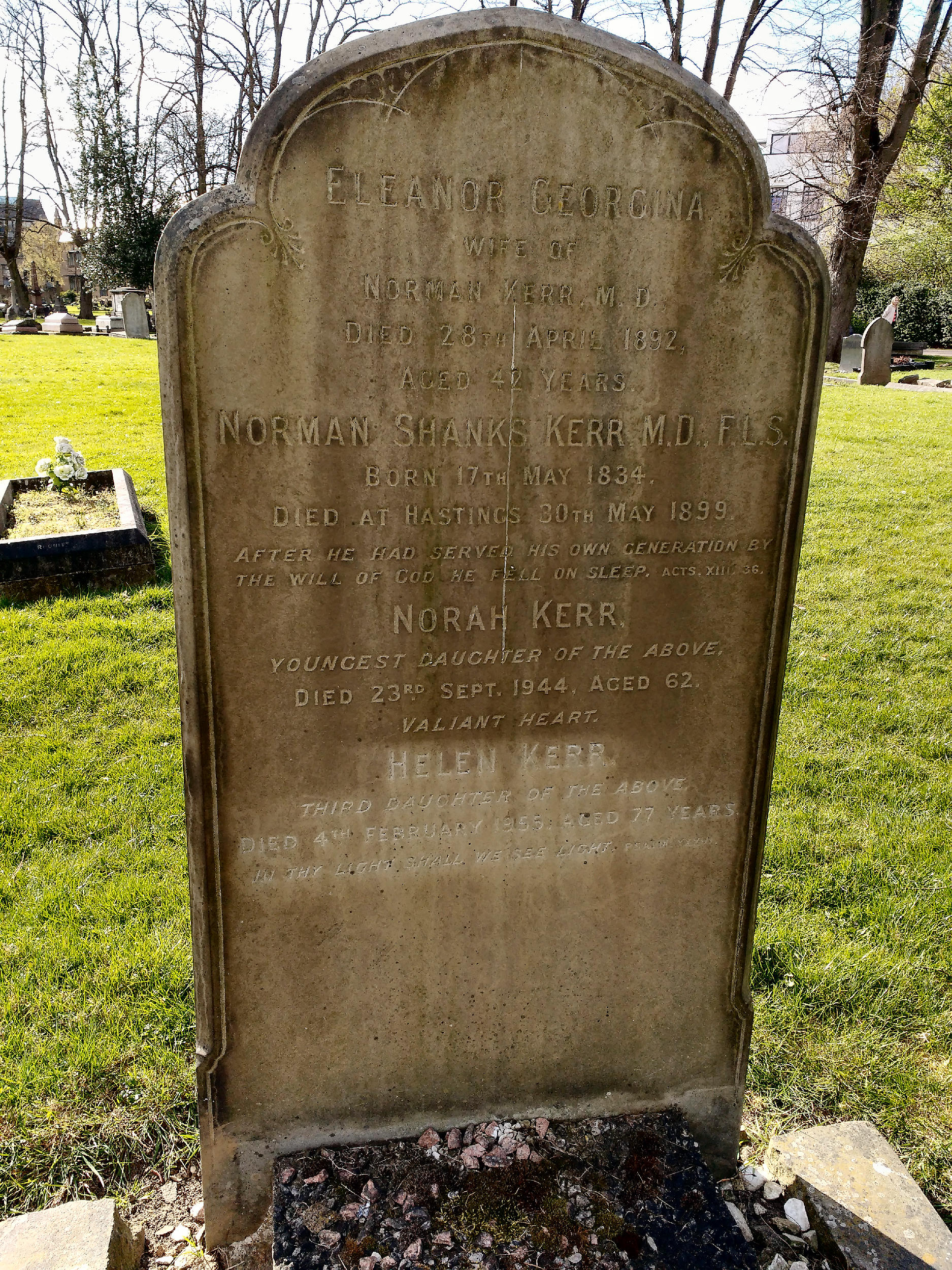
Norman Shanks Kerr. Paddington old cemetery (1C 8873)

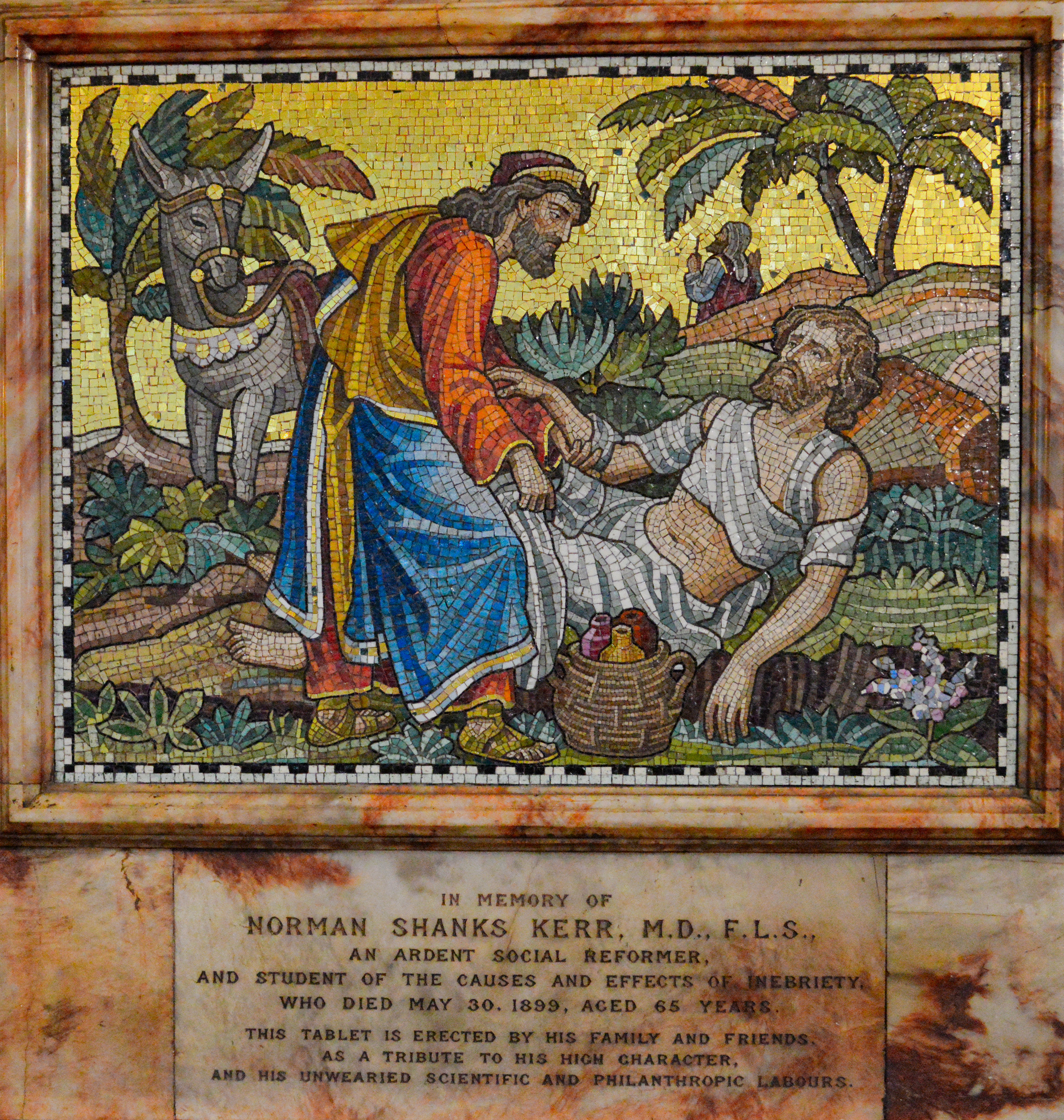
Memorial mosaic to Norman Shanks Kerr

== Personal life ==
By 1871 he was living at Markyate Street, Bedfordshire (now Hertfordshire), and married Eleanor Georgina Gibson (born 1850, Ballinderry, Ireland) at St Peter's, South Kensington; they had a son and four daughters. From 1874 he lived in Grove Road, (now Lisson Grove) St.John's Wood, London and was employed as the Medical Officer of Health for Marylebone. After the death of his wife in 1892 he was married for a second time in 1894 at Booterstown to Edith Jane Henderson (1851 - 1922), who was vice president of the Women's Total Abstinence Union from 1898 until 1917. From 1896 he lived at Hamilton Terrace, London NW8. He did not retire from his post until the January before his death and "had been ailing for a year past, suffering from Bright's disease and from frequent attacks of bronchitis". Dr Crothers reported that he had developed diabetes.

He died of influenza at Wellington Square, Hastings, England on 30 May 1899 and is buried in the Paddington old cemetery.

The funeral at St Mark's Church was taken by Canon Duckworth on Saturday 3 June and attended by his family, including his brother Alexander Kerr and nephews George Murray and Dr Andrew Murray.

His son, Arthur (1872–1933), was ordained an Anglican priest while his daughters were teachers and never married. His second wife, Edith, died in 1922; she is buried at Bognor Regis Old Cemetery.

Death of Dr Norman Kerr
Our readers will regret to hear of the death of Dr Norman Kerr, who passed peacefully away on Tuesday night at Hastings, whither he had gone in the hope of restoring his fast failing health and strength. Dr Kerr was associated, during the greater part of his career, with this parish, and for many years held the position of district medical officer to the Marylebone Board of guardians. It was only a few months ago that he resigned the duties of that office, and our poor law administrators marked their appreciation of his services by voting him a handsome pension. Dr Kerr's practice led him among all classes of society – chiefly among the poor of Lisson-grove. He therefore possessed exceptional facilities for the study of that disease in which he was a recognised specialist. No medical man has devoted more time and labour to the study of alcoholism than Dr Kerr. He was chairman of the Society for the Study of Inebriety, and in that capacity gave valuable evidence before many Parliamentary Committees. His pen was never at rest, and he was a continual contributor to the various medical journals and to the temperance organs and general magazines. It is said that he published more than twenty books relating to the subject of inebriety. He was a temperance advocate from the scientific standpoint, and left the economic and social aspects of the drink question to others to deal with. He was a close student of sociology and interested himself in many movements outside the temperance agitation. He held strong views on sanitation and joined the crusade against "kissing the book"; preferring, for hygienic reasons, the Scotch method of taking the oath. Dr Kerr formerly resided in Grove road, and when his house was acquired by the Great Central Railway Company removed to Hamilton terrace. His genial presence will be greatly missed in Marylebone, and his death will be mourned by rich and poor alike.

== Legacy ==
- A mosaic memorial by Salviati of Venice of the Good Samaritan was erected to him in 1901 at St Mark's Church, Hamilton Terrace, London NW8.
- The Norman Kerr Memorial Lectures were started in 1905 to commemorate his life and work and continued every second year until 1943.
- The Society for the Study and Cure of Inebriety continues today as The Society for the Study of Addiction.
- Some of his books are still available today as classic reprints.
