= Charles Worley =

British architect (1853–1906)

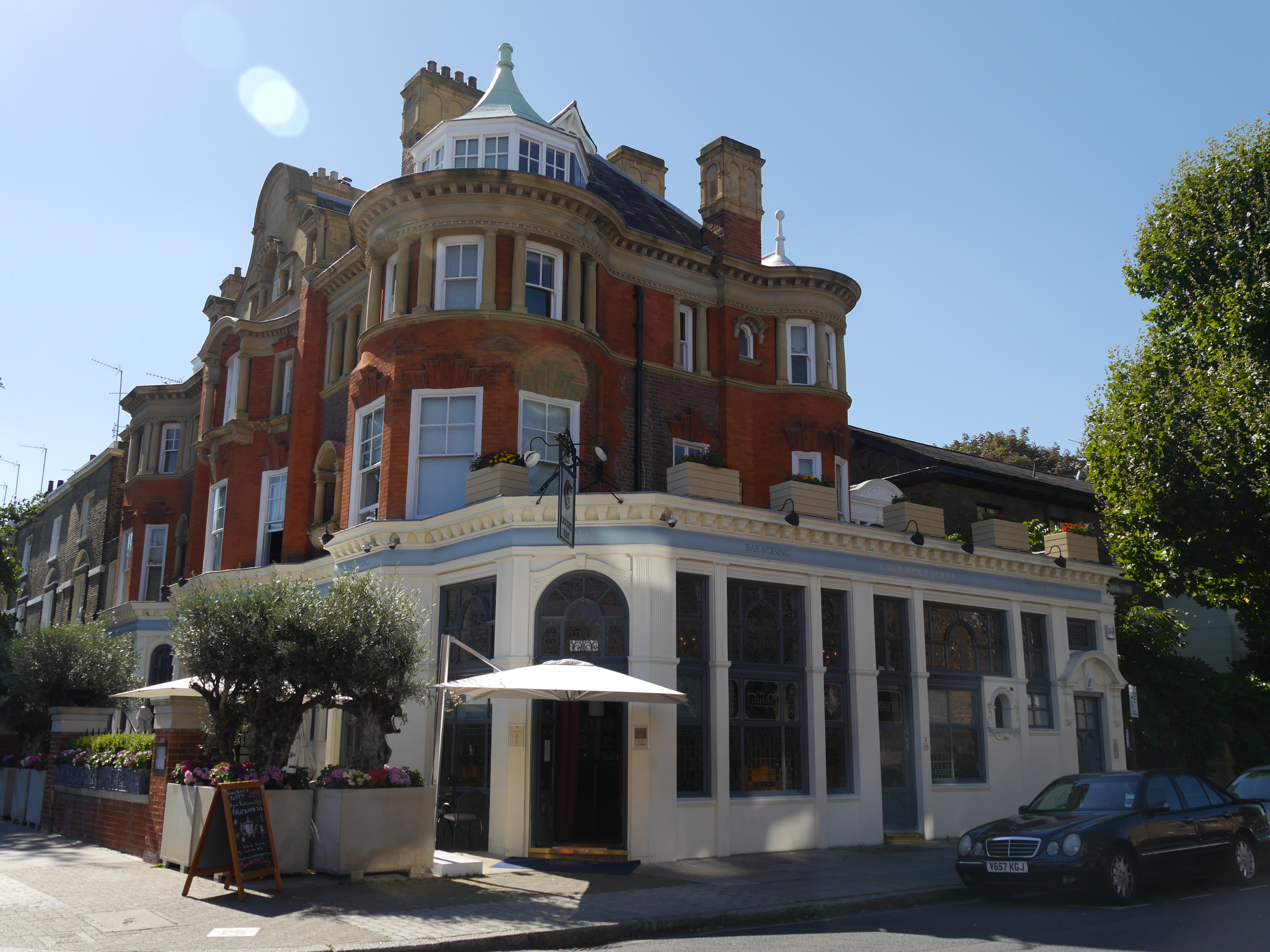
Crocker's Folly, 2016

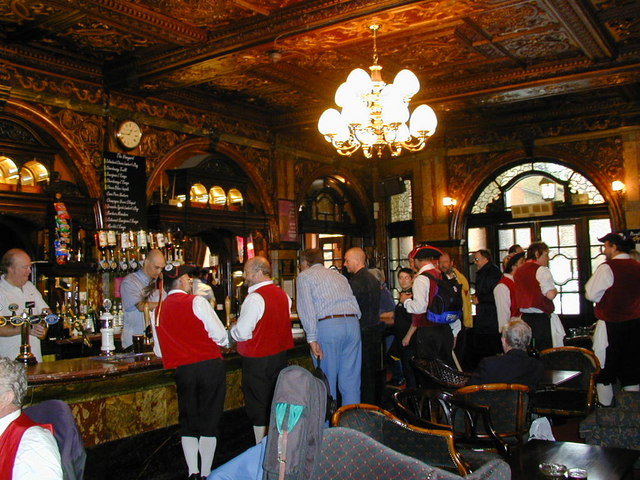
The interior, 2001

Charles H Worley (1853–1906) was a British architect.

== Early life ==
Allinson puts forward that Charles Worley was the son of the architect Robert James Worley (1850–1930), of the architectural practice Worley & Saunders, who was "involved in all kinds of speculative developments". They are listed jointly as the architects of 41 Harley Street. However, as Robert was born in 1850, and Charles was articled in 1870, a father and son relationship is most improbable. This is supported by the fact that Charles Worley was the son of Joshua Worley, a shipbroker based in London, as per his marriage certificate to Ellen Lambert Hall which took place on 22 August 1878 in the Holy Trinity Church, Marylebone, Lambeth, London.

English Heritage also confirm, probably incorrectly that Robert and Charles were brothers. This is unlikely since genealogical records show that Charles had two brothers, Joshua b. 1847, Francis b. 1849 and one sister, Ann b. 1851.

Worley was articled to Rowland Plumbe in 1870.

== Career ==
In 1892, he was the architect for 42 Harley Street, London.

From 1892 to 1893, he built Wimpole House, at 28–29 Wimpole Street, Marylebone, London.

In 1898, he built The Crown Hotel a Grade II* listed public house at 23–24 Aberdeen Place, St John's Wood, London, now known as Crocker's Folly.

== Buildings ==
His surviving buildings include:

- 28–30 Wigmore Street (1890–92)
- 42 Harley Street (1892)
- 28–29 Wimpole Street (1892–93)
- 51, 55–56 Welbeck Street (1893–94)
- 84 Wimpole Street (1895)
- The Crown Hotel, 23–24 Aberdeen Place, St John's Wood (1898)
- De Walden Rooms, Charlebert Street, St John's Wood (1898–99)
- 37 New Bond Street (1901)
- 6–7 St George Street (1904–05)
- 1–3 Old Compton Street (1904–07)
- 99A Charing Cross Road (1904–07)
- 3 Soho Square (1903)
- 12 Moor Street (1904–10)
