= List of residences of Joseph Haydn =

Map of Haydn's principal residences

This article is a chronologically-ordered list of the locations where the composer Joseph Haydn lived.

Haydn, who lived from 1732 to 1809, spent most of his life in a small region near Vienna no more than about 50 km. across, shown on the map at the right. This region was politically part of the Habsburg Empire; for reference the map shows the boundaries of modern-day Austria (green), Hungary (yellow), and Slovakia (pink).

== Chronological list ==
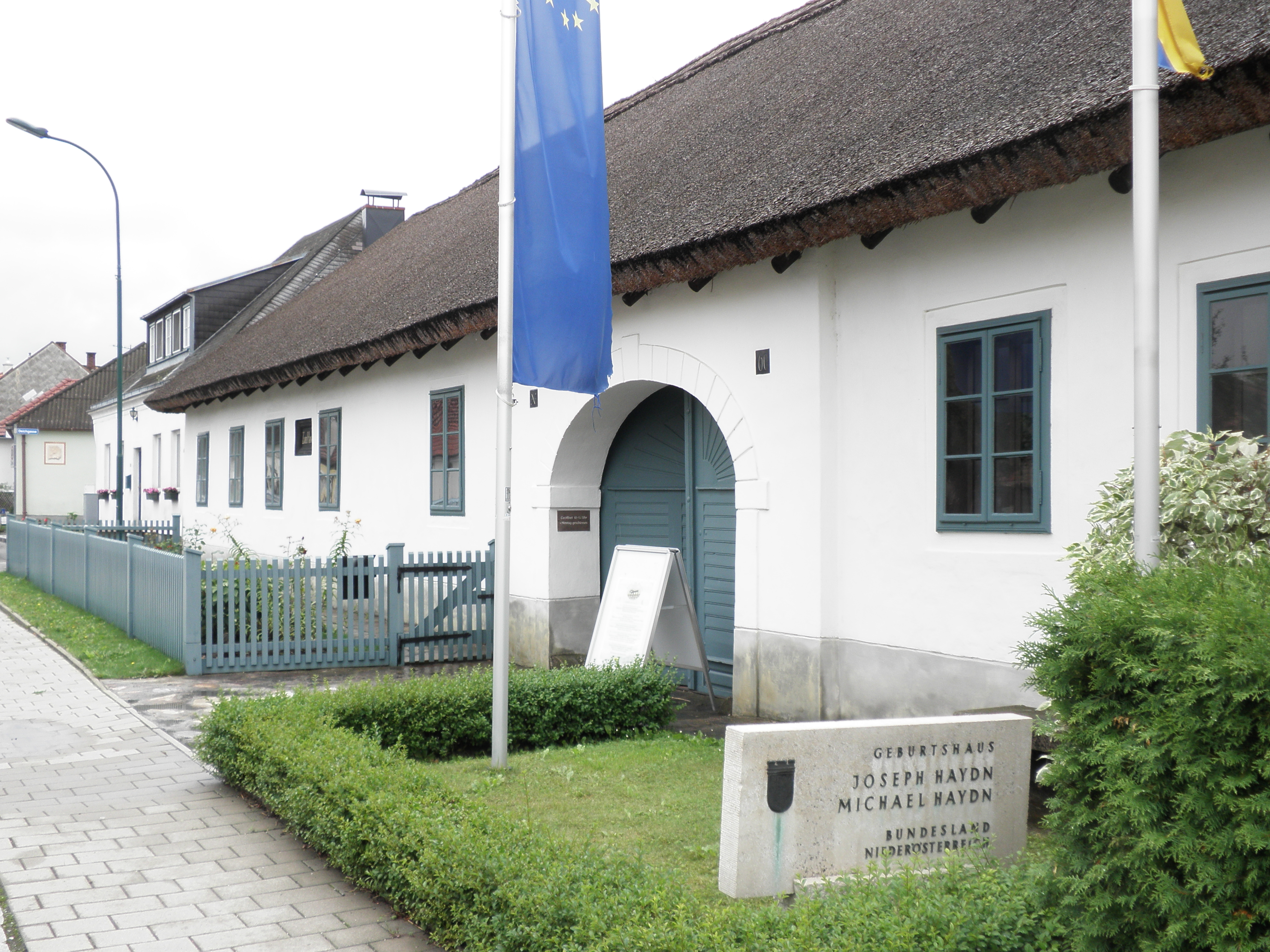
Haydn's birth home in Rohrau

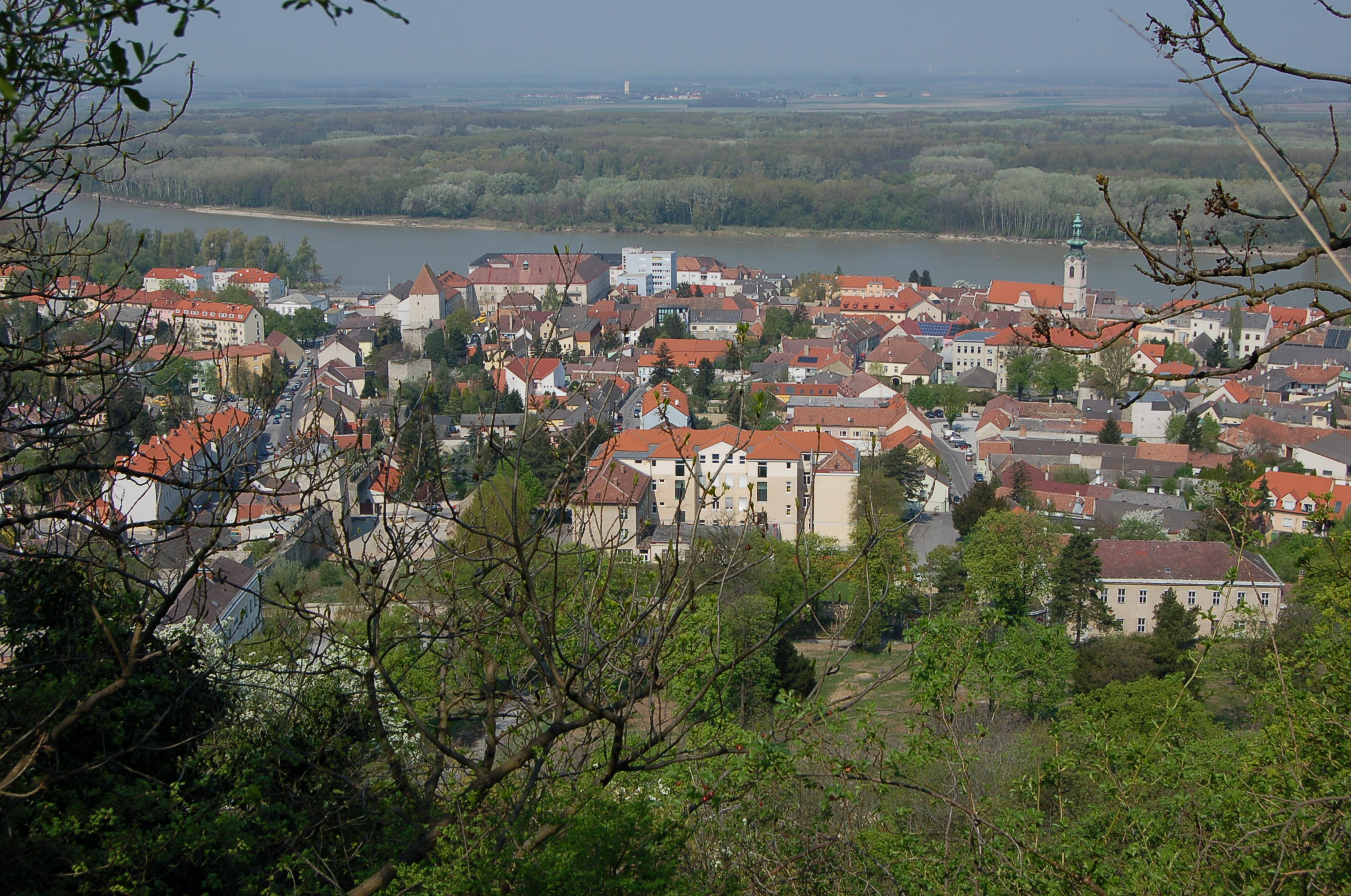
Hainburg

Foreground: the Kapellhaus of St. Stephen's Cathedral (demolished 1804)

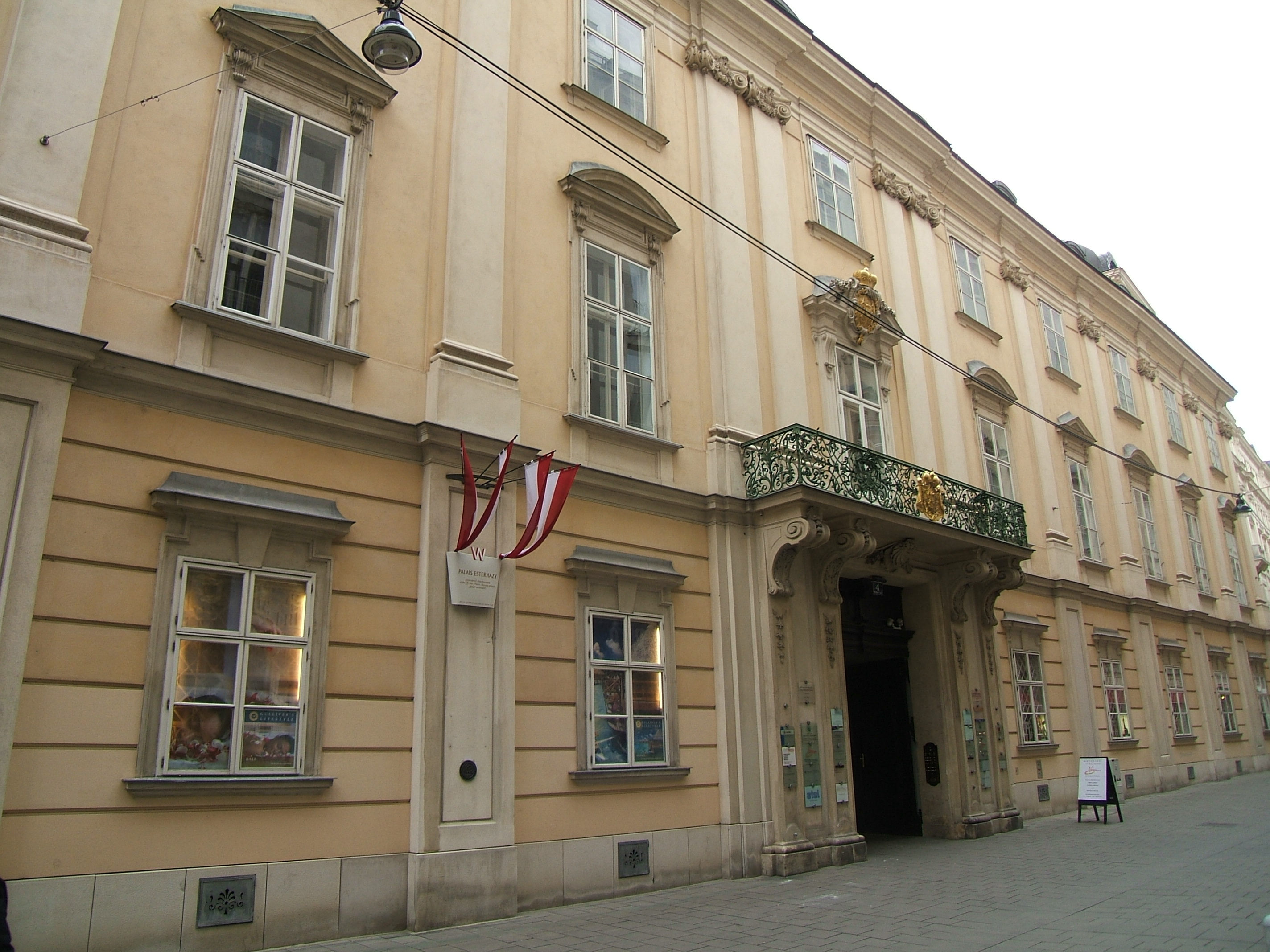
The city palace of the Esterházy family, on the Wallnerstrasse in Vienna

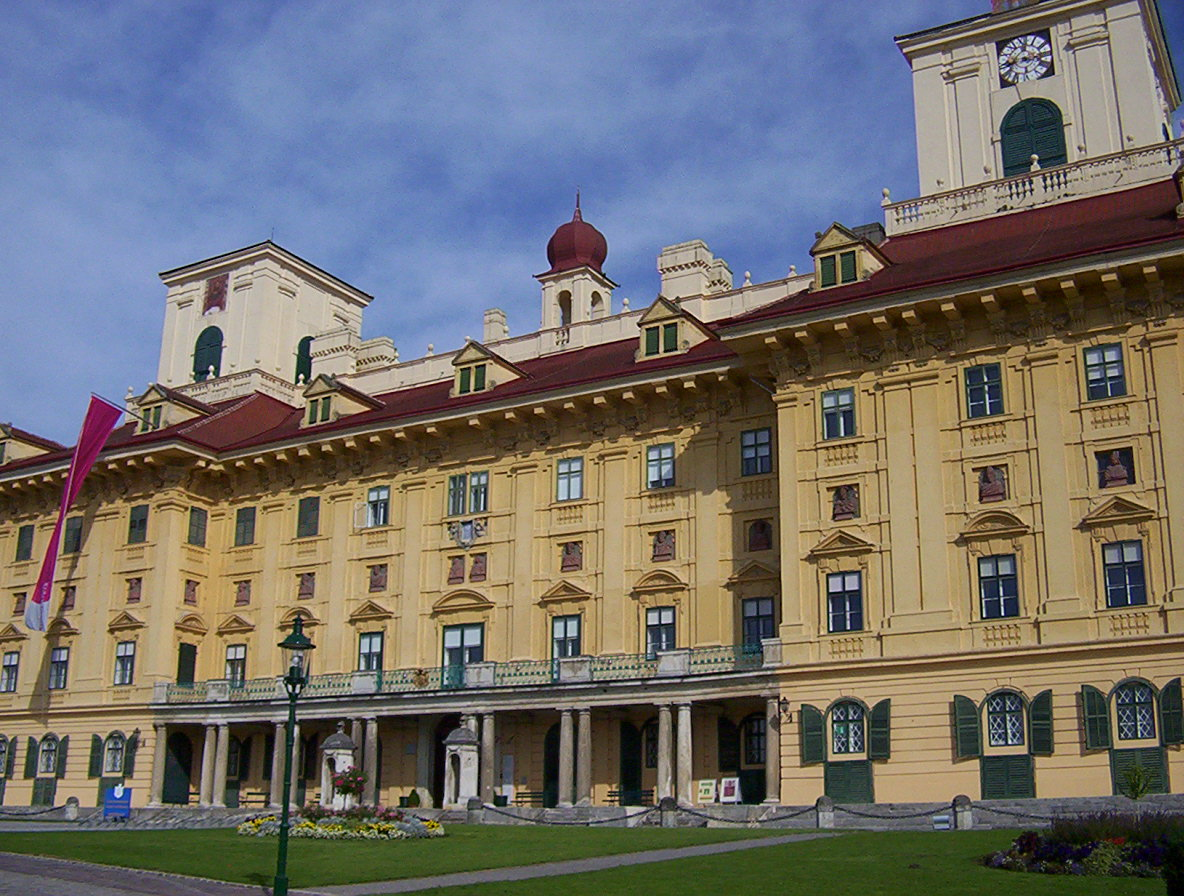
Schloss Esterházy in Eisenstadt, the seat of the Esterházy family

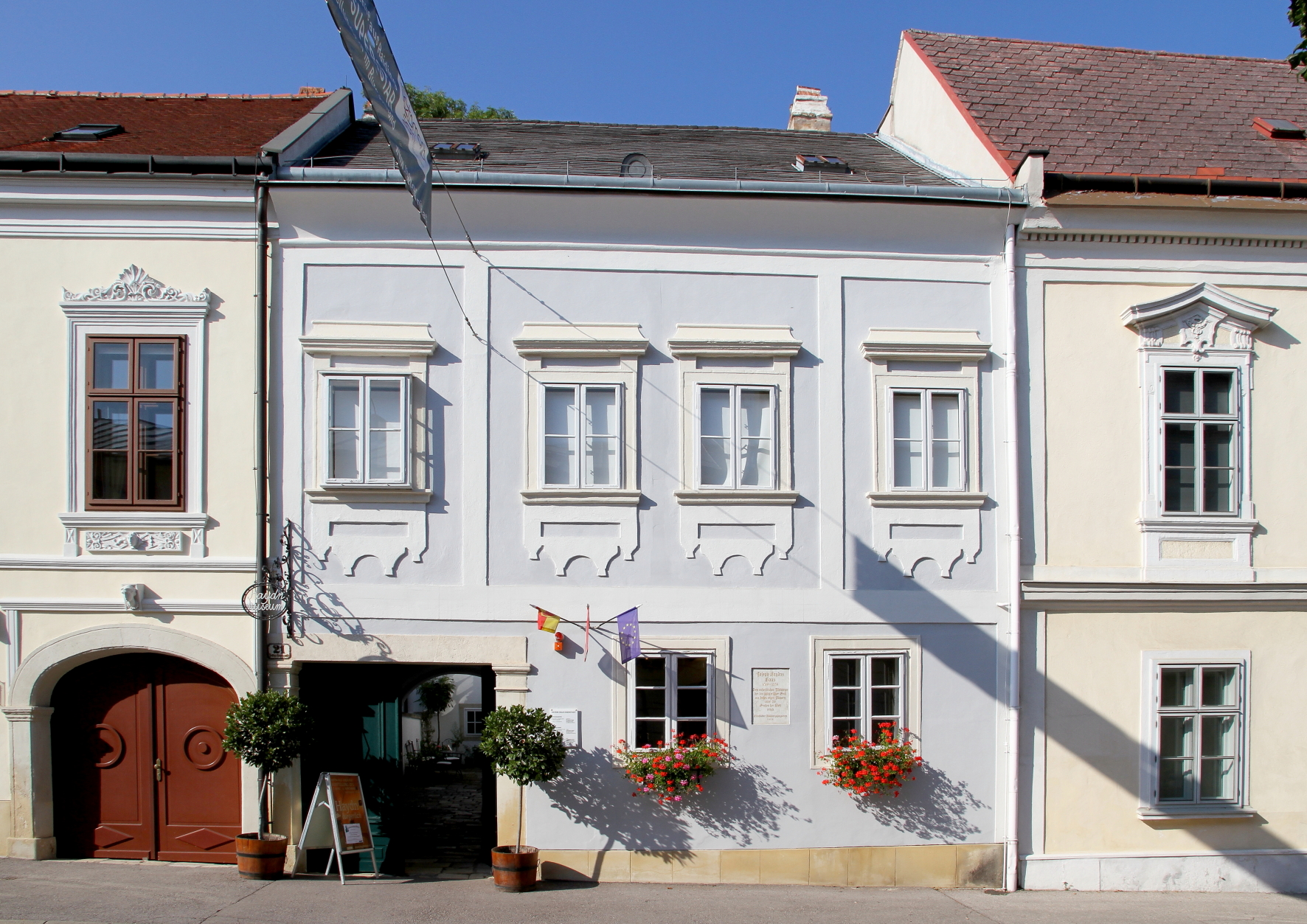
The house Haydn owned in Eisenstadt

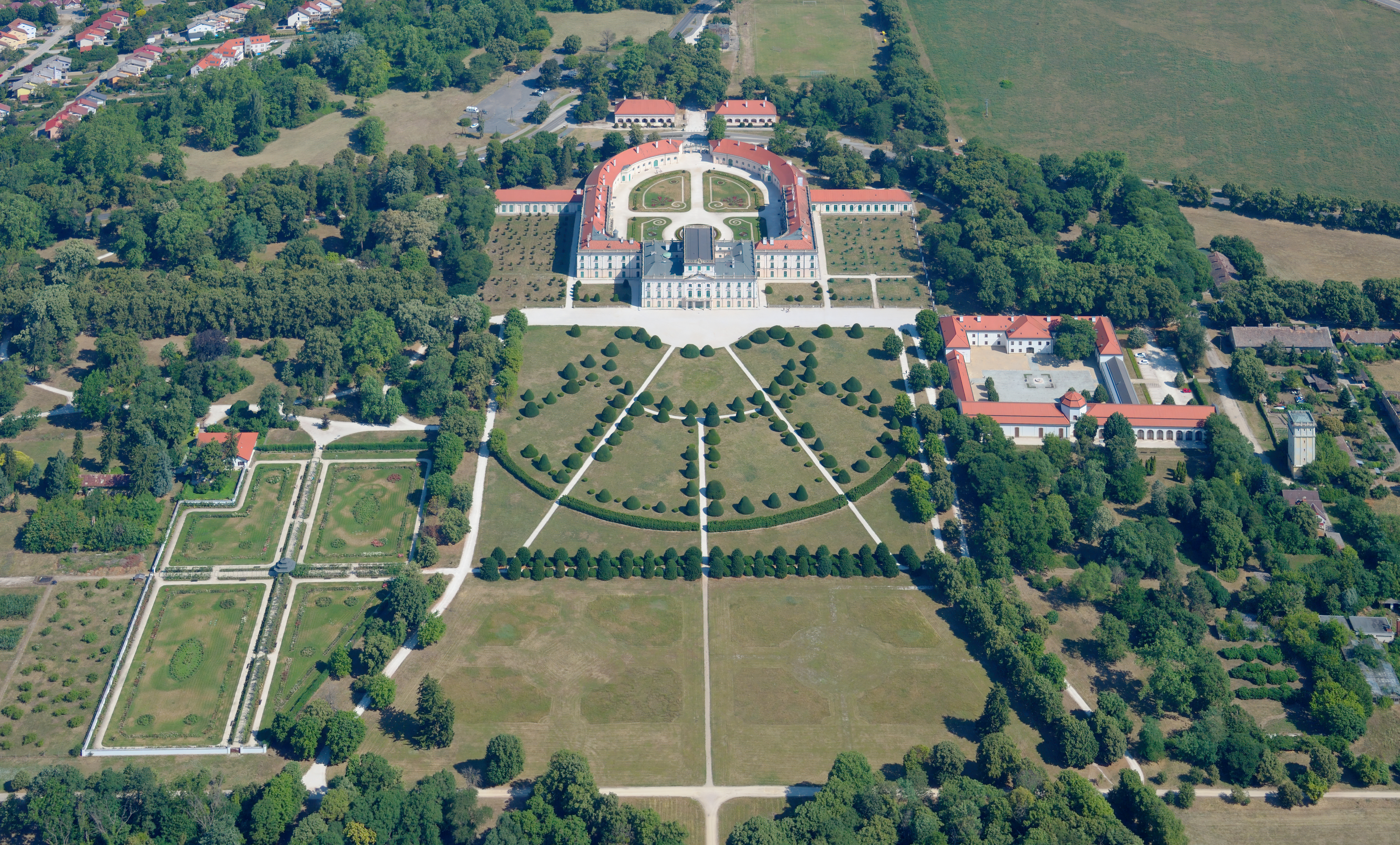
Esterháza Palace in Fertőd, Hungary

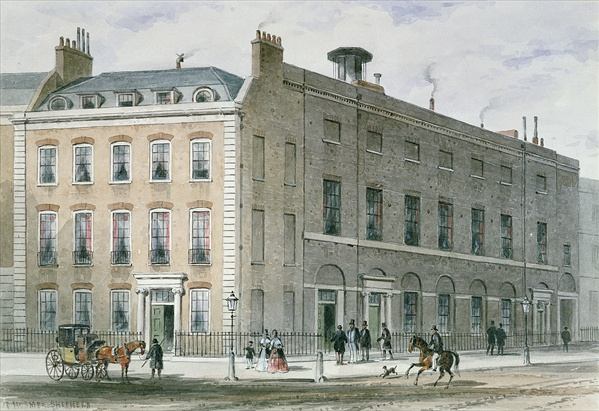
The Hanover Square Rooms, principal venue of Haydn's performances in London

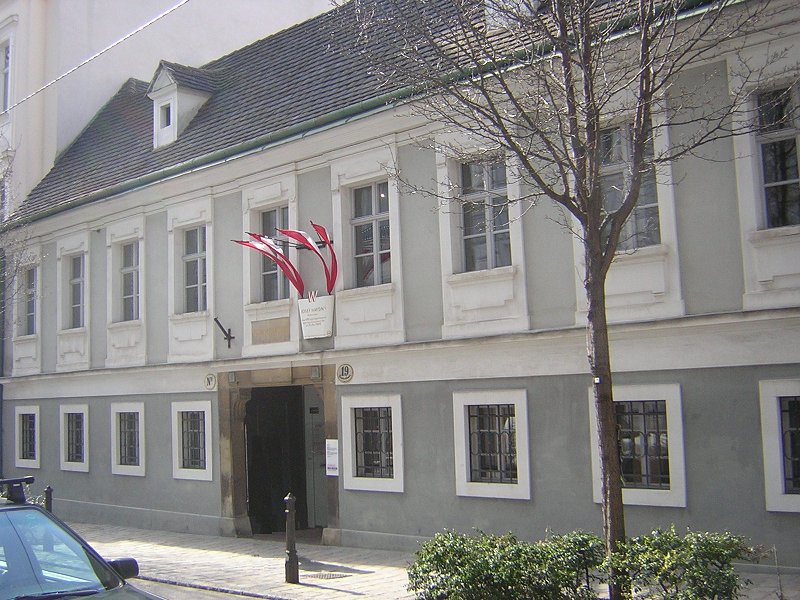
Haydn's house in Mariahilf, Vienna — he lived here in his last years (1797–1809); the address is Haydngasse 19

The approximate dates in each location are as follows.

- 1732–1737: the tiny village of Rohrau. Haydn's early-childhood home, at Obere Hauptstrasse 25, has been restored many times since Haydn's day and is currently a Haydn museum.
- 1737–1739 or 1740: the small town of Hainburg, in the home of his distant relative, the schoolmaster and choral director Johann Mathias Franck, who gave him his first formal training as a musician.
- 1740-ca. 1757: Vienna, as follows:
  - 1740-November (?) 1749: the Kapellhaus, quarters for choirboys at St. Stephen’s Cathedral. Haydn sang under the direction of Georg Reutter and continued his musical training.
  - November 1749-Spring/Summer 1750: Following the loss of his soprano voice (hence dismissal from St. Stephens) Haydn shared crowded lodgings with the family of Johann Michael Spangler, a professional singer at the St. Michael's church who had participated in performances with Haydn.
  - 1750- various locations in Vienna, starting out with an unheated garret room in the Michaelerhaus, attached to the Michaelerkirche.
  - Journeys during this period:
    - Shortly after ending his service as a chorister, Haydn made a pilgrimage to Mariazell.
    - Summer 1753: Spent in the spa town of Mannersdorf, in company with his employer and teacher Nicola Porpora. Haydn served Porpora as accompanist and valet; Porpora in turn was serving the mistress of the Venetian ambassador Correr; she was visiting the spa for the summer. At parties hosted by Prince Hildburghausen, Haydn met a number of eminent composers also visiting the spa: Gluck, Wagenseil and Bonno
- 1757–1761: In the employ of Count Morzin. Winters in Vienna, summers at the Count's estate in Dolní Lukavice, often referred to as Lukavec, now in the Czech Republic. For details, including the unclarity of the dates given, see Count Morzin.
- 1761–1766: Vice-Kapellmeister to the Esterházys. In these early years, the Esterházy court spent some of the time in its palace on the Wallnerstrasse in Vienna, some of the time in the family's ancestral seat, Schloss Esterházy, in the small town of Eisenstadt about 40 km. away. Haydn bought a house in Eisenstadt (shown) in 1766, on his promotion to full Kapellmeister.
- 1766–1790: the Esterházy court gradually shifted its time away from the old Vienna-Eisenstadt arrangement to a system involving the new palace at Esterháza, built starting in the 1760s at Fertőd in modern-day Hungary, about 40 km. from Eisenstadt. Initially, Esterháza was visited only during the summer; by 1778 this had expanded to ten months per year; and Haydn sold his house in Eisenstadt. At Esterháza Haydn lived in a house in the grounds of the palace (at Madach sétány 1, now a music museum (Muzsikaház) and gallery).
  - Journeys during this period:
    - In the late 1760s the Esterházy court made various journeys to their palaces in Pressburg (modern-day Bratislava) and at Kittsee, just across the Danube from Pressburg.
    - In the mid-1770s Haydn performed with his orchestra at the palace the Esterházys maintained near Pressburg (today called Bratislava and capital of Slovakia).
- 1790, approx. October–December: following the death of his patron Nikolaus Esterházy on September 28, Haydn settled in Vienna, renting rooms from his friend Johann Nepomuk Hamberger, who was an official in the Lower Austrian government. The address was Wasserkunstbastei no. 1196 (first numbering); entrance on Seilerstätte no. 21. Mrs. Haydn continued to rent rooms from Hamberger during Haydn's absence in London. The building was later inhabited by Beethoven (1801) and was rebuilt in 1805.
- January 1791 – June 1792: London. The city is 1237 km. from Vienna , and thus vastly farther than any other location where Haydn lived.
  - January–May 1791: #18, Great Pulteney Street, a lodging house where Haydn's host and collaborator Johann Peter Salomon also lived. Haydn did his work in a room provided him by the Broadwood piano firm, across the way at #33.
  - May–July 1791. Seeking quiet in which to compose, Haydn moved to a farm in the then rural district of Lisson Grove. Haydn left when the farm was sold in July.
  - August–September 1791. In the country at the home of the banker Nathanael Brassey. From historical records Scott deduces that this was called Roxford, in the village of Hertingfordbury, 21 miles to the north of London in Hertfordshire. Unlike any of the other places where Haydn lived while in England, this home is still standing.
  - Late September 1791. Probably back at #18, Great Pulteney Street.
  - Journeys during this period:
    - July 1791: Oxford, where he was awarded an honorary doctorate by the University in a grand ceremony.
    - End of November 1791: Haydn also visited Cambridge, on his way to the home of Patrick Blake in Langham, Suffolk
    - 14 June 1792: Windsor Castle, then Ascot for the races. The following day to Slough (visit to astronomer/musician William Herschel).
- July 1792 – January 1794: rented lodgings in Vienna
- February 1794 – August 1795: London, #1, Bury Street St. James.
  - Journeys during this period:
    - Starting 9 July 1794: Hampton Court, Gosport, Portsmouth, the Isle of Wight, and Winchester
    - Early August, 1794: Bath and Bristol, .
    - 26 August 1794: on a visit to Sir Charles Rich in Farnham, the ruins of Waverley Abbey
- September 1795 – May 1809: Vienna, as follows
  - September 1795 – 1797: lodgings on the third floor of the Hoföbstlerischen Haus, on the Neuer Markt in the old city
  - 1797–1809: a house Haydn purchased in Windmühle, then a suburb of Vienna, nowadays part of the city's 6th Bezirk, Mariahilf. The address was then Steingasse 73, today it is Haydngasse 19. The house is now a Haydn museum.
  - In Spring 1797, Haydn moved back into the central city for a brief period; his purpose was to be close to Baron Gottfried van Swieten, with whom he was then hard at work on The Creation. This is known from dispatch written by Haydn's friend Frederik Silverstolpe, a Swedish diplomat, who reported Haydn's address as "Krüger-Strasse No. 1075; the house was called der blaue Säbel" ("the Blue Saber").
  - During the earlier years of this period, Haydn also spent summers in Eisenstadt organizing and directing the newly reconstituted Esterházy orchestra.
  - Haydn died in 1809 at his home in Windmühle. His final burial site, where his remains are interred today, was the Bergkirche in Eisenstadt.
