= Crocker's Folly =

Listed former pub in St John's Wood, London, England

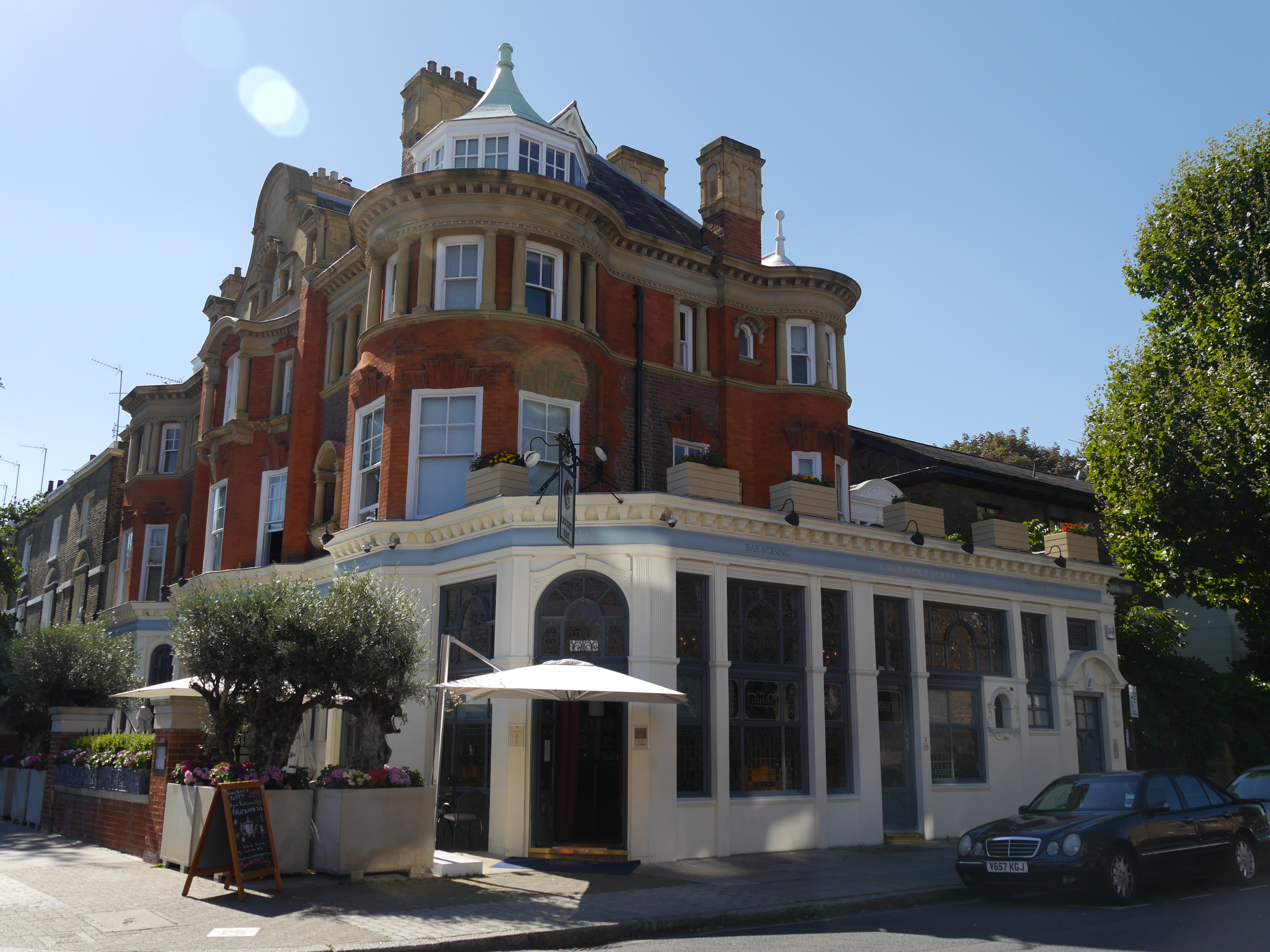
- The pub in 2016

- Location within City of Westminster Location within Greater London
- Former names: The Crown
- Alternative names: Maroush at Crocker's Folly

General information
- Status: Converted to restaurant use
- Type: Public house (former)
- Architectural style: Northern Renaissance
- Location: 24 Aberdeen Place, St John's Wood, London, England
- Coordinates: 51.5259°N 0.1749°W
- Year built: 1898; 128 years ago
- Closed: 2004 (as a pub)
- Client: Frank Crocker
- Owner: Firestone Management Ltd

Design and construction
- Architect: Charles Worley
- Designations

Listed Building – Grade II*
- Official name: Crockers public house
- Designated: 9 January 1970
- Reference no.: 1357150

Website
- Official website

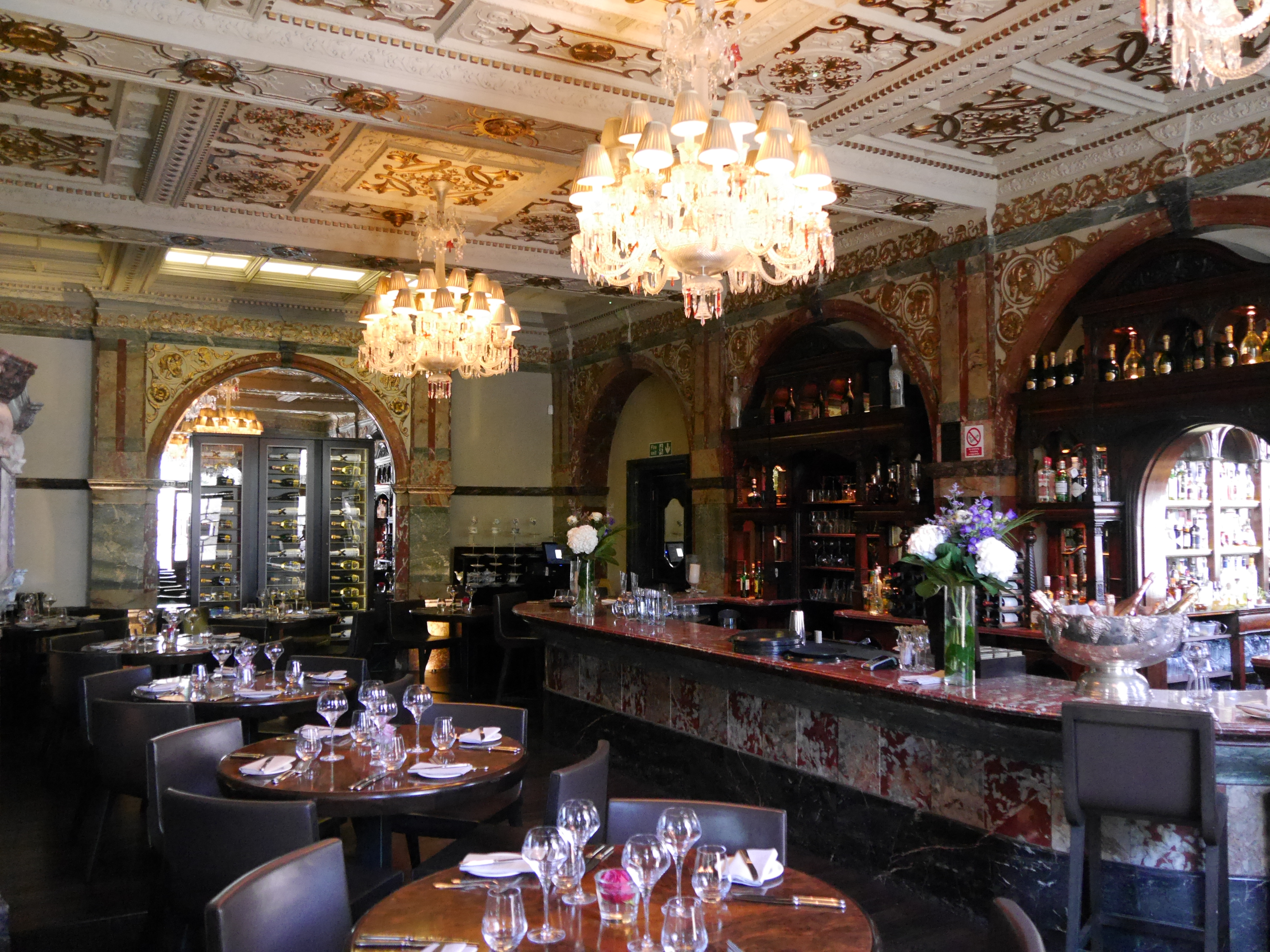
The interior in 2016

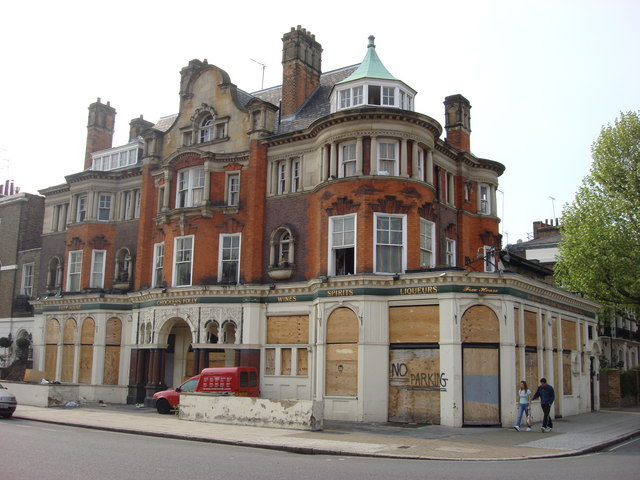
Crocker's Folly, boarded up in 2007

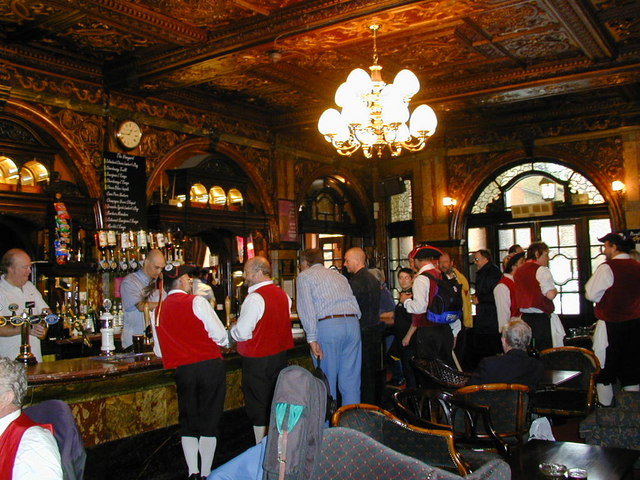
The interior in 2001

Crocker's Folly is a Grade II* listed former public house on Aberdeen Place in St John's Wood, London, England. Built in 1898 as The Crown to designs by Charles Worley in a Northern Renaissance style, it is described in its official listing as dating from around 1900. The building is noted for its elaborate interior, including extensive decorative marble work, and was renamed Crocker's Folly in 1987 after a long-standing nickname. Following its closure as a pub in 2004, it was converted for mixed use and reopened in 2014 as a Lebanese restaurant and bar.

== History ==
The public house was built in 1898 in a Northern Renaissance style, and was previously called The Crown; however, its official listing describes the building as dating from around 1900. Geoff Brandwood and Jane Jephcote's guide to heritage pubs in London describes it as "a truly magnificent pub-cum-hotel" with "superb fittings", including extensive use of marble. The architect was Charles Worley.

=== Frank Crocker ===
In 1987, the pub's name was changed to Crocker's Folly, which had been its nickname for many years. The story was that Frank Crocker, believing he had a reliable tip-off about the site of the new terminus of the Great Central Railway, built the pub on a lavish scale to serve it, however when the terminus was actually built it turned out to be over half a mile away at Marylebone Station – leading to Crocker's ruin, despair and eventual suicide, jumping from the window of an upper floor. In reality, Crocker died in 1904, aged only 41, but of natural causes, although the subsequent landlord, Charles Durden, did kill himself in the way described.

=== Redevelopment ===
The pub closed in autumn 2004, and in November 2011 Westminster City Council gave outline planning consent for the conversion of the three upper floors to residential use. It was noted that the building was on English Heritage's Buildings at Risk Register, and in need of urgent repair.

In February 2014, London Drinker magazine reported that work had begun on the conversion of the upper floors to apartments and that the ground floor would be converted to a restaurant, perhaps with a bar.

In 2014, it was acquired by the Lebanese restaurant group Maroush and reopened in October of that year as a Lebanese restaurant and bar.

== Architecture ==
=== Exterior ===
Constructed of red and darker plum-coloured brick with stone detailing, the building has a slate roof and is designed in a Northern Renaissance style. It rises to three storeys with attic accommodation and has an irregular frontage centred on a prominent curved section topped by an ornamental gable. To one side is a projecting bay window extending through the full height of the building, while the corner is marked by a rounded turret with a copper roof. The main entrance projects slightly from the frontage and is framed by paired marble columns and decorative plasterwork.

The upper floors contain sash windows beneath decorative mouldings, with further stone ornamentation, columns and recessed arches adding richness to the façade. The central section is emphasised by a large shaped gable incorporating a Venetian window, while tall chimneys rise above the steeply pitched roof.

=== Interior ===
The principal room, originally known as the "grand saloon", is noted for its lavish decoration. Around 50 varieties of marble were used throughout the space, including for the bar counter, fireplace, archways, walls and chimney breast. Paired Corinthian marble pilasters support a partly gilded beamed ceiling, while the interior also retains extensive decorative features including wood panelling, plasterwork and ornamental detailing.

== See also ==
- Grade II* listed buildings in the City of Westminster (A–Z)
