= Aberdeen Place =

Street in St John's Wood, London

Coordinates: 51.525630°N 0.17535648°W

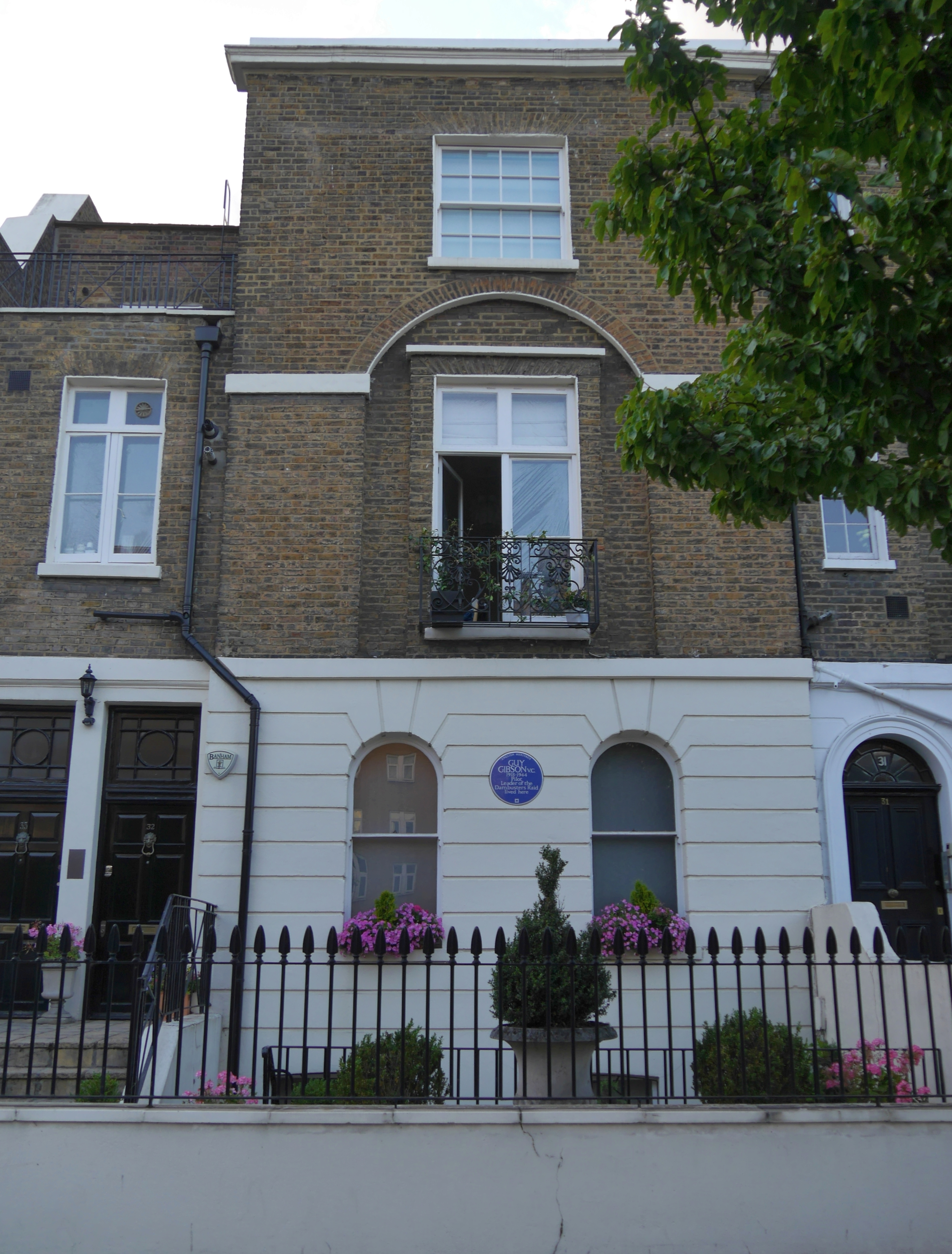
32 Aberdeen Place, London, the former residence of Guy Gibson

Aberdeen Place is a street in St John's Wood, London. It was laid out after 1823 on the site of a farm once owned by the wealthy yeoman John Lyon, who founded Harrow School in 1571. The farm was located in the former Lisson Manor and was held by the governors of the school, with the proceeds going towards the maintenance of Harrow Road between Harrow and London. The farm was built over from 1823 onwards with the newly constructed streets being named after governors of Harrow School. In the case of Aberdeen Place, it was named after George Hamilton-Gordon, 4th Earl of Aberdeen, who had gone to school at Harrow and was Prime Minister from 1852 to 1855.

== Notable buildings and residents ==
- 23-24 is Crocker's Folly, a Grade II* listed public house.
- 25-33 are a Grade II listed early-mid 19th century terrace.
  - 32 is the former residence of Wing Commander Guy Gibson, leader of the Dambusters raid in 1943.

== Notable residents ==
- Guy Gibson (1918–1944), Leader of the Dambusters Raid (No. 32)
- James William Wild (1814–1892), architect, built his own house, the Arab Studio (No. 18)
