= Wimpole House =

Building in Westminster, London, England

Coordinates: 51°31′08″N 0°08′54″W

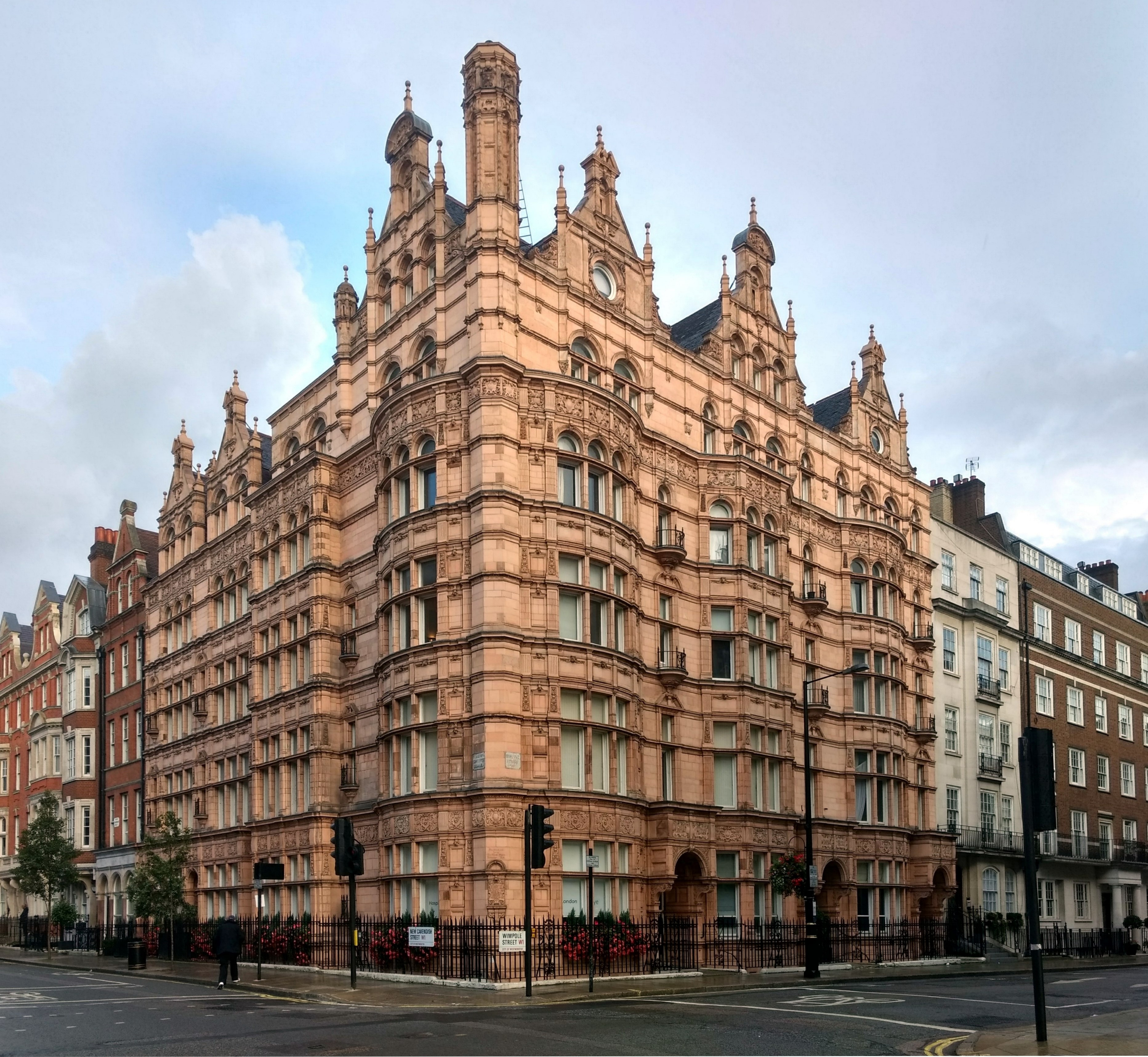
Wimpole House

Wimpole House at 28–29a Wimpole Street is a group of Grade II listed town houses on the corner of Wimpole Street and New Cavendish Street in the City of Westminster, London.

The building was designed by Charles Worley in a Flemish renaissance style and built in 1892–93 as a speculation for Samuel Lithgow, whose legal practice was based in Wimpole Street and centred on Marylebone. The foundation stone was laid by his mother, Mary Mason Lithgow, in September 1892. When it was complete, Lithgow moved his business there and let some of the rooms to medical practitioners, but most of the building was used as a nursing home until 1940, when the proprietor, a Miss Lancaster, died.

It was described in Nikolaus Pevsner's Buildings of England as a "somewhat ridiculous pink terracotta pile".
