= Samuel Lithgow =

British solicitor and property developer

Samuel Lithgow CBE (1860 – 9 September 1937) was a British solicitor and property developer in Marylebone, London. He was a councillor of the London County Council and in 1891 founded the Stanhope Institute for Working Men and Women in Stanhope Street.

== Career ==
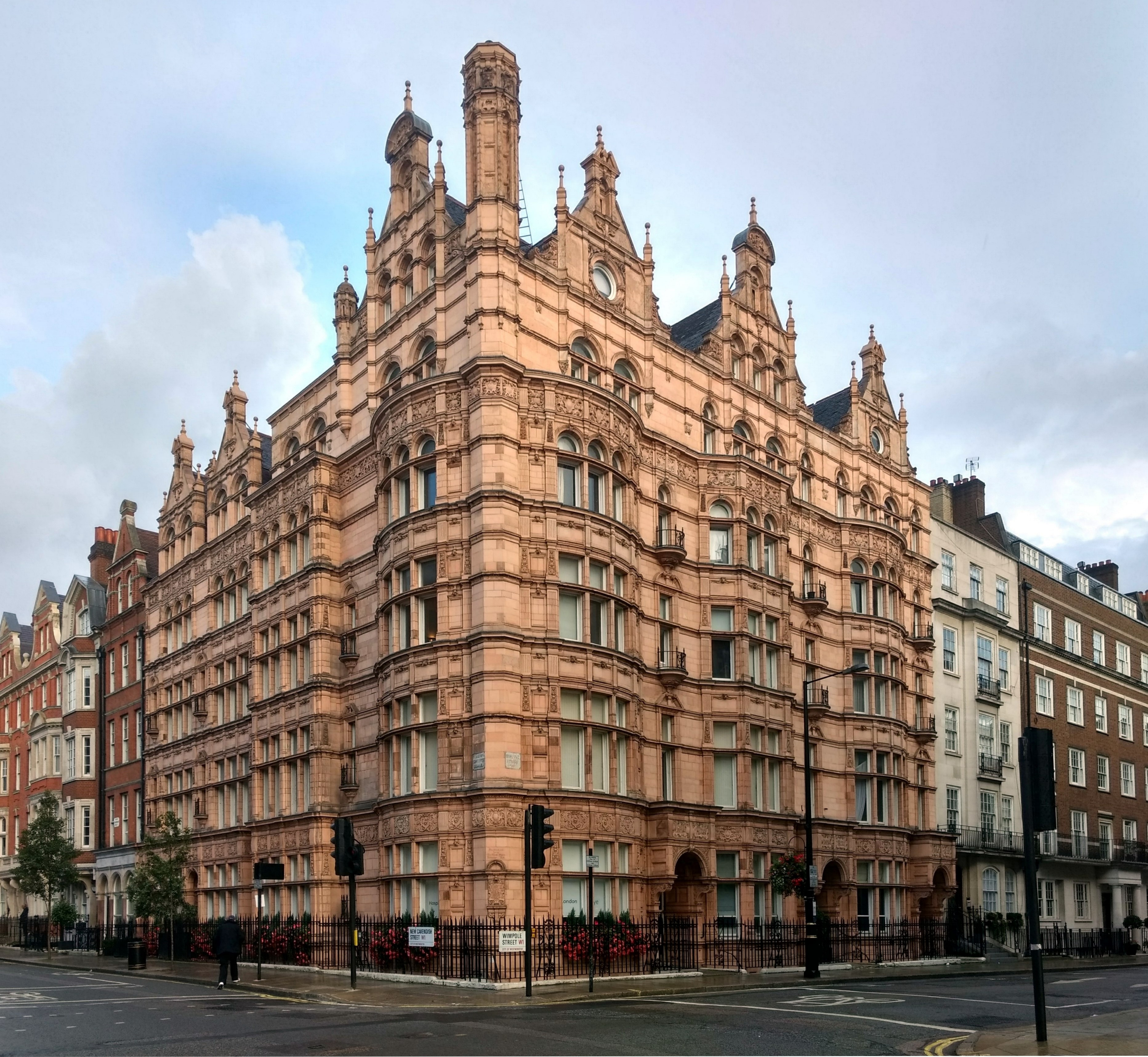
Wimpole House

Lithgow was admitted as a solicitor in 1882 and later practiced as Messrs. Lithgow and Pepper, from 41 Wimpole Street.

=== Property development ===
Lithgow was active in property development in the Marylebone area of London. Among his notable developments was Wimpole House on the corner of Wimpole Street and New Cavendish Street at 28-29a Wimpole which was built for him as a speculative development in 1892–93 to a design by Charles Worley. The foundation stone was laid by his mother Mary Mason Lithgow in September 1892. When it was complete, Lithgow moved his business there and let some of the rooms to medical practitioners but most of the building was used as a nursing home until 1940 when the proprietor, a Miss Lancaster, died.

=== Politics and public service ===
Lithgow represented the West St Pancras ward on the London County Council from 1910 to 1913. He was a justice of the peace and chairman of the St. Marylebone and Paddington Local Employment and Juvenile Advisory Committees.

In 1891 he founded the Stanhope Institute for Working Men and Women, Stanhope Street. He was a governor of the North West London Polytechnic.

He was appointed CBE in 1928.

== Personal life ==
In 1894, Lithgow married Jessie Esther, second daughter of Patrick David Grieve, of the Royal Bank of Scotland. They had two sons Douglas and Lawrence.

== Death and legacy ==
Lithgow died on 9 September 1937 in a nursing home at Norwich after an operation. A memorial service was held at St John's Church, Hyde Park Crescent. His residence at the time of his death was stated to be 41 Wimpole Street and Thelverton Grange, Diss, Norfolk, but he also had homes at various times at 30 Oxford Square, London, and Studland, Dorset. He left an estate of £76,050.
