= Wimpole Street =

Street in London, England

Coordinates: 51°31′10″N 0°08′56″W

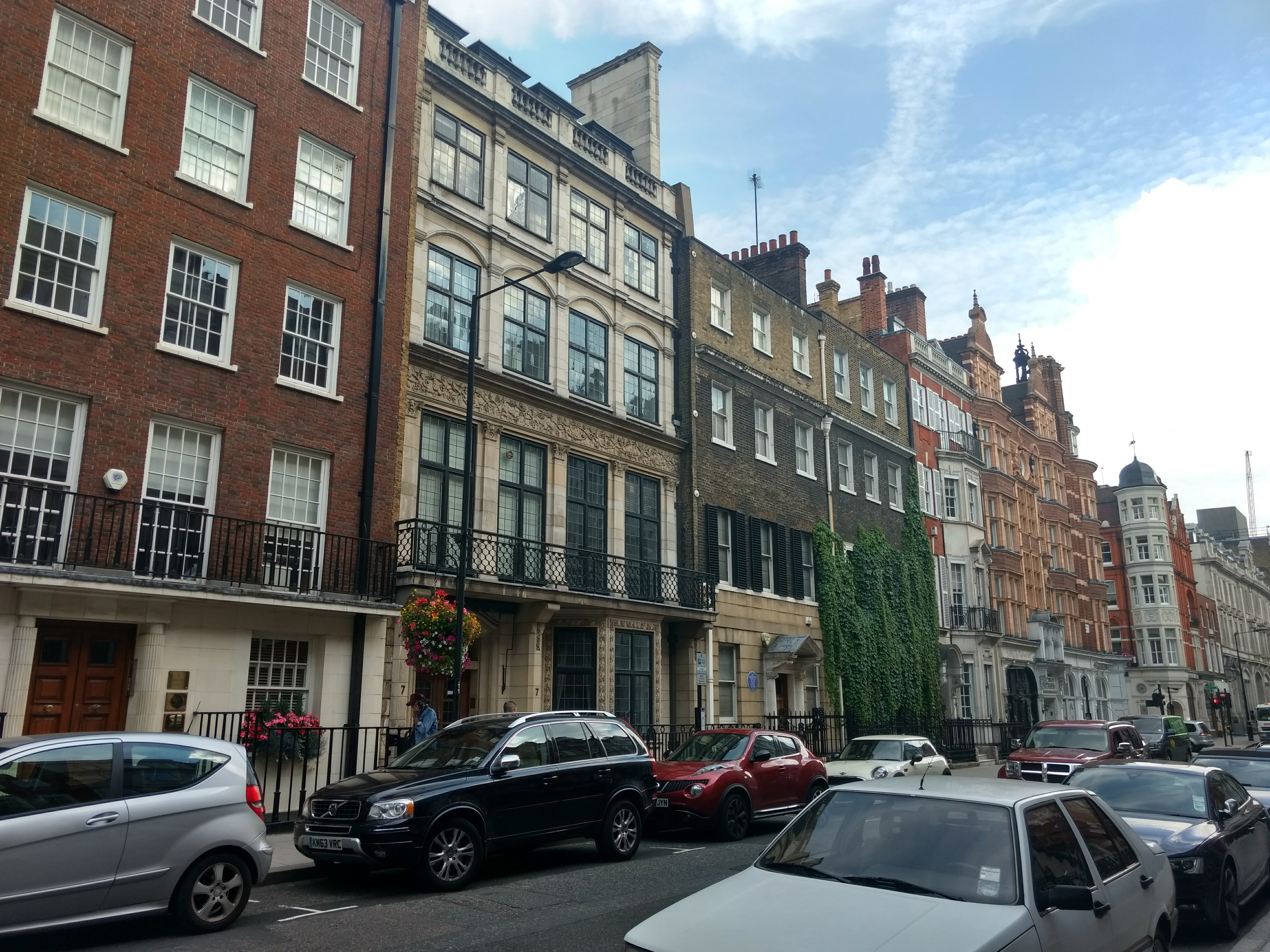
Wimpole Street, looking south

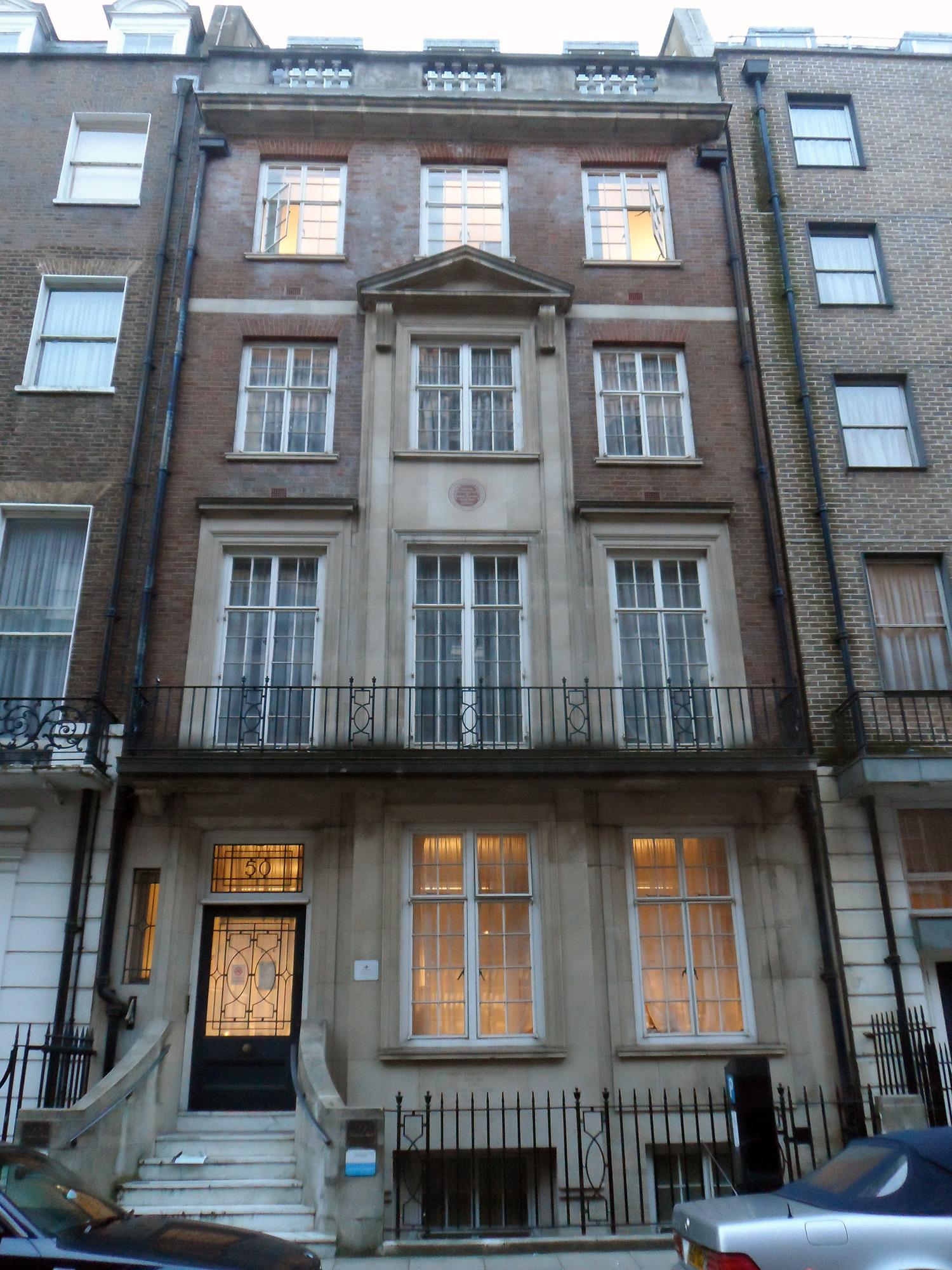
50 Wimpole Street, the setting of Rudolf Besier's play The Barretts of Wimpole Street (1930)

Wimpole Street is a street in Marylebone, City of Westminster, in London. It is associated with private medical practice and medical associations and has had several notable residents.

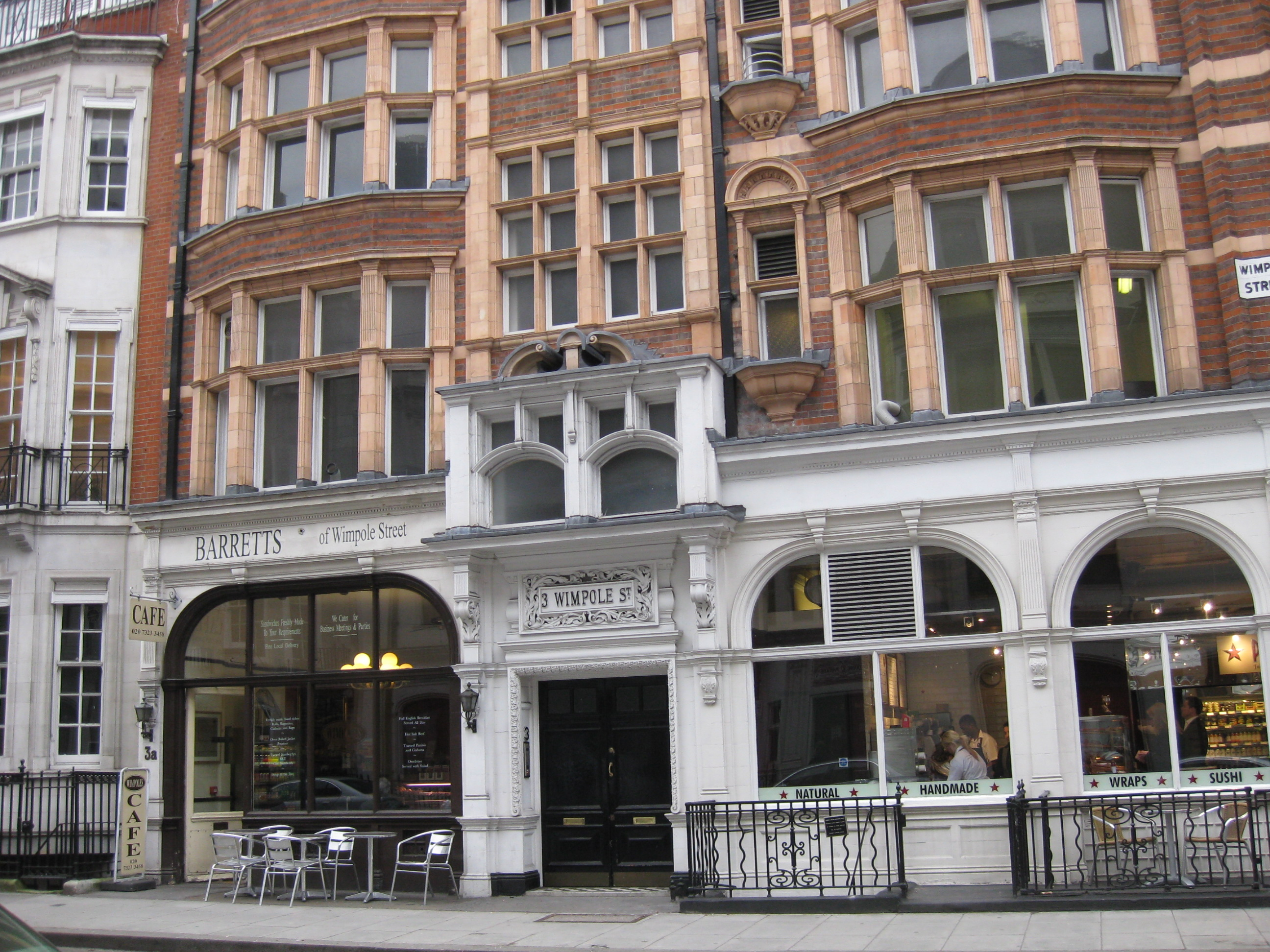
Cafe at No. 3a

== History ==
The name Wimpole comes from the Wimpole Estate in Cambridgeshire, which in the 18th century was the seat of the Harley family, who developed the street.

On the corner of Wimpole and Wigmore Street a landmark legal case took place about causing a nuisance between neighbours, in Sturges v Bridgman (1879), which was decided by the Court of Appeal of England and Wales.

Arthur Conan Doyle, who created the character of Sherlock Holmes, worked and wrote in 2 Upper Wimpole Street in 1891. A green plaque has been installed to commemorate the cultural heritage of the City of Westminster.

=== November 1935 fire ===
At 6.30am on 10 November 1935, there was a fire at No. 27, where five people died. It was the house of dental surgeon and otorhinolaryngologist, Philip Julius Franklin. Franklin had been born in the United States in 1878, the son of Julius Franklin of San Francisco. He and his wife, Ethel Julia White of 127 Portsdown Road, had been married on 18 February 1903, at the New West End Synagogue, by Hermann Adler, the chief rabbi of the UK.

Franklin had trained at King's College Hospital Medical School. His wife, 55-year-old Ethel was killed. Franklin worked with the Royal Society of Medicine in the laryngology section, and worked in a clinic on Vincent Square. His son, Alfred White Franklin, later deduced the prevalence of child abuse in the UK. Philip died in January 1951.

On 11 November 1935 The Times published a letter by dentist N J MacDonald of 58a Wimpole Street. On 9 December 1935, the fire was discussed in Parliament, where it was raised by the Conservative MP Alec Cunningham-Reid.

== The houses and the notable people who have lived and worked here ==
=== No. 1 ===
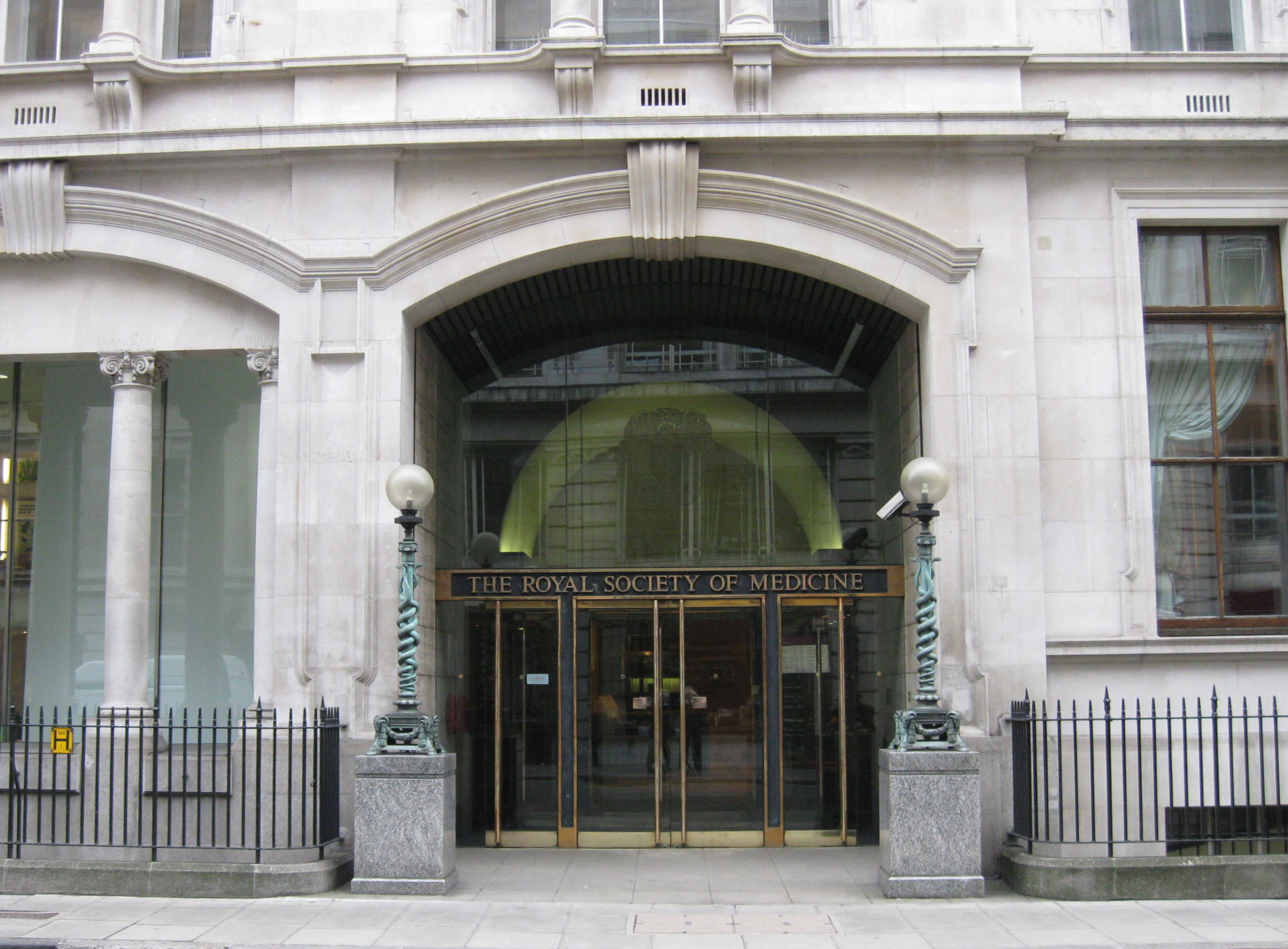
Royal Society of Medicine at No. 1

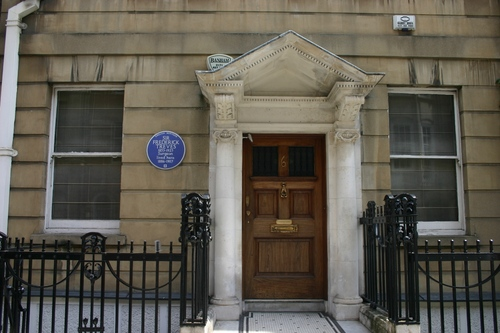
Ground floor of No. 6, with blue plaque commemorating Sir Frederick Treves

No. 1 is an example of Edwardian baroque architecture, completed in 1912 by architects John Belcher and J. J. Joass as the home of the Royal Society of Medicine.

=== No. 4 ===
John James Audubon (1785–1851), French-American artist, entrepreneur, naturalist, explorer, and ornithologist, lived at No. 4 in the 1820s and 1830s. The house was rebuilt in 1910–11; the architect was W Henry White.

=== No. 5 ===
No. 5 is Grade II listed. Edward Nettleship (1845–1913), ophthalmologist, lived there in the 1880s and 1890s.

=== No. 6 ===
No. 6 is Grade II listed. Sir Charles Scudamore (1779–1849), medical doctor known for his writings on gout, lived at No. 6 and died there. Sir Frederick Treves, 1st Baronet (1853 –1923), a prominent surgeon, and an expert in anatomy, was a later resident. Treves was renowned for his surgical treatment of appendicitis, and is credited with saving the life of King Edward VII in 1902. He is also widely known for his friendship with Joseph Merrick, dubbed the "Elephant Man" for his severe deformities.

=== No. 7 ===
No. 7, which was rebuilt in 1912–13, is Grade II listed. Josephine Barnes (1912–1999), obstetrician and gynaecologist who was the first female president of the British Medical Association (1979–80), practised at No. 7.

=== No. 10 ===
No. 10 is Grade II listed. Sir Thomas Barlow (1845–1945), physician known for his research on infantile scurvy, lived here. He was Royal Physician to Queen Victoria, attending her on her death, and to Kings Edward VII and George V. Barlow died at No. 10 on 12 January 1945, aged 99.

=== No. 11 ===
Sir Henry Goldfinch (1781–1854), officer in the Royal Engineers who served during the Peninsular War of 1807 to 1814, ending his career as one of the colonels commandant of the Corps of Royal Engineers, lived here.

=== No. 12 ===
Aleck William Bourne (1886–1974), gynaecologist and writer, lived and practised at No. 12.

=== No. 13 ===
No. 13 is Grade II listed. Augustus Joseph Pepper (1849–1935), surgeon and forensic pathologist, lived and practised there.

=== No. 14 ===
No. 14 is Grade II listed.

=== No. 15 ===
No. 15 is Grade II listed.

=== No. 16 ===
No. 16 is Grade II listed.

=== No. 17 ===
No. 17 is Grade II listed.

=== No. 18 ===
No. 18 is Grade II listed.

=== No. 19 ===
No. 19 is Grade II listed. Sir Rickman Godlee (see entry at No. 81) lived and practised at No. 19 from the 1890s to the 1910s.

=== No. 20 ===
No. 20 is Grade II listed. Ethel Gordon Fenwick (née Manson; 1857–1947), nurse, who played a major role in the history of nursing in the United Kingdom, lived here. She founded the Royal British Nurses' Association in 1887. In 1999 an English Heritage blue plaque was attached to her former home.

=== No. 21 ===
Sir James Berry (1860–1946), surgeon, who was President of the Medical Society of London, 1921–22 and President of the Royal Society of Medicine, 1926–28, lived at No. 21.

=== No. 22 ===
Samuel Osborne Habershon (1825–1889), physician, lived and practised at No. 22.

=== No. 23 ===
No. 23 is Grade II listed.

=== No. 24 ===
No. 24 is Grade II listed.

=== No. 26 ===
Sir George Henry Savage (1842–1921), psychiatrist, lived and died at No. 26.

=== Nos. 28, 29 and 29a ===
Wimpole House at Nos. 28–29a is a group of three Grade II listed town houses at the street's junction with New Cavendish Street. The building was designed by Charles Worley in a Flemish renaissance style and built in 1892–93 as a speculation for Samuel Lithgow, whose legal practice was based in Wimpole Street and centred on Marylebone. The foundation stone was laid by his mother, Mary Mason Lithgow, in September 1892. When it was complete, Lithgow moved his business there and let some of the rooms to medical practitioners, but most of the building was used as a nursing home until 1940, when the proprietor died.

=== No. 30 ===
No. 30 is Grade II listed. Its past residents include Marcus Beck (1843–1893), professor of surgery at University College Hospital and an early proponent of the germ theory of disease, and George Vivian Poore (1843–1904), physician and writer.

=== No. 30A ===
No. 30A is Grade II listed.

=== No. 30B ===
No. 30B is Grade II listed.

=== No. 31 ===
No. 31 is Grade II listed.

=== No. 33 ===
No. 33 is Grade II listed.

=== No. 34 ===
No. 34 is Grade II listed.

=== No. 35 ===
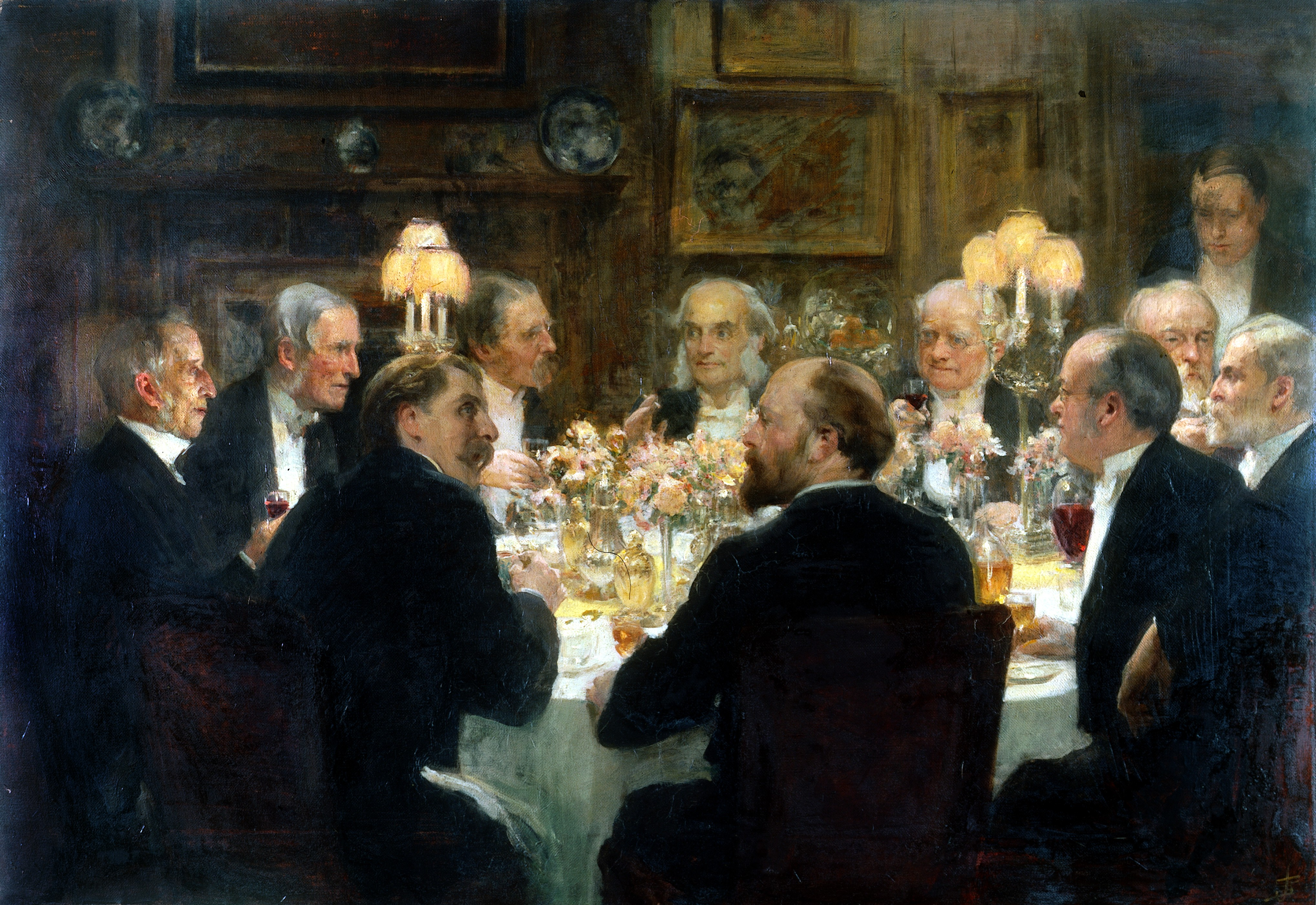
An Octave for Mr Ernest Hart at Sir Henry Thompson's house: oil painting (c.1897) by Solomon Joseph Solomon. Octaves were dinner-parties held by Sir Henry Thompson, Professor of Surgery at University College, London, at his house, 35 Wimpole Street, at which eight courses, accompanied by eight wines, were served at eight o'clock to eight guests in addition to the host and the guest of honour. The guest of honour here, seated to the right of the mantelpiece, was Ernest Hart, editor of the British Medical Journal. The room contains works of art from Thompson's collection including paintings by well-known artists of his acquaintance.

No. 35 is Grade II listed.

Sir Henry Thompson (1820–1904), surgeon and polymath and his wife, pianist and composer Kate Loder (1825–1904), composer and pianist, lived here. The first complete English performance of Brahms' Ein deutsches Requiem was performed on 10 July 1871 at No. 35, Loder's private residence from 1851. The arrangement, which came to be known as "the London version", was for piano duet (played by Loder and Cipriani Potter) with soloists and choir. Around 30 voices were used in the performance.

It was later the home of the poet Edward James (1907–1984), known for his patronage of the surrealist art movement, and his wife Tilly Losch (1903–1975), dancer, choreographer, actress, and painter. The Belgian Surrealist artist, René Magritte, stayed at the house in 1937. Magritte studied architecture and painted there. James is featured in two of Magritte's 1937 paintings, Le Principe du Plaisir (The Pleasure Principle) and La Reproduction Interdite, also known as Not to Be Reproduced.

=== No. 36 ===
No. 36 is Grade II listed. English Heritage placed a blue plaque at the house in 1988 to show that Evelyn Baring, 1st Earl of Cromer (1841–1917), statesman, diplomat and colonial administrator, lived and died here. This house was also the home of Octavius Wigram (1794–1878) from 1824 to 1830. He was a businessman and ship owner in the City of London, a member of Lloyd's and Governor of the Royal Exchange Assurance Corporation.

=== No. 37 ===
No. 37 was the townhouse of William Mayne, 1st Baron Newhaven (1722–1794), who was known as Sir William Mayne, Bt, from 1763 to 1776. Mayne was a British merchant and politician who sat in the House of Commons from 1774 to 1790. John Sims, a medical doctor and botanist, who was the first editor of Curtis's Botanical Magazine, lived at No. 37 in the 1820s.

The house was rebuilt after its destruction in the Second World War and is now used as offices for the General Dental Council.

=== No. 39 ===
No. 39 is Grade II listed. Sir John Charles Bucknill (1817–1897), psychiatrist and mental health reformer, lived at the house. Sir Felix Semon (1849–1921), a German-British pioneer in neurobiology and a prominent laryngologist, later lived at No. 39 and also practised medicine there.

=== No. 40 ===
Sir Ernest Gordon Graham Graham-Little (1867–1950), dermatologist and MP for London University (1924–1950), lived at No. 40, which was destroyed during the London Blitz.

=== No. 42 ===
No. 42 is Grade II listed.

=== No. 43 ===
No. 43 is Grade II listed.

=== No. 44 ===
No. 44 is Grade II listed. James Samuel Risien Russell (1863–1939), Guyanese-British physician, neurologist, professor of medicine, and professor of medical jurisprudence, lived here.

=== No. 45 ===
No. 45 is Grade II listed.

=== No. 46 ===
No. 46 is Grade II listed.

=== No. 47 ===
No. 47 is Grade II listed. Sir William Milbourne James (1807–1881), Judge of the Court of Appeal in Chancery and the Judicial Committee of the Privy Council, lived here.

=== No. 48 ===
No. 48 is Grade II listed. George Fielding Blandford (1829–1911), psychiatrist, practised medicine at No. 48.

=== No. 50 ===
The poet Elizabeth Barrett (1806–1861) was one of the residents most associated with the street. She lived at No. 50 with her family from 1838 until 1846 when she eloped with Robert Browning. The street became famous from the play based on their courtship, The Barretts of Wimpole Street.

=== No. 51 ===
No. 51 is Grade II listed.

=== No. 54 ===
No. 54 is Grade II listed.

=== No. 55 ===
No. 55 is Grade II listed.

=== No. 56 ===
No. 56 is Grade II listed. The physician Thomas Mayo (1790–1871) lived there from 1835.

=== No. 57 ===
Dr. David Rowlands' home at No. 57 (also the former home of Paul McCartney)

No. 57, now a private clinic, is Grade II listed. David Rowlands (1778–1846), naval surgeon, who became the Inspector of H.M. Hospital and Fleets for the Royal Navy, lived and died here.

Later it became the home of Richard Asher (1912–1969), endocrinologist and haematologist, his wife Margaret Eliot (1914–2011), a musician who taught oboe at the Guildhall School of Music and Drama, their son Peter Asher (born 1944), who was one half of the pop duo Peter & Gordon and a successful music producer, and their daughter Jane Asher (born 1946), an actress. Jane was, in the mid-1960s, the girlfriend of Paul McCartney, who lived there for nearly three years. John Lennon and Paul McCartney wrote "I Want to Hold Your Hand" in No. 57's front basement room, while McCartney wrote the tune to "Yesterday" in a box room at the top of the house.

=== No. 59 ===
Ivor Walsworth (1909–1978), composer, violinist, BBC sound engineer and music producer, lived with his wife, concert pianist Joan Davies (1912–1982) at No. 59 in the 1960s and 1970s.

=== No. 61 ===
No. 61 is Grade II listed. John Wood (1825–1891), surgeon at King's College Hospital, lived at No. 61 and died there.

=== No. 62 ===
No. 62 is Grade II listed. Sir Richard Douglas Powell (1842–1925), Physician Royal to Queen Victoria, King Edward VII and King George V, lived at No. 62 and also ran his medical practice there.

=== No. 64 ===
Sir Robert Walter Carden, 1st Baronet (1801–1888), banker and Conservative politician, lived here. Sir St Clair Thomson (1859–1943), surgeon and professor of laryngology, lived and practised at No. 64 from the 1910s until the 1940s, when it was damaged during an air raid. Until 2025 the rebuilt building was the headquarters of the British Dental Association.

=== No. 67 ===
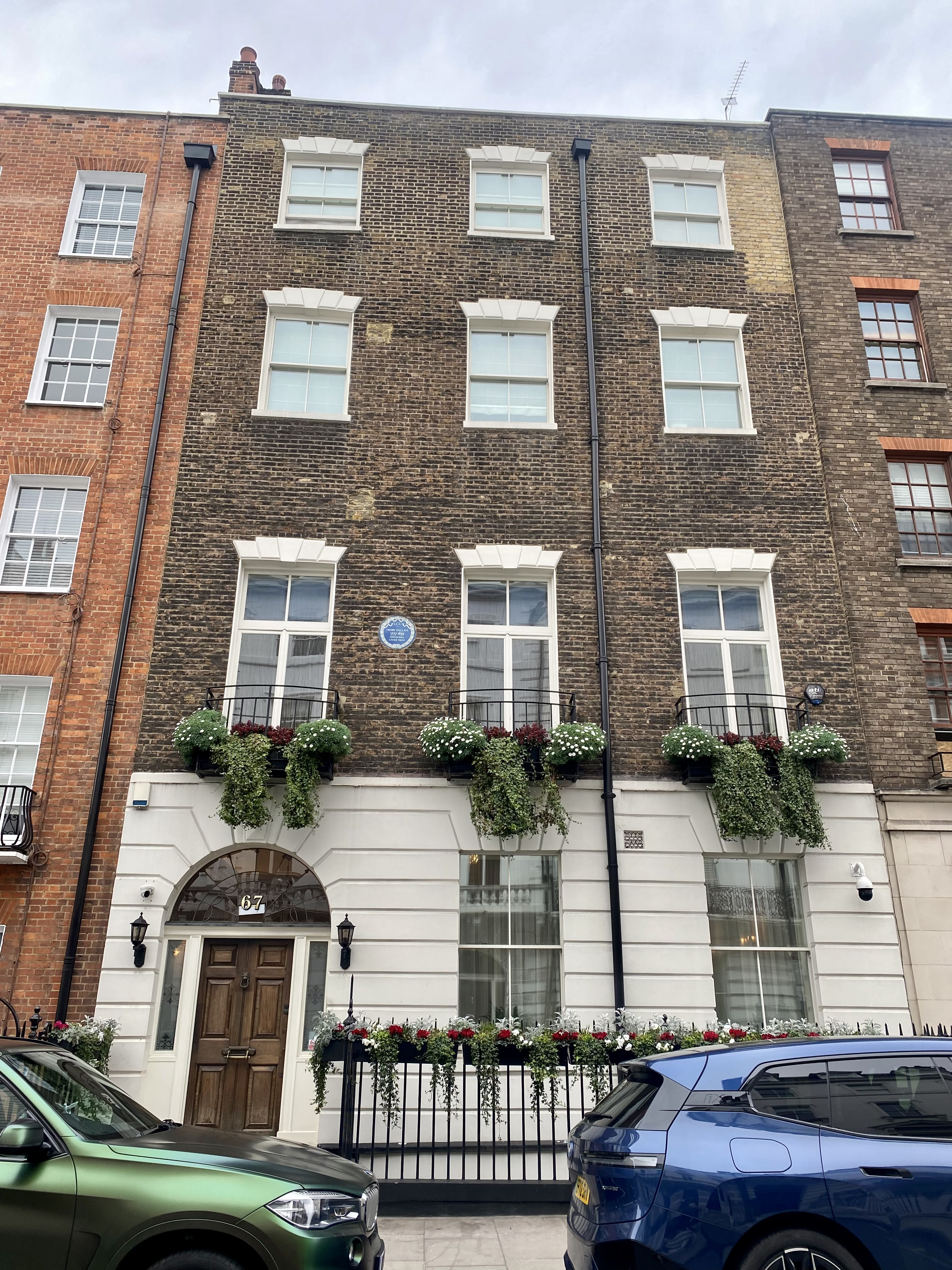
On the first floor facade of No. 67 there is a blue plaque commemorating Henry Hallam

No. 67 is Grade II listed. Henry Hallam (1777–1859), historian, lived here from 1819. His residency at the house is commemorated by a London County Council blue plaque.

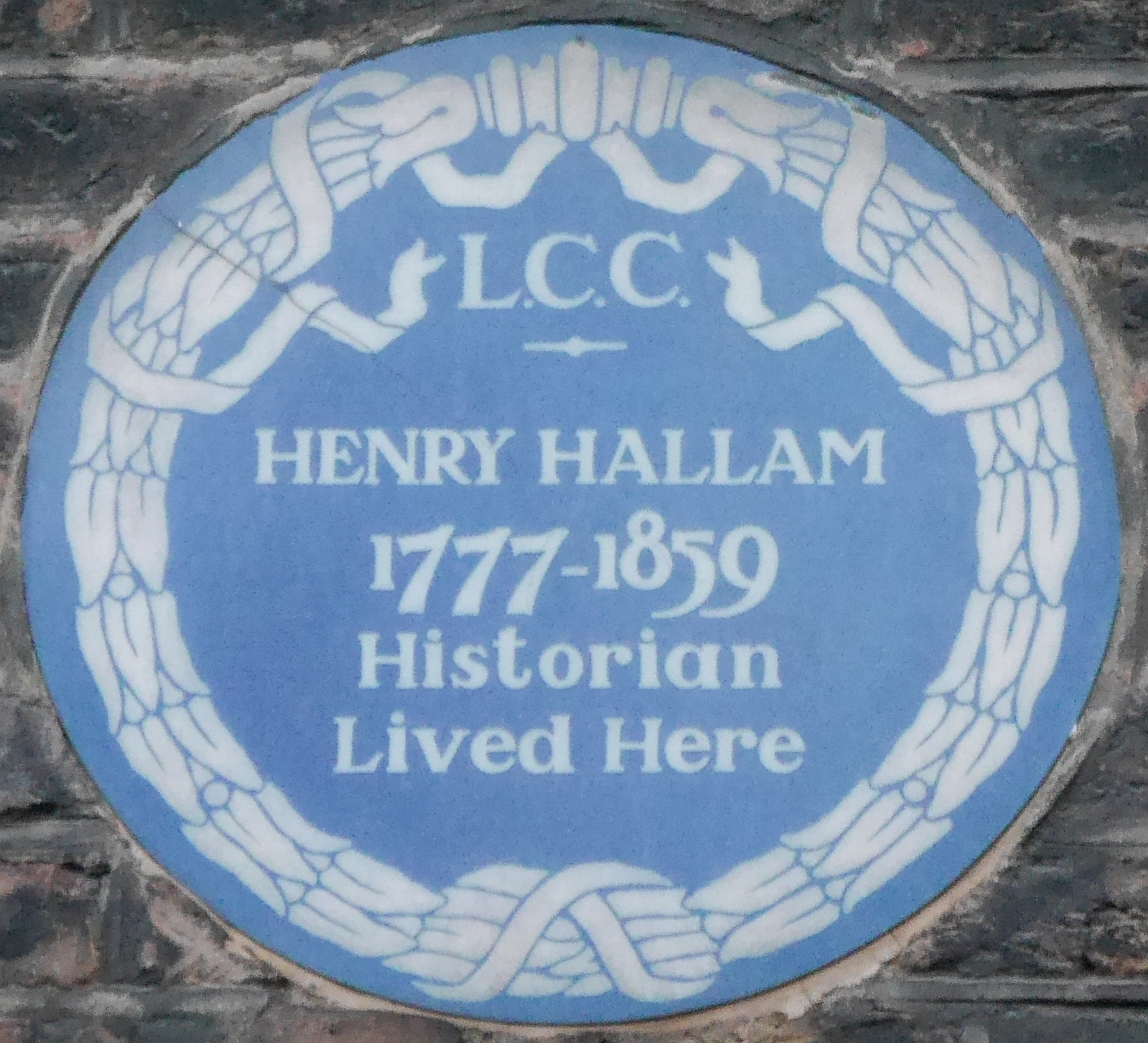
No. 67's blue plaque

=== No. 68 ===
Mia Lilly Kellmer Pringle (1920–1983), Austrian-born child psychologist, who was the founding director of the National Children's Bureau and wrote many books and articles about early childhood development, committed suicide in her flat at No. 68.

=== No. 69 ===
No. 69 is Grade II listed.

=== No. 70 ===
No. 70 is Grade II listed.

=== No. 71 ===
No. 71 is Grade II listed.

=== No. 75 ===
No. 75 is Grade II listed.

=== No. 76 ===
James John Garth Wilkinson (1812–1899), homeopathic physician, social reformer, translator and editor of Swedenborg's works, and a writer on Swedenborgian topics, practised homeopathic medicine at No. 76 from the 1830s to the 1880s.

=== No. 78 ===
No. 78 is Grade II listed.

=== No. 81 ===
Sir Rickman Godlee (1849–1925), surgeon to Queen Victoria's household and one of the first doctors to surgically remove a brain tumour, lived and practised at No. 81 in the 1880s.

=== No. 82 ===
Charles-Édouard Brown-Séquard (1817–1894), Mauritian physiologist and neurologist who, in 1850, became the first to describe what is now called Brown-Séquard syndrome, lived here. No. 82 was also the home from early 1888 to September 1889 of Wilkie Collins (1824–1889), the novelist and playwright whose most famous work is The Woman in White (1860). The house was rebuilt in the 1920s.

=== No. 85 ===
No. 85 is Grade II listed. Octavius Sturges (1833–1894), paediatrician, practised there from the early 1870s until his death.

=== No. 86 ===
No. 86 is Grade II listed.

=== No. 87 ===
No. 87 is Grade II listed.

=== No. 94 ===
At No. 94, in 1932, Marjorie Abbatt (1899–1991) and her husband Paul opened a toy shop, Paul & Marjorie Abbatt Ltd, designed by their friend, the architect Ernő Goldfinger. The shop was unique in that children were allowed to touch and play with the displayed toys.

== In popular culture ==
In Jane Austen's novel Mansfield Park, James and Maria (Bertram) Rushworth live in Wimpole Street.

Rudolph Besier's play The Barretts of Wimpole Street (1930) was adapted into films of the same name in 1934 and 1957.

In Flush: A Biography (1933), her imaginative biography of Elizabeth Barrett Browning's cocker spaniel, blending fiction and non-fiction, Virginia Woolf describes Wimpole Street as " the most august of London streets, the most impersonal. Indeed, when the world seems tumbling to ruin, and civilisation rocks on its foundations, one has only to go to Wimpole Street...".

The street was also given as the home of Henry Higgins by George Bernard Shaw in his play Pygmalion (1913) and in the musical adaptation My Fair Lady (1956), with 27a given as the address. (No. 75 was the inspiration for the 1964 movie set design.)

22a Wimpole Street is referenced in the Monty Python sketch "Secret Service Dentists".

== See also ==
- Wimpole House
- Wimpole Mews, an adjoining road famous for its links with the Profumo affair
- Harley Street, also associated with private medicine
- Healthcare in London
