= David Rowlands (surgeon) =

Welsh naval surgeon

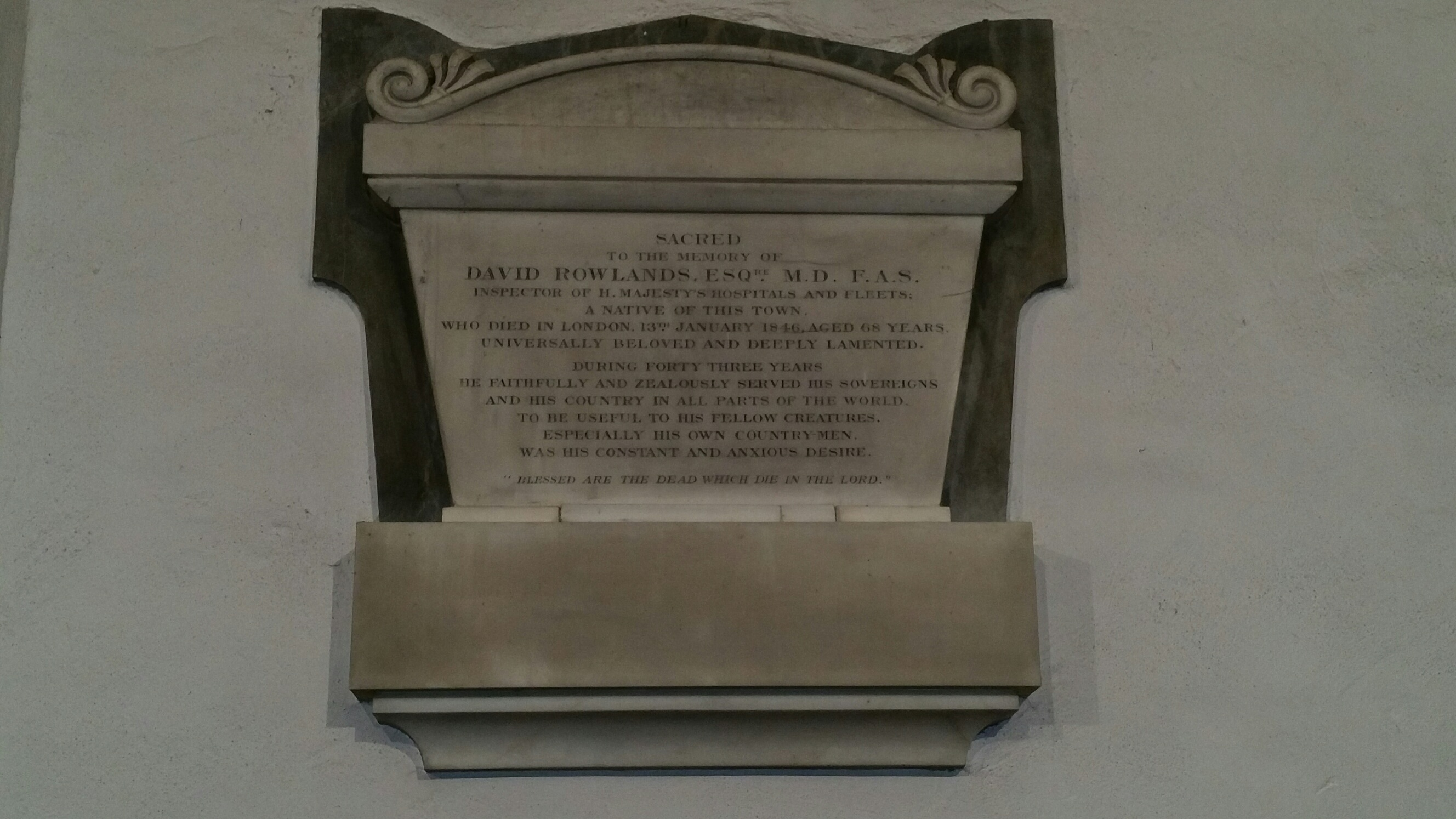
Dr. David Rowlands Monument, St. Mary's Church, Cardigan, Wales

David D. Rowlands FRS FSA (1778–1846) was a Welsh naval surgeon, who became the Inspector of H.M. Hospital and Fleets for the Royal Navy. He had the distinction of being the Surgeon for the Royal Navy at Halifax when he treated the wounded of HMS Shannon, including Captain Philip Broke, after the renown Capture of USS Chesapeake during the War of 1812. He was a Fellow of the Royal Society and a Fellow of the Antiquarian Society. He also supported the Governesses' Benevolent Institution in London (1844).

== Career ==
Rowlands was born in Llanfihangel Penbedw. On 18 July 1795, Rowlands was assigned to be a surgeon. He was the surgeon on ship Royal William before being posted to Halifax. He became Hospital Surgeon at Halifax on 11 March 1812.

Dr. Rowlands' patient Sir Philip Broke after his victory over USS Chesapeake

He was the surgeon at Halifax when the wounded arrived from the capture of Chesapeake by HMS Shannon on 1 June 1813. Captain Broke received a deep cut to his scalp from a sabre. On 6 June Shannon arrived in Halifax and the following day the surgeon of Shannon, Alexander Jack, recorded that Broke was cared for at the house of the Commissioner the Hon. Philip Wodehouse and the care fell upon Dr. Rowlands, the Surgeon, Royal Naval Hospital. (He reports that Rowlands was assisted by Duncan Clarke.) Rowlands reported:

"I found Broke in a very weak state, with an extensive sabre wound on the side of the head, the brain exposed to view of three inches or more; he was unable to converse save in monosyllables."

Three weeks later at Halifax, 26 June 1813, Broke wrote his wife,

"Dr. Rowland thinks it best not to hurry the closing up of my wound in the head, but it will, I think, be covered in a week more."

In 1819, after Halifax, he was posted to the Chatham Dockyard in January 1820 to 1838 and the Sheerness Dockyard (1831).

On 23 November 1841 he was assigned Inspector of H.R. Hospitals and Fleets. He lived at No. 28 Grosvenor Place until 1845.

Rowlands died at his home No. 57 Wimpole Street, London, and was buried in the tomb of his parents at St. Mary's Church (1846). He also has a tablet to his memory in the church.

== Family ==
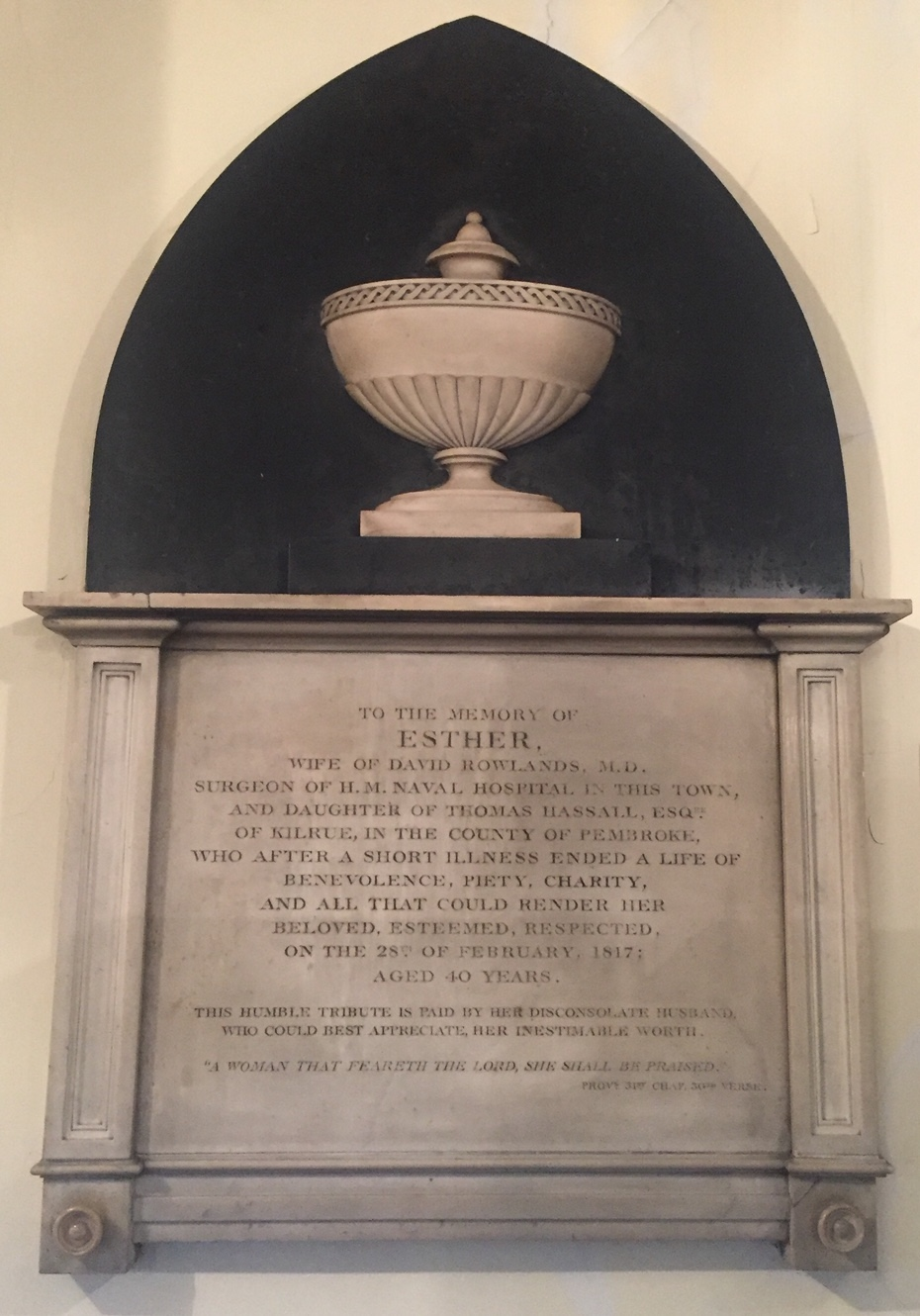
Monument to Rowland's first wife Esther, St. Paul's Church (Halifax), Nova Scotia

He married Esther Hassel at Llanfihangel Penbedw, near Cardigan on 2 May 1812. He then returned with her to Halifax, where he was the Surgeon of the Naval Hospital. She died five years later and he purchased a monument for his wife Esther in the St. Paul's Church (Halifax). He married two more times.

He purchased a silver plate for his sister that is in St Llwchaiarn's Church, Llanllwchaiarn (1832).

He was later recorded as a "pluralist", holding two or more pensions or offices, which led to him being recorded in The Black Book Or Corruption Unmasked.

== See also ==
- Royal Navy Medical Service

== Gallery ==
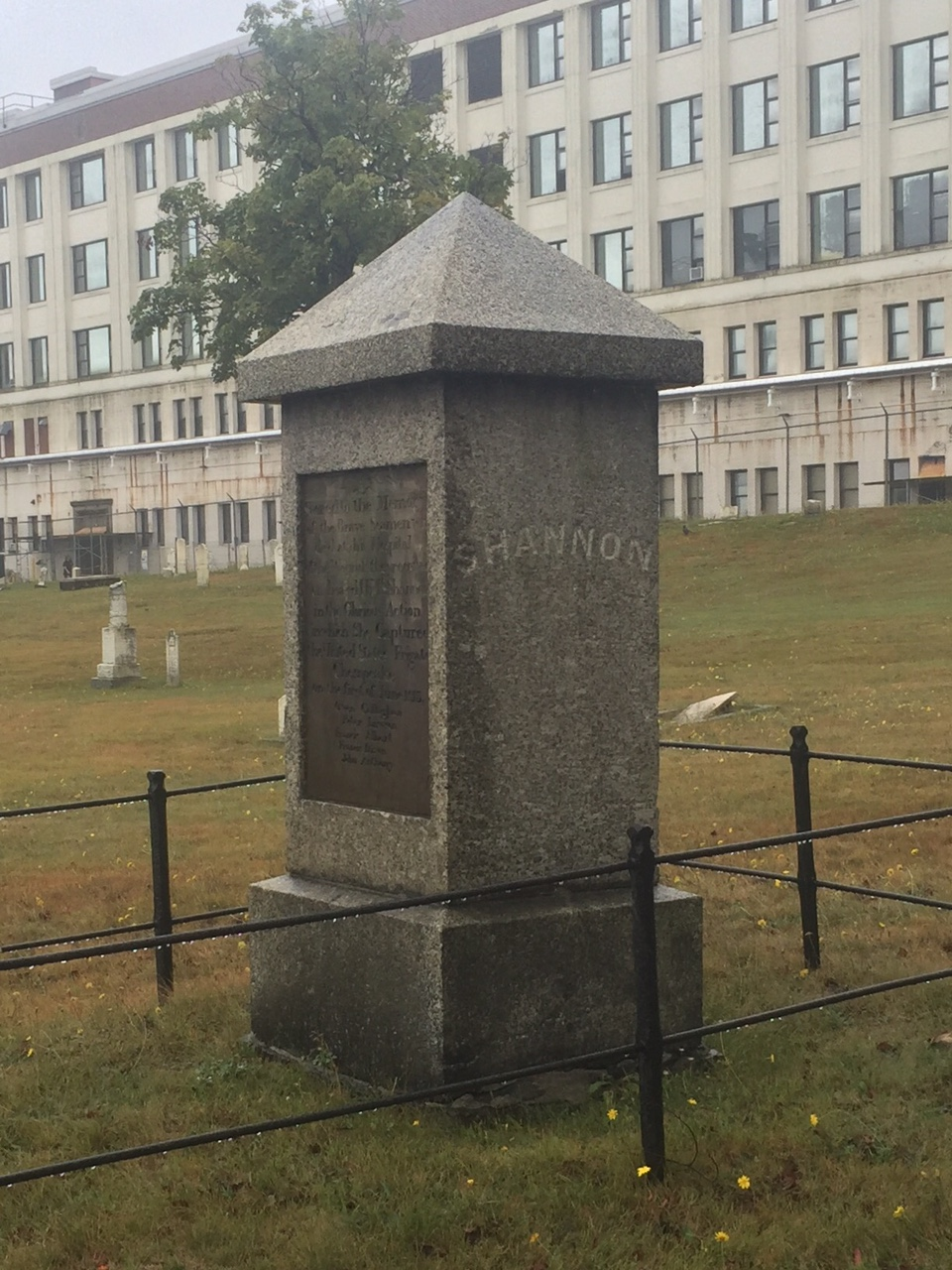
Monument to 7 of Dr. Rowlands patients from HMS Shannon, Royal Navy Burying Ground (Halifax, Nova Scotia) (1813)

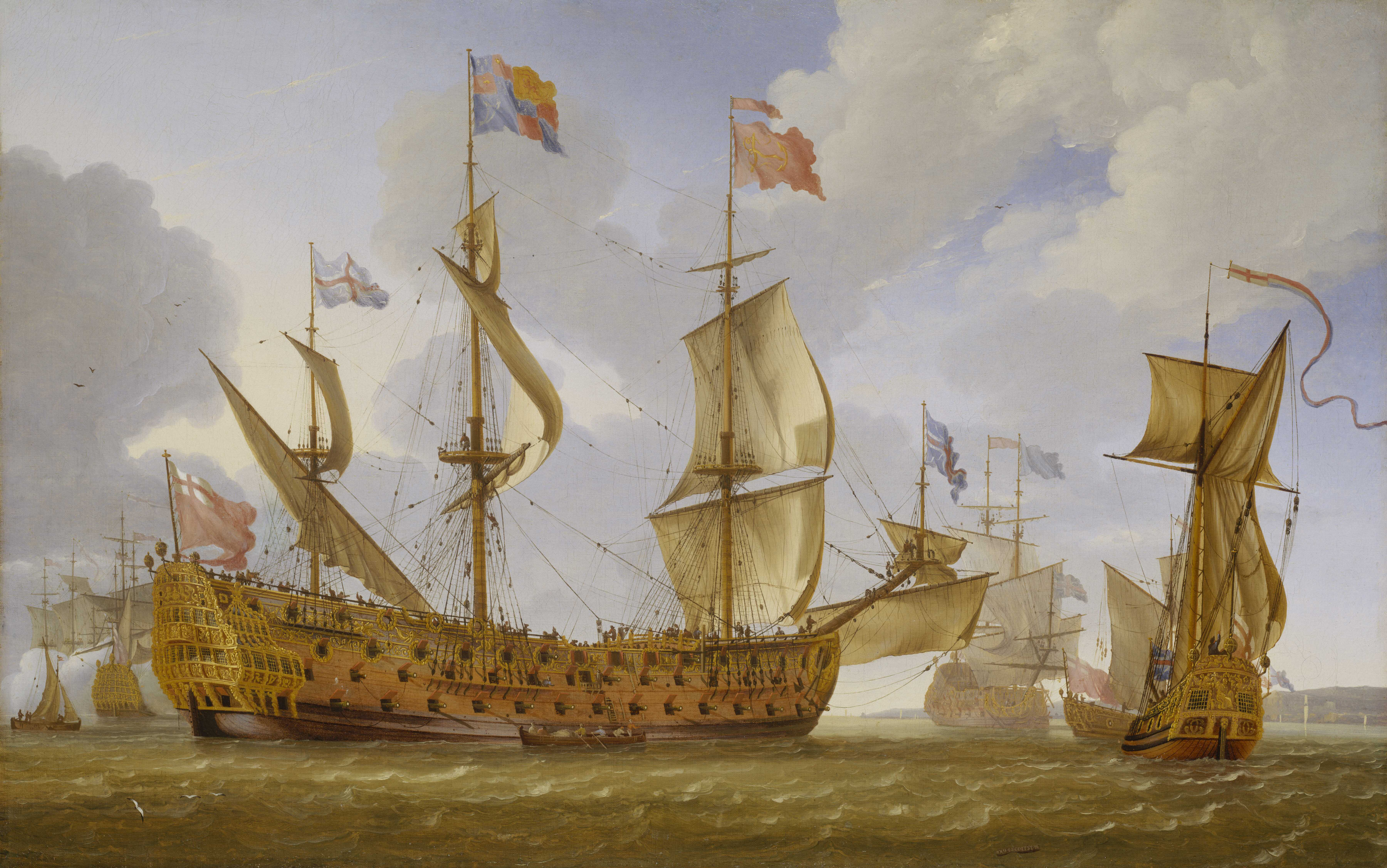
Dr. Rowland's ship Royal William

Rowlands' home, 57 Wimpole Street, London

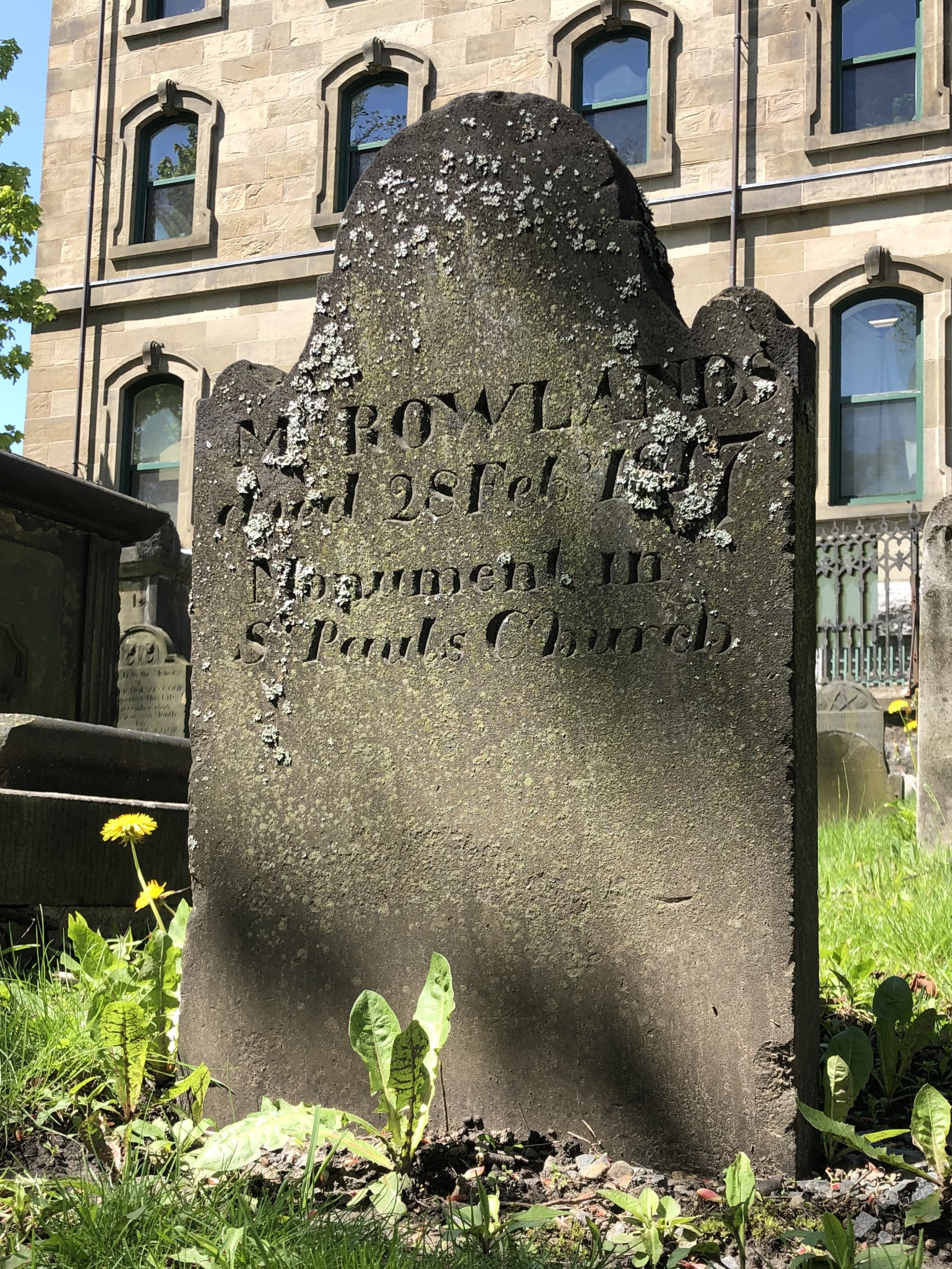
Esther Rowlands, Old Burying Ground (Halifax, Nova Scotia)
