= Cardigan Priory =

Benedictine priory in Cardigan, Wales (–1538)

Coordinates: 52.082724°N 4.655797°W

Cardigan Priory (formally: The Priory Church of Our Lady of Cardigan; alternative: Cardigan Cell) was a Benedictine priory located in Cardigan, Ceredigion, mid-west Wales.

Its church survives as a parish church, St. Mary's Church, Cardigan, whereas the priory itself was a separate building.

== History ==
Documents preserved at Gloucester Cathedral state that Chertsey Abbey misappropriated, and was later compelled to yield up, the Church of the Holy Trinity at Cardigan which had been granted to Gloucester by Gilbert de Clare previous to the establishment of the priory. The Brut y Tywysogion states that De Clare granted Cardigan Priory to the Gloucester Abbey prior to his death in or before 1117.

Around 1164, Rhys ap Gruffydd, Prince of South Wales, conquered Cardigan and brought it again under Welsh rule, and by a grant confirmed the gift of the then existing priory of Cardigan to the Benedictines of Chertsey Abbey in Surrey. During the Clares' time, it was dedicated to the Trinity; in Rhys's time, it was dedicated to St. Mary.

The priory was dissolved in 1538 after which time it was converted into a mansion and granted to Bisham, Berkshire, and subsequently to William and Mary Cavendish (1539/40). In the mid 17th century Cardigan Priory was the favoured home of Katherine Philips, known as "The Matchless Orinda". In 1922 it was re-opened by Dame Margaret Lloyd George as the Cardigan District and Memorial Hospital.

== Grounds ==
The priory was set on 200 acres which adjoined Cardigan Castle. The grounds and buildings extended along the River Teifi. The Bishops of St Davids lived in one of the buildings when they visited Cardigan, which may have coincided with problems noted by the abbot of Chertsey in 1433/4. In a 1599 map, the priory church is represented as cruciform in shape, while in Blaeu's map of 1646, the cruciform includes an adjoined chapel, probably the chantry chapel of Sir John ap Jevan.
