= St Mary's Church, Cardigan =

Church in Ceredigion, Wales

Coordinates: 52.0828°N 4.6561°W

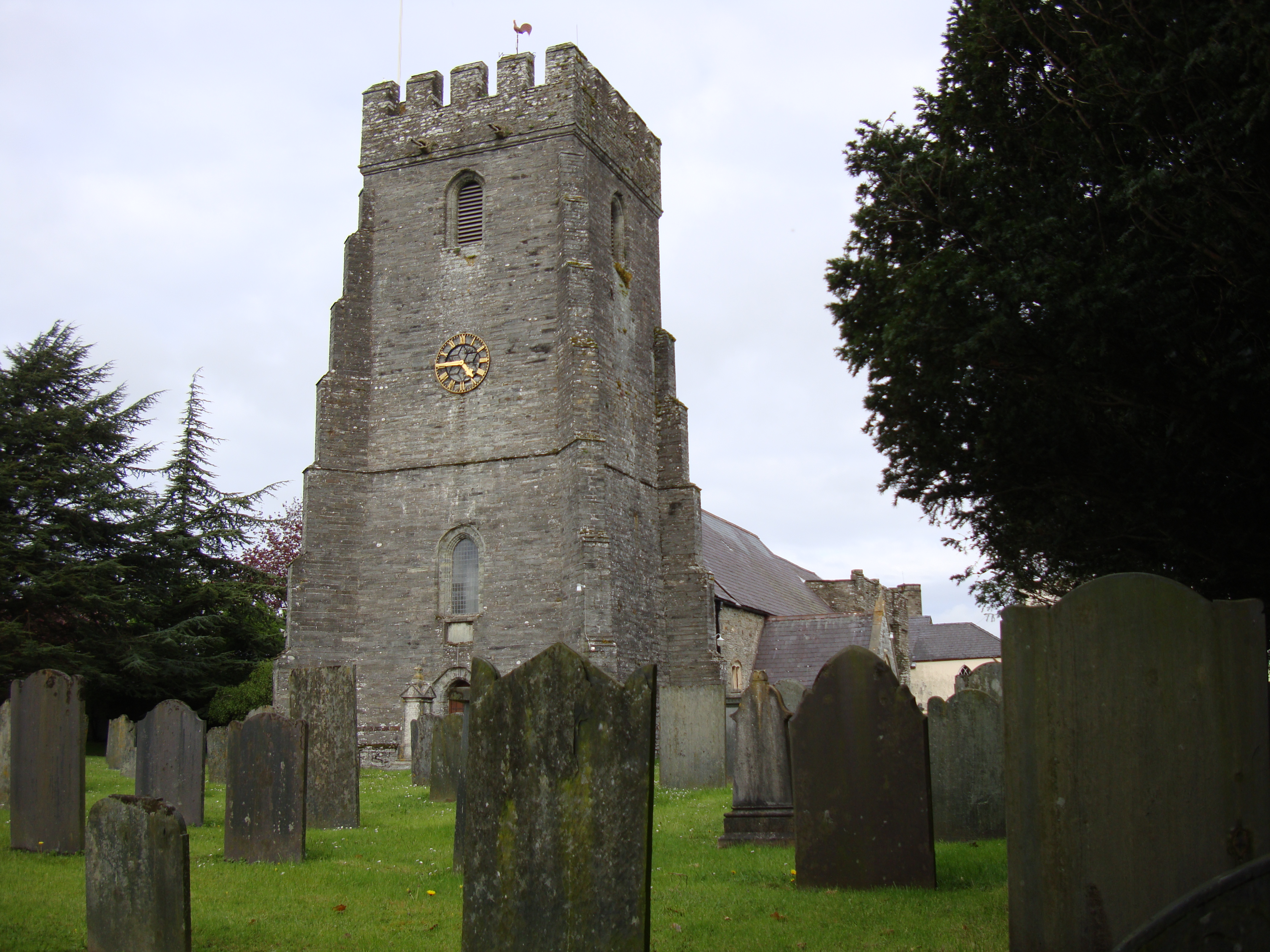
The Parish Church of St Mary

St Mary's Church is an Anglican church located in Cardigan, Ceredigion, Wales. In 1428, with the disappearance of Holy Trinity Church, St Mary's formally became the parish church of Cardigan, but it continued to serve as a priory church until the Reformation, being located close to Cardigan Priory. It is a Grade II* listed building.

== History ==
St. Mary's was both the priory church of the medieval Benedictine Cardigan Priory and a parish church. It continues as a parish church, part of the united benefice of Bro Teifi.

While the church was a 12th-century foundation, the present building dates from the fourteenth century, although substantially rebuilt. Its blocked south door "is thought to have been associated with the former priory buildings." In the thirteenth century St Mary's Priory church was the site of the shrine of Our Lady of the Taper, which was demolished at the Dissolution of the Monasteries.

The porch was rebuilt in 1639. In 1705, the tower collapsed; it was rebuilt over the next 40 years and was finally completed in 1748.

The stained glass window in the east wall of the chancel was installed in 1924, and depicts the Crucifixion with the Virgin Mary and St John. Surviving fragments of fifteenth century glass are set in the upper tracery lights.

== Notable burials ==
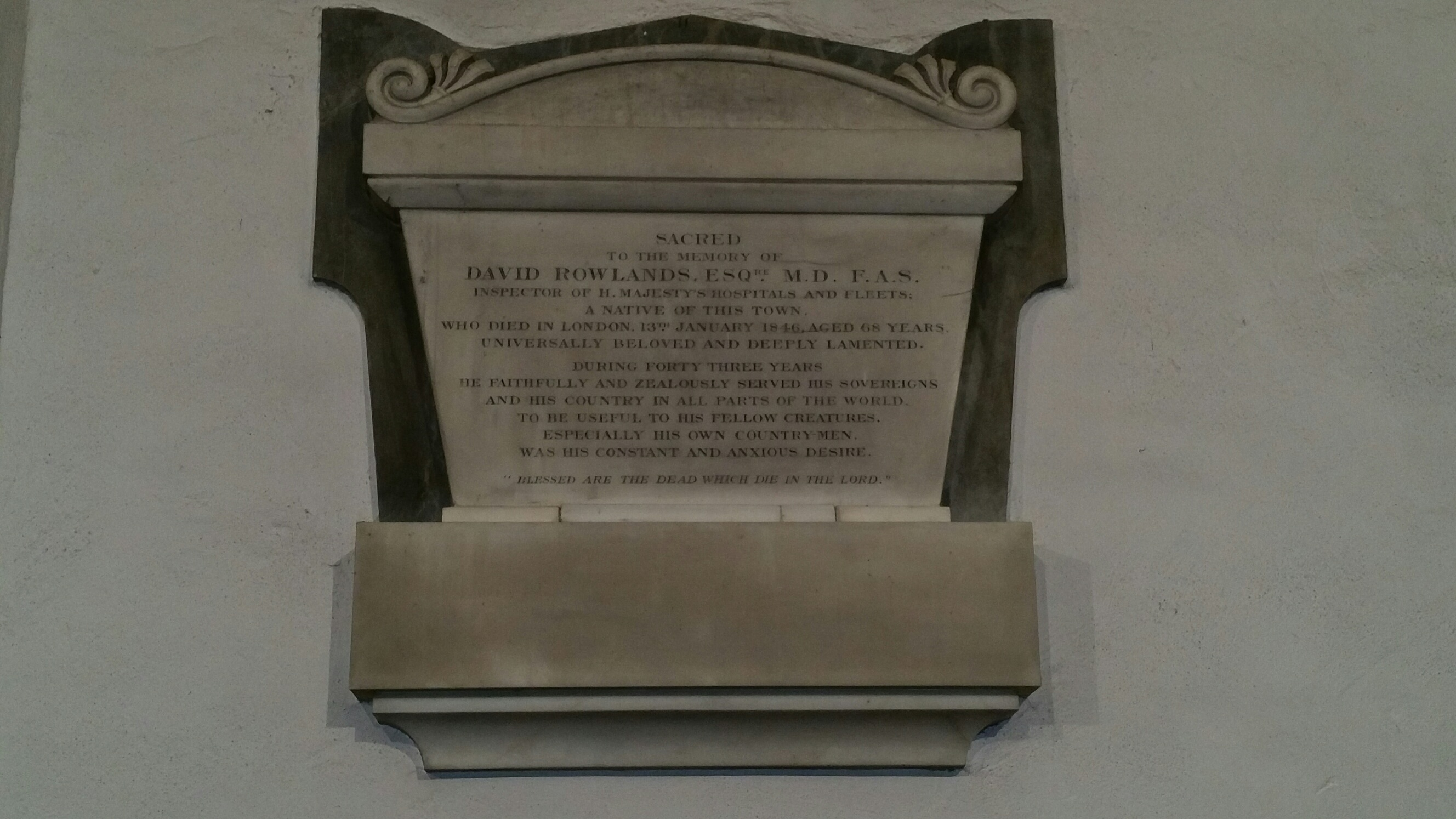
David Rowlands Monument

Dr David Rowlands, Inspector of H.M. Hospitals and Fleets, Royal Navy, died in 1846. He is commemorated by a memorial tablet inside the church.
