= The Ship, New Cavendish Street =

Pub in Fitzrovia, London

The Ship
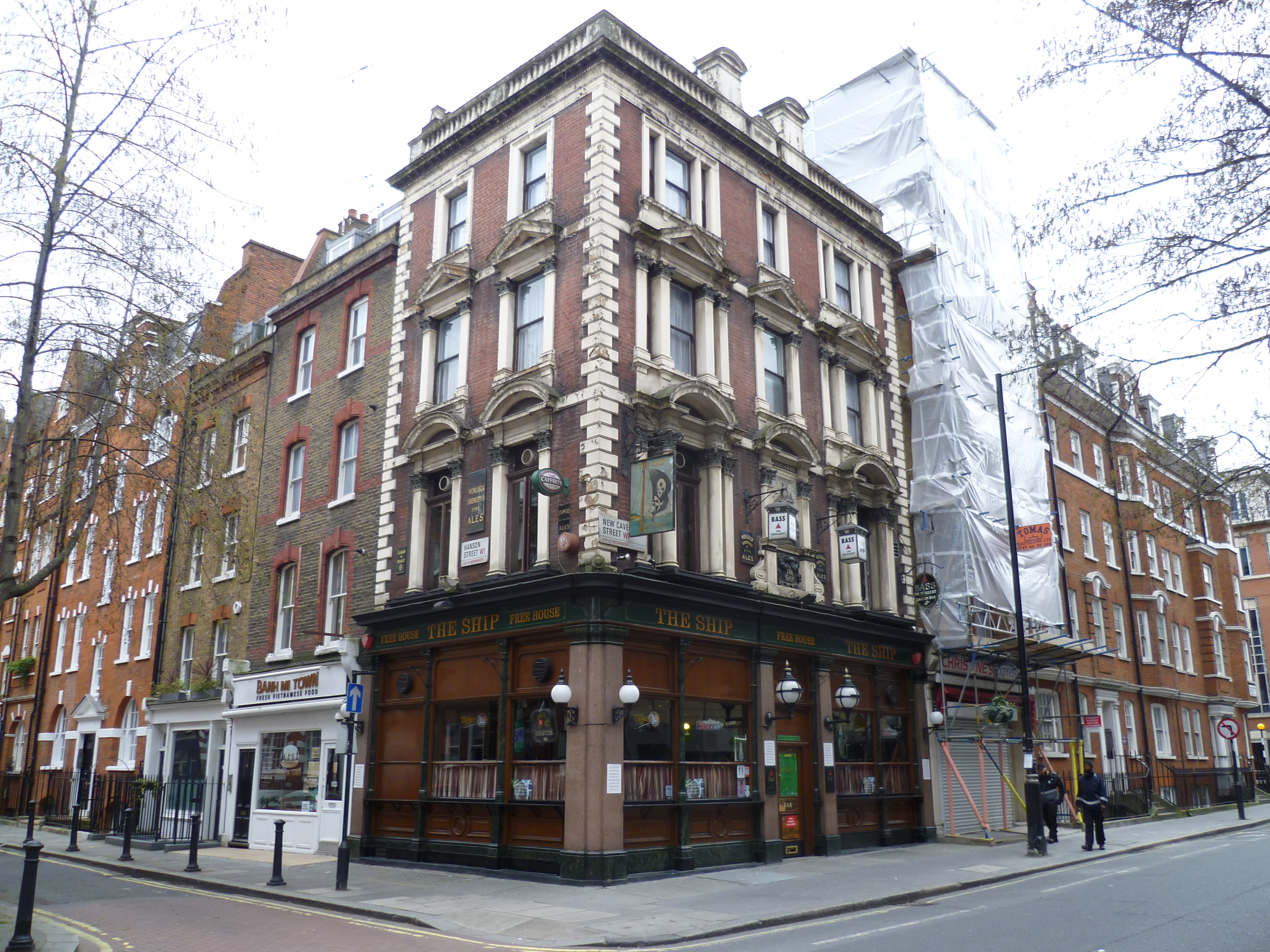
- The Ship
- Interactive map of The Ship
- Type: Public house
- Location: 31, HANSON STREET W1
- Coordinates: 51°31′13″N 0°8′27″W

Listed Building – Grade II
- Official name: THE SHIP PUBLIC HOUSE
- Designated: 05-Feb-1970
- Reference no.: 1224602

The Ship is a public house in New Cavendish Street, London. The 19th-century building is Grade II listed. It features as a regular meeting point for the experts in the BBC TV series Uncanny.
