= St Llwchaiarn's Church, Llanllwchaiarn =

Coordinates: 52.5232°N 3.2916°W

St Llwchaiarn’s church, Llanllwchaiarn
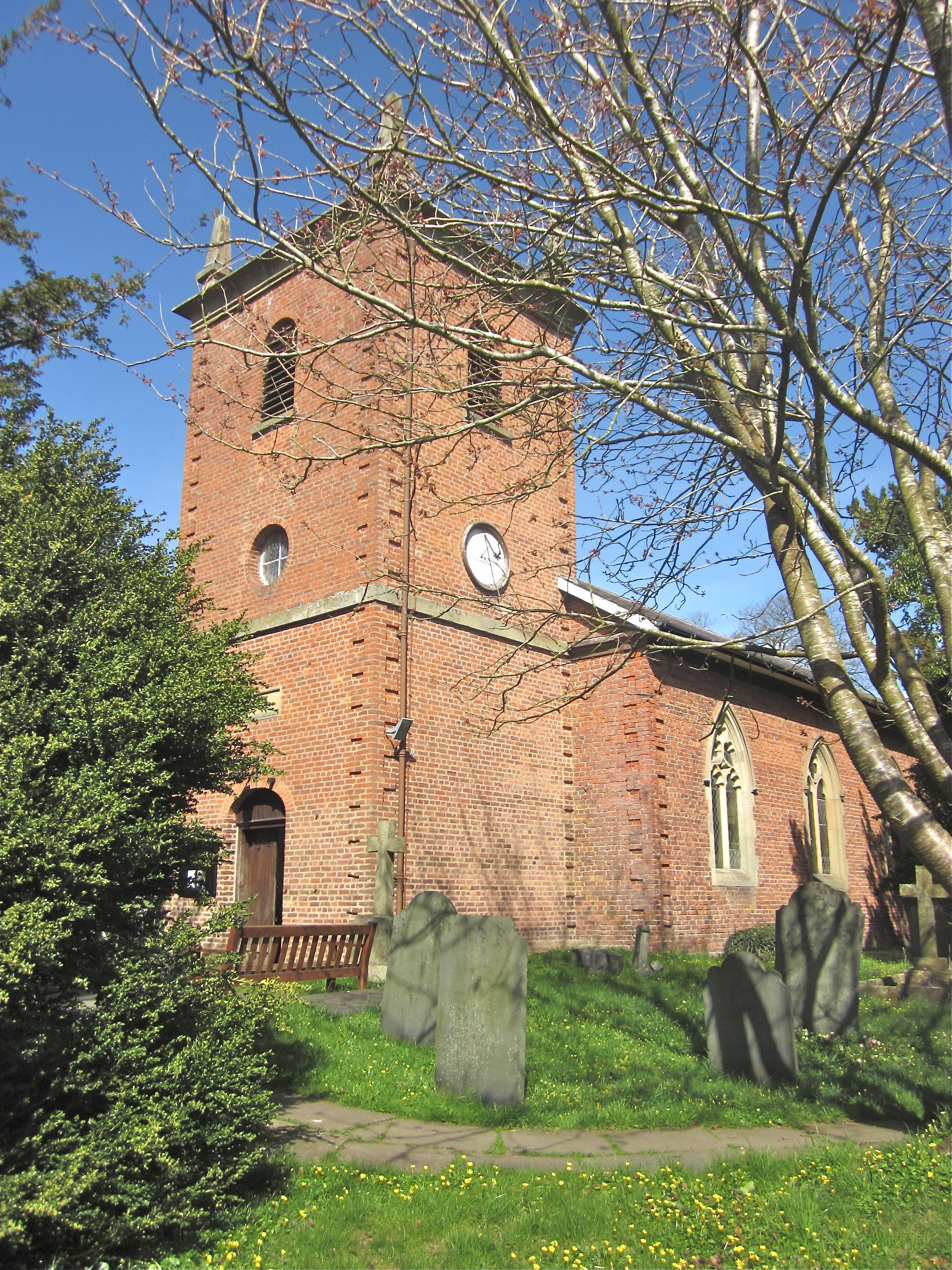
- Llanllwchaiarn. Church from SE

- Location within Powys
- Location: Newtown with Llanllwchaiarn, Powys
- Country: Wales
- Denomination: Church in Wales

History
- Founder: St Llwchaiarn
- Dedication: St Llwchaiarn
- Consecrated: Probably 7th century AD
- Events: Rebuilt 1816

Architecture
- Functional status: Active
- Heritage designation: Grade II
- Designated: 18 July 1949
- Architectural type: Church
- Style: Georgian with Victorian interior
- Construction cost: £1200

Administration
- Diocese: St Asaph
- Archdeaconry: Montgomery
- Parish: Llanllwchaiarn

St Llwchaiarn's church, Llanllwchaiarn was the parish church of Llanllwchaiarn, now within the community of Newtown with Llanllwchaiarn and lies within the historic county of Montgomeryshire in Powys. The church occupies a position on rising ground overlooking the river Severn and is to the north east of Newtown. The present church was rebuilt in 1816. In 2011 the medieval carved screen, originally from St Mary's church in Newtown, was re-positioned in Llanllwchaiarn church

== Saint Llwchaiarn ==
The Church is dedicated to the 6th-century Saint Llwchaiarn or Lluwchaiarn, who was also the patron saint of the adjacent parish of Llanmerewig and of two parishes in Ceredigion. The 16th-century local Welsh poet, Siôn Ceri describes the various feats and miracles attributed to the saint which include slaying a dragon and causing a hind to leap into a pool of water, but there is very little certain evidence about the life of the saint.

== Earlier history and setting of the Church ==
In recent times the churchyard has been extended, but the original churchyard, is a raised area that is almost circular, and contains many historic yew trees. The combination of a church within an almost circular churchyard and an early dedication would suggest that it was founded in the 6th or 7th centuries. The church is recorded in the Norwich Taxation of 1254 as 'Ecc'a de Llanlocharen' with a value of £1 6s 8d. In 1263 part of it was appropriated to the Cistercian nunnery at Llanllugan, and in 1291 the combined value was £4 6s 8d.

=== John Ingleby's Views of the Church, 1796 ===
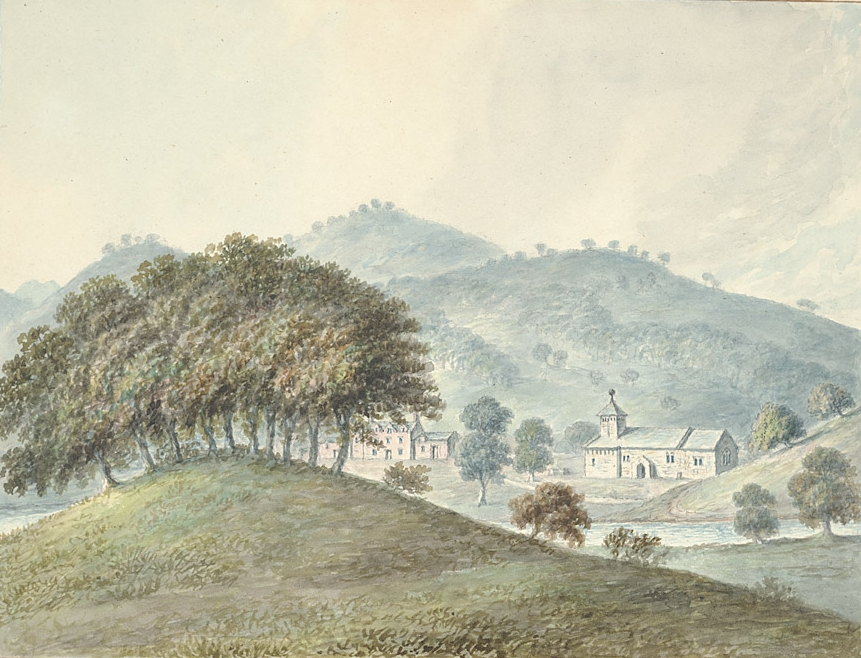
Llanllwchaiarn Church by John Ingleby 1796

In the 1790s Thomas Pennant commissioned John Ingleby to produce a series of watercolours for a revised version of his Tour in Wales. The watercolours are now in the collections of the National Library of Wales.

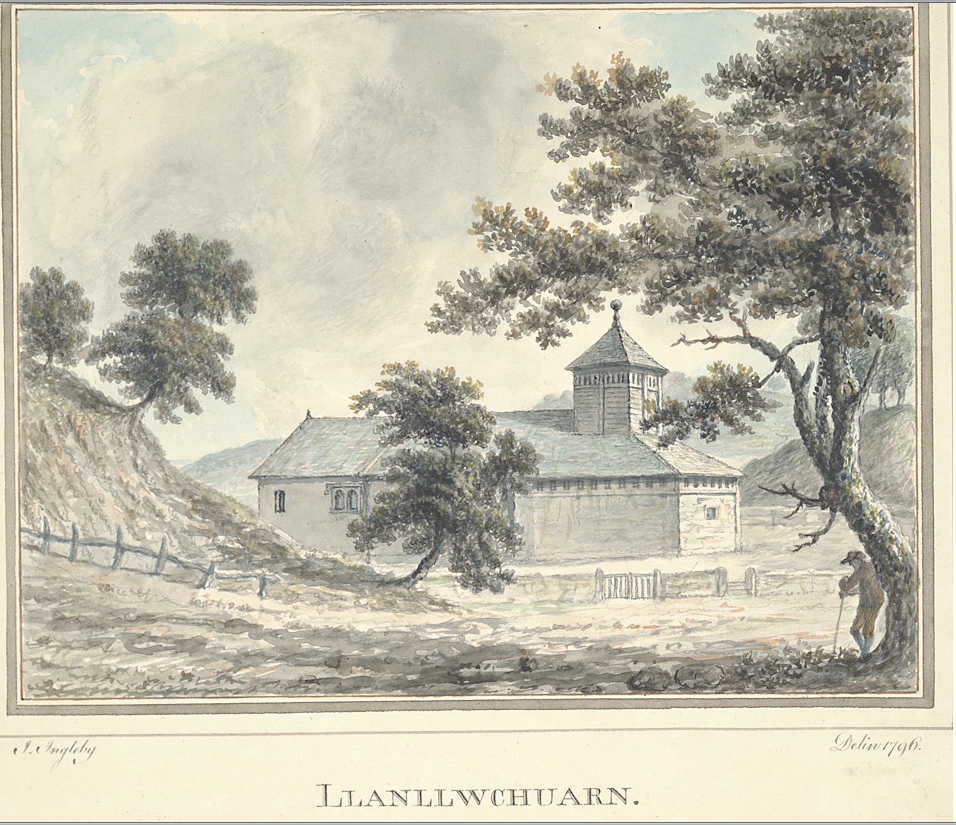
Llanllwchaiarn Church

In 1795 Pennant commissioned two watercolors from John Ingelby of Llanllwchaiarn Church. These two illustrations of the parish church, before it was re-built in 1815 appear to be the only ones in existence. The old church was an example of a church with an internally supported bell tower. The first view shows the church from the south and looking across the river Severn and the second shows the church from the North.

=== Re-building of the Church ===
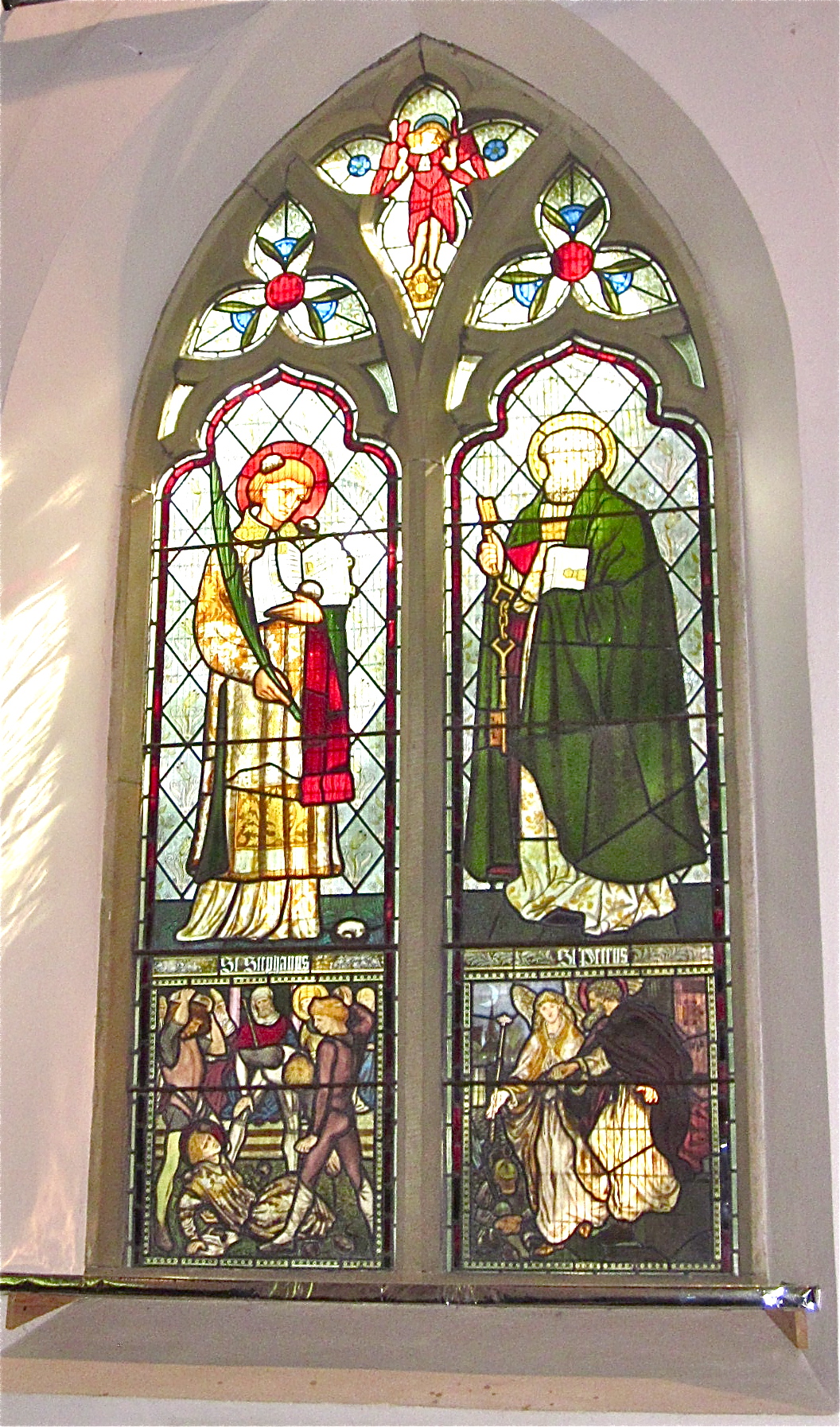
St Llwchaiarn's church, Llanllwchaiarn. Window by Morris & Co.

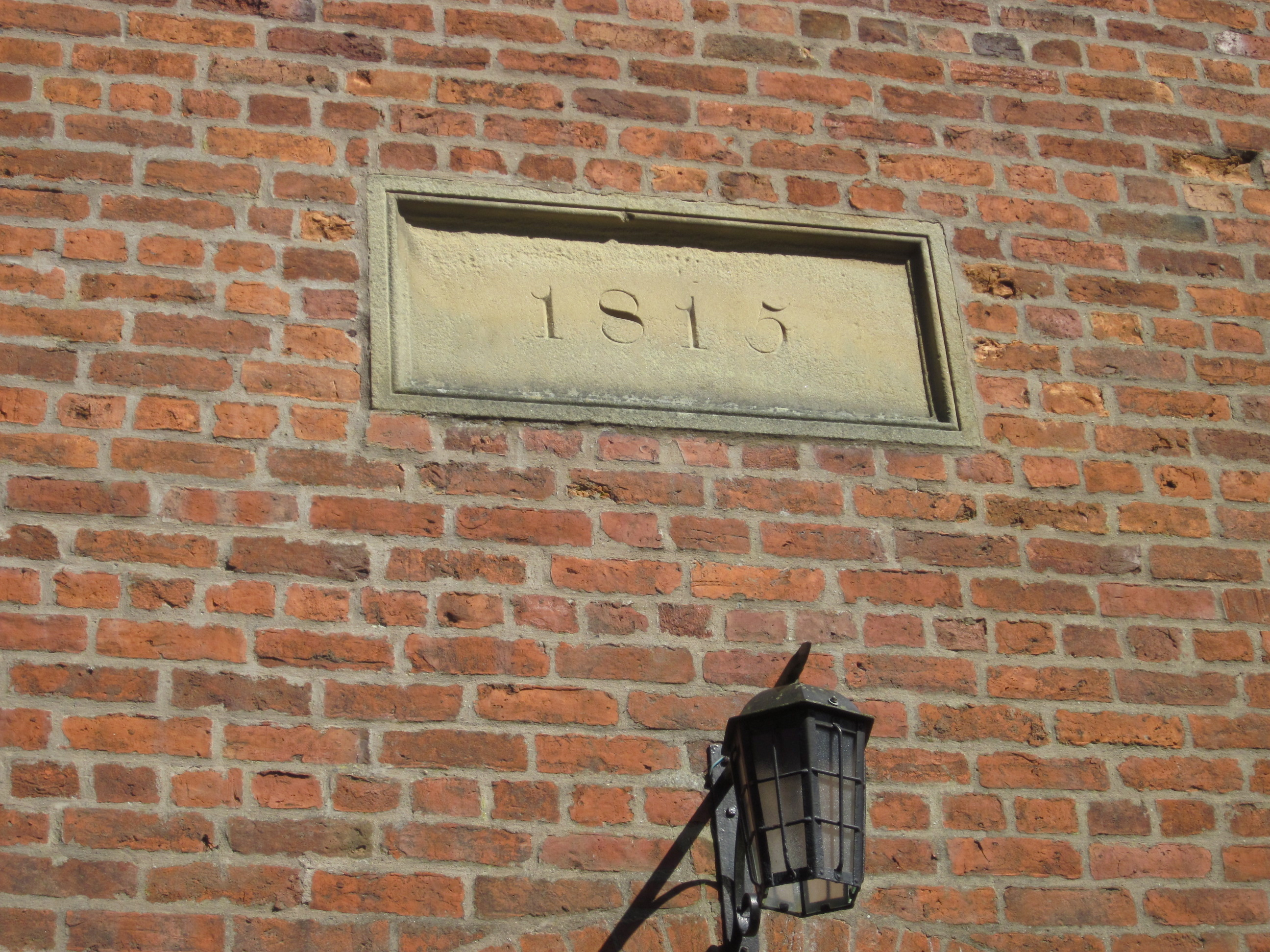
St Llwchaiarn's church, Llanllwchaiarn, Datestone 1815.

The present church was built on the old site in 1815 at a cost of £1,200. The re-built church was a simple Georgian brick church with a square tower was built and in 1864 a chancel and vestry were added1. Recently, the fine carved Medieval rood screen from the old church at Newtown, that had been moved to St David's Church, was moved again to Llanllwchaiarn.

Further restoration work, which included the eastern extension of the chancel and vestry and the insertion of the bench seating, was completed by R.J.Withers in 1865 at a cost of £460. The original east wall of the church was cut through and the plain yellow sandstone chancel arch erected; the stonework was designed and executed by Edward Jones of Newtown. The round headed windows were also altered to the Gothic style and stained glass windows have been inserted, including one by Morris & Co.

=== Screen from St Mary's Church, Newtown. ===
In 2011 the medieval carved screen of c.1500, originally from St Mary's church in Newtown, was re-positioned in Llanllwchaiarn church. Fenton thought the screen was perhaps the most perfect thing of the kind in the kingdom and the Rev John Parker described it in 1829 as a world of Gothic art…..with the highest luxuries of workmanship and colouring. The largest part of the screen to survive is a length with five bays to either side of the Tudor arched door, its spandrels with cusped circles. Double ogee tracery heads make an inventive display of circles, quatrefoils and wheels. The bressumer has intricate trails of running ornament, incorporating leaf designs, together with flower, vine, pomegranate and seaweed.the carving is still coloured in gold, red and green. A section of coving is also preserved, with its elaborate panels and drop scrolling.

=== War graves ===
The churchyard contains the Commonwealth war graves of two Royal Welsh Fusiliers soldiers of World War I and an ATS Warrant Officer of World War II.

== Clergy ==
This list is incomplete.

Vicars

- 1537 Owen Jones
- 1556 Thomas ap Ienn
- 1560 Thomas Jenkins
- 1570 Thomas Madoc
- 1570 Hugh Price
- 1589 William Evan
- 1590 Ellis Evans
- 1621 Arthur Williams
- 1624 Evan Thomas
- 1645 Evan Evans
- 1661 Hugh Price
- 1688 Richard Morgan
- 1727 John Lloyd B.D.
- 1743 Thomas Morgan M.A.
- 1756 Edmund Baxter
- 1762 Edmund Blaney
- 1775 Samuel Drake
- 1799 Rowland Wingfield M.A.
- 1801 Charles Wingfield
- 1851 Frederick Henry Tompson M.A.

== Gallery ==
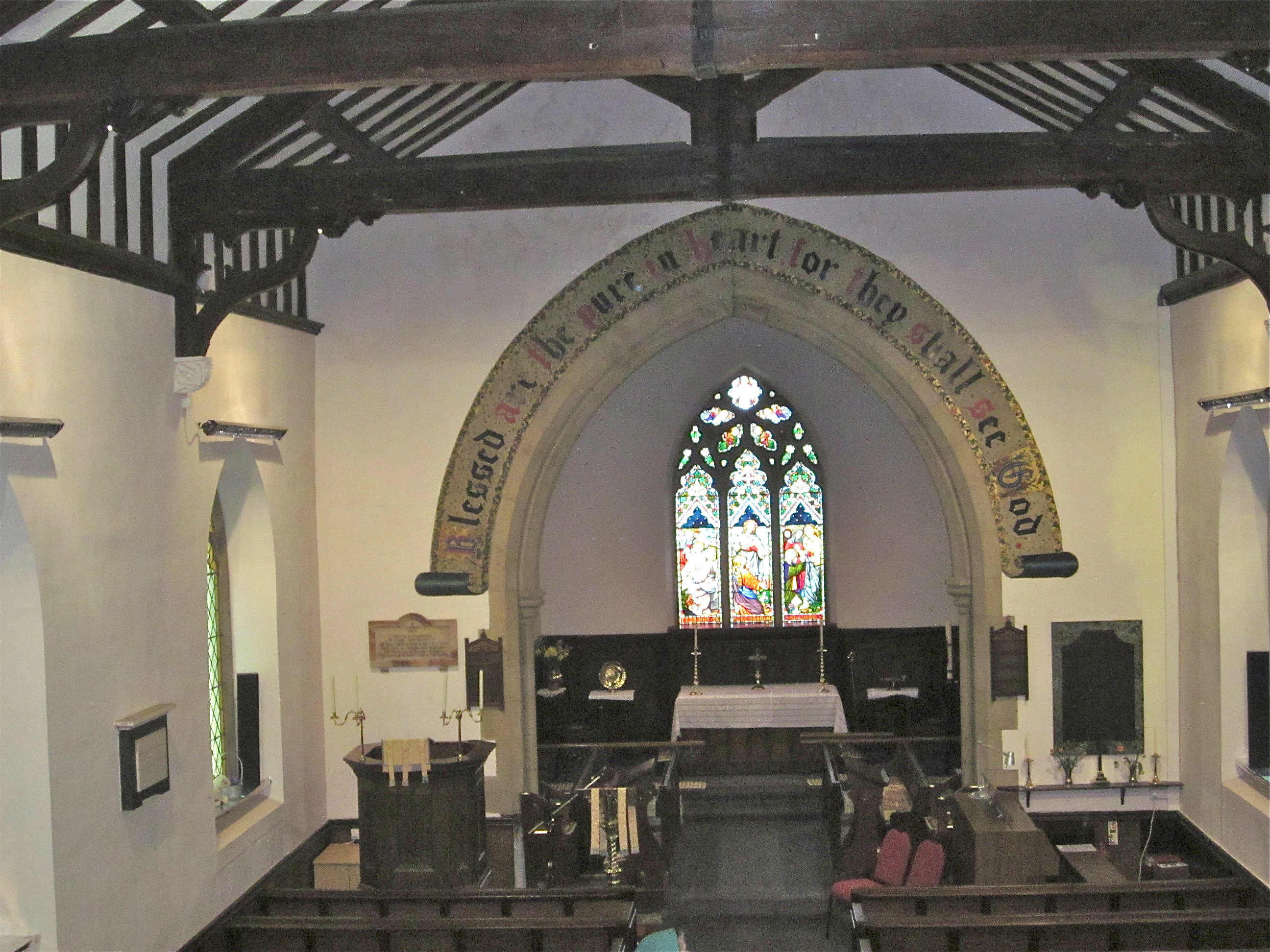
St Llwchaiarn's church, Llanllwchaiarn. Looking towards chancel

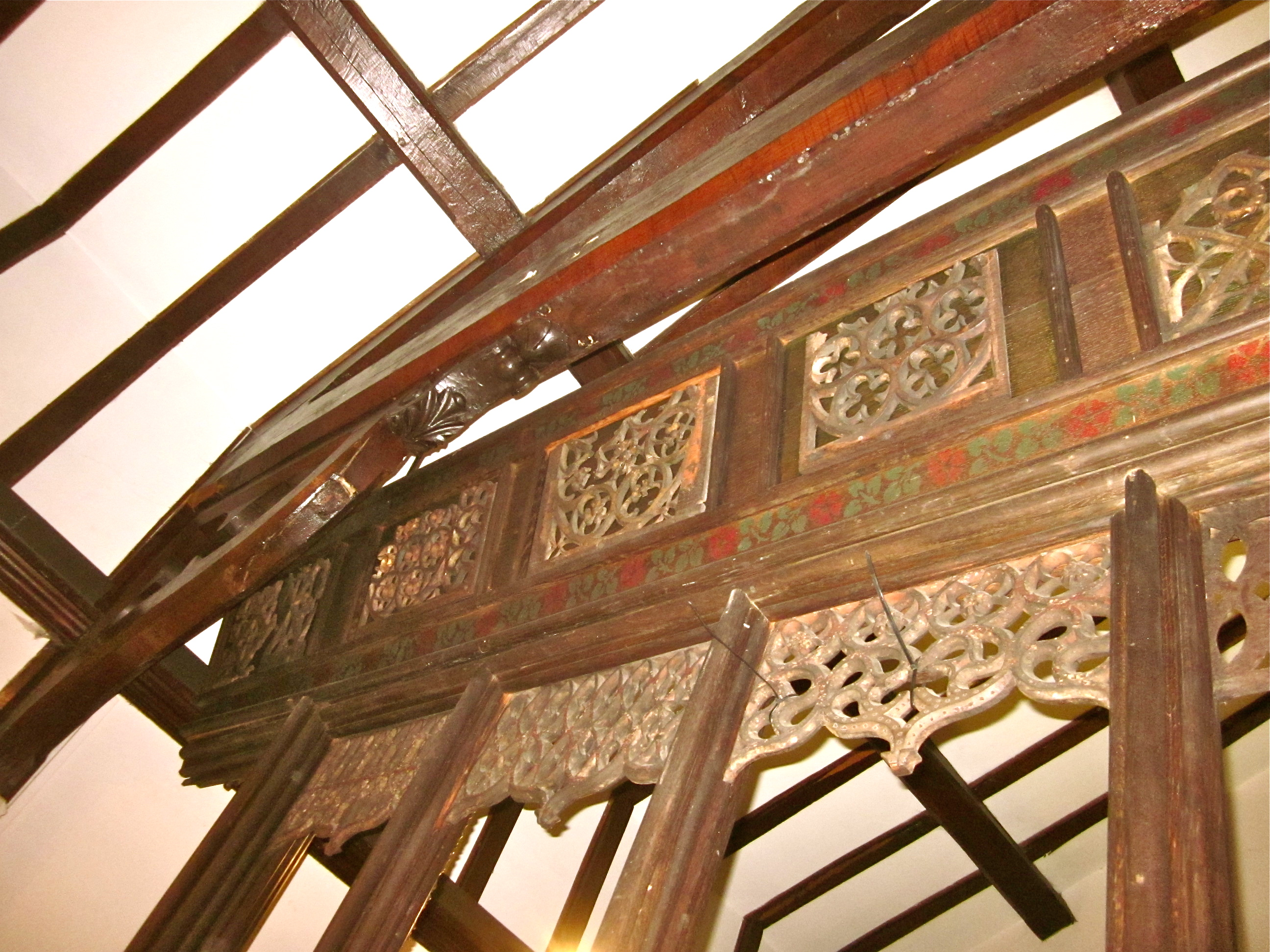
St Llwchaiarn's church, Llanllwchaiarn. Rood screen.

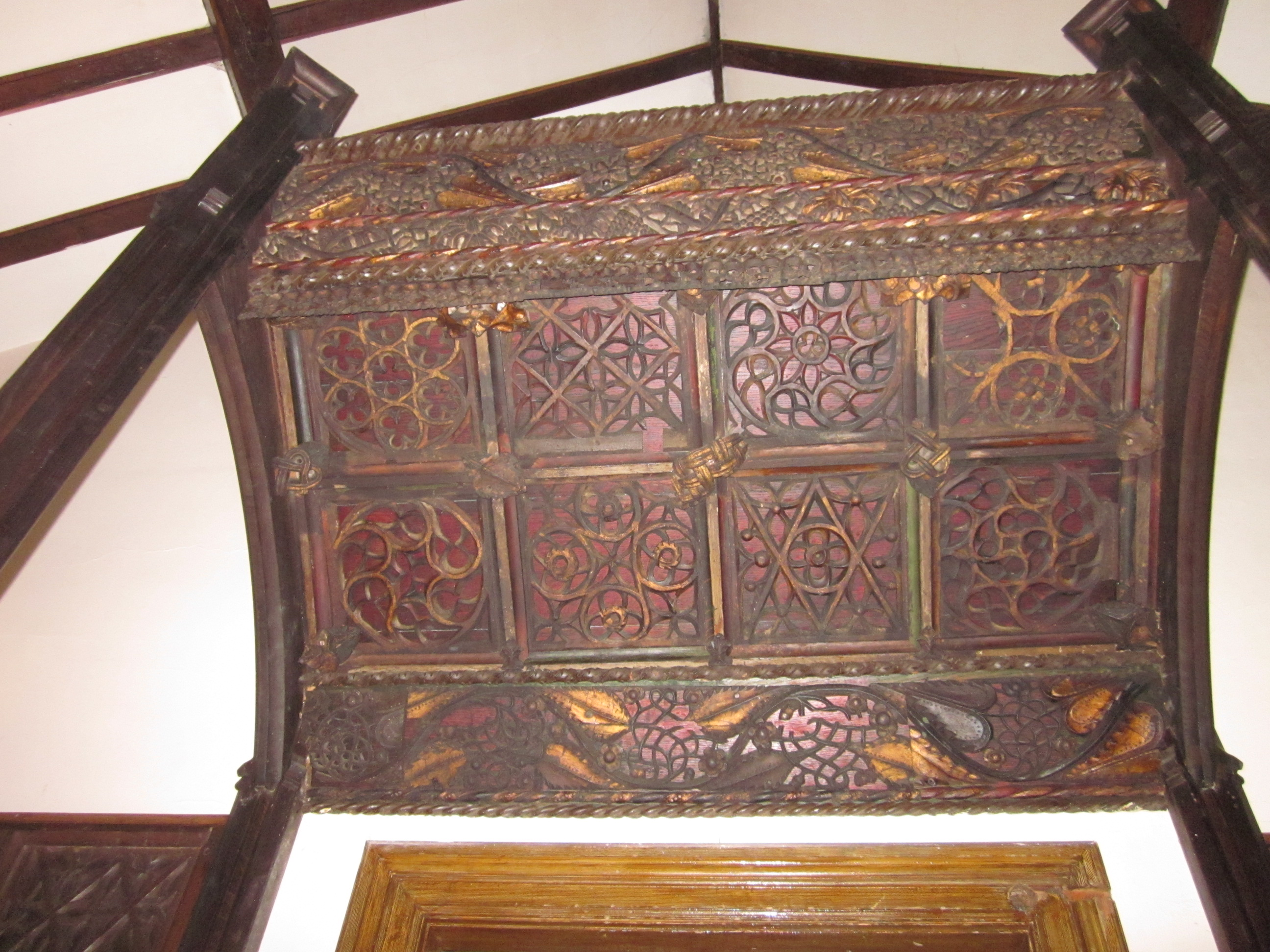
St Llwchaiarn's church, Llanllwchaiarn. 'Dado' from Rood Screen.

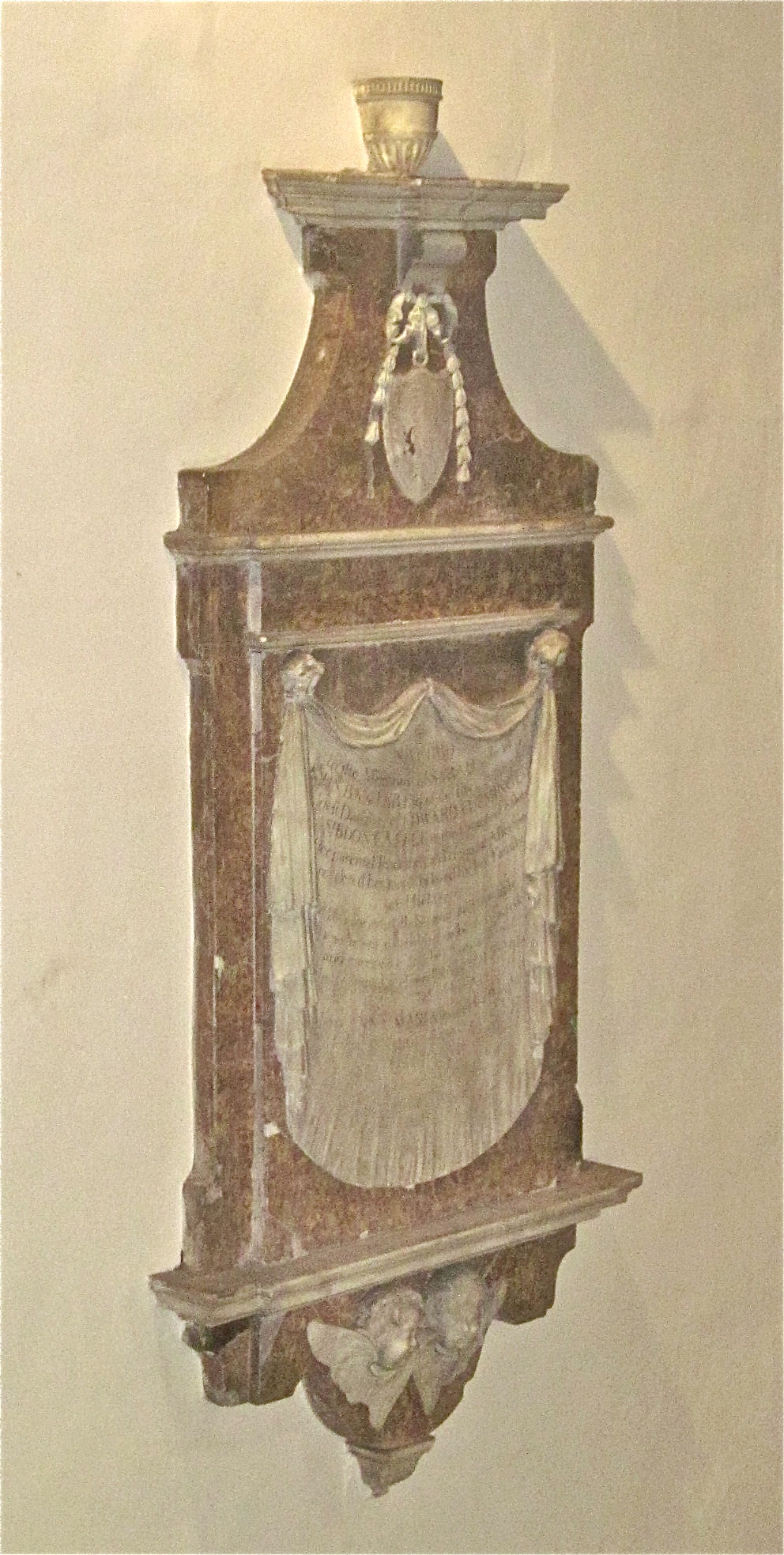
St Llwchaiarn's church, Llanllwchaiarn. Monument to Sarah Baxter who died in 1774.

== Literature ==
- Bartrum P. C. (1993), A Welsh Classical Dictionary: People in History and Legend up to about A.D. 1000, National Library of Wales.
- Oliver H. N, (2000), Llanllwchaiarn: Church and Parish, Newtown.
- Scourfield R. and Haslam R. (2013), The Buildings of Wales: Powys; Montgomeryshire, Radnorshire and Breconshire, Yale University Press.
- Thomas, D.R.( 1908) History of the Diocese of Saint Asaph, Vol 1, 128–135.
- Thomas D.R. (Archdeacon) (1903), Montgomeryshire Screens and Rood-Lofts, Archaeologia Cambrensis, 6th series, 85–120.
- Walker D. Some Account of Rood Screens and Timber Work of ‘Powys Land’ Part 1: Rood Screen in Newtown, Removed from the Old Parish Church. Part 2, Llanwnog Church. Part 3. Rood Screen, Llananno Church, Radnor. Montgomeryshire Collections Vol. 3 (1870), 211–214; Vol. 4 (1874), 181–184. Vol. 7, 61–64.
- Wheeler, R. (2006), Medieval Church Screens Of The Southern Marches, Logaston Press.
