= New Cavendish Street =

Street in the City of Westminster, London

Coordinates: 51.51965°N 0.14542°W

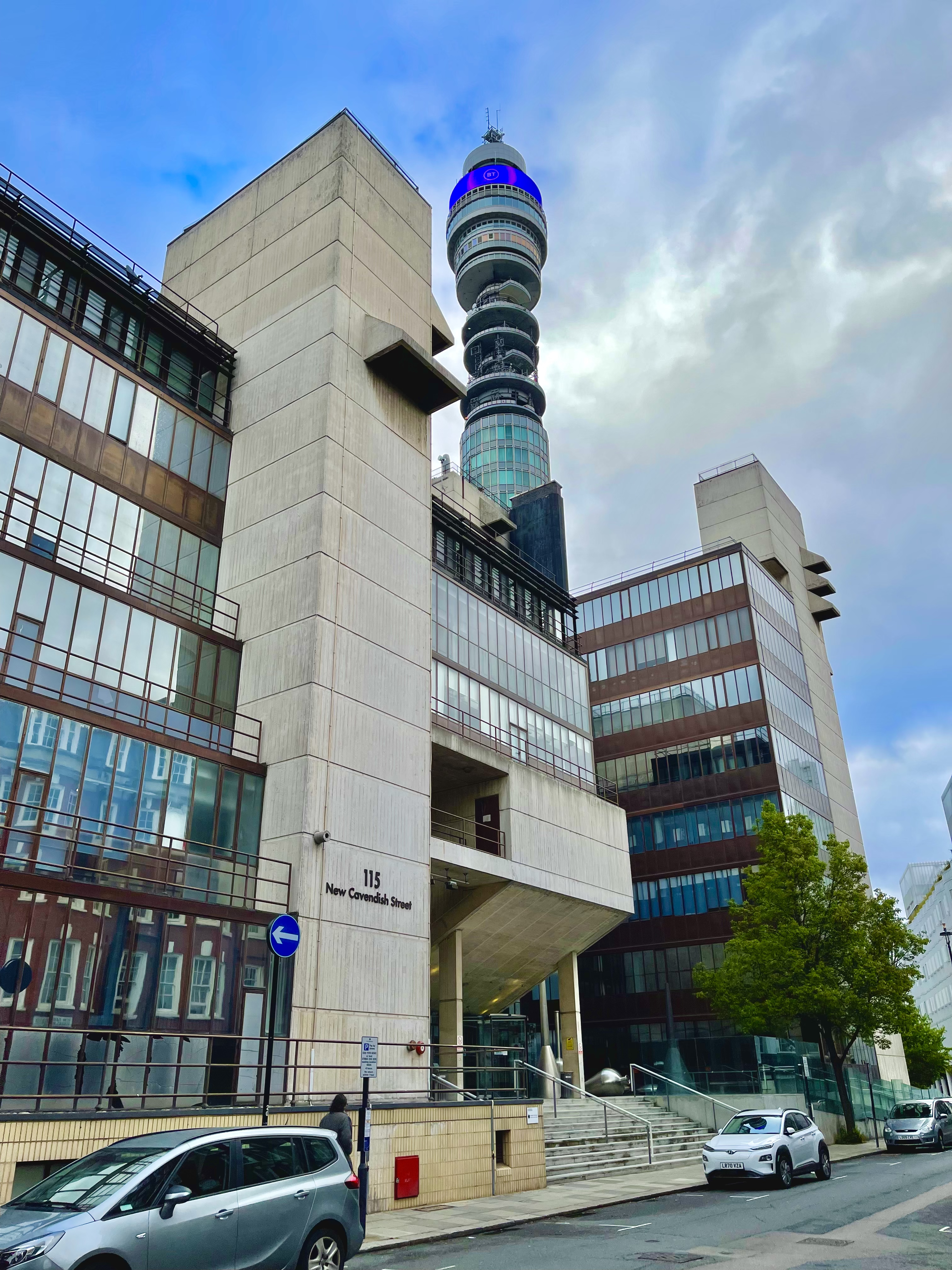
- University of Westminster's Cavendish campus

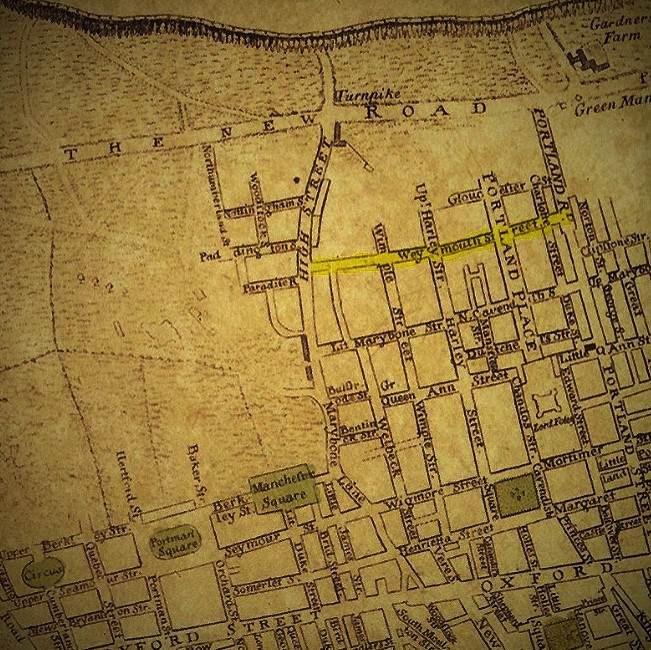
- Map clipping of Marylebone showing New Cavendish Street, c. 1770
- Part of: Marylebone and West End wards
- Namesake: Cavendish family
- Area: City of Westminster
- Location: Fitzrovia
- Postal code: W1W
- East: Cleveland Street
- West: Marylebone High Street

New Cavendish Street is a street in the City of Westminster, that runs from Marylebone High Street in the west to Cleveland Street in the east. The street was built in 1775 and named after the Cavendish family, who were related to the ground landlords, the Dukes of Portland.

== Buildings ==
Among the notable buildings in the street are:

- 61 New Cavendish Street, the former home of Alfred Waterhouse, designer of the Natural History Museum.
- The Cavendish Campus of the University of Westminster.
- The Ship, a Grade II listed public house.
- 63 New Cavendish Street, London is a Grade II* listed building, originally planned by Robert and James Adam on the Duke of Portland's Marylebone Estate in the 1770s. By 1775, however, the Adams’ attention had turned to the creation of Portland Place, and neo-classical architect John Johnson took over the site, erecting the townhouse that has since been redeveloped as Asia House. The rooms retain many of their original features – including bookcases designed by Sir John Soane and plaster cornicing – while other parts of the building have been modernised to create café and gallery spaces.

== Recent developments ==
Among the recent developments on the street are:

- Trees being planted along New Cavendish Street in 2011.
- Rain garden installed at New Cavendish St and Marylebone High Street intersection in 2019.

== Gallery ==
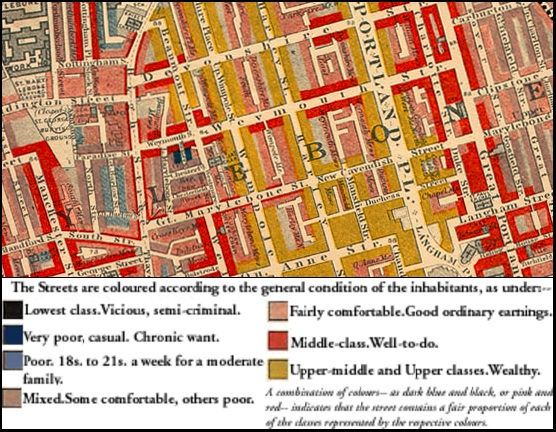
Extract from Charles Booth's 1889 survey of the lives and occupations of area residents
