= Bill Coleman (cricketer) =

English cricketer

Personal information
- Full name: William Ezra Coleman
- Born: 5 December 1878; Hitchin, Hertfordshire, England
- Died: 27 January 1960 (aged 81); Napsbury, Hertfordshire, England
- Batting: Right-handed
- Bowling: Right-arm fast-medium

Domestic team information
- Years: Team
- 1896–1914: Hertfordshire
- 1902–1909: Marylebone Cricket Club

Career statistics
Competition	First-class
Matches	10
Runs scored	180
Batting average	11.25
100s/50s	–/–
Top score	37
Balls bowled	1,008
Wickets	23
Bowling average	21.00
5 wickets in innings	1
10 wickets in match	–
Best bowling	6/30
Catches/stumpings	4/–
- Source: Cricinfo, 5 July 2019

William Ezra Coleman (5 December 1878 – 27 January 1960) was an English first-class cricketer.

Coleman was born at Hitchin in December 1878. He made his debut in minor counties cricket for Hertfordshire against Norfolk in the 1896 Minor Counties Championship. Six years later he made his debut in first-class cricket for the Marylebone Cricket Club (MCC) against London County at Lord's. Coleman played first-class cricket for the MCC until 1909, making a total of ten appearances. Across his ten matches, he scored 180 runs at an average of 11.25, with a high score of 37. With his right-arm fast-medium bowling, he took 23 wickets at a bowling average of 21.00, with best figures of 6 for 30. These figures, which was his only five wicket haul in first-class cricket, came against Oxford University in 1903. He continued to play minor counties cricket for Hertfordshire until 1914, making a total of 147 appearances in the Minor Counties Championship. He scored a total of 3,885 runs for Hertfordshire in the Minor Counties Championship, as well as taking 619 wickets. He is Hertfordshire's fourth leading wicket-taker in the Minor Counties Championship.

Outside of playing, he spent ten years on the groundstaff at Lord's, in addition to coaching cricket at St George's School, Harpenden and spending 23 years coaching at Aldenham School. He died in January 1960 at Napsbury, Hertfordshire.
