= Chingford United Reformed Church =

Coordinates: 51.633123°N 0.005029°E

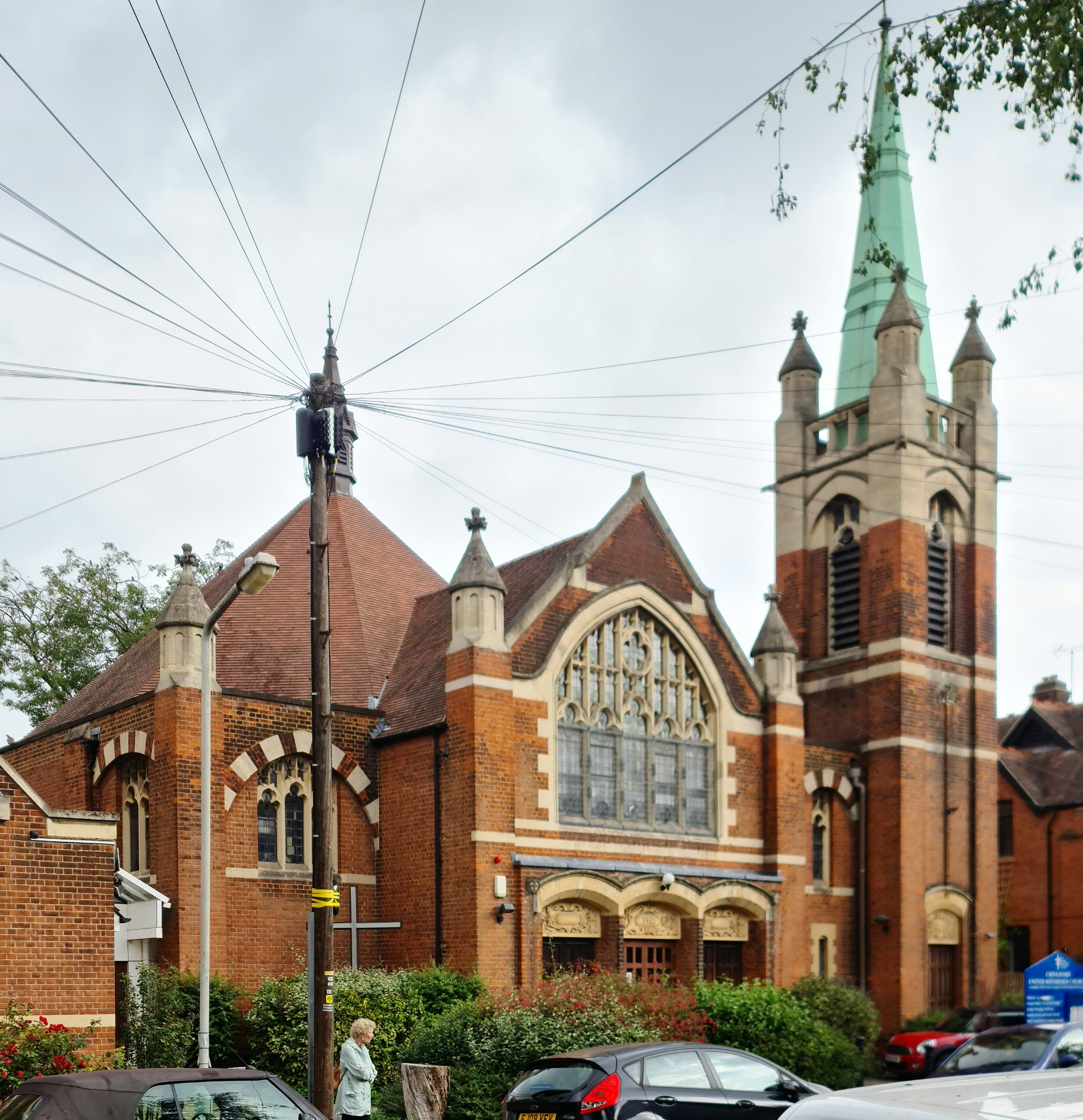
- Chingford United Reformed Church, west front in Buxton Road
- Chingford United Reformed Church
- OS grid reference: TQ 38863 94602
- Location: Buxton Road, Chingford, London, E4 7DP
- Country: England
- Denomination: United Reformed Church
- Website: https://www.forestgroupurc.co.uk/chingford-urc.html

History
- Status: Active
- Founded: 1888

Architecture
- Heritage designation: Grade II listed
- Designated: 2 July 1998
- Architect(s): John Diggle Mould and Samuel Joseph Mould
- Style: Perpendicular Gothic
- Years built: 1910

Administration
- Division: Forest Group of United Reformed Churches

Chingford United Reformed Church is a Grade II listed United Reformed Church at Buxton Road, Chingford, in the London Borough of Waltham Forest.

== History ==
The original Congregational church in Chingford was founded in 1888, initially meeting at a café in Station Road called the Victoria Coffee Palace. A plot of land was bought by the church in 1889 and a temporary corrugated iron building, or "tin tabernacle" was erected on the site. In 1890, a church hall was opened, named Spicer Hall after James Spicer, a benefactor. The architect of the hall was Rowland Plumbe; it was eventually sold by the church and converted into apartments in 2004. In 1910, the new church was constructed; the architects were John Diggle Mould and his younger brother Samuel Joseph Mould, who were Primitive Methodists from Manchester that specialised in Nonconformist church buildings.

== Description ==
Of red brick with stone banding, the west frontage facing Buxton Road has a triple entrance under a large Perpendicular Gothic window, leaded in the Art Nouveau style. A tower with pinnacles and a copper clad spire stands on the right of the front. Internally, a foyer below a gallery gives entry to a square nave, made octagonal by stone arches in the corners. A stone screen under a large arch divide the nave from a polygonal sanctuary.
