= Napsbury Park =

Residential development in Hertfordshire, England

Coordinates: 51.723°N 0.310°W

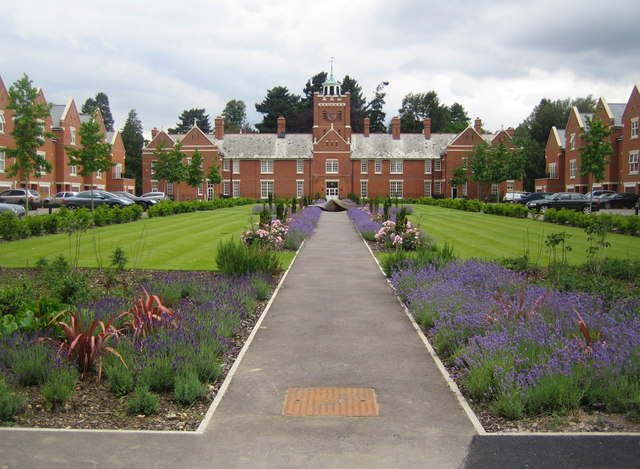
- Napsbury Park

- Location within Hertfordshire
- OS grid reference: TL 16811 04070
- District: St Albans
- Shire county: Hertfordshire
- Region: East
- Country: England
- Sovereign state: United Kingdom
- Post town: ST ALBANS
- Postcode district: AL2
- Dialling code: 01727
- Police: Hertfordshire
- Fire: Hertfordshire
- Ambulance: East of England
- UK Parliament: St Albans

Napsbury Park is a residential development in Hertfordshire, England. It is located to the north of London, at Junction 22 of the M25 motorway and Junction 6 of the M1 motorway. It is protected by a Conservation Area.

It is near St Albans and is part of the St Albans District. It falls within the Parish Council area of London Colney.

== Early history ==
Prehistoric or Roman activity is indicated by cropmarks to the east of the railway in Napsbury hospital grounds; and again on the north side of the hospital. Documentary evidence suggests the existence of a lost medieval settlement. Early Napsbury is mentioned in the Domesday Book, when it was called Absa and owned by Cedric, a vassall of Archbishop Stigand. It had a house called Tylehouse which was associated with tile and brick workings. It is known that there were people settled there with tofts, smallholdings or farms, since tithes were payable in the 14th century. The house on the Napsbury estate was later owned by Sir Nicholas Bacon, father of Sir Francis Bacon.

== Napsbury Hospital ==
The site was occupied by the Middlesex County Asylum in 1905. This asylum, which became Napsbury Hospital, continued to operate on the site until its closure in 1998.

== Redevelopment ==
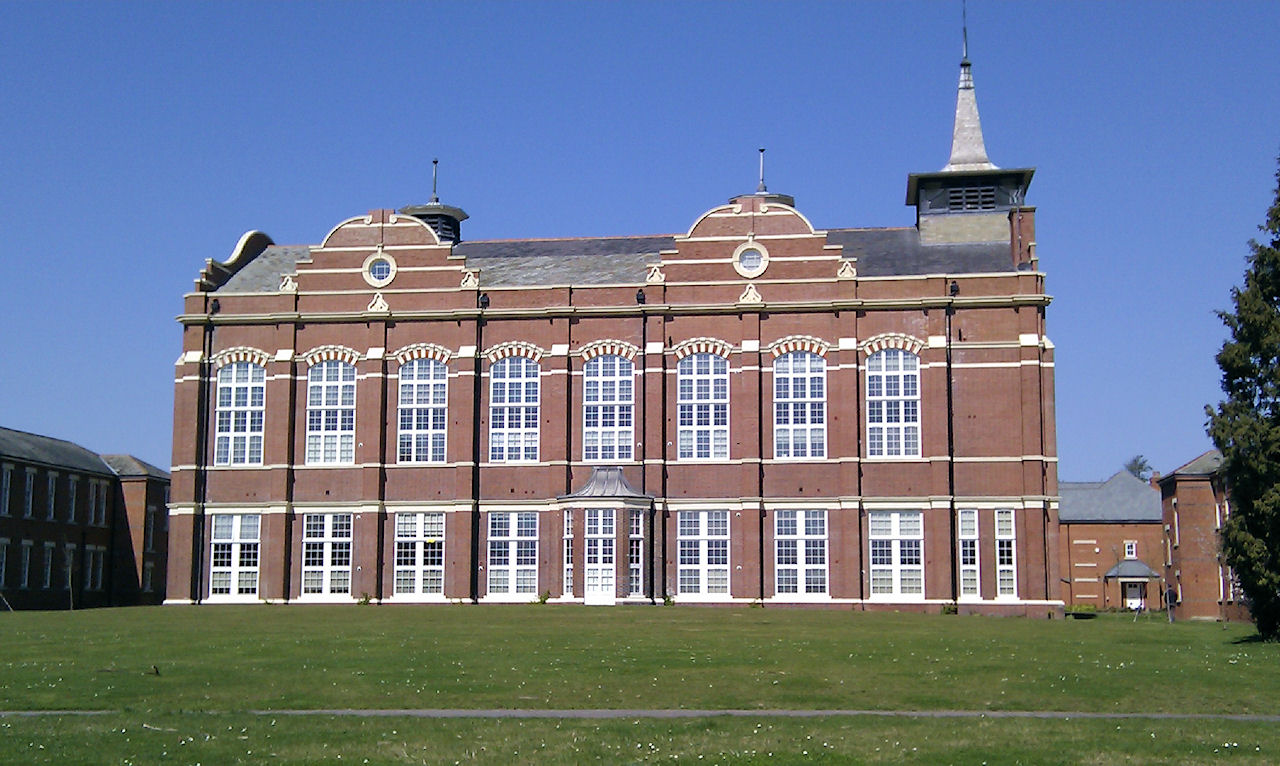
Renovated West Hall

After the closure of the hospital, Crest Nicholson acquired the site and built the current residential development around the existing wood and parkland areas. Now consisting of approximately 500 residences spread over newly built detached, terraced and townhouses also apartments converted from the original buildings. Features include multi-use tennis courts, cricket and sports pitches, a sports pavilion building and footpaths throughout the extensive woodland.

There is currently planning permission for the first commercial and retail units on the site, which will, it is claimed, build upon the settlement's village status.

== Transport ==
=== Bus ===
The 658 bus directly serves Napsbury Park and connects the estate with St Albans, London Colney, Shenley and Borehamwood. The nearby bus stop at London Colney High Street is called upon by

- the 602 bus which connects to St Albans, Watford, Radlett and Hatfield
- the 84 bus which connects with St Albans, Potters Bar and Barnet.

=== Rail ===
Napsbury railway station was built by the Midland Railway in 1905 on its line to St Pancras station. Consisting of an island platform between the slow lines, with a siding serving the Middlesex County Asylum at Napsbury, it closed in 1959. Radlett railway station is still open.
