= Kingsley Green =

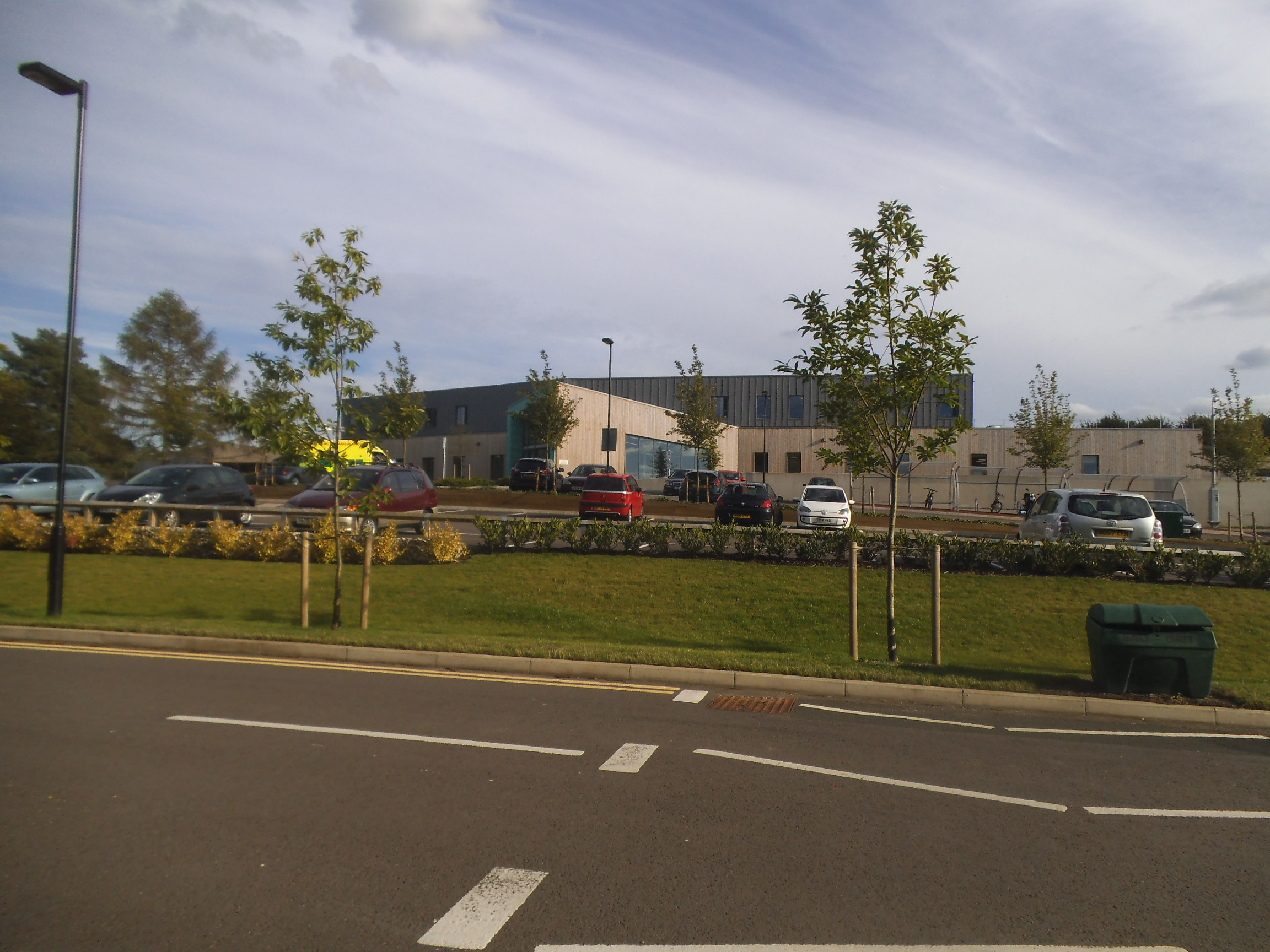
- Kingsley Green Hospital in 2015

- Shown in Hertfordshire

Geography
- Location: London Colney, Hertfordshire, England, United Kingdom
- Coordinates: 51.704670°N 0.305189°W

Organisation
- Care system: National Health Service
- Type: Mental health

Services
- Beds: 30

History
- Founded: 1928

Links
- Website: www.hpft.nhs.uk
- Lists: Hospitals in England

Kingsley Green is a mental health and learning disability site in Hertfordshire, England, just southeast of the village of London Colney.

Located on Harper Lane, Shenley, the facility was known as Harperbury Hospital for 61 years and has been a fixture of the area's mental health provision since 1928. It had two sister institutions, Shenley Hospital and Napsbury Hospital, within a few miles of its location. A scaling-down process began in the 1970s, and resulted in many of the old hospital's buildings becoming abandoned. By late 2001, Harperbury had only about 200 patients and the hospital was closed.

The new Kingsley Green mental health facility opened on the site in May 2009.

== History ==
=== Formation ===
The Royal Flying Corps, who were based at the London Colney aerodrome, used the site as an aircraft storage facility during the First World War. In 1924 Middlesex County Council purchased Porters Park Estate, totaling 420 acres (170 ha) to create both the Harperbury and Shenley hospitals.

On 25 October 1928, the new mental hospital started operations as the Hangers Certified Institution named after the three remaining aerodrome hangers on the site. The first patients were eight males who were put to the task of cleaning out the hangers, which were converted into wards for use by more patients. Soon eighty-six male patients lived and worked on the site.

=== Expansion ===
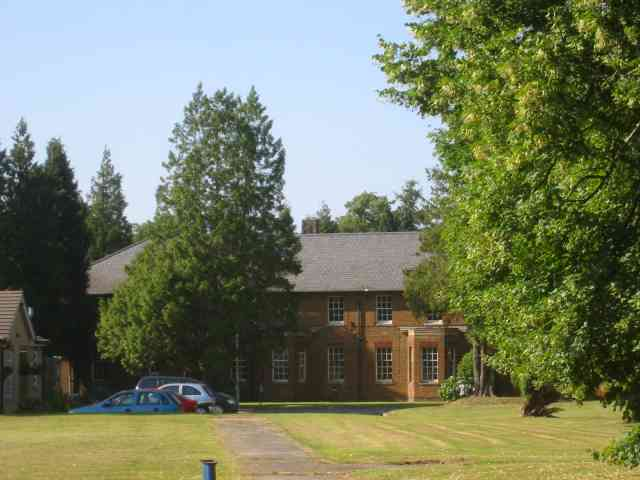
Harperbury Hospital in 2005

A series of new buildings were designed by WT Curtis and the construction, which was undertaken by constructed by John Laing & Son, commenced in 1929. The first of these new buildings opened in February 1931 and the institution housed 342 male patients by December 1931.

Various additional buildings were built to provide for the daily operation of the complex. Dormitory buildings were built for the patients and the De Salis Recreational Hall was built to seat 700 people. A building to house nurses was built west of the administration building. Tennis courts and sports grounds were also built. When the complex was completed in 1936, it accommodated male, female and pediatric patients. It is said at times 700 persons were employed at a time in the construction of the hospital.

Once the new buildings were completed, the institution was renamed Middlesex Colony in May 1936, when the facility was officially opened by Minister of Health Sir Kingsley Wood. Middlesex Colony was designed to house about 1,354 patients.

Middlesex Colony was intended to be as self-sufficient as possible, with the desire that patients capable of working would work at various tasks. Many of the male patients provided the labour for the farming ventures of the institution. Fruits and vegetables were raised and cattle, pigs and chickens were raised. Milk was even sold to Shenley Hospital. Men also worked in workshops to provide needed goods for the hospital, such as clothes, shoes, brushes and upholstery. They also performed carpentry. Female patients worked in the laundry and kitchens and helped keep the wards clean. Even pediatric patients were given duties. A school was built for the children. When the Second World War started, Middlesex Colony had 1,194 patients.

In 1948 Middlesex Colony passed from control of the county council to control of the National Health Service. Eventually the territory around the institution fell under the jurisdiction of Hertfordshire County. Two years later the institution was renamed Harperbury Hospital. During the 1950s Harperbury had 1,464 beds. An annex at Hemel Hempstead had thirty more beds. The 1950s saw continued expansion at Harperbury. Four more patient villas were built, as was a residence home for male nurses. A department of clinical psychology was established to better assess mental handicaps. The school for pediatric patients was enlarged and an indoor swimming pool was built.

In 1960 a cerebral palsy unit opened at Harperbury. It provided services to mental health units throughout the area, as well as at Harperbury. When Minister of Health Enoch Powell visited in 1961, he questioned the future role of large mental hospitals. Overcrowding at Harperbury was becoming a problem. By 1964 severe overcrowding had become severe. The hospital was then intended to accommodate 1,354 patients, but in fact had 1,587 patients. Beds were packed so tightly together, that sometimes nurses had problems reaching patients who needed emergency care.

In spite of overcrowding, Harperbury continued to expand. In 1965 the Kennedy-Galton Centre opened to study clinical genetics and to diagnose chromosomal abnormalities in the unborn. In 1969 an activity centre was officially opened to provide a stimulating environment for patients.

Up to 1973 Harperbury's expansion continued. Changes were made to use existing space better to ease overcrowding. Sometimes this involved remodeling areas. The activity centre was expanded in 1973 and a new playground was added.

=== Dismantlement ===
By the early 1970s patients were taking part in day trips to visit the shopping areas at nearby St Albans. Also, patients were encouraged to take better care of their appearance and they were encouraged to participate in sports events at the hospital and to take part in various rehabilitation groups. Musical events were held at Harperbury and severely handicapped deaf patients were taught the Makaton sign language. The wards were redecorated so that they were more attractive.

Following the introduction of Care in the Community in the early 1980s, plans were introduced to close the Shenley, Napsbury and Harperbury hospitals. Patients were moved out of all three hospitals. However, in 1995 and 1998 Harperbury received a temporary influx of patients as the other two institutions closed. By late 2001 Harperbury had only about 200 patients and the old hospital was officially closed.

The scaling down at Harperbury resulted in many of the old hospital's buildings becoming abandoned. In many cases much material and equipment were salvaged from the old buildings. Over the years most of the abandoned buildings were visited by vandals and other trespassers. Thieves ripped out copper wiring that on two occasions resulted in power disruptions and outages at Harperbury. Two men were arrested and charged in this incident.

In May 2009 a new mental health facility was created by converting space in old buildings into what became known as the Oak and Beech Units. In July 2011 this facility was renamed Kingsley Green after Sir Kingsley Wood, the minister of health who had originally opened the site as a mental institution.

== Current services ==
The site is now decentralised, with groups within the Hertfordshire Partnership University National Health Service Foundation Trust (presently abbreviated to HPFT) running various programmes on the site. The inpatient programmes consist of three units. One is a mental health facility that was created by converting space in old buildings into what is known as the Oak & Beech Units. Another programme is the Specialist Residential Service, which provides medium to long term care for 29 adults with learning disabilities and complex needs. Seven bungalows were built on Forest Lane at Harperbury. An activity service building is nearby.

Another inpatient unit is the Adolescent Inpatient Unit, located in Forest House. Up to 16 thirteen to seventeen year olds stay in Forest House. The programme "aims to provide a service which enables young people and their families to understand and cope with psychological, emotional and behavioural problems which they may be experiencing." An educational facility on site also ensures that residents' educational needs are not neglected. Adolescents are referred to Forest House by the Adolescent Outreach Team.

Kingsley Green houses the above mentioned Adolescent Outreach Team, which conducts its work in the outside community. Another unit providing adolescent care, the Adolescent Drug & Alcohol Service for Hertfordshire (abbreviated ADASH), is based on the Kingsley Green site. This service is geared towards those under 18 years of age who have drug or alcohol problems. ADASH provides advice, support, specialist assessment and treatment.
