= Shenley Hospital =

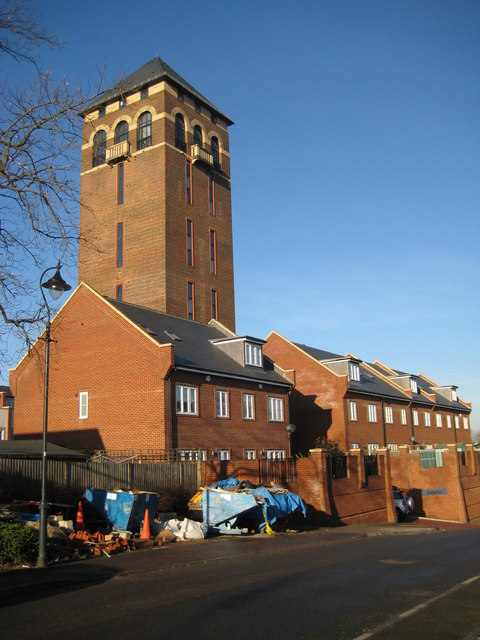
- The water tower at the former hospital which has been converted for residential use

- Shown in Hertfordshire

Geography
- Location: Shenley, Hertfordshire, England, United Kingdom
- Coordinates: 51°41′40″N 0°17′34″W

Organisation
- Care system: National Health Service
- Type: Mental health

History
- Founded: 1932
- Closed: 1998

Links
- Lists: Hospitals in England

Shenley Hospital was a psychiatric hospital at Shenley in Hertfordshire. It had two sister institutions, Harperbury Hospital and Napsbury Hospital, within a few miles of its location.

== History ==
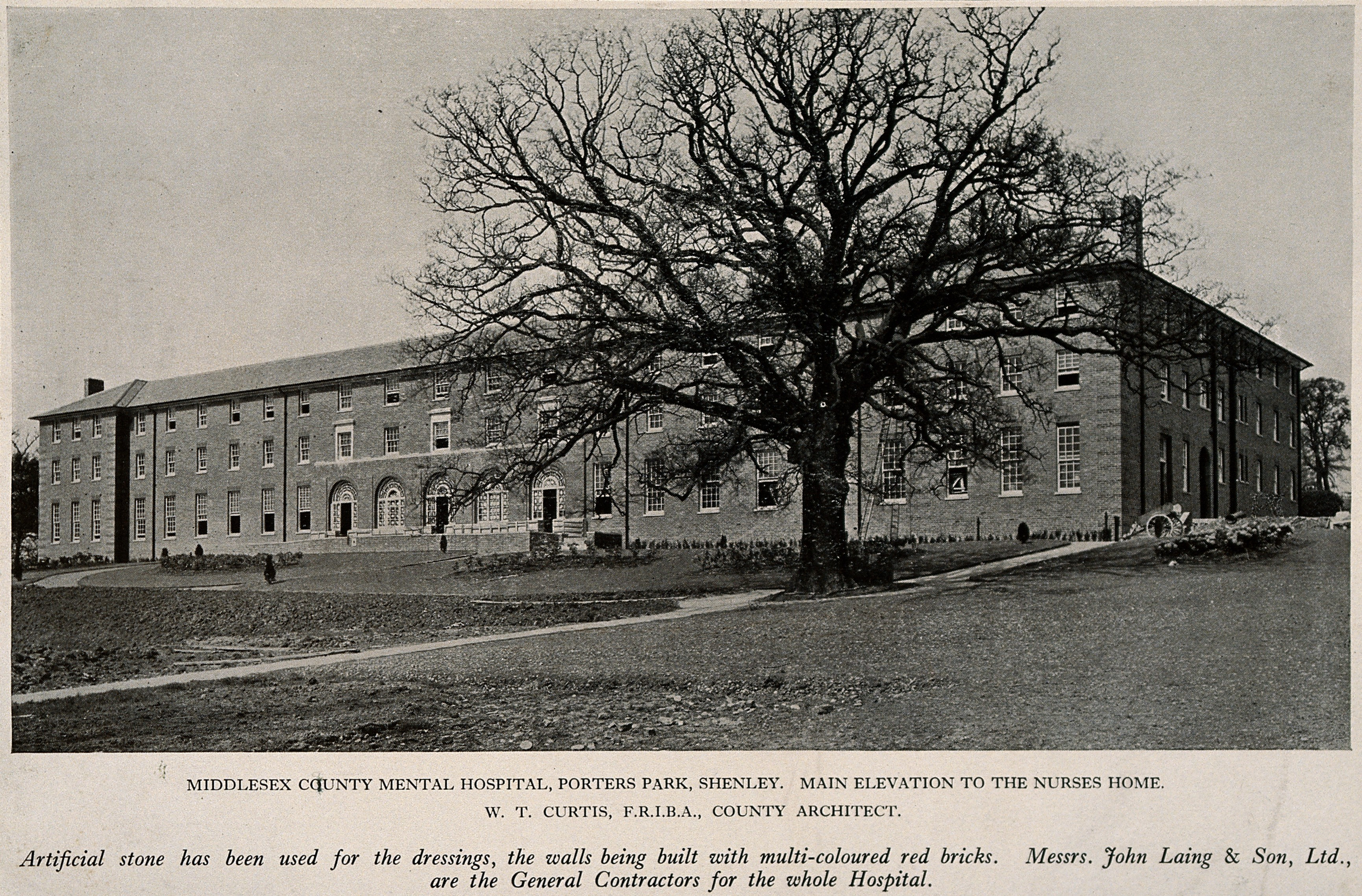
The nurses' block at Shenley Hospital in the 1930s

In 1924 Middlesex County Council purchased Porters Park Estate, totaling 420 acres (170 ha) to create both the Harperbury and Shenley hospitals.

The hospital was designed by WT Curtis and constructed by John Laing & Son with the first phase being completed in 1932. King George V and Queen Mary officially opened the hospital in 1934. The second phase of construction was undertaken between 1935 and 1938.

Patients underwent experimental treatments including malaria therapy to cure "insanity caused by syphilis", electro-convulsive therapy and insulin injections to remove psychotic thoughts.

During the Second World War, part of the facility was used as a military hospital. The hospital joined the National Health Service in 1948.

A walled garden was established in the 1950s so that patients could grow their own fruit and vegetables. A mother-and-baby unit was added in 1962.

Following the introduction of Care in the Community in the early 1980s, the hospital was downsized and eventually closed in 1998. The site was subsequently redeveloped for housing as Shenley Park.

== Sources ==
- Ritchie, Berry (1997). The Good Builder: The John Laing Story. James & James.
