= Shenley Hall =

Country house in Shenley, Hertfordshire, United Kingdom

Coordinates: 51°41′41″N 0°16′24″W

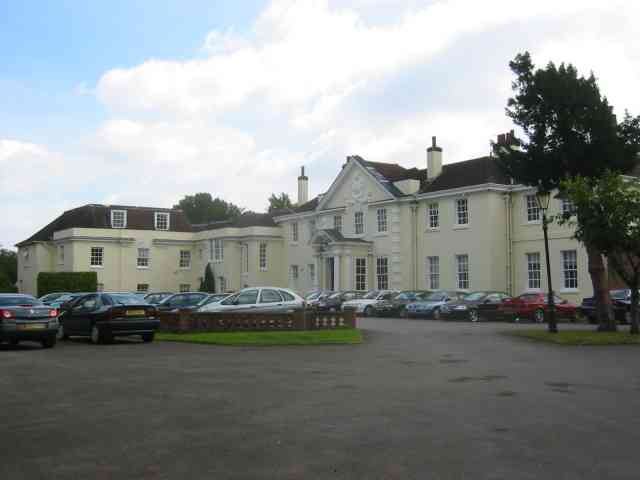
Shenley Hall

Shenley Hall is a Grade II listed English country house at Shenley in Hertfordshire.

== History ==
Built in the 19th century, the hall benefited from additions by Sir Edwin Lutyens in 1914 just before World War I. The hall featured in several episodes of The Avengers in the 1960s. Now owned by a transport software business, it is set in 16 acres of parkland and is Grade II listed.
