= Napsbury railway station =

Former railway station in England

Coordinates: 51°43′35.4″N 0°19′13.3″W

Napsbury
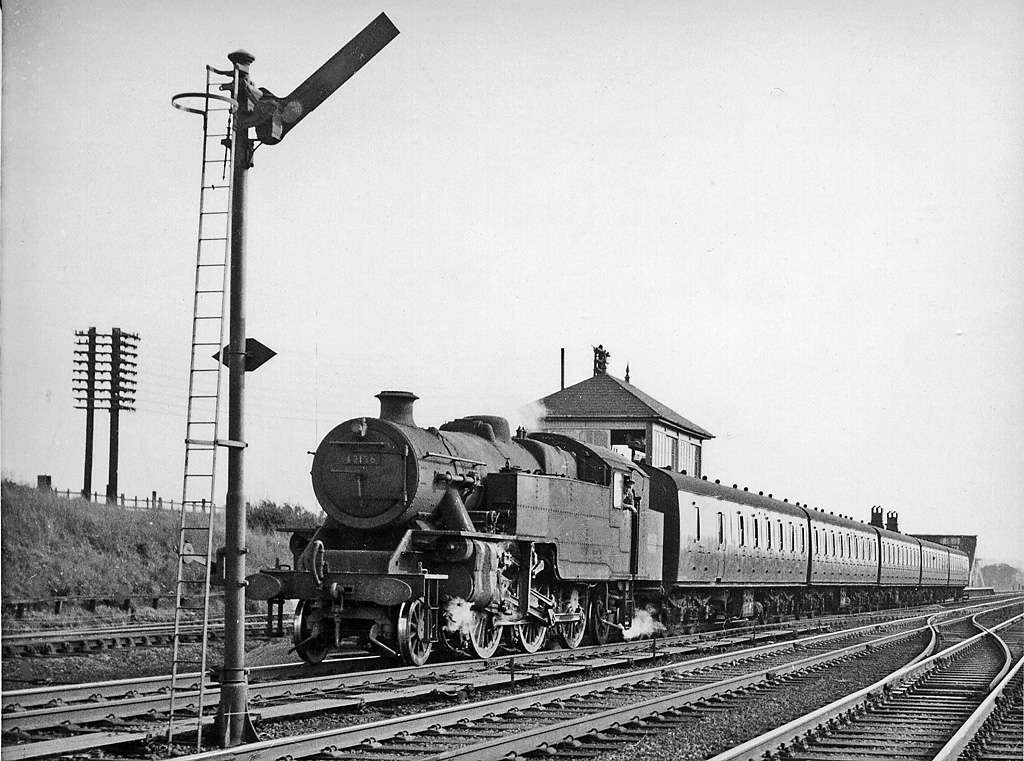
- Down local leaving Napsbury in 1958

General information
- Location: Napsbury, City of St Albans; England
- Grid reference: TL160044
- Platforms: 2

Other information
- Status: Disused

History
- Original company: Midland Railway
- Pre-grouping: Midland Railway
- Post-grouping: London, Midland and Scottish Railway

Key dates
- 19 June 1905: Opened
- 14 September 1959: Closed
Location

Napsbury railway station was built by the Midland Railway in 1905 on its line to St Pancras station.

It was never more than an island platform between the slow lines, with a siding serving the Middlesex County Asylum at Napsbury, and closed in 1959.

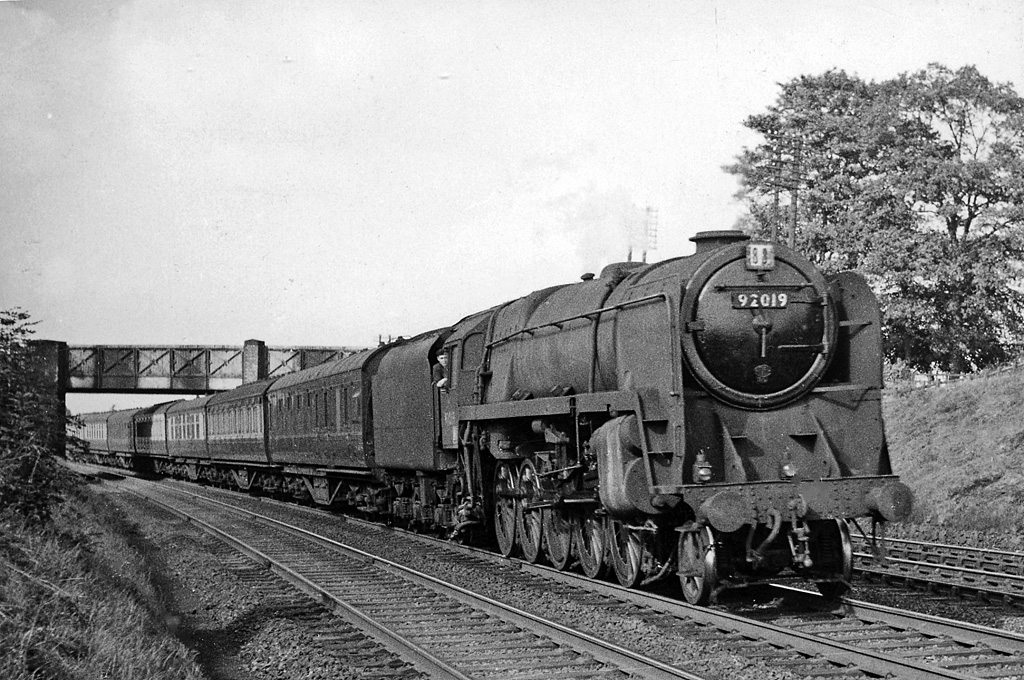
Up Empty Stock near Napsbury in 1958

20 July 1905 - Napsbury's first and only stationmaster John Thomas Cartledge began work: when he moved, in 1910, supervision of the station moved to the stationmaster at St Albans station

Preceding station	Historical railways	Following station
St Albans City; Line and station open	Midland Railway; Midland Main Line	Radlett; Line and station open
