= Napsbury Hospital =

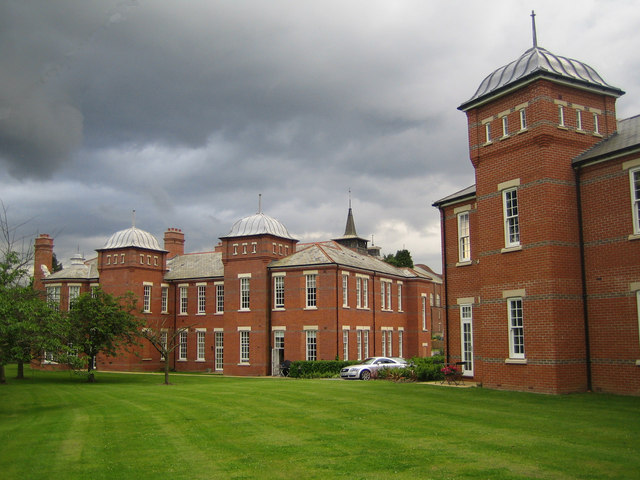
- Napsbury Hospital

- Shown in Hertfordshire

Geography
- Location: London Colney, England
- Coordinates: 51.723°N 0.310°W

Organisation
- Type: Mental health

History
- Founded: 1905
- Closed: 1998

Napsbury Hospital was a mental health facility in London Colney near St Albans in Hertfordshire. It had two sister institutions, Harperbury Hospital and Shenley Hospital, within a few miles of its location.

== History ==
The hospital was designed by Rowland Plumbe in the country estate style and was initially known as the Middlesex County Asylum.

The hospital was designed for 1,205 residents, and the grounds were designed by William Goldring. Following the construction of the numerous buildings and extensive grounds, Napsbury opened on 3 June 1905. According to the Middlesex County Record, the initial cost, including land and equipment, was £545,000, or £473 per bed. In 1908 Plumbe designed an extension to accommodate a further 600 patients.

During the First World War, Napsbury was used for and known as the County of Middlesex War Hospital, which treated wounded soldiers. Following the war, the hospital was returned to its original purpose.

Although Napsbury suffered some bomb damage in the Blitz, it was in continuous use as a hospital until its official closure in 1998. However, until at least 2002 one building was still in use for psychiatric patients.

Due to its largely untouched parkland, Napsbury was listed by English Heritage as a Grade II Historic Park and Garden in 2001. The site has been redeveloped for residential use as Napsbury Park.

== Famous residents ==
Famous residents of the hospital included:

- Ivor Gurney, English poet and artist
- Louis Wain, English artist
- Opal Whiteley, American nature writer
