= Louis Wain =

English artist (1860–1939)

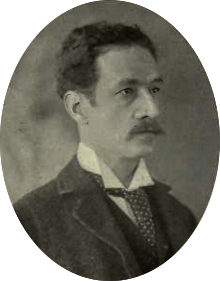
- Wain in 1903
- Born: Louis William Wain; 5 August 1860; Clerkenwell, London, England
- Died: 4 July 1939 (aged 78); Napsbury Hospital, London Colney, Hertfordshire, England
- Resting place: St Mary's Catholic Cemetery, Kensal Green, London
- Occupation: Artist
- Spouse: Emily Richardson (m. 1884; died 1887)

Louis William Wain (5 August 1860 – 4 July 1939) was an English artist best known for his drawings of anthropomorphised cats and kittens.

Wain was born in Clerkenwell, London. He sold his first drawing in 1881 and the following year gave up his teaching position at the West London School of Art to become a full-time illustrator. He married in 1884 but was widowed three years later. In 1890 he moved to the Kent coast with his mother and five sisters and, except for three years spent in New York, remained there until the family returned to London in 1917. In 1914, he suffered a severe head injury in a horse-drawn omnibus accident and ten years later was certified insane. He spent the remaining fifteen years of his life in mental hospitals, where he continued to draw and paint. Some of his later abstract paintings have been seen as precursors of psychedelic art.

Wain produced hundreds of drawings and paintings a year for periodicals and books, including Louis Wain's Annual which ran from 1901 to 1921. His work also appeared on postcards and advertising, and he made brief ventures into ceramics and animated cartoons. In spite of his popularity and prolific output, Wain did not become wealthy, possibly because he sold his work cheaply and relinquished copyright, and also because he supported his mother and five sisters.

== Early life ==
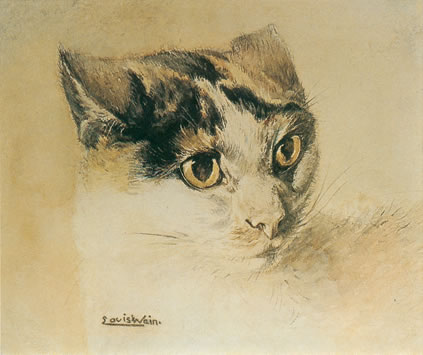
A realistically drawn cat from early in Wain's career

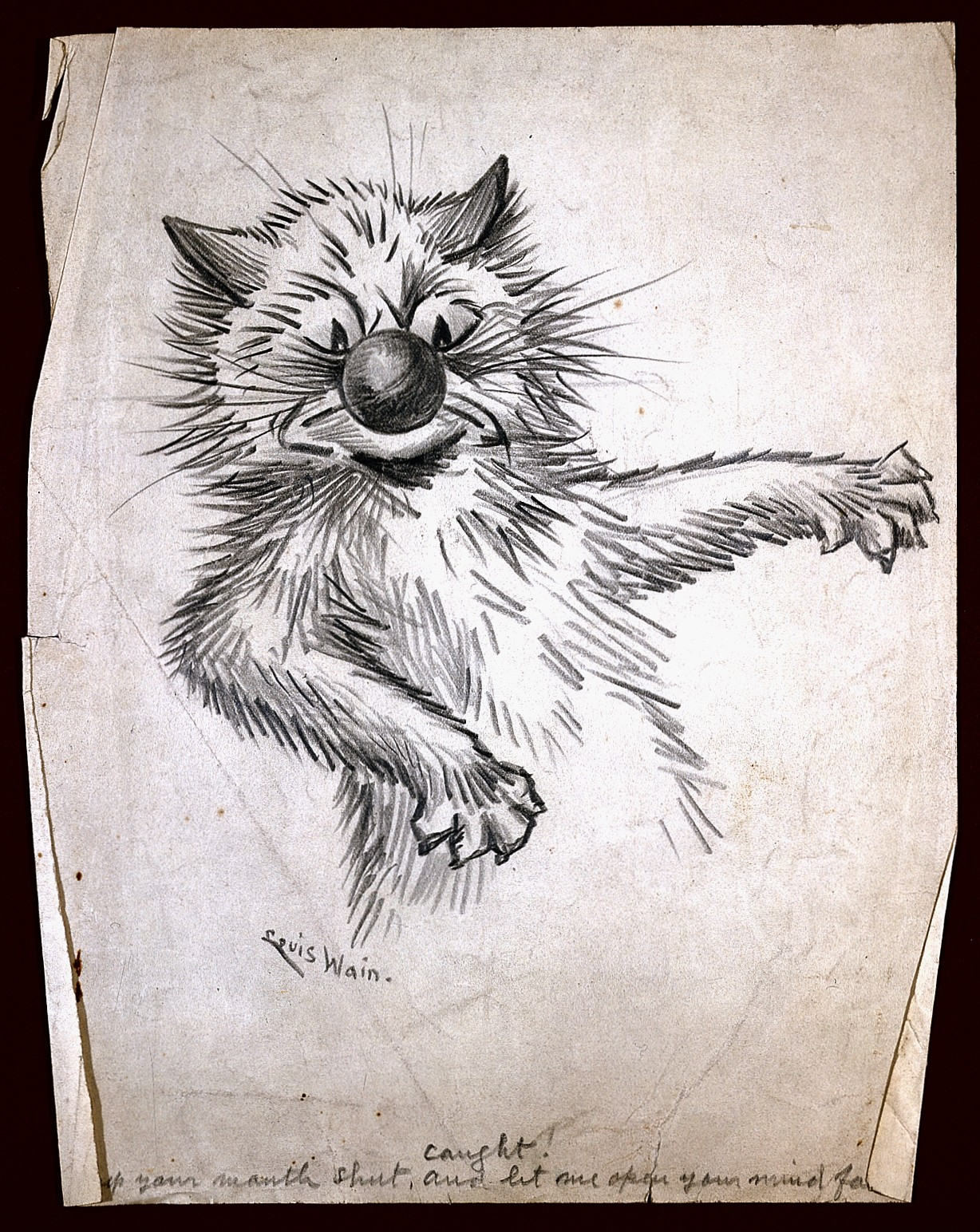
Drawing by Louis Wain titled 'Caught! Keep your mouth shut and let me open your mind for you'

Wain was born on 5 August 1860 in Clerkenwell in London. His father, William Matthew Wain (1825–1880), was a textile trader, living in London but originally from Leek, Staffordshire; his mother, Julie Felicie Boiteux (1833–1910), was a church embroiderer from a family of French origin. Wain's maternal grandfather, Louis Boiteux, was an artist. Wain was the first child and only boy in the family. He had five younger sisters: Caroline, Josephine, Marie, Claire and Felicie.

Wain was born with a cleft lip and as a child was not in good health; he did not attend school until he was ten. He was sent first to Orchard Street Foundation School in South Hackney but spent much of his time playing truant and wandering around London, attending lectures at the Royal Polytechnic Institution or going on insect-hunting expeditions into the countryside. From 1873 to 1876 he attended St Joseph's Academy in Kennington, a Catholic school (the Wain family was Catholic). He then did a course at the West London School of Art and was taken on as an assistant master at the school.

== Artistic career ==
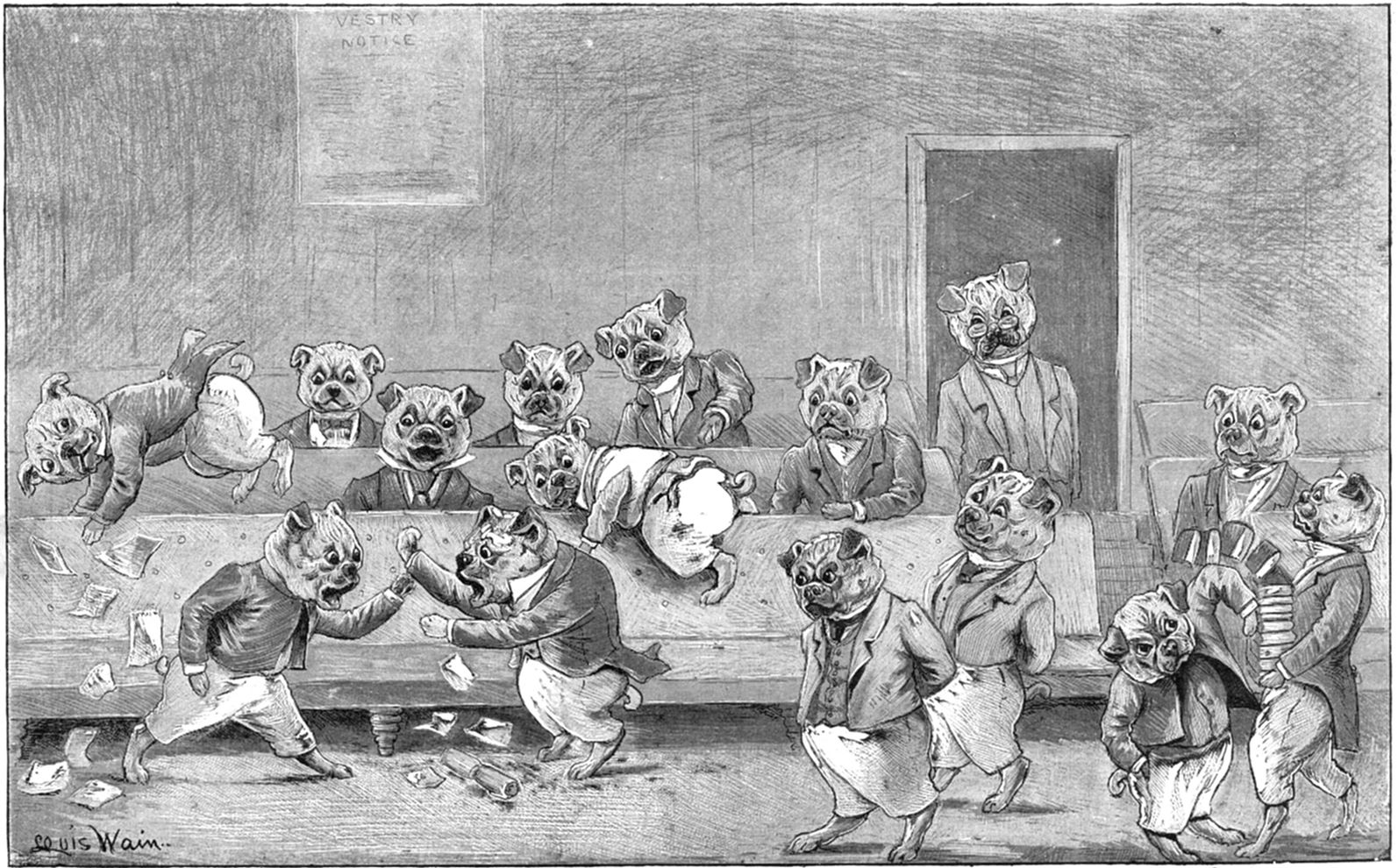
An early Louis Wain caricature, featuring pugs rather than cats

In December 1881, Wain's first drawing to be published appeared in the Christmas 1881 issue of the Illustrated Sporting and Dramatic News. It was a picture of bullfinches on laurel bushes, given the wrong title of "Robins Breakfast". The following year he was offered a position on the magazine and was able to give up his teaching position at the West London School of Art.

On 30 January 1884 Wain married Emily Marie Richardson, who had been the governess of his sisters, in St Mary's Chapel, Hampstead. The couple lived in Hampstead and were joined by Peter, a black-and-white kitten. Emily developed breast cancer soon after the marriage; Peter was a comfort to her and also, as Wain would later say, laid the foundation of his career as a cat artist. Encouraged by his wife, Wain sold his first published cat drawings to The Illustrated London News in 1884. At this time he was also reporting on agricultural shows and pet shows, and taking commissions for animal portraits. By 1886 his cat pictures had been more widely noticed and he was commissioned by Macmillan to illustrate a children's book, Mrs Tabby's Establishment. His fame became established with the publication in the 1886 Christmas edition of The Illustrated London News of his first drawing of anthropomorphised cats, A Kitten's Christmas Party, which shows 150 cats celebrating Christmas in eleven panels. Wain had little time to share his success with his wife; Emily died in January 1887 after just three years of marriage.

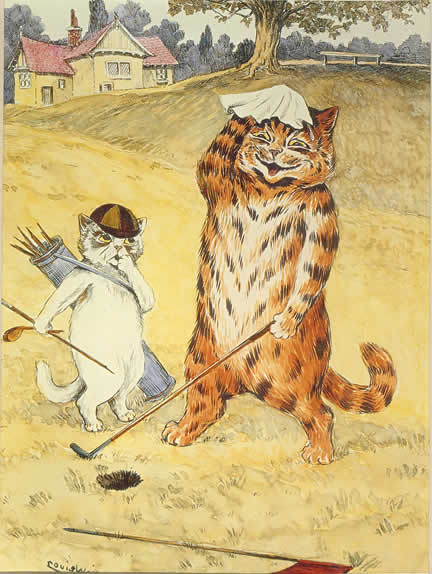
Wain is known for his anthropomorphic cats.

As a young widower, Wain rented rooms in New Cavendish Street in the City of Westminster and moved in somewhat Bohemian circles that included journalists and artists such as Herbert Railton, Caton Woodville, Linley Sambourne, Harry Furniss, Melton Prior, and Phil May. At musical evenings, he would improvise on the piano. He worked to build up his reputation by taking on commissions for a variety of subjects, including architectural and landscape drawings as well as animals, for a number of journals. By 1890 he was a household name, and, in acknowledgment of his expertise on cats, was elected president of the National Cat Club. Two illustrations of cats' Christmas parties in 1890 marked a new development in his style of drawing cats, as they took on more human features with Wain often doing preliminary sketches of people in public places.

Wain's father had died in 1880. His relationship with his mother and five sisters, none of whom married, had been strained as they had not approved of his marriage to Emily. But in 1890 there was a reconciliation and the family moved to the seaside resort of Westgate-on-Sea, Kent, where they rented a house belonging to Sir William Ingram, managing director of the Illustrated London News. Wain took up gardening and walking, as well as various sports including running, swimming, ice skating, boxing and fencing. Two of Wain's sisters, Claire and Felicie, were talented artists, but it was Wain who had to support the whole family and, although he was a popular and successful artist, money was always short. Bills were sometimes paid with pictures. Selling his pictures together with the copyright cheaply to publishers meant that he did not receive royalties when his work was reproduced and left him in straitened circumstances in later life.

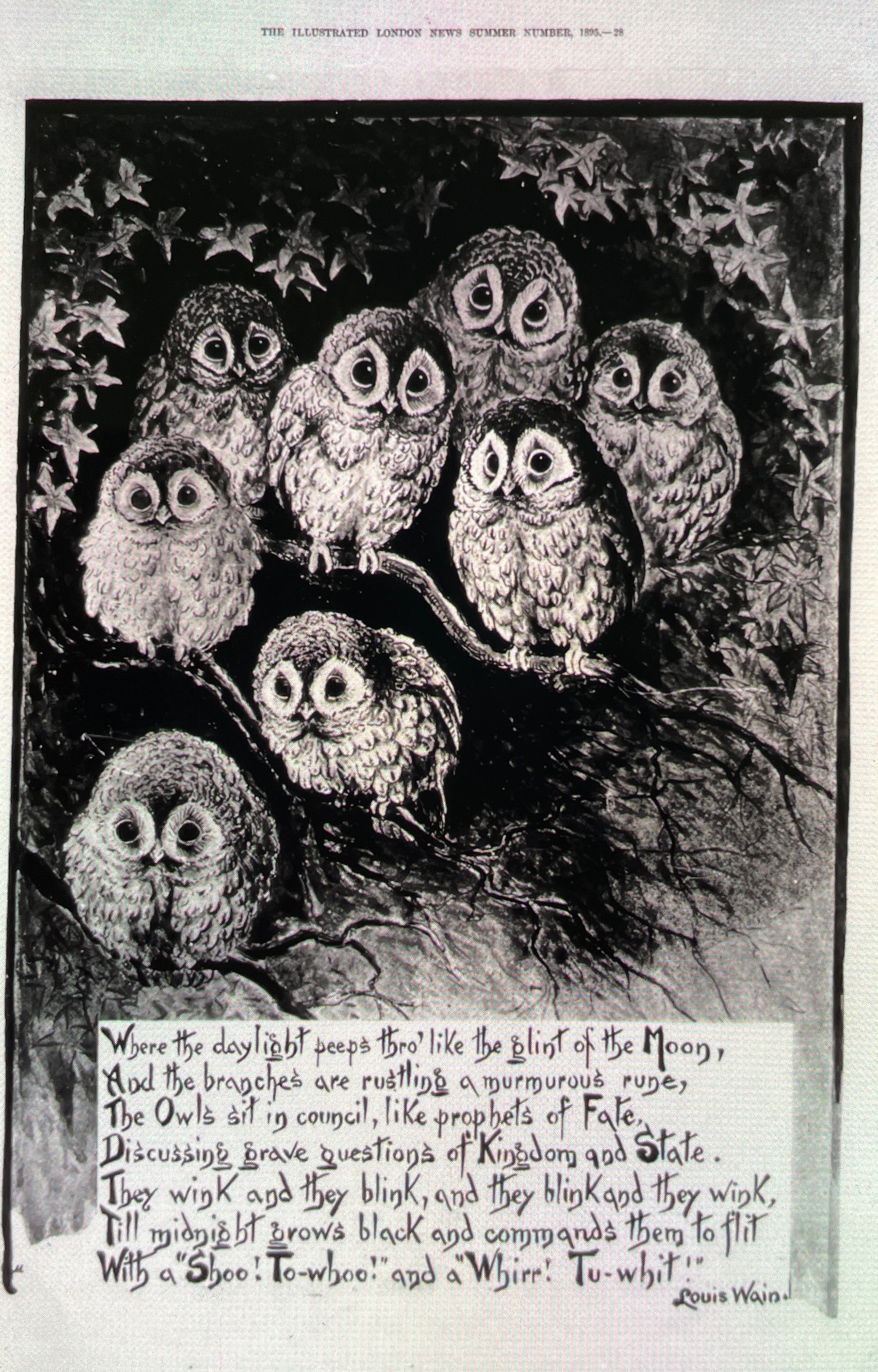
Poem on Owls by Louis Wain

Wain was a prolific artist, completing hundreds of pictures a year. His early work was mostly for periodicals but in the 1890s he turned his hand to illustrating children's books; over his lifetime there would be more than 100. He wrote many of the books he illustrated, and, as an acknowledged expert on cats, contributed the section on the domestic cat in Hutchinson's The Living Animals of the World (1901). In 1901, Wain produced the first Louis Wain Annual, which were published every year from 1901 to 1915 and in 1921. Between 1900 and 1940, 75 different publishers, including Raphael Tuck & Sons and Valentine & Sons, produced over 1100 of his images in postcard form. His work was also used in advertisements. Wain worked with a variety of media including watercolour, body colour, (Note: Watercolour which is mixed with white pigment to make it opaque.) pen and ink, pencil, silverpoint, chalk and oil. His period of greatest popularity was in the years before World War I when he portrayed Edwardian society at leisure. His cats dressed as humans took part in sports, went to the seaside, tea parties, restaurants and celebrated Christmas, with activities sometimes ending in mishap and mayhem. Wain's world was "funny, edgy and animated".

In 1907, while his mother and sisters remained in Kent, Wain left for New York, where he was offered a contract by Hearst Newspapers. He returned to England in 1910, following the death of his mother. In 1914, he produced a series of "futurist" ceramic cats, described by one reviewer as "the latest thing in freak ornaments". In October 1914, Wain fell from the platform of an omnibus in London and suffered a head injury which left him in a coma. He spent three weeks in hospital and was ordered to rest for six months. In 1917, Wain and his four surviving sisters left Westgate and moved to Kilburn in London. Marie Louisa had died in 1913 after twelve years spent in the East Kent County Lunatic Asylum. His eldest sister, Caroline, died of influenza soon after the move to Kilburn.

== Later life and death ==
By the end of World War I, demand for Wain's pictures had declined significantly and, in spite of commissions from the publisher Valentine & Sons for a series of children's books, his financial situation deteriorated. He made a short-lived venture into film animation, drawing the first-ever screen cartoon cat, named "Pussyfoot", but the cartoons were not a cinema success. Hutchinson published a last Louis Wain Annual in 1921. A new aspect to Wain's drawings in this volume was the prominence of patterned fabrics.

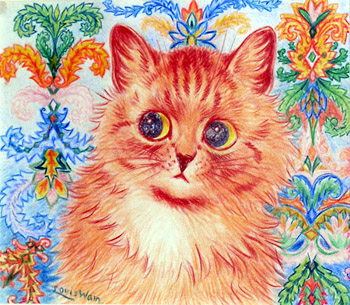
This cat, like many in Wain's later paintings, is shown with abstract patterns behind it.

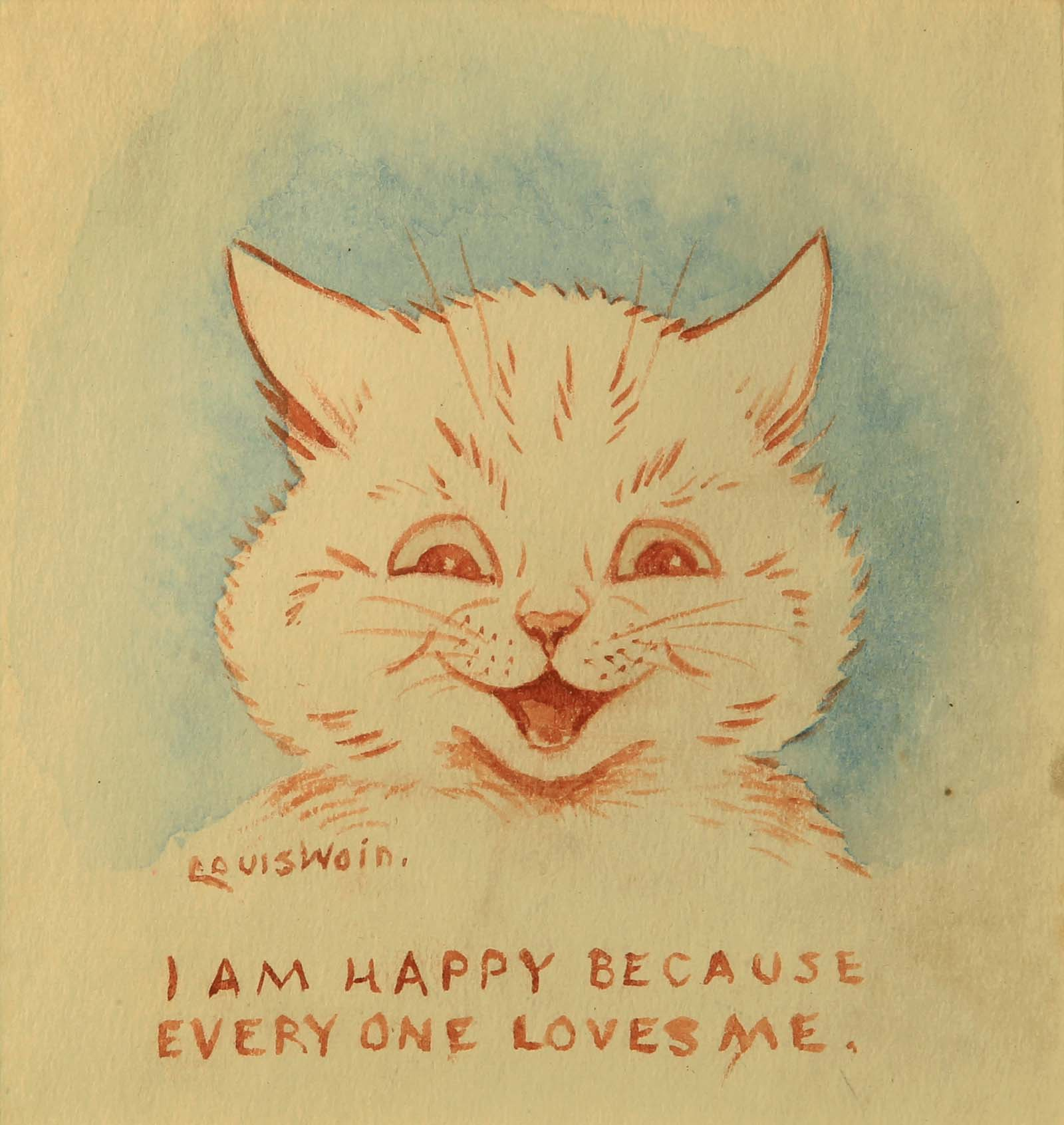
I Am Happy Because Everyone Loves Me, c. 1928

In 1924, Wain's sisters had him certified insane and admitted to a pauper ward at Springfield Mental Hospital in Tooting, South London. He continued to produce artworks in the hospital, with his sisters removing his pictures to sell. When the bookseller Dan Rider, who was on an asylum visiting committee, came across Wain in the hospital, he set up an appeal to raise money for the artist. An exhibition of Wain's work was arranged and more than £2,300 (over £121,000 in 2025) was raised, although only £640 of this found its way to Wain and his sisters, who had also become beneficiaries of the fund. Prime Minister Ramsay MacDonald then set up a fund for Wain's sisters and also arranged civil list pensions for them "in recognition of their brother's services to popular art". Wain had in the meantime been transferred to more comfortable conditions at Bethlem Hospital, where a fellow patient later recalled him as "a very gentle amiable old man always clean and neat... He was liked by all the curious mixture of humanity that was, at that time, suffering from some kind or other of mental stress." In May 1930, he was moved again to Napsbury Hospital in Hertfordshire, where he continued to draw and paint. A successful exhibition of his work was held at the Brook Street Art Galleries in 1931, with proceeds going to his sisters. During this period Wain still drew cats, some of them stylised, but also drew landscapes in vivid colours. At Christmas he participated in decorating the wards, as he had done at Bethlem, and painted Christmas scenes on mirrors.

In November 1938, Wain suffered a stroke. His health further declined and he died on 4 July 1939; he was buried in St Mary's Catholic Cemetery, Kensal Green. He was survived by two sisters, Claire and Felicie, his sister Josephine having died six months before him. A memorial exhibition was held in Brook Street Galleries in September 1939.

== Legacy ==
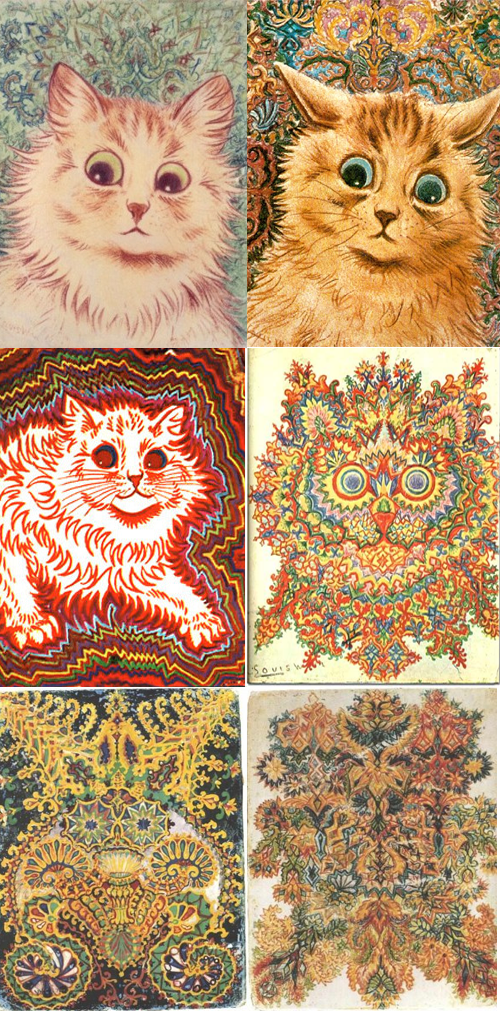
Cats in various styles from Wain's later years in unknown chronological order

During an August 1925 British Broadcasting Company broadcast, the writer H. G. Wells said of Wain in a statement read on his behalf by Robert Loraine in support of the appeal for Wain: "He has made the cat his own. He invented a cat style, a cat society, a whole cat world. English cats that do not look and live like Louis Wain cats are ashamed of themselves." The same year Ramsay MacDonald wrote: "Louis Wain was on all our walls some 15 to 20 years ago. Probably no artist has given a greater number of young people pleasure than he has".

Wain was seen as a leading authority on cats, becoming president and chairman of the National Cat Club and serving as a judge in cat shows. He was also in demand by the growing number of organisations devoted to animal welfare. He was seen as responsible for raising the social status of cats, of taking them from the parlour to a position where even members of parliament could proudly announce their enthusiasm for them without fear of ridicule. In spite of his undoubted expertise, some of Wain's theories on the breeding and nature of cats were seen as eccentric, just as were some of his ideas on philosophy and science.

Since Wain spent the last fifteen years of his life in mental hospitals, there has been speculation about his mental condition and suggestions that he was suffering from schizophrenia, with examples of his art appearing in several psychology text books in chapters covering the disorder. In 1939, a psychiatrist, Walter Maclay, found some paintings by Wain in a shop in Campden Hill and put them in a sequence that, he claimed, showed evidence of a deterioration in the artist's mental state due to schizophrenia, even though the paintings were not dated. Maclay's theory has been challenged as Wain was still producing paintings in his old style, as well as more abstract "kaleidoscopic" designs, while at Napsbury. Marking the centenary of Wain's birth in The Guardian, cat expert Sidney Denham suggested that Wain's breakdown had been triggered by his head injury, coming after a number of severe mental shocks.

== In popular culture ==
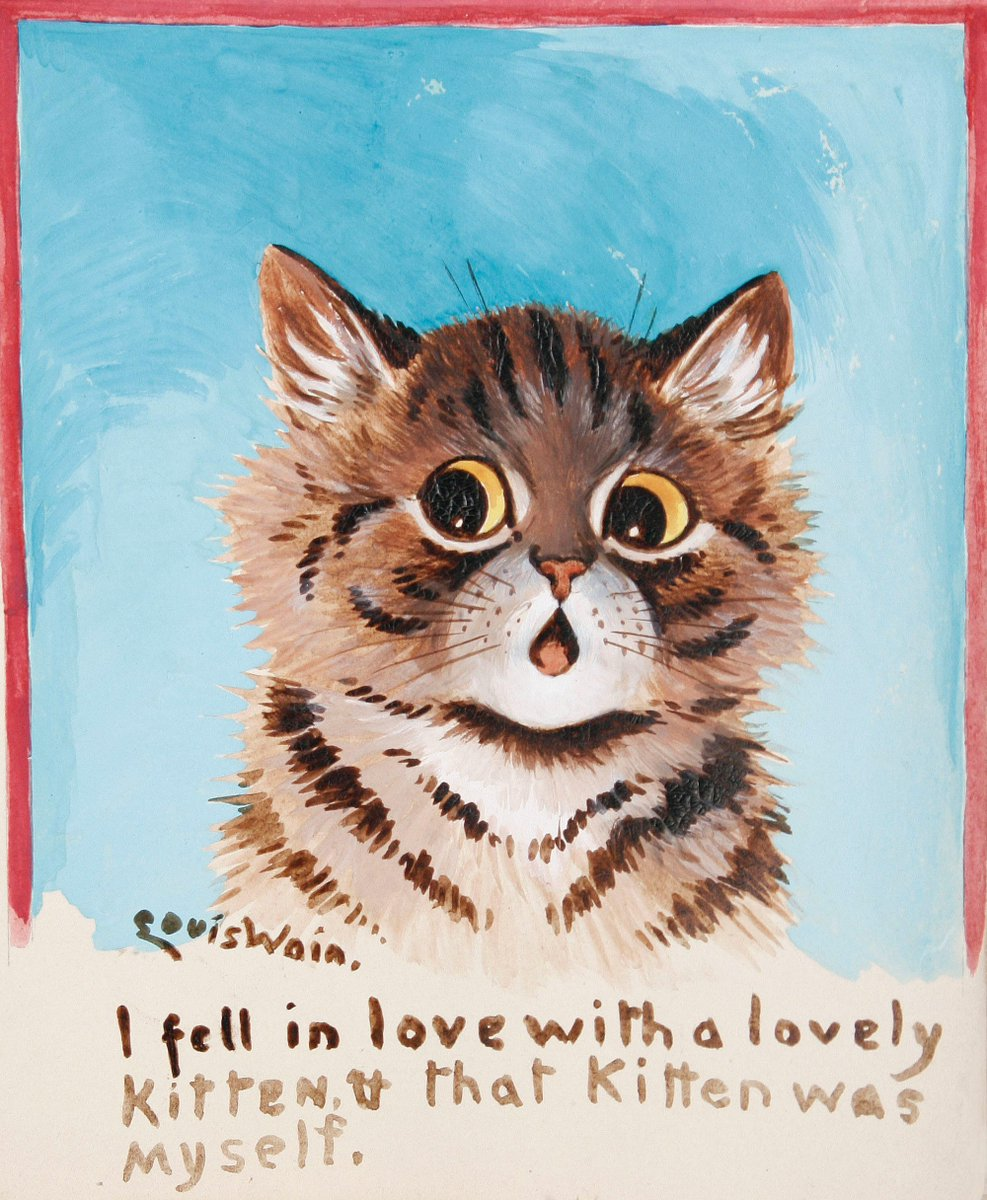
"I fell in love with a lovely kitten. & that kitten was myself."

Wain's later work, where his cats dissolve into kaleidoscopic abstract patterns, has been identified as an important precursor to 1960s psychedelic art.

In 1972, the Victoria and Albert Museum devoted a major exhibition to Wain's work.

Wain's life is the subject of The Electrical Life of Louis Wain, a 2021 Amazon Studios production starring Benedict Cumberbatch as Wain and Claire Foy as his wife Emily Richardson.

== Bibliography ==
- All Sorts of Comical Cats. Verses by Clifton Bingham London: Ernest Nister
- Fun at the Zoo with Verses By Clifton Bingham
- Funny Favourites. Forty-five Pen-and-Ink Drawings by Louis Wain. London. Ernest Nister.
- Madame Tabby's Establishment (1886)
- Our Farm: The Trouble of Successes Thereof (1888)
- Dreams by French Firesides (1890)
- Peter, A Cat O'One Tail: His Life and Adventures (1892)
- Old Rabbit the Voodoo and Other Sorcerers (1893)
- Fun and Frolic, with verses by Clifton Bingham, London: Ernest Nister (1900).
- The Dandy Lion (1901)
- Cats (1902)
- Pa Cats, Ma Cats and their kittens (1903)
- The Louis Wain Kitten Book (1903)
- Claws and Paws (1904)
- Mixed Pickles by Louis Wain (c. 1905)
- Cat's Cradle (1908)
- Pantomime Pussies (c. 1908)
- Louis Wain's Cat Painting Book (c. 1910)
- Louis Wain's Cats and Dogs (c. 1910)
- The Louis Wain Nursery Book (c. 1910)
- Louis Wain's Cat Mascot (postcard coloring book, c. 1910)
- Father Tuck's Struwwelpeter As Seen by Louis Wain, Told in Merry Rhymes by Norman Gale (c. 1910), second Edition Fidgety Phil and Other Tales (c. 1925)
- The Happy Family (c. 1914)
- Daddy Cat (1915)
- Little Red Riding Hood and Other Tales (1919)
- Music in Pussytown (c. 1920)
- Somebody's Pussies (1925)
- The Boy who Shares My Name (1926)
