= Rowland Plumbe =

English architect

- Roland Plumbe
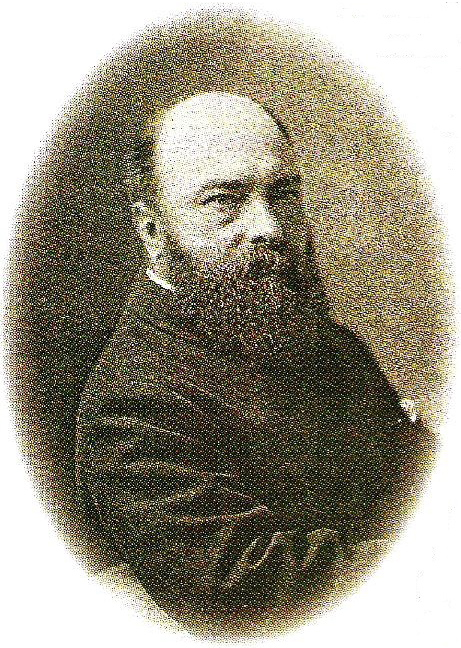
- Born: 2 February 1838; Whitechapel
- Died: 2 April 1919 (aged 81); Willesden
- Resting place: Highgate Cemetery
- Citizenship: England
- Occupation: Architect

Rowland Plumbe, also known as Roland Plumbe (2 February 1838, Whitechapel – 2 April 1919, Willesden), was an English architect, famous for being the author of many residential schemes across London, many being considered the first examples of the Victorian Garden City.

== Biography ==
Plumbe was born on 2 February 1838 in Whitechapel. After leaving university college he was articled to Nockalls Johnson Cottingham and Frederick Peek, then spent 2 years in America with Frederick Clarke Withers, returning to London in 1860 to start his own practice. Over a long career he designed a wide variety of buildings including churches, hospitals and housing, from the modest to the grand.

His churches include the red-brick Perpendicular Gothic Revival St John the Baptist's Church at Loxwood, West Sussex and red brick Grade II listed St Margaret, Streatham Hill.

Hospitals designed by Plumbe include thirty years of work on the London Hospital, new wings at Poplar Hospital between 1891 and 1902 and Napsbury Hospital, London Colney completed in 1905. He also designed the entertainment hall (completed 1879) at the Normansfield home for people with a learning disability in Teddington, built at the instigation of John Langdon Down.

The Artizans, Labourers & General Dwellings Company (Artizans Company) was established to build low rise, high-quality houses for the working classes in open countryside, alongside existing railway lines, to allow workers to live in rural surroundings and commute into the city. In 1881 they appointed Plumbe to design their Noel Park estate with 2,200 houses in five classes. At the other end of the residential scale, Plumbe redesigned Woodlands Park House, now Woodlands Park Hotel, in Cobham for industrialist William Bryant. In contrast, Fieldgate Mansions in Whitechapel, completed in 1907 were tenement blocks in a very urban setting.

Other examples of his London work include warehousing in Ray Street and offices in Old Street. He also designed Oatlands School, Walton-on-Thames and the entertainment hall (completed 1879) at the Normansfield home for people with a learning disability in Teddington, built at the instigation of John Langdon Down.

His students include Charles Worley, who was articled to him in 1870.

He died on 2 April 1919 and is buried in a family grave on the eastern side of Highgate Cemetery.

== Gallery ==
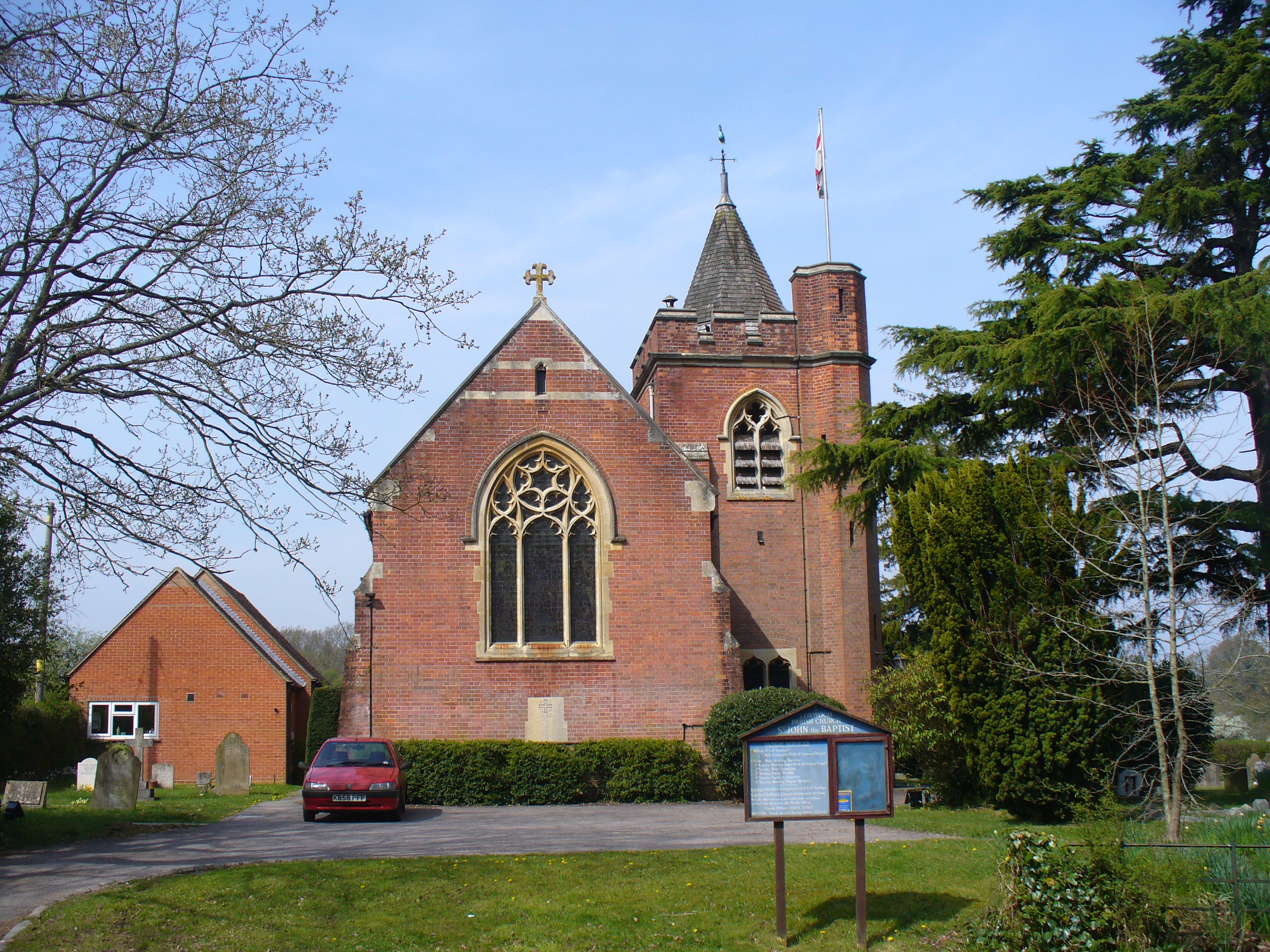
St John the Baptist's Church, Loxwood, West Sussex

Early designs for houses in Noel Park, Hornsey, London

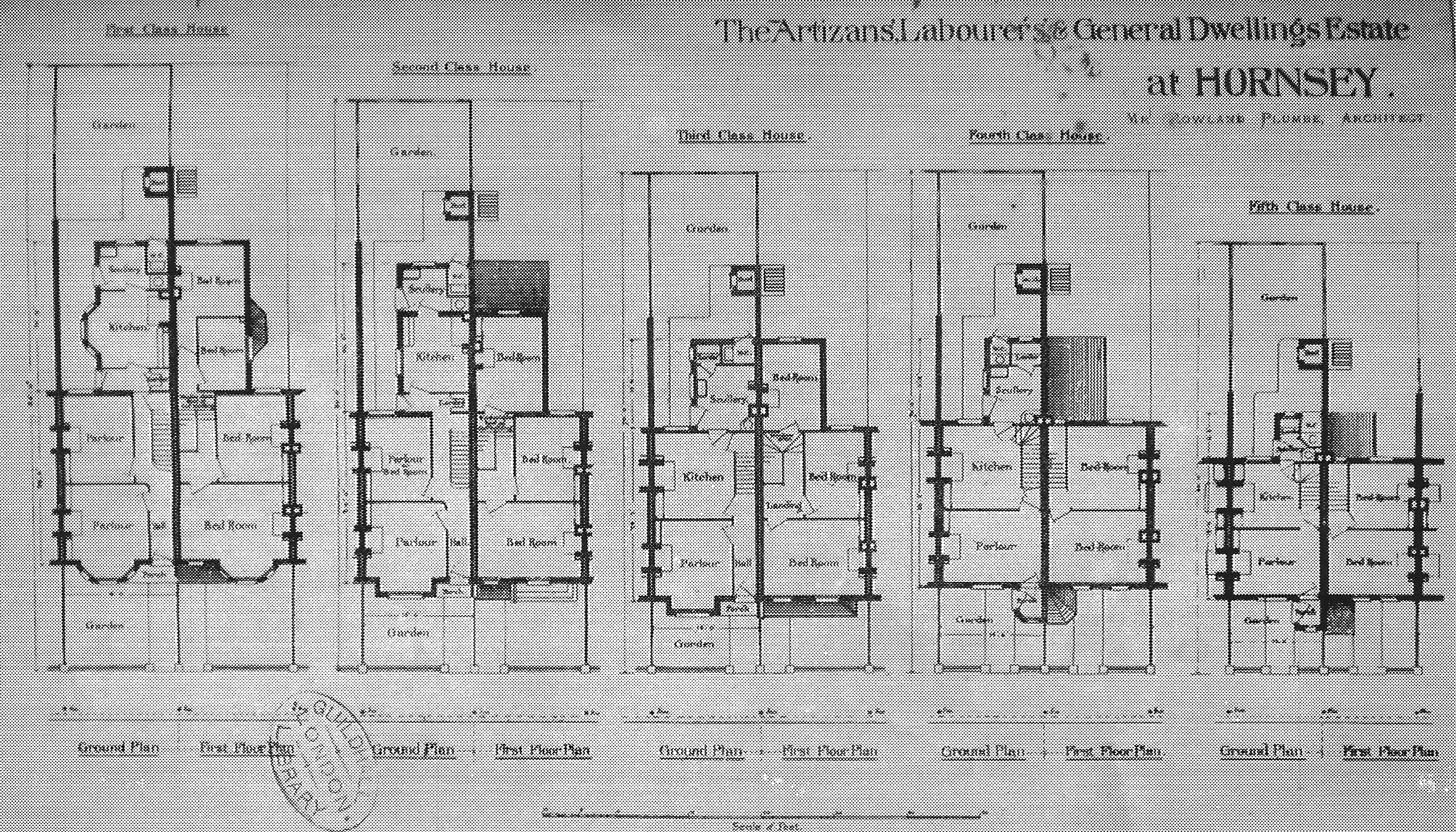
Floor plans for the five classes of house built in Noel Park

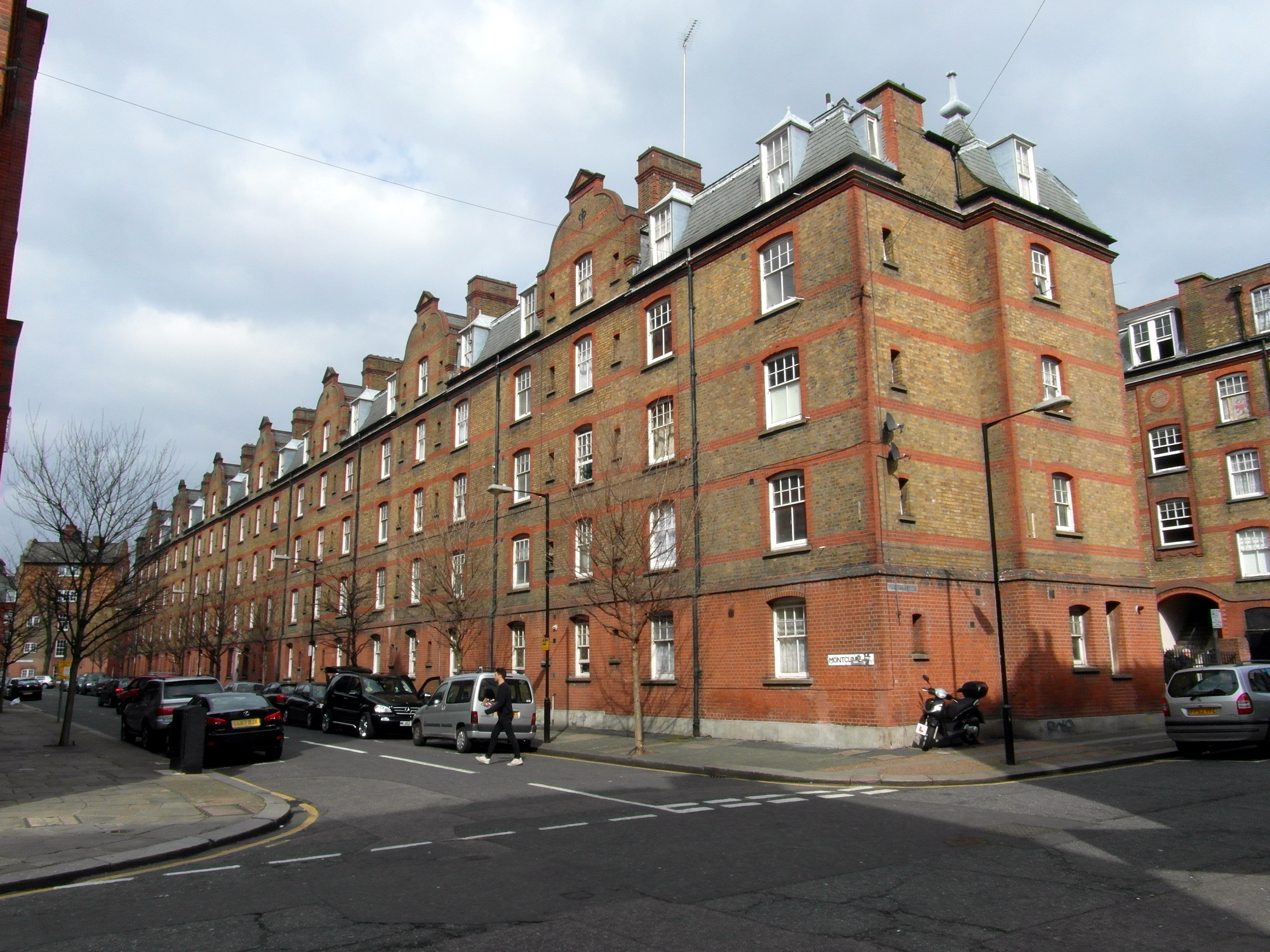
Montclare Street, Bethnal Green, completed in 1894

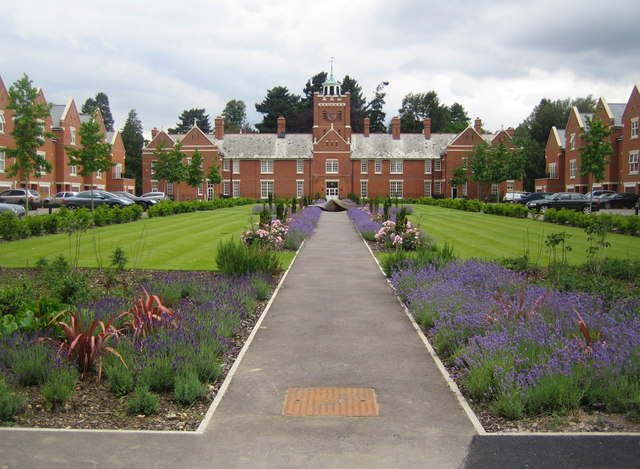
Napsbury Hospital, London Colney, completed in 1905

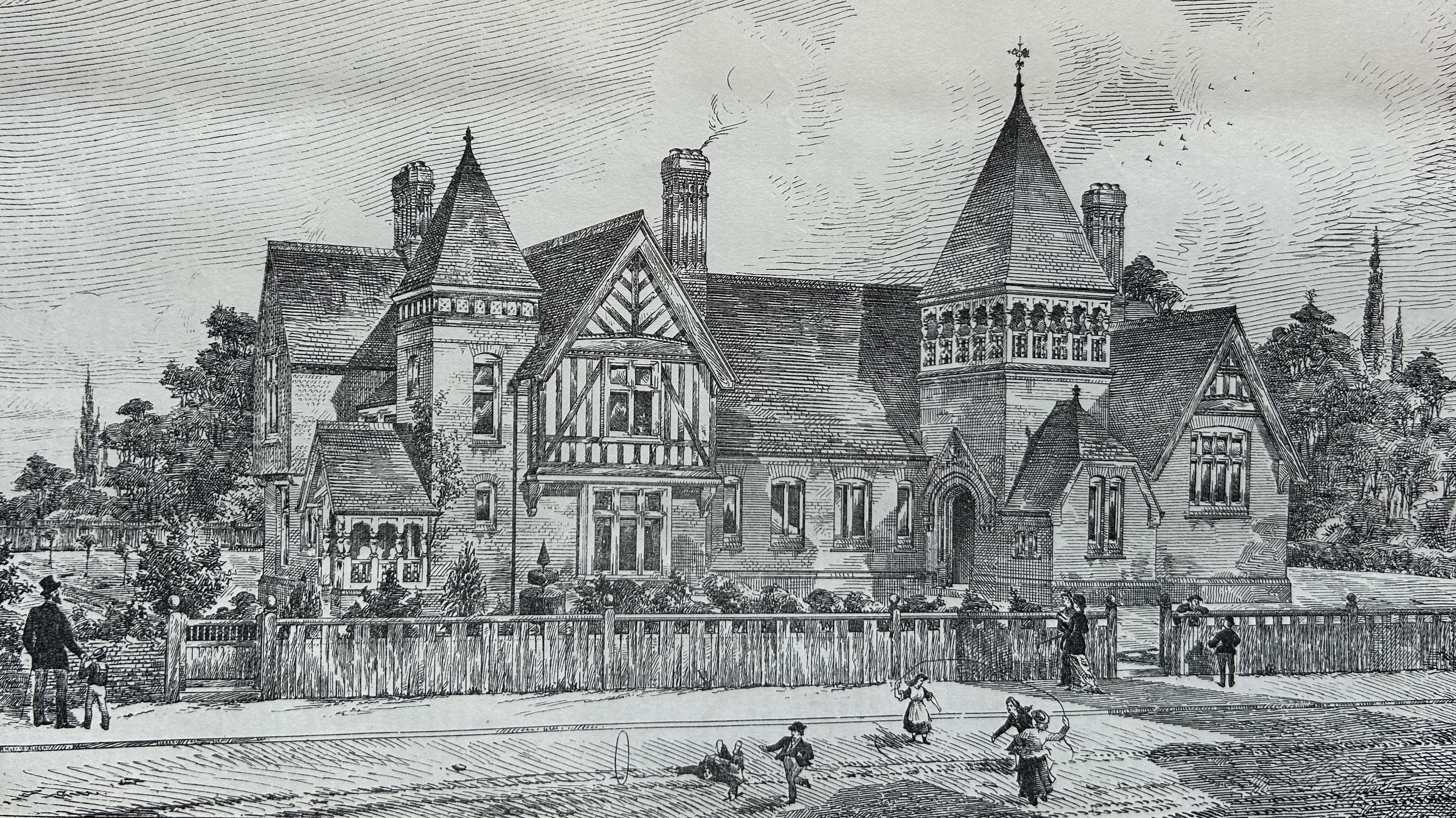
The Oatlands School for the Walton-on-Thames School Board

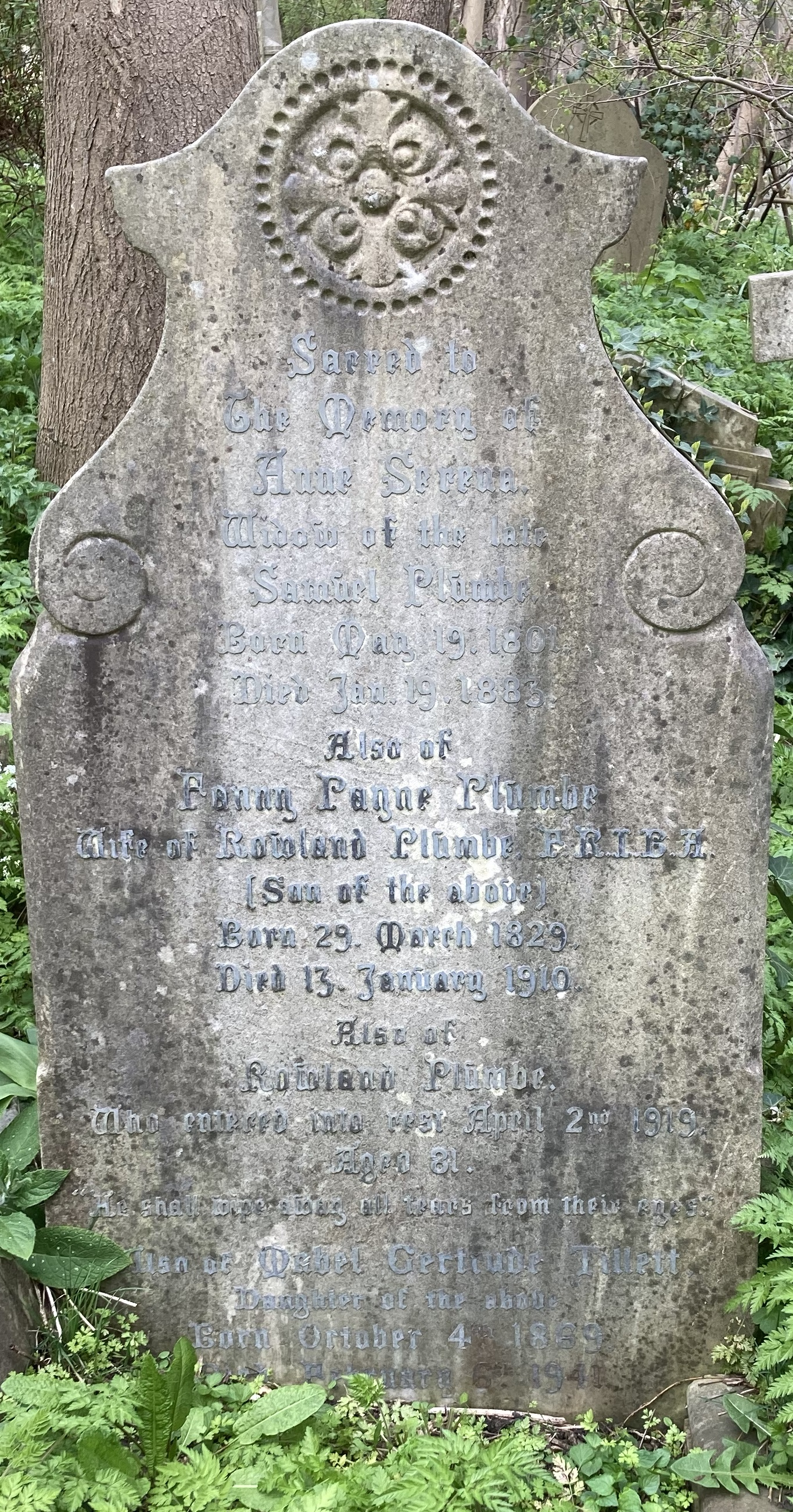
Family Grave of Rowland Plumbe in Highgate Cemetery

== Bibliography ==
- Welch, Caroline (2006). Noel Park: A Social and Architectural History. London: Haringey Council Libraries, Archives & Museum Services. OCLC 123373636.
