= Shenley =

Village in Hertfordshire, England

Coordinates: 51.692°N 0.282°W

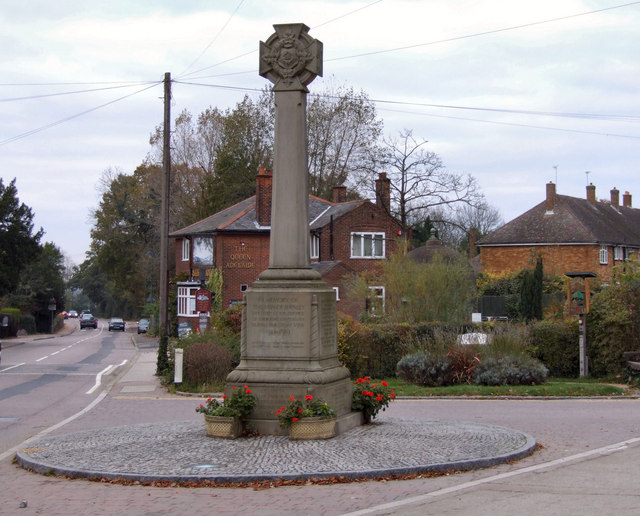
- Shenley War Memorial

- Location within Hertfordshire
- Population: 5,390 2021 Census
- OS grid reference: TL187007
- District: Hertsmere
- Shire county: Hertfordshire
- Region: East
- Country: England
- Sovereign state: United Kingdom
- Post town: RADLETT
- Postcode district: WD7
- Dialling code: 01923
- Police: Hertfordshire
- Fire: Hertfordshire
- Ambulance: East of England
- UK Parliament: Hertsmere

Shenley is a village and civil parish in Hertfordshire, England, between Barnet and St Albans. The village is located 14 miles from Central London. As of 2021, the population of the parish was 5,390; however, the parish stretches far beyond the village itself; it is the largest parish in Hertsmere and is very rural, including hamlets and farming settlements such as Dancers Hill, Green Street, Kitts End, Ridge, Saffron Green, Shenleybury, and the largest other settlement, South Mimms.

== History ==
The history of Shenley stretches back a thousand years or more – it is mentioned in the Domesday Book of 1086. The name Shenley is based on the Anglo-Saxon Scenlai, Scenlei or Senlai, which means ‘fair or bright clearing or wood’. In the early Middle Ages, southwest Hertfordshire was heavily wooded, with isolated farmsteads or hamlets in forest clearings. Shenley would have been one of these settlements.

The medieval road from London to St Albans ran through the village, a major route to the Midlands. In 1268, a charter granted the right to hold a market in Shenley on Mondays and a fair on St Botolph's Day. By the 14th century, Shenley was considered to be a convenient parish for a country estate, being within reasonable reach of London. Its pure air, after the smoke and fog of the city made it a healthy place to live. The present village of Shenley apparently grew to accommodate the families of those providing a variety of services for the country estates of the gentry. Parish registers, dating back to 1657, include service occupations such as coachmen, bailiffs, bakers and labourers. Others worked in agriculture, as cattle drovers, shepherds and millers. Craftsmen in Shenley included tailors, weavers, shoemakers, cordwainers, brick-makers, blacksmiths and carpenters. Tiles and bricks were made in the area, due to the abundance of suitable clay.

Although many of Shenley's population were involved in humble occupations, the village was considered quite prosperous. In 1754 the village was assessed to be the sixteenth highest parish in the county (excluding the areas around St Albans) and by 1823, the rateable value of the parish was £9,796.00, with only nine other parishes in the county rating higher.

During the First World War, part of the land at Porters was requisitioned and used as an aerodrome. Mr Raphael sold the land to Middlesex County Council in 1924 and, several years later, Shenley Hospital was built on the land. The design was such that as many of the existing buildings as possible were incorporated, including the mansion, the walled garden, stables and coach houses. King George V and Queen Mary officially opened the hospital in 1934.

Shenley Hospital remained in service for over 60 years. It was then sold off to property developers for housing. It was not without some trepidation that some of the old-time residents viewed what had been described as an annex to Shenley but what, in reality, would more than double the number of residences in the village. However, the development took place, but as well as houses, Shenley Park was developed and maintained for the enjoyment of the whole village. These included preserving the orchard and spinney for pleasant walks and recreation, landscaping the walled garden, which is often open to the public and hosts a number of events throughout the year, redeveloping the tennis courts to a high standard, and, more recently, the introduction of a teashop and play area.

Shenley is also home to the training grounds of football clubs Watford (opened in 1999) and Arsenal (opened in 2000).

Manor Lodge School, an independent primary school for children aged 4–11, is located in the village. The school is based in a grade II listed building formerly known as Shenley Lodge which appeared as the "Cat Lady"'s house in Stanley Kubrick's A Clockwork Orange. It was also home to Second World War double agent Eddie Chapman.

Shenley is also home to the Shenley Cricket Centre, which plays host to women's and U19 international matches in the summer. At the heart of the centre is the 19th-century pavilion, originally designed by W. G. Grace. The cricketing theme runs through many of the road names on the Porters Park housing estate.

Shenley Hall is a house built in the 19th century, which benefited from additions by Sir Edwin Lutyens in 1914.

The burial place of the English Baroque architect Nicholas Hawksmoor (1661–1736) lies in St Botolph's graveyard, Shenleybury, Shenley. The church was deconsecrated in 1972 and the grave is now on private land. St Botolph's is also the final resting place of Formula One champion Graham Hill, who lived in Shenley during the 1970s.

The parish church of Shenley is now St Martin's Shenley, built in 1841.

== Landmarks ==
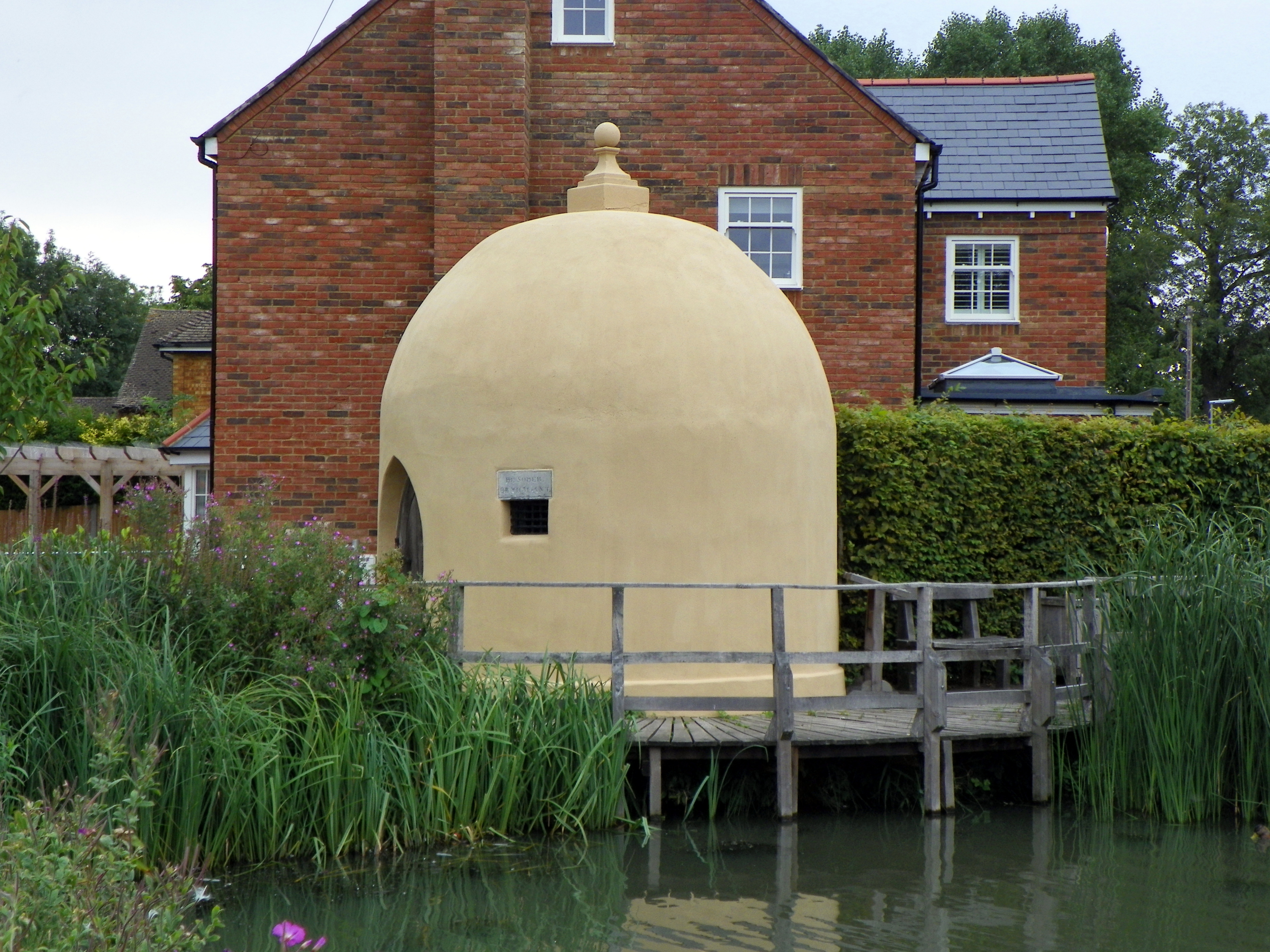
The Cage on the Pond is a village lock-up dating from the 18th century.

=== The Cage on the Pond ===
The Cage on London Road dates from the 18th century and was the village lock-up, originally for prisoners awaiting trial in St Albans or Chipping Barnet. A set of stocks stood nearby at one time. It is a small, circular building with a domed top, surmounted by a ball finial. A pointed timber plank door has strap hinges and there are two small, iron barred openings with stone tablets above bearing the inscription "DO WELL. AND FEAR NOT." on one and "BE SOBER. BE VIGILANT." on the other. Also inscribed is "1810" which is the date it was repaired after a tree grew through the roof. It is a Grade II listed building.

=== St Botolph's Church ===
The medieval parish church for Shenley was three-quarters of a mile (1.2 km) to the north of the village. It was completely rebuilt in 1424 after a bequest by Maud Francis, Countess of Salisbury. In 1753, the church was re-roofed and the chancel was demolished, while the tower had to be demolished in 1925. The church was made redundant in 1972 and is now a private residence. It is a Grade II* listed building.

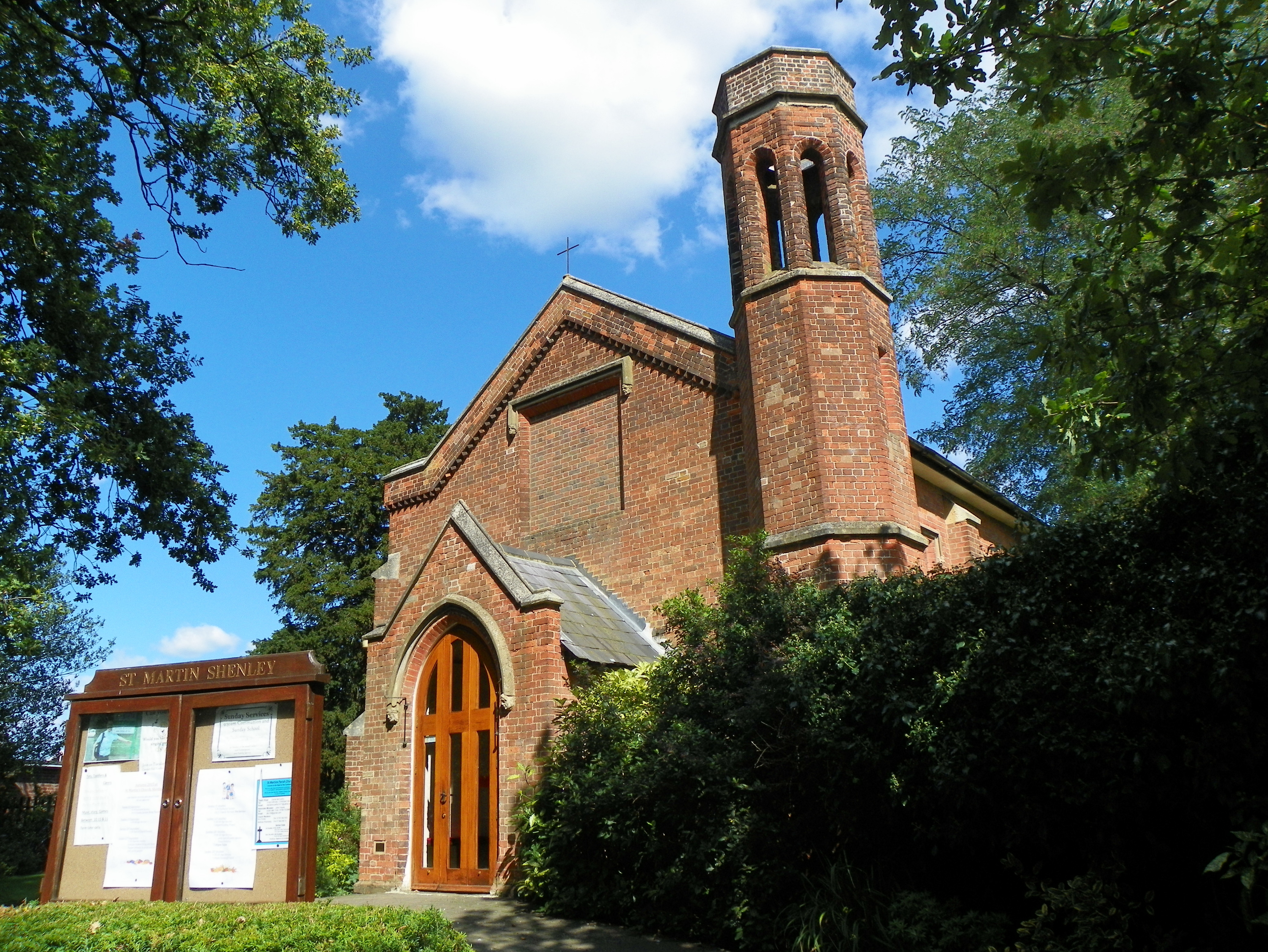
St Martin's Church, Shenley

=== St Martin's Church ===
St Martin's Shenley is the Church of England parish church and was built in brick in 1841 as a chapel of ease for St Botolph's, Designed by S. Staples, it has a small chancel and a west gallery, now occupied by a later organ. The Arms of George III and some stained glass were brought here from the old church when closed in 1972. It is a Grade II listed building.

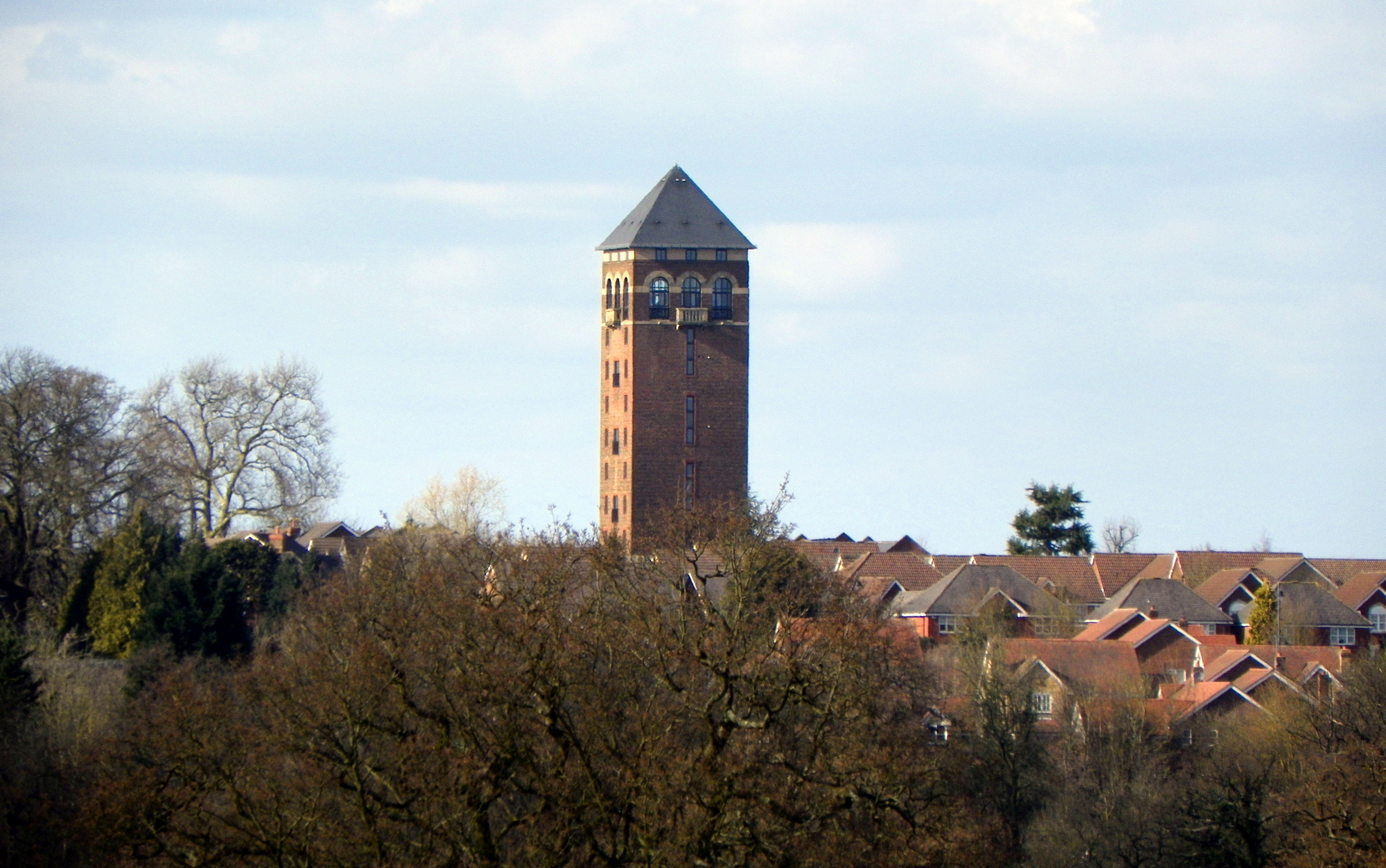
Shenley Water Tower

=== War Memorial ===
Built in the centre of the village, the war memorial was unveiled in July 1920 to commemorate the 36 Shenley men who died in the First World War. The sculptor was Thomas J. Clapperton. A further 19 names were added for those who died in the Second World War.

=== Shenley Water Tower ===
Built in the Italianate style in 1932 by John Laing & Co to serve as a water tower for Shenley Mental Hospital. The hospital closed in 1998 and while much of the site was demolished, the tower was retained and converted to residential flats.

== Demographics ==
In 2011, the population was 4,474. This rose to 5,390 in 2021, an increase of 20.47% in a decade.

A plurality of the population is Christian, similar to the general trend in England and Wales. However, Shenley has an unusually high Jewish population, in keeping with neighbouring settlements in southwestern Hertfordshire.

Area	All people	Christian (%)	Buddhist (%)	Hindu (%)	Jewish (%)	Muslim (%)	Sikh (%)	Other (%)	No religion (%)	Not stated (%)
England and Wales	56,490,048	46.3	0.5	1.8	0.5	6.7	0.9	0.6	36.7	6.0
Shenley	5,390	40.28	0.65	2.56	21.19	2.02	0.39	0.54	25.33	7.07
