= List of burials at Kensal Green Cemetery =

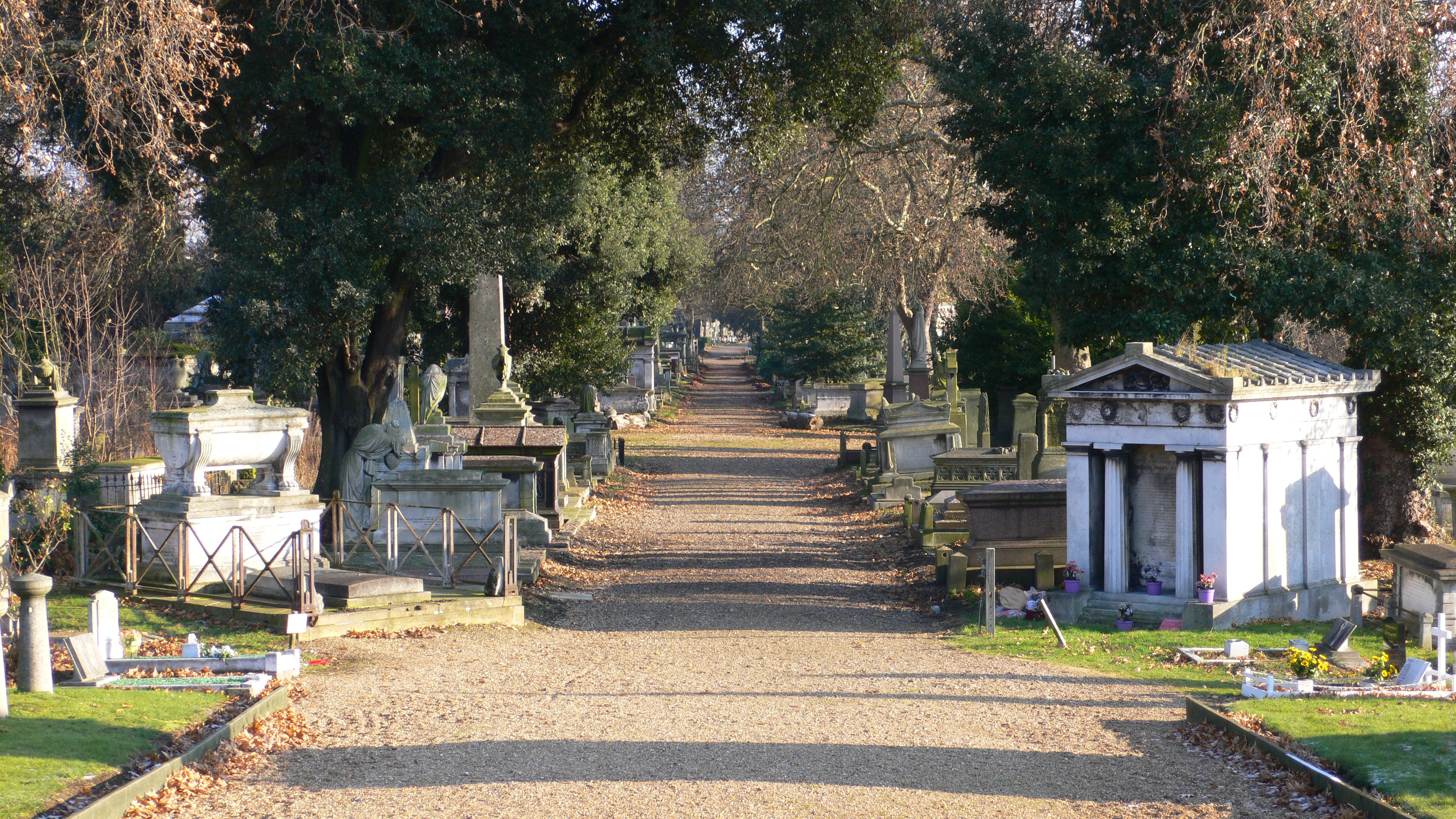
Kensal Green Cemetery view

This is an incomplete list of burials at Kensal Green Cemetery by occupation.

== Architects ==
- Thomas Allom (1804–1872)
- David Brandon (1813–1897)
- William Burn (1789–1870)
- Decimus Burton FRS (1800–1881)
- John Murray Easton (1889–1975)
- John Gibson (1817–1892)
- John Goldicutt (1793–1842)
- Joseph Henry Good (1775–1857)
- Francis Goodwin (1784–1835)
- Charles Ridson Gribble (1835–1896)
- Philip Hardwick (1792–1880)
- Philip Charles Hardwick (1822–1892)
- Owen Jones (1809–1874)
- Sir John Kelk, 1st Baronet (1816–1886)
- Henry Edward Kendall (1776–1875)
- Thomas Hayter Lewis (1818–1898)
- Alexander Marshall Peebles (1837–1891)
- William Scamp (1801–1872)
- John Shaw, Jr. (1803–1870)
- John Tarring (1805–1875)
- William Wood Deane (1825–1873)

== Art ==
- Lady Laura Theresa Alma-Tadema (1852–1909)
- Jonathon St. John Aubin (1928–1986)
- Gaetano Stefano Bartolozzi (1757–1821)
- William Behnes (1795–1864)
- Richard Parkes Bonington (1802–1828)
- Henry Alexander Bowler (1824–1903)
- George Price Boyce (1826–1897)
- Thomas Brigstocke (1809–1881)
- Augustus Wall Callcott (1779–1844)
- Philip Hermogenes Calderon (1833–1898)
- Thomas Campbell (1790–1858)
- John Edward Carew (1785–1868)
- Hugh Carter (1837–1903)
- Sir Caspar Purdon Clarke CIE (1846–1911)
- Ann Birch Cockings (c. 1766–1844)
- George Vicat Cole (1833–1893)
- Ernest Crofts (1847–1911)
- Eyre Crowe (1824–1910)
- George Cruikshank (1792–1878) (remains transferred to St. Paul's Cathedral in 1878)
- Allan Cunningham (1784–1842)
- Thomas Daniell (1749–1840)
- William Daniell (1769–1837)
- John Scarlett Davis (1804–1844)
- Lowes Cato Dickinson (1819–1908)
- Joseph Durham (1814–1877)
- Sir Charles Lock Eastlake (1793–1865)
- Charles Locke Eastlake (1836–1906)
- Henri Jean-Baptiste Victoire Fradelle (1778–1865)
- William Powell Frith (1819–1909)
- Andrew Geddes (1783–1844)
- Carlo Giuliano (c. 1831–1895)
- Frederick Goulding (1842–1909)
- Fairlie Harmer (Lady Harberton) (1876–1945)
- Edwin Hayes (1819–1904)
- John Hollins (1798–1855)
- James Holworthy (c. 1796–1841)
- Humphrey Hopper (1833–1866)
- John Calcott Horsley (1817–1903)
- John Adams Houston (1812–1864)
- Anna Brownell Jameson (1794–1860)
- Frederick William Keyl (1823–1871)
- John Leech (1817–1864)
- Charles Robert Leslie (1794–1859)
- John Graham Lough (1806–1876)
- John Lucas (1807–1874)
- Daniel Maclise (1806–1870)
- William Calder Marshall (1813–1894)
- Wallis McKay (1802–1907)
- William Mulready (1776–1863)
- John Trivett Nettleship (1841–1902)
- John Phillip (1817–1867)
- Robert Phillips (1810–1881)
- Edward Gustavus Physick (1802–1875)
- Ada Alice Pullen (Dorothy Dene) (1859–1899)
- François Théodore Rochard (c. 1804–1857), younger brother of Simon Jacques Rochard
- William Salter (1804–1875)
- Edward Scriven (1775–1841)
- Robert William Sievier (1794–1865)
- François Simonau (1783–1859)]
- Robert Smirke (1752–1845)
- Emma Soyer (1813–1842)
- Thomas Stewardson (1781–1859)
- William Strang (1859–1921)
- Frederick Edward Swain (1871–1944)
- Sir John Tenniel (1820–1914)
- John Ternouth (c. 1796–1848)
- Joseph Theakston (1772–1842)
- John Thompson (1785–1866)
- Charles Vacher (1818–1883)
- John Varley (1778–1842)
- James Ward (1769–1859)
- Leslie Ward ('Spy') (1851–1922)
- John William Waterhouse (1849–1917)
- Henry Weekes (1807–1877)

== Business ==
- Joshua Bates (1788–1864)
- Archibald Blane (1788–1852)
- John Lewis Bonhote (c. 1805–1867)
- Sir Ernest Joseph Cassel GCB GCMG GCVO (1852–1921)
- Thomas de la Rue (1793–1866)
- Thomas Liversedge Fish (1782–1861)
- Sir Francis Freeling (1764–1836)
- John Gordon (1802–1840)
- Carl Joachim Hambro, 1st Baron Hambro (1807–1877)
- Thomas Hamlet (1770–1853)
- Sir Henry Harben (1823–1911)
- Joseph Hudson, tobacconist (1778–1854)
- John Frederick Andrew Huth (1777–1864)
- Sir Andrew Lusk (1810–1909)
- Arnaud Paige Whyte (1815–1897)
- John Horsley Palmer (1779–1858) Governor of the Bank of England
- Sir John Dean Paul, 1st Baronet (1775–1852)
- Sir John Dean Paul, 2nd Baronet (1802–1868)
- Andrew Pears (1766–1845), inventor of Pears Soap
- Philip Cadell Peebles (1842–1895)
- Frederick Perkins (1780–1860)
- George Henry Robins (1778–1847)
- James Smith (died 1910)
- William Henry Smith (1792–1865)
- Dwarkanath Tagore (1794–1856)
- Joseph Charles Taylor, gave his name to Taylor's Port (died 1837)
- Gottlieb Augustus Treyer (1790–1869)
- Henry St George Tucker (1771–1851)
- John Aldred Twining (1770–1855)
- Richard Twining (1772–1857), FRS
- William Whiteley (1831–1907)

== Circuses ==
- William Batty (1802–1863)
- Charles Blondin (Jean-Francois Gravelet) (1824–1897)
- Alfred Cooke (1822–1854)
- Thomas Taplin Cooke (c. 1782–1866)
- William Cooke (1808–1886)
- Andrew Ducrow (1793–1842)
- Jean Pierre Ginnett (died 1861)

== Engineering ==
- Sir William Patrick Andrew (1806–1887)
- James Lloyd Ashbury (1834–1895)
- John Ashbury (1806–1866)
- Peter William Barlow (1809–1885)
- James Beatty (1820–1856)
- Richard Vicars Boyle CSI (1822–1908)
- John Braithwaite (1797–1870)
- Peter Brotherhood (1838–1902)
- William Duff Bruce (1839–1900)
- Isambard Kingdom Brunel (1806–1859)
- Sir Marc Isambard Brunel (1769–1849)
- George Bowden Burnell (1814–1868)
- George Burt (1816–1894)
- James Combe (c. 1806–1867)
- Thomas Russell Crampton (1816–1888)
- Thomas Barnabas Daft (1816–1878)
- James Dredge (1840–1906)
- John Edward Errington (1806–1862)
- Francis Giles (1787–1847)
- William Thomas Henley (1813–1882)
- Charles William Lancaster (1820–1878)
- Michael Lane (c. 1803–1868)
- William Leftwich (1770–1843)
- Joseph Locke (1805–1860)
- James MacAdam (c. 1818–1853)
- Sir James Nichol MacAdam (1786–1852)
- Joseph Manton (1766–1835)
- John Robinson McClean (1813–1873)
- David Napier (1790–1869)
- Charles Oldfield (1794–1855)
- Angier March Perkins (1799–1881)
- Jacob Perkins (1766–1849)
- John Shae Perring (1813–1869)
- Benjamin Piercy (1827–1888)
- William Alexander Provis (1792–1870)
- James Meadows Rendel (1799–1856)
- John Rennie the younger (1794–1874)
- Richard Roberts (1789–1864)
- Joseph D'Aguilar Samuda (1813–1885)
- Sir Carl William Siemens FRS (1823–1883)
- Jacob Snider (died 1866)
- Frederick Albert Winsor (1763–1830)

== Explorers ==
- Lady Jane Franklin (1791–1875)
- Admiral Sir Edward Augustus Inglefield KCB FRS (1820–1894)
- John Lander (1807–1839)
- Admiral Richard Charles Mayne CB (1835–1892)
- Vice Admiral Sir Robert McClure CB (1807–1873)
- Robert McCormick (1800–1890)
- Admiral Sir John Ross CB (1777–1856)
- Admiral Henry John Rous (1795–1877)
- John McDouall Stuart (1815–1866)

== Funerals ==
- William Banting (1826–1901)
- William Westbrook Banting (1857–1932)
- Rupert Brindley (c. 1791–1847)
- Thomas Dowbiggin (died 1854)
- William Holland (1779–1856)
- Edward Manuel Lander (1836–1910)
- Richard Maile (died 1850)
- John Nodes (died 1895)

== Legal ==
- Thomas James Arnold (c. 1804–1877)
- George Parker Bidder, Jr. (1836–1896)
- Peter Burrowes (1751–1841)
- George Frederick Carden (1798–1874)
- Richard Carlile (1790–1843)
- Sir Alexander Cockburn GCB (1802–1880)
- Sir Cresswell Cresswell (1794–1863)
- Dadoba Dewajee (died 1861) [often given as "Daboda"]
- Sir George Farrant (c. 1770–1844)
- James Harmer (1777-1853)
- Sir Henry Hawkins, 1st Baron Brampton (1817–1907)
- Sir Henry Singer Keating (1804–1888)
- Sir Robert Lush (1807–1881)
- Sir Henry Manisty (1808–1890)
- Sir William Maule KC (1788–1858)
- Sir Richard Mayne KCB (1786–1868)
- Edward Molyneux (1798–1864)
- Robert Pashley (1805–1859)
- Samuel Plank (1777–1840)
- Sir George Rose FRS (1782–1873)
- Benjamin Rotch (1794–1854)
- James Russell (1790–1861)
- Sir Edward Ryan FRS (1793–1875)
- William Shaen (1820–1887)
- Charles Shaw-Lefevre, 1st Viscount Eversley GCB (1794–1888)
- Edward Smirke (1795–1875)
- Sir Montague Edward Smith (1808–1891)
- Sir James Fitzjames Stephen KCSI (1829–1894)
- Nicholas Conyngham Tindal (1776–1846)

== Medicine ==
- Dr. James Barry (c.1789–1865)
- Sir William Beatty FRS MD (1773–1842)
- Archibald Billing (1791–1881)
- John Bostock (1773–1846)
- Richard Bright (1789–1858)
- William Brinton (1823–1867)
- Sir Anthony Carlisle (1768–1840)
- Soorjo Coomar Goodeve Chuckerbutty (1826–1874)
- Richard Clewin Griffith (1791–1881)
- Dr. Albert Isaiah Coffin (1791–1866), Medical Botanist
- Robert Collum (1806–1900),
- Samuel Cooper (1780–1848)
- William Coulson (1802–1877)
- John Croft (1833–1905)
- George Darling (c. 1782–1862)
- Robert Druitt (1814–1883)
- Sir George Duncan Gibb (1821–1876), Canadian doctor
- John Elliotson (1791–1868)
- George Napoleon Epps (1815–1874)
- John Epps (1805–1869)
- Arthur Farre (1811–1887)
- Sir John William Fisher (1788–1876)
- Samuel Jones Gee (1839–1911)
- Dr. James Manby Gully (1808–1883)
- Leonard Guthrie (1858–1918)
- Charles Robert Bell Keetley (1848–1909)
- Sir William Knighton GCH (1776–1836)
- Robert Lee (1793–1877)
- Sir George William Lefevre (1798–1846)
- Sir Charles Locock (1799–1875)
- John St. John Long (1798–1834)
- James Luke (1799–1881)
- Sir William MacCormac KCB KCVO (1836–1901)
- Sir James Ranald Martin (1793–1874)
- Sir James McGrigor KCB FRS (1771–1858)
- Sir William McKenzie (1811–1895)
- James Morison (1770–1840)
- Sir James Mouat VC KCB (1815–1899)
- George Pilcher (1801–1855)
- Dr. Frederic Hervey Foster Quin (1799–1878)
- Edward Rigby (1804–1860)
- Frederick Salmon (1795–1868), founder of St Mark's Hospital
- Sir Charles Scudamore (1779–1849)
- Edward Cator Seaton (1815–1880)
- Robert Bentley Todd (1809–1860)
- Rear Admiral Henry Dundas Trotter (1802–1859)
- Dr. David Uwins (c. 1780–1837)
- Robert Wade (1798–1872)

== Military ==
- Col. Frederick Robinson Aikman VC (1828–1888)
- Gen. Sir Richard Airey, 1st Baron Airey GCB (1803–1881)
- Gen. Sir John Aitchison GCB (1789–1875)
- Maj Gen. George Anson CB (1797–1857)
- Sir George Bell KCB (1794–1877)
- Sir Henry John William Bentinck KCB (1796–1878)
- Gen. Sir Michael Anthony Shrapnel Biddulph GCB (1823–1904)
- Col. Guy Huddlesdon Boisragon VC (1864–1931)
- Gen. Sir William Casement (1780–1844)
- Gen. Christopher Tilson Chowne (1771–1834)
- Adm. Sir George Cockburn, 10th Baronet GCB FRS (1772–1853)
- Gen. Sir Charles Colville GCB GCH (1770–1843)
- Sir Alexander Cunningham KCIE CSI (1814–1893)
- Admiral Henry Collins Deacon (1788–1869)
- Gen. Sir Collingwood Dickson VC GCB (1817–1904)
- Gen. Sir Moore Disney KCB (1766–1846)
- Maj Gen Matthew Charles Dixon VC CB (1821–1905)
- Gen. Sir Charles W.H. Douglas GCB (1850-1914)
- Charles Milne Cholmeley Dowling (died 1920)
- James Ekin (1829–1896)
- General Robert Ellice (1784–1856)
- General Sir George de Lacy Evans GCB (1787–1870)
- Vice Adml. Charles Joseph Frederick Ewart CB (1816–1884)
- Admiral Sir Arthur Fanshawe KCB (1794–1864)
- Sir Ronald Crauford Ferguson (1773–1841)
- Sir Archibald Galloway KCB (1779-1850)
- Gen. Isaac Gascoyne (1763–1841)
- Gen. Sir Walter Raleigh Gilbert, Bt GCB (1785–1853)
- Surgeon-General Huntly George Gordon (1821–1888)
- Lt. Col. Gideon Gorrequer (c. 1780–1841)
- Gen. Sir Hugh Henry Gough VC GCB (1833–1899)
- Gen. Sir Lewis Grant KCH (1778–1852)
- Admiral Sir Edward Hamilton, 1st Baronet KCB (1772–1851)
- Sir George Head (1782–1855)
- Major Gen. Sir John Hills FRS KCB (1832–1902)
- Maj Gen Sir Neville Reginald Howse VC KCB KCMG (1863–1930)
- Leonard Henry Lloyd Irby (1836–1905)
- Sir James Kempt GCB GCH (1776–1854)
- György Kmety (Ismail Pasha) (1813–1869)
- Major Gen. Sir Owen Edward Pennefather Lloyd VC KCB (1854–1941)
- Maj. Gen. David Limond CB (1831–1895)
- Gen. Sir William Lumley GCB (1769–1850)
- Gen. Sir James Law Lushington GCB (1779–1859)
- Capt. John Grant Malcolmson VC MVO (1835–1902)
- Admiral Sir Thomas Byam Martin GCB (1773–1854)
- Gen. Sir George Murray KCB (1772–1846)
- Vice Admiral James Noble (1779–1851)
- Admiral Sir Robert Walter Otway Bt GCB (1770–1846)
- Sir Charles William Pasley KCB FRS (1780–1861)
- Gen. Sir George Paty KCB KH (1788–1868)
- Gen. Sir Warren Marmaduke Peacocke KCH (1766–1849)
- Adm. Sir Henry Prescott GCB (1783–1874)
- Gen. Sir Dighton MacNaughton Probyn VC GCB GCSI GCVO ISO (1833–1924)
- Captain Charles Spencer Ricketts (1788–1867)
- Adm. Sir Robert Spencer Robinson KCB FRS (1809–1889)
- Lt Col Sir Charles Rowan KCB (1783–1852)
- Rear-Admiral Ion Tower DSC SGM (1889-1940)
- Admiral Sir Richard Edward Tracey KCB (1837–1907)
- Gen. Sir Walter Tremenheere KH (1761–1855)
- Major Gen. William Spottiswoode Trevor VC (1831–1907)
- Major-Gen. Marcus Antonius Waters (1794–1868)
- Capt. George Alexander Waters (c1820–1903)
- Lt-Col. Sir Henry Vassall Webster (1792–1847)
- Major Sir John Christopher Willoughby, 5th Baronet DSO (1859-1918)
- Field Marshal Sir Alexander Woodford GCB GCMG (1782–1870)
- Gen. Edward Buckley Wynyard, CB (1788–1864)
- Captain Charles Codrington Forsyth, CB (c. 1810 - 1873)

== Music ==
- Thomas Massa Alsager (1779–1846)
- William Ayrton (1777–1858)
- Michael William Balfe (1808–1870)
- Julius Benedict (1804–1885)
- James Chapman Bishop (1783–1854)
- George Augustus Polgreen Bridgetower (1782–1860)
- John Leman Brownsmith (1809–1866).
- Pete Burns (1959–2016)
- William Chappell (1809–1888)
- John Balsir Chatterton (1804–1871)
- Charles Lukey Collard (died 1891), piano manufacturer
- Thomas Simpson Cooke (1782–1848)
- Charles Coote (1807–1879), composer
- Sir Michael Andrew Agnellus Costa (1808–1884)
- Sir William George Cusins (1833–1893)
- Charles D'Albert (1809–1886), composer
- "Boots" (Philimore Gordon) Davidson (c. 1928–1993)
- Angelo Adolpho Ferrari (1807–1870)
- Henry John Gauntlett (1805–1876)
- Sir John Goss (1800–1880)
- John Liptrot Hatton (1809–1886)
- William Horsley (1774–1858)
- John Pyke Hullah (1812–1884)
- Robert Lindley (1776–1855)
- George Linley (1798–1865)
- Donald Mackay (died 1894)
- James Henry Mapleson (1802–1868)
- George Richard Metzler (1797–1867), dealer in instruments and publisher of music
- Nicolas Mori (1796–1839)
- George Perry (1793–1862)
- Philip Cipriani Hambly Potter (1792–1871)
- Joseph Richardson (c. 1790–1855)
- Sir Landon Ronald (1873–1938)
- Henry Russell (1812–1900)
- George Thomas Smart (1776–1867)
- Charles Edward Stephens (1821–1882)
- Steve Peregrine Took (né Porter) (1948–1980)
- William Vincent Wallace (1812–1865)
- Henry Wylde (1822–1890)

== Photography ==
- Frederick Scott Archer (1814–1858)
- Alexander Bassano (1829–1913)
- William Bedford (1846–1893), brother of Francis and son of Francis Octavius Bedford
- (Robert) Vernon Heath (1820–1895)
- Oscar Rejlander (1813–1875)
- Charles Thurston Thompson (1816–1868), son of John Thompson

== Politics ==
- Charles Arbuthnot (1767–1850)
- William Atherton (1806–1864)
- Sir Alfred Billson (1839-1907)
- Sir Samuel George Bonham Bt KCB (1803–1863)
- Robert Bourke, Baron Connemara GCIE (1827–1902)
- Sir George Bowen GCMG (1821–1899)
- Charles Buller (1806–1848)
- Lord Thomas Cecil (1797–1873)
- Montagu William Lowry Corry, Baron Rowton KCVO CB (1838–1903)
- Sir Charles Wentworth Dilke (1843–1911)
- Thomas Slingsby Duncombe (1796–1861)
- Sir Peter Hesketh-Fleetwood (1801–1866)
- Sir John Hawley Glover GCMG (1829–1885)
- Sir Charles Edward Grey GCH (1785–1865)
- George David Harris (1827–1902)
- Sir Edmund Walker Head Bt KCB (1805–1868)
- Henry Hetherington (1792–1849)
- John Cam Hobhouse, 1st Baron Broughton GCB PC FRS (1786–1869)
- Joseph Hume PC (1777–1855)
- Sir George de Hochepied Larpent Bt (1786–1855)
- Sir Richard Graves MacDonnell KCMG CB (1814–1881)
- Sir John Malcolm KCB (1769–1833)
- Sir William Molesworth, Bt (1810–1855)
- Lord Robert Montagu PC (1825–1902)
- John Lothrop Motley (1814–1877)
- Sir Patrick O'Brien, 2nd Baronet (1823–1895)
- Feargus O'Connor (1794–1855)
- Sir William Gore Ouseley (1797–1866)
- Sir Arthur Paget GCB (1771–1840)
- Winthrop Mackworth Praed (1802–1839)
- Charles Ross (1799–1860)
- Charles Seale-Hayne (1833–1903)
- John Benjamin Smith (1794–1879)
- David Ochterlony Dyce Sombre (1808–1851)
- Sir James Stephen PC KCB (1789–1859)
- Charles Thompson Ritchie, 1st Lord Ritchie of Dundee) (1838–1906)
- Thomas Tooke (1774–1858)
- Charles Richard Vaughan (1775–1849)
- Charles Pelham Villiers (1802–1898)
- William Williams (1788–1865)

== Religion ==
- William Henry Brookfield (1809–1874)
- Rev. Adam Clarke (died 1886)
- Dr. John Clifford CH (1836–1923)
- John Cumming (1807–1881)
- Rev. Edward Chichester, 4th Marquess of Donegall (1799–1889)
- Rev. Sir Henry Robert Dukinfield, Bt (1791–1858)
- Robert Fellowes (1770–1847)
- James Fleming (1830–1908)
- Rt. Rev. Renn Hampden (1793-1868)
- Rev. Ridley Haim Herschell (1807–1864)
- Rev. David King (1806–1883)
- Robert William Mackay (1803–1882)
- Rt. Rev. Thomas Musgrave (1778–1860)
- Samuel Rickards (1796–1865)
- Rev. Arthur Robins (1834–1899)
- Rev. George Shapcott (1848–1935)
- James Smirnove (1756–1840)
- Rev. Henry Stebbing FRS (1799–1883)
- Rt Rev. Charles James Stewart (1775–1839)
- Rt. Rev. Thomas Turton (1780–1864)

== Royalty and aristocracy ==
- Mary Jane Adams, servant to Queens Victoria and Alexandra (1845–1921)
- Frances Bowles (née Temple), sister of Lord Palmerston (c. 1786–1838)
- George John Browne, 3rd Marquess of Sligo (1820–1896)
- Henry Ulick Browne, 5th Marquess of Sligo (1831–1913)
- Howe Peter Browne, 2nd Marquess of Sligo KP (1788–1845)
- Lady Anne Isabella Noel Byron (1792–1860)
- George William Frederick Charles, Duke of Cambridge (1819–1904)
- Marigold Frances Churchill (1918–1921), daughter of Sir Winston Churchill (body removed to St Martin's Church, Bladon, Oxfordshire)
- Sir George Couper Bt (1788–1861)
- John Constantine De Courcy, 29th Baron Kingsale (1827–1865), Premier Baron of Ireland
- Jind Kaur (1817–1863), wife of Ranjit Singh, mother of deposed maharaja Duleep Singh
- Percy Sholto Douglas, 10th Marquess of Queensberry (1868–1920), brother of 'Bosie'
- Henry Weysford Charles Hastings (4th Marquess of Hastings) (1842–1868)
- Duchess of Inverness (Cecilia Letitia Underwood) (1793–1873), morganatic wife of the Duke of Sussex
- Victoria Paget, god-daughter of Queen Victoria (1848–1859)
- Baron Georg Friedrich Wilhelm von Pfeilitzer genannt Franck, Pour Le Mérite (1767–1853)
- William Pole-Tylney-Long-Wellesley, 4th Earl of Mornington (1788–1857)
- John Ponsonby, 1st Viscount Ponsonby (1770–1855) Anglo-Irish diplomat.
- William John Cavendish Scott-Bentinck, 5th Duke of Portland (1800–1879)
- Edward Adolphus Seymour KG FRS, 11th Duke of Somerset (1775–1853)
- George Augustus Frederick Percy Sydney Smythe, 7th Viscount Strangford (1818–1857), nephew of the Duke of Wellington
- Lord Granville Charles Henry Somerset (1792–1848)
- Princess Sophia (1777–1848), fifth daughter of George III
- Augustus Frederick, Duke of Sussex (1773–1843), sixth son of George III
- Mary Ann Thurston, nurse to the children of Queen Victoria (1810–1896)

== Scientists ==
- Charles Babbage FRS (1791–1871)
- George Bishop (1785–1861)
- Rev. John Frederick Blake (1839–1906)
- William John Broderip FRS (1789–1859)
- Robert Brown FRS (1773–1858)
- Samuel Hawksley Burbury FRS (1831–1911)
- George Busk FRS (1807–1886)
- Sir Samuel Canning (1823–1908)
- Hugh Cuming (1791–1865)
- William Freeman Daniell (1818–1865)
- Henry De la Beche FRS (1796–1855)
- Edward John Dent (1790–1853)
- Alexander John Ellis FRS (1814–1890)
- Hugh Falconer FRS (1808–1865)
- David Forbes FRS (1828–1876)
- Sir Thomas Galloway FRS (1796–1851)
- John Hall Gladstone FRS (1827–1902)
- Joseph Glynn FRS (1799–1863)
- John Gould FRS (1804–1881)
- George Bellas Greenough FRS (1778–1855)
- Sir William Robert Grove FRS (1811–1896)
- Edmond Herbert Grove-Hills CMG CBE FRS (1864–1922)
- Frederick Gully (1833–1866)
- Thomas Hancock (1786–1865)
- Henry Noel Humphreys (1810–1879)
- William Kidd (1803–1867)
- Charles Konig (1774–1851)
- John Claudius Loudon (1783–1843)
- Robert James Mann (1817–1886)
- Robert Marnock (1800–1889)
- Augustus Matthieson (1831–1870)
- Frank McClean FRS (1837–1904)
- Rudolph Messel (1848–1920)
- John Morris (1810–1886)
- George Newport FRS (1803–1854)
- Sir Charles Thomas Newton KCB (1816–1886)
- Frederick Edward Pirkis (1835–1910)
- Baden Powell FRS (1796–1860)
- Joseph Sabine FRS (1770–1837)
- George James Symons FRS (1838–1900)
- Edward Troughton FRS (1753–1835)
- Edward Turner FRS (1798–1837)
- Nathaniel Wallich FRS (1786–1854)
- Friedrich Welwitsch (1806–1872)
- Sir Charles Wheatstone FRS (1802–1875)
- Frederick Albert Winsor (1763–1830)
- James Wyld (1812–1887)

== Sport ==
- Henry Charles Angelo the Younger (1780–1852)
- Patrick Bowes-Lyon, (1863–1946), tennis player
- James Cobbett (1804–1842), cricketer
- Edmund Carter Daniels (1857–1885)
- Percival May Davson (c. 1876–1959), fencer and tennis player
- Louis Charles de la Bourdonnais (1795–1840), chess master
- Robert David Diamond (1896–1972)
- Henry Jones (1831–1899), sport writer
- Roger Kynaston (1805–1874), cricketer
- Alexander McDonnell (1798–1835), chess master
- George Payne (1803–1878), racehorse owner
- James Prince (died 1886)
- Prince Dimitry Soltykoff (c. 1827–1903), racehorse owner
- Howard Staunton (1810–1874), chess master
- Allan Gibson Steel (1858–1914), cricketer
- Owen Swift (1814–1879), prize-fighter
- Major Walter Clopton Wingfield MVO (1833–1912), lawn tennis pioneer

== Theatre ==
- James Albery (1838–1889)
- James Robertson Anderson (1811–1895)
- Hezekiah Linthicum Bateman (1812–1875)
- Henry Roxby Beverley (1790–1863)
- Henry Roxby Beverley (c. 1814–1889)
- John Boaden (1762–1839)
- Arthur Bourchier (1863–1927)
- Anna Maria Bradshaw (1801–1862)
- John Braham (1774–1856)
- Agnes Butterfield (Kitty Melrose) (1883–1912)
- Oscar Byrn (1795–1867)
- Ada Cavendish (Marshal) (1839–1895)
- George Claremont (1846–1919)
- "Handsome" Harry Clifton (c. 1826–1872)
- Samuel Collins (Samuel Vagg) (1825–1865)
- Benjamin Conquest né Benjamin Oliver (c. 1804–1872)
- John Cooper (c. 1793–1880)
- William Creswick (1813–1888)
- George Danson (1799–1881)
- Sir William Henry Don (1825–1862)
- John Ebers (1778–1858)
- Willie Edouin (William Frederick Bryer) (1846–1908)
- Sarah Louisa Fairbrother (1816–1890), wife of the Duke of Cambridge
- Richard Flexmore (1824–1860)
- Lydia Alice Foote (Legge) (1844–1892)
- Isabella Glyn (Dallas) (1823–1889)
- George Grossmith (1847–1912)
- John Pritt ('Fat Jack') Harley (1786–1858)
- Robb Harwood (c. 1870–1910)
- Catherine Hayes (1818–1861)
- Henry Holl (1811–1884)
- Charles Philip Kemble (1775–1854)
- Frances Anne Kemble (1809–1893)
- Imré Kiralfry (1845–1919)
- Frederick Lablache (1815–1887)
- Sarah Lane (1822–1899)
- Carlotta Le Clercq (1840–1893)
- Rose Le Clercq (1845–1899)
- Alfred Leslie (né Lester) (1874–1925)
- John Liston (1776–1864)
- William Edward Love (1806–1867)
- William Charles Macready (1793–1873)
- Florence Marryat (1838–1899)
- Charles James Mathews (1803–1878)
- Elizabeth Mathews (Lizzy Davenport) (1806–1899)
- Horace Mayhew (1816–1872)
- John Maddison Morton (1811–1891)
- Rosoman Mountain (c. 1768–1841)
- Ellen Amelia Orridge (1856–1883)
- Harold Pinter CH CBE (1930–2008)
- Sir Terence Mervyn Rattigan CBE (1911–1979)
- Robert Reece (1838–1891)
- Robert Roxby (1817–1866)
- Henry Russell (1812–1900)
- Charles Selby (born George Harvey Wilson) (1802–1863)
- Catherine Stephens, Countess of Essex (1794–1882)
- George Tyrrell Thorne (1856–1922)
- Theresa Catherine Johanna Tietjens (1831–1877)
- William Harries Tilbury (1806–1884)
- John Lawrence Toole (1830–1906)
- Lucia Elizabeth Vestris (1797–1836)
- Clara Vestris Webster (1821–1844)
- Alfred Sydney Wigan (1814–1878)
- John Wilson (1800–1849)
- Lewis Strange Wingfield (1842–1891)

== Writing ==
- William Harrison Ainsworth (1805–1882)
- Henry Spencer Ashbee (1834–1900)
- George Percy Badger (1815–1888)
- J. G. Ballard (1930-2009)
- Rev. Richard Harris Barham (1788–1845)
- Thomas Barnes (1785–1841)
- Robert Bell (1800–1867)
- James Boaden (1762–1839)
- Charles William Shirley Brooks (1816–1874)
- John Bruce (1802–1869)
- Maria Calcott (1785–1842)
- John Cassell (1817–1865)
- John Hobart Caunter (1792–1851)
- Frederic Chapman (1823–1895)
- Henry Colburn (died 1855)
- William Wilkie Collins (1824–1889)
- Edward Herbert Cooper (1867–1910)
- Walter Coulson (1794–1860)
- Eyre Evans Crowe (1799–1868)
- Sir Joseph Archer Crowe (1825–1896)
- George Darley (1795–1846)
- Robert Deverell (né Pedley) (1760–1841)
- Rev. Thomas Frognall Dibdin (1776–1847)
- Charles Wentworth Dilke (1789–1864)
- Rev. Alexander Dyce (1798–1869)
- George Dyer (1755–1841)
- Lady Elizabeth Eastlake (1809–1893)
- John Passmore Edwards (1823–1911)
- Giovanni Battista ('Tita') Falcieri (1798–1874)
- John Forster (1812–1876)
- Joseph Foster (1844–1905)
- Augustus Wollaston Franks (1826–1897)
- Erich Fried (1921–1988)
- Elias John Wilkinson Gibb (1857–1901)
- Alexander Gilchrist (1828–1861)
- Catherine Grace Frances Gore (1799–1861)
- Thomas Colley Grattan (1792–1864)
- Barnard Gregory (1796–1852)
- Sophia Peabody Hawthorne (1809–1871) and Una Hawthorne (1844–1877) (Remains moved to Concord, Massachusetts, in 2006.)
- Edward Peron Hingston (c. 1823–1876)
- Shadworth Holloway Hodgson (1832–1912)
- George Hogarth (1783–1870)
- Mary Scott Hogarth (1819–1837)
- Jane Hogg (1798–1837)
- Thomas Jefferson Hogg (1792–1862)
- Lady Saba Holland (died 1866)
- Thomas Hood (1798–1845)
- James Henry Leigh Hunt (1784–1859)
- John Winter Jones (1805–1881)
- William Martin Leake (1777–1860)
- Augusta Leigh (1784–1851)
- Thomas Henry Lister (1801–1842)
- Charlotte Sophia Lockhart (née Scott) (c. 1800–1837)
- Jane Wells Loudon (1807–1858)
- Samuel Lover (1797–1868)
- Frances Dunlop Lowell (1825–1885)
- John MacCreery (1768–1832)
- Charles Mackay (1814–1889)
- Frederick Madden (1801–1873)
- Henry Mayhew (1812–1887)
- John Murray (1778–1843)
- John Bowyer Nichols (1779–1863)
- John Francis O'Donnell (1837–1874)
- James Ripley Osgood (1836–1892)
- Julia Pardoe (1804–1862)
- William Pickering (1796–1854)
- Catherine Louisa Pirkis (1841–1910)
- James Pope-Hennessy CVO (1916–1974)
- Emil Reich (1854–1910)
- Thomas Mayne Reid (1818–1883)
- William Caldwell Roscoe (1823–1859)
- Frederick August Rosen (1805–1837)
- Edmund Routledge (1843–1899)
- Anne Scott (1803–1833)
- Henry Silver (1828–1910)
- Rev. Sydney Smith (1771–1845)
- Harriet Marian Minny Stephen (née Thackeray) (1840–1875)
- Benjamin Franklin Stevens (1833–1902)
- Tibor Szamuely (1925–1972)
- William Makepeace Thackeray (1811–1863)
- William Tooke (1777–1863)
- Anthony Trollope (1815–1882)
- Andrew White Tuer (1838–1900)
- Samuel Waddington (1844–1923)
- John Wade (1788–1875)
- John Weale (1791–1862)
- Charles Whittingham (1795–1876)
- Lady Jane Francesca Wilde ('Speranza', Oscar Wilde's mother) (1821–1896)
- Horace Hayman Wilson (1786–1860)
- Bernard Bolingbroke Woodward (1816–1869)
- Gustavus George Zerffi (1821–1892)

== Others ==
- Sir George Birkbeck (1776–1841), adult education pioneer
- Sir Claude Robert Campbell (1871–1900)
- Sophie Dawes, Baronne de Feuchères (c. 1792–1840), Anglo-French adventuress
- Sir Joshua Girling Fitch (1824–1903), educationalist
- Ann Foster (1827–1882) née Orchard and also Dinham and Riddiford. Former Australian convict.
- Angelica Patience Fraser (1823–1910), social reformer
- Robert Hibbert (1769–1849), Anti-Trinitarian, founder of Hibbert Trust
- Margaret Emily Hodge (1858–1938), suffragist
- Baron Gunther Rau von Holzhauzen (1882–1905)
- Andargachew Messai (1902–1981), Ethiopian diplomat
- Kate Meyrick (1875–1933), nightclub proprietor
- Walter Peart (died 1898), engine driver killed in an accident
- Alexis Benoit Soyer (1809–1858), chef
- Louisa Twining (1820–1912), charity worker
- Louis Eustache Ude (1768–1846)
- Richard Valpy (1754–1836), chef
- Kaye Webb MBE (1914–1996), editor and publisher
- Sir Charles George Young (1795–1869), officer of arms
