= Vacher =

Vacher is a surname of French origin. Its literal translation means a keeper of stock or cattle or a herdsman but is generally used by people whose ancestry is traced to the cow-herders. It is also used by a small group of people in India. People with the name include:

- Antoine Vacher (1873–1920), French geographer
- Charles Vacher, (1818–1883), watercolour painter
- Chris Vacher (born 1951), British television news presenter
- Georges Vacher de Lapouge (1854–1936), French anthropologist and theoretician of eugenics and racialism
- Joseph Vacher (1869–1898), French serial killer
- Laurent-Michel Vacher (1944–2005), French Canadian philosopher, writer, and journalist
- Paul Vacher (before 1936–1975), French perfumer
- Polly Vacher (born 1944), English aviator
- Sydney Vacher (fl. 1886–1890), English architect
- Thomas Brittain Vacher (1805–1880), English lithographer, legal stationer, and printer
- William Herbert Vacher (1826–1899), British merchant and banker
