= Hellicar =

Hellicar is a surname. Notable people with the surname include:

- Ames Hellicar (1847–1907), New Zealand cricketer
- Evelyn Hellicar (1862–1929), English architect
