= Charles Keetley =

Charles Keetley may refer to:

- Charlie Keetley (1906–1979), English football centre forward
- Charles Robert Bell Keetley (1848–1909), English physician
