= Robert Fellowes =

Robert Fellowes may refer to:

- Robert Fellowes, Baron Fellowes (1941–2024), private secretary to Elizabeth II
- Robert Fellowes (philanthropist) (1771–1847), English philanthropist
- Robert Fellowes (politician) (1742–1829), English politician, member of parliament for Norwich, 1802–1807

== See also ==
- Robert Fellows (1903–1969), American film producer
