= Thomas Uwins =

English painter (1782–1857)

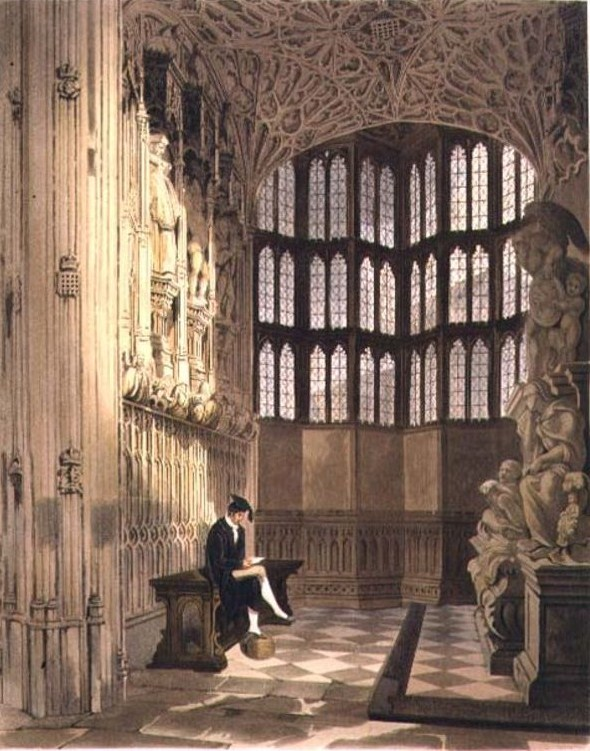
The Henry VII Chapel (1812 engraving)

Thomas Uwins RA RWS (24 February 1782, in London – 26 August 1857) was a British portrait, subject, genre and landscape painter in watercolour and oil, and a book illustrator. He became a full member of the Old Watercolour Society and a Royal Academician, and held a number of high-profile art appointments including the librarian of the Royal Academy, Surveyor of Pictures to Queen Victoria and the Keeper of the National Gallery.

== Life and work ==
=== Early years and training ===
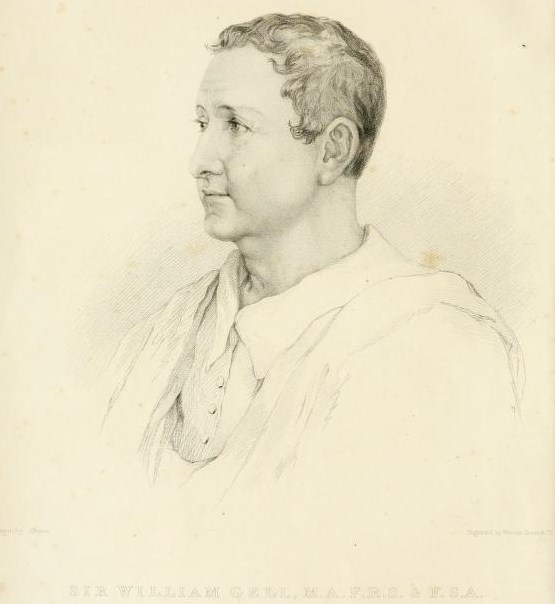
Portrait of Sir William Gell (1832 engraving)

Uwins was born at Hermes Hill, Pentonville in London. He was the youngest of the four children of Thomas Uwins, a clerk in the Bank of England. David Uwins (c. 1780-1837), physician and medical writer, was his elder brother. Thomas showed talent as an artist from an early age, and had some instruction from the drawing-master at his sister's school. He was a day scholar at Mr. Crole's school in Queen's Head Lane, Islington, for 6 years, and in 1797, at the age of 15, was apprenticed to the engraver Benjamin Smith (d. 1833). While with Smith he engraved part of a plate for John Boydell's editions of 'Shakespeare' but had an attack of jaundice, said to have been caused by overwork and dislike of the drudgery of engraving, and left without completing the apprenticeship.

In 1798, Uwins entered the schools of the Royal Academy, London, and joined Sir Charles Bell's anatomical class, supporting himself mainly by painting portrait miniature. He exhibited a portrait of a "Mr. G. Meyers" at the academy in 1799. He also - now or later - gave lessons in drawing, and about 1808 began to design frontispieces and vignettes to Thomas Day's "The History of Sandford and Merton", 'Robinson Crusoe' and others, for J. Walker of Paternoster Row. He also designed for bookseller Thomas Tegg (1776–1845), drew engravers' outlines for Charles Warren the engraver, and produced work for Rudolph Ackermann's 'Repository of Fashions' for which he also wrote articles signed 'Arbiter Elegantiarum'. One of his drawings exhibited at the academy in 1808 was a portrait of Charles Warren's daughter, Mrs. Luke Clennell, as Belphoebe in Spenser's 'Faerie Queene'.

=== Watercolour Society and travels to France ===
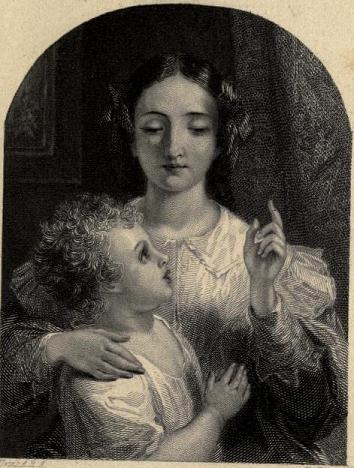
Illustration to George Herbert's "Mattens" (1834 engraving)

In 1809 Uwins joined the "Old Watercolour Society" as associate member, and in 1813 became a full member. From 1809 to 1818 he was a constant contributor to the society's exhibitions, sending illustrations of works by Henry Fielding, John Bunyan, Shakespeare, Laurence Sterne, and other authors, besides numerous pastoral scenes and figures. He served as secretary of the society in 1813–14 and 1816–17. In 1811 he stayed at Farnham, Surrey, studying the hopfields, and in 1815 visited the Lake District, where he met Wordsworth.

In 1817, after the Napoleonic Wars, he went to France to paint vintage scenes. He stayed for a short while at Paris, and was provided with letters of introduction,He passed through the Burgundy country to Bordeaux, where he stayed with the Cabareuss family, and visited the chateaux of all the principal growers. The result was seen in two drawings sent to the 'Old Watercolour' Society's exhibition of 1818. Some of his sketches later became the basis for the oil painting The Vintage (1847; Tate, London).

=== Life in Scotland ===
In 1818 Uwins resigned from the Old watercolour society to concentrate on paying off a debt relating to a security given to the Society of Arts. Continual work on miniatures seriously injured his eyesight, and in 1820 he went to Scotland to make topographical drawings to illustrate works by Sir Walter Scott, with whom he became well acquainted. He spent two years in Edinburgh painting and drawing portraits with much success, and on the occasion of the visit of George IV to Edinburgh in 1822, he executed two transparencies, one of which was twelve feet high.

=== Seven years in Italy ===
In 1824 Uwins travelled to Italy for his health. There he settled for the winter in Rome where he met a number of English artists, including Charles Eastlake and Joseph Severn. Uwins and Eastlake became close friends. Eastlake influenced Uwins in his technique, encouraging him to lighten his palette and to work on a larger scale. He also encouraged his friend to adopt similar themes to his own paintings. Uwin's subject matter began to include peasants and bandits in imitation of Eastlake.

The following spring he visited Naples and met Richard Acton who commissioned him to paint a number of Italian scenes. He remained in Naples for several years painting portraits of British and Austrian visitors. While in Italy he kept up a correspondence with his two brothers Zechariah and David, which was published after his death in A memoir of Thomas Uwins.

From 1829–30 Uwins sent his pictures of Italian subjects to the exhibitions of the British Institution and Royal Academy. In 1830 he exhibited "Neapolitans dancing the Tarantella", and, in 1832, The Neapolitan Saint Manufactury proved a great success in the RA exhibition. At about this time he returned to England and became gradually more involved in arts administration. He was elected an associate of the Royal Academy (ARA) in 1833, and a full academician (RA) in 1838.

=== Later work ===
In 1839 he exhibited one of his best pictures, Le Chapeau de Brigand. The little girl depicted was a daughter of a friend named Joseph, with whom he lived for some time. By 1870 it was one of the most frequently copied paintings at the National Gallery. It is now also at Tate. In 1843 he painted a fresco of the lady in John Milton's 'Comus' for the Queen's Pavilion in Buckingham Palace Gardens. In 1844 he was made librarian of the Royal Academy, and Surveyor of pictures to Queen Victoria (completing the first catalogue raisonné of the Royal Collection), and from 1847–55, keeper of the National Gallery - succeeding Sir Charles Eastlake.

In 1850 he married Sarah Kirby, and though without issue, the union was said to be a happy one. In 1854 he had a serious illness, and in 1855 gave up his various offices and retired to Staines, in Middlesex, an invalid. He carried on painting, however, until his death on 26 August 1857.

Honorary titles
Preceded by Richard Redgrave	Surveyor of the King's / Queen's Pictures; 1844-1856	Succeeded by Sir Augustus Wall Callcott
Preceded by Sir Charles Lock Eastlake	Keeper of the National Gallery; 1847-1855	Succeeded by Ralph Nicholson Wornum
