= Thomas Brittain Vacher =

Thomas Brittain Vacher (1805–1880) was a British lithographer, legal stationer, and printer.

He founded Vacher's Parliamentary Companion, a parliamentary reference work which continues to this day as Vachers Quarterly, published by Dods.

== Biography ==
Vacher was the son of the stationer Thomas Vacher of Parliament Street, Westminster, where he was born. He went into business with his brother George; the third son Charles Vacher was known as an artist. Thomas Brittain Vacher was himself an amateur artist. He married in 1850.

Vacher was the author of Brief Prayers for Travellers (1868). His son, the architect Sydney Vacher, designed the elaborate pulpit in St Margaret's church, Westminster as a memorial to him.

== See also ==
- William Herbert Vacher
