= Rugby Street =

Street in London, England

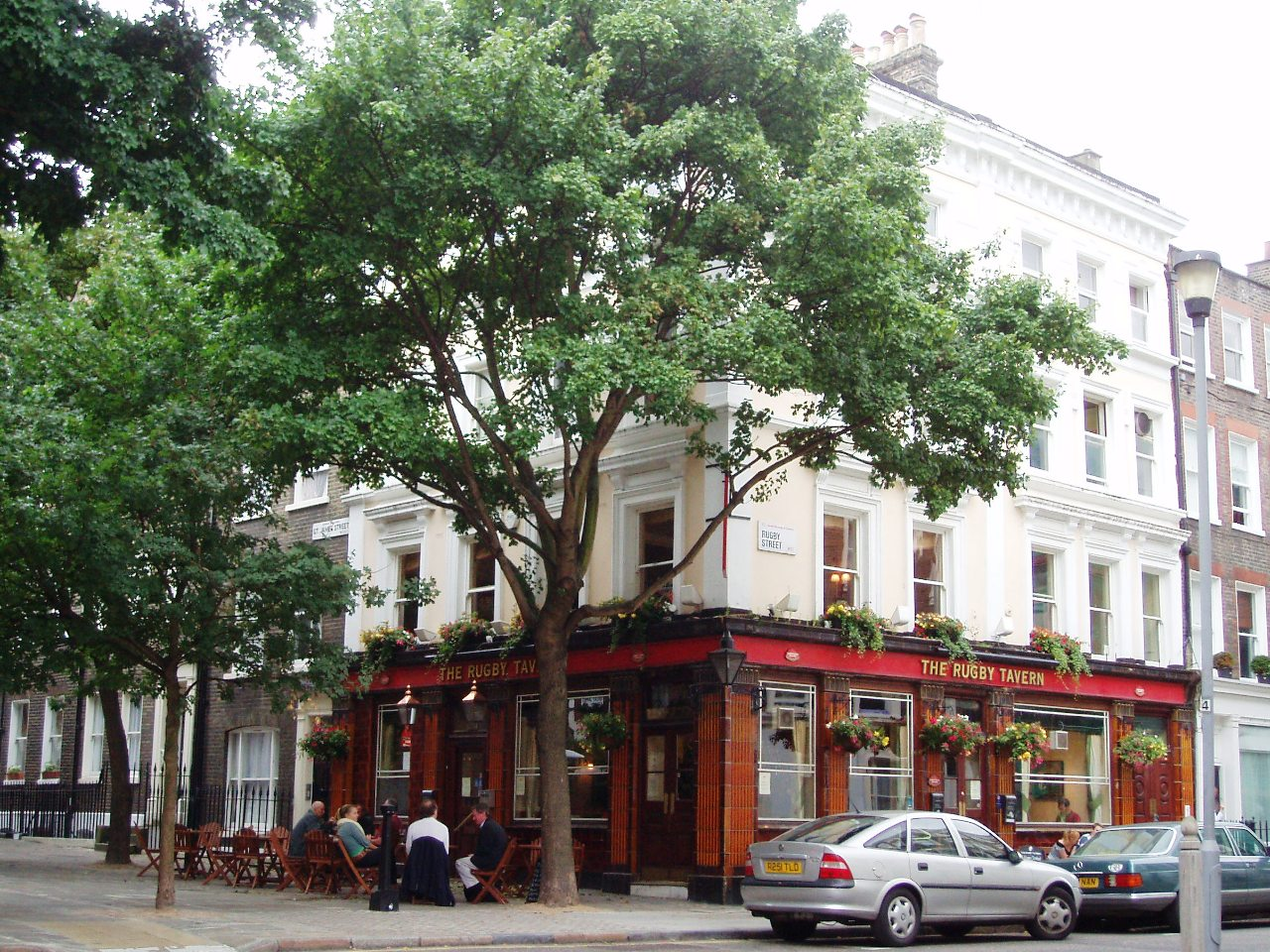
- The Rugby Tavern

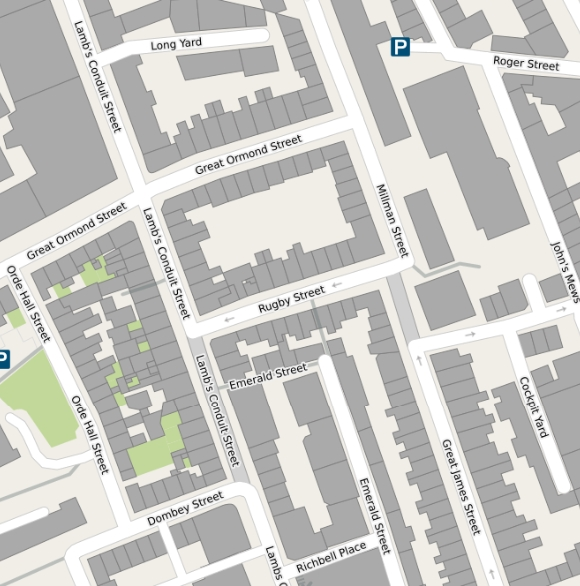
- Vicinity of Rugby Street (centre)
- Former name: Chapel Street
- Area: Bloomsbury, London
- Postal code: WC1
- Coordinates: 51.52179°N 0.11717°W

Construction
- Construction start: c.1700
- Completed: c.1721

Other
- Known for: The Rugby Tavern and the head of the White Conduit

Rugby Street, formerly known as Chapel Street, is a street in the Bloomsbury district of the London Borough of Camden. It was built between around 1700 and 1721 on land that was given to Rugby School in Warwickshire and now forms part of London's Rugby Estate. Many of its buildings are listed by Historic England such as the grade II The Rugby Tavern. It was renamed Rugby Street in 1936 or 1937. In the post-war period, number 18 was the home to many creative people and the house where Ted Hughes and Sylvia Plath spent their wedding night.

== Location ==
Rugby Street runs between Lamb's Conduit Street in the west and the junction of Great James Street and Millman Street in the east, in the Bloomsbury district of the London Borough of Camden. An alley known as Emerald Court joins the south side of the street to Emerald Street.

== History ==
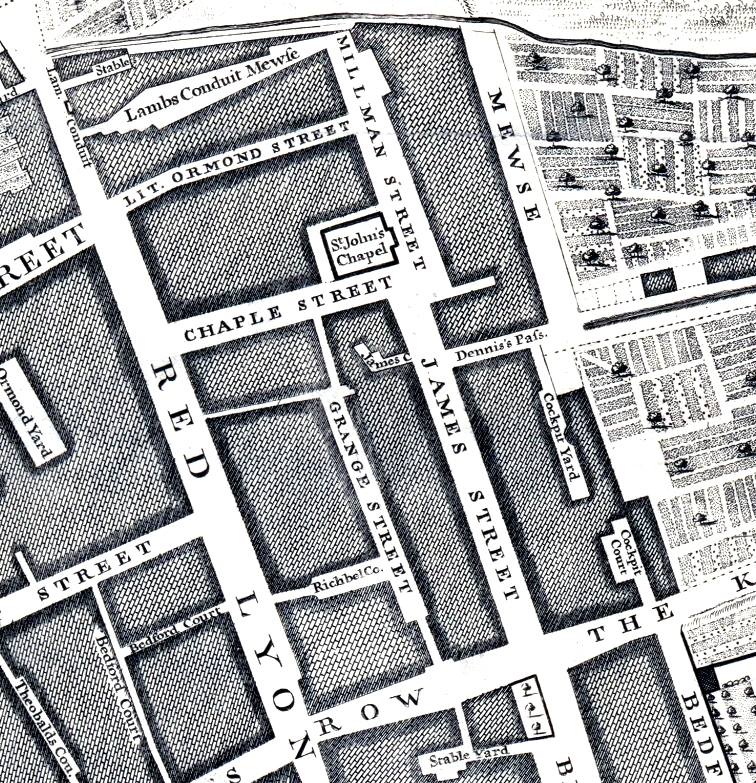
Chaple Street on John Rocque's map of 1746

Chapel Street, sometimes spelled Chaple Street, was built on part of eight acres of land given to Rugby School in 1567 by Lawrence Sheriff, the school's founder. It forms part of the Rugby Estate which was laid out for development in the 1680s and let to Sir William Milman after whom nearby Millman Street is named.

It began to be built around 1700 and was completed around 1721. The street was named after the Episcopal Chapel of St John, a Church of England chapel on the corner with Millman Street which was already in existence when Chapel Street began to be developed. The chapel was later demolished and Rugby Chambers built on the site in 1867.

The street was renamed Rugby Street in 1936 or 1937.

== Buildings ==
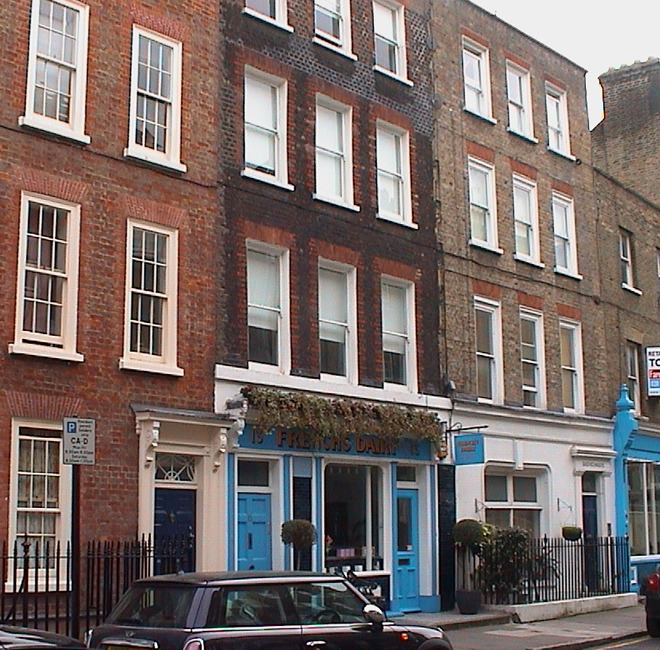
No. 13, below and behind which lies the White Conduit head

The street contains a number of listed buildings such as the grade II listed The Rugby Tavern on the corner with Great James Street which was created in the mid-nineteenth century by the joining of two houses, one from each street. Numbers 10 to 16 and 18 on the north side are also listed, as are numbers 7, 9, and 13 on the south side. Pevsner comments on the sensitive restoration of 10-16 by Rugby School in 1981 and the railings and carved doorcase of number 12.

To the rear and under number 13, formerly French's Dairy, lies the White Conduit head which supplied water to the Greyfriars Monastery in Newgate Street and which has been dated to 1258 or earlier. A plaque at the front notes the fact.

== Former residents ==
- Writer of London-based detective stories Charles Kingston O'Mahony lived at 14 Rugby Chambers in the 1900s.
- In 1956, poets Ted Hughes and Sylvia Plath spent their first night together at Hughes's flat in Rugby Street. He subsequently wrote the poem "18 Rugby Street" about the occasion in which he described the legendary reputation of the house and how its four floors acted as a stage set on which various romances played out:

They told me: 'You
Should write a book about this house. It's possessed!
Whoever comes into it never gets properly out!
Whoever enters it enters a labyrinth –
A Knossos of coincidence. And now you're in it.'

- Welsh manuscript expert Daniel Huws lived at number 18 at the same time as Hughes, as did the graphic designer Richard Hollis and a large number of others in the creative industries.
- English jazz musician, composer and arranger Roy Crimmins lived at number 14 in the 1980s.
