= Charles Kingston O'Mahony =

Irish journalist and author (c. 1884–1944)

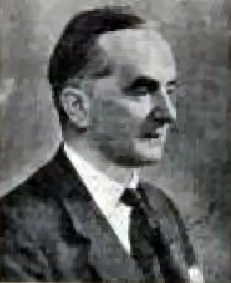
- Born: Charles Kingston O'Mahony c. 1884; Mitchelstown, Ireland
- Died: 9 November 1944 (aged 59–60); Surrey, England
- Occupations: Journalist and author
- Known for: Detective novels set in London

Charles Kingston O'Mahony (c. 1884 – 9 November 1944), who wrote as Charles Kingston, was an Irish journalist and author in England during the Golden Age of Detective Fiction of the 1920s and 1930s. Many of his novels were set in London, including a seven-book series featuring the fictional detective Chief Inspector Wake of Scotland Yard. His work has been described as more competent than cutting-edge, but showing a clear familiarity with the criminal underworld in London.

He also produced a number of popular non-fiction books that collected stories of fraudsters, murderers, and assorted rogues, as well as famous legal cases and stories of judges. Among his more high-brow works are a history of the viceroys of Ireland (1912), which was also his first book; a study of Morganatic marriages; stories of Monte Carlo; and a study of the literary associations of Esher and Thames Ditton, where he lived during his last years.

== Early life and family ==
Charles Kingston O'Mahony was born around 1884 in Mitchelstown, County Cork, in Ireland. In 1908, he was living at 14 Rugby Chambers in London's Rugby Street. He married Julia Christine Ellis in Staines, Middlesex, in 1910.

== Career ==
O'Mahony worked as a journalist and author. His first book was an historical study of The Viceroys of Ireland, published by John Long in London in 1912, which he wrote as Charles O'Mahony. Later he used the pen-name of Charles Kingston and wrote a number of popular non-fiction works such as Remarkable Rogues: The careers of some notable criminals of Europe and America (1921), Society Sensations (1922), and A Gallery of Rogues (1924). Between 1923 and 1930 he published eight books dealing with the law and the courts, such as, Famous Judges and Famous Trials, Dramatic Days at the Old Bailey, and The Judges and the Judged.

He published his first novel, Stolen Virtue, in 1921, afterwards publishing mainly detective fiction, often set in London, such as The Portland Place Mystery (1926), The Highgate Mystery (1928), and Poison in Kensington (1934). He published seven novels featuring Chief Inspector Wake of Scotland Yard, starting with Murder in Piccadilly in 1936. His publishers were principally the large popular publishers of his time such as John Lane, Stanley Paul, and Ward Lock.

== Reviews ==
O'Mahony's Remarkable Rogues (1921) was reviewed in The Saturday Review who described it as an "artless and somewhat dateless book written in the style of the novelette". A series of lively sketches, the Review found them more entertaining than edifying.

His Society Sensations was reviewed in The Bookman in 1922 who opined that his works were easy to assemble from newspaper reports, memoirs, and similar sources, but acknowledged their entertainment value and that there was a significant market for such works. Of the book under review, they noted that most of the scandals involved men's misadventures with women and that a cynic might view the book "as a warning against marriage and women in general".

Enemies of Society (1927) was a selection of murders that The Saturday Review noted included five doctors of medicine such as the "Lambeth poisoner" and serial killer Dr Thomas Neill Cream, and the lexicographer Dr William Chester Minor. In 1928, the same publication wrote of O'Mahony's choice of Rogues and Adventuresses that some figures from the past are "best forgotten" while The Bookman said that at least O'Mahony was honest in attempting to do no more than entertain, which he did with a terse and vigorous prose style, even if his taste was somewhat morbid.

In fiction, The Portland Place Mystery (1926) was described as working its way "smoothly along the accepted lines of high life romance." Poison in Kensington (1934) features a blackmailing doctor of medicine whose motives are revealed to be pure in the end in a plot the reviewer found unlikely. Murder in Piccadilly (1936) was republished by Poisoned Pen Press in 2015 in the British Library Crime Classics series with an introduction by crime writer Martin Edwards in which he characterised O'Mahony's work as traditional, competently plotted, and "infused with a quiet sense of humour", but observed that the plot of inter-generational conflict leading to murder was not new, even to O'Mahony's work, and he was not in the avant-garde of 1930s crime writing. Nonetheless, Edwards identified in O'Mahony an affinity for the London underworld found in districts such as Soho, and a willingness for his characters to mention contemporary criminal cases such as the rape and murder of 10 year old Vera Page in 1931 which is referenced in the book by O'Mahony's detective Wake. The book is also notable for leaving the murder, and the introduction of Wake who will solve it, until halfway through the story.

== Death and legacy ==
O'Mahony died in the county of Surrey, England, on 9 November 1944. His address at the time of his death was The Old Red Cottage, Weston Green, Esher. He left an estate of £282. His last book, Fear Followed On, in the Chief Inspector Wake series, was published posthumously by Stanley Paul in 1945.

== Selected publications ==
=== Fiction ===
==== 1920s ====
- Stolen Virtue. Stanley Paul, London, 1921.
- A Miscarriage of Justice. Stanley Paul, London, 1925.
- The Portland Place Mystery. Federation Press, London, 1926.
- The Highgate Mystery. John Lane, London, 1928.
- The Guilty House. John Lane, London, 1928.
- The Infallible System. John Lane, London, 1929.

==== 1930s ====
- The Great London Mystery. John Lane, London, 1931.
- Poison in Kensington. Ward Lock, London, 1934.
- The Brighton Beach Mystery. Ward Lock, London, 1936.
- Murder in Piccadilly. Ward Lock, London, 1936.
- The Circle of Guilt. Ward Lock, London, 1937.
- The Rigdale Puzzle. Ward Lock, London, 1937.
- Murder in Disguise. Ward Lock, London, 1938.
- Burning Conscience. Ward Lock, London, 1938.
- I Accuse. Mellifont, London, 1939.
- Slander Villa. Ward Lock, London, 1939.
- The Secret Barrier. Ward Lock, London, 1939.

==== 1940s ====
- Six Under Suspicion. Ward Lock, London, 1940.
- The Delacott Mystery. Ward Lock, London, 1941.
- Vain Pride. Ward Lock, London, 1941
- Mystery in the Mist. Ward Lock, London, 1942.
- Murder Tunes In. Ward Lock, London, 1942.
- Death Came Back. Stanley Paul, London, 1944.
- Fear Followed On. Stanley Paul, London, 1945.

=== Non-fiction ===
- The Viceroys of Ireland. London: John Long. 1912.
- Famous Morganatic Marriages. Stanley Paul, London, 1919.
- Remarkable Rogues: The careers of some notable criminals of Europe and America. John Lane, London, 1921.
- Royal Romances and Tragedies. Stanley Paul, London, 1921.
- Society Sensations. Stanley Paul, London, 1922.
- Famous Judges and Famous Trials. Stanley Paul, London, 1923.
- Dramatic Days at the Old Bailey. Stanley Paul, London, 1923.
- A Gallery of Rogues. Stanley Paul, London, 1924.
- The Bench and the Dock. Stanley Paul, London, 1925.
- The Judges and the Judged. John Lane, London, 1926.
- Enemies of Society. Stanley Paul, London, 1927.
- Rogues and Adventuresses. John Lane, London, 1928.
- Law-Breakers. John Lane, London, 1930.
- The Shadow of Monte Carlo and other Stories of the Principality. Grant Richards, London, 1931.
- Literary Associations of Esher and Thames Ditton, Wolsey Press, Esher, 1943.
