= Sydney Vacher =

English architect

- Born: 2 April 1854; Kensington, England
- Died: 11 January 1935 (aged 80); Portsmouth, Hampshire, UK
- Occupation: architect
- Notable work: see list

Sydney Vacher (2 April 1854 – 11 January 1935) was an English architect.

== Biography ==
Vacher was born at Kensington, the son of Thomas Brittain Vacher (1805–80). He entered a partnership with Evelyn Hellicar in the late 1880s; their office was at 35 Wellington Street, The Strand, London. Together they won the competition to design the Valley Primary School, Shortlands, Kent in 1889. He served as Master Salter for 1910/11.

Vacher married Janet Dumas in 1884 and died at Portsmouth, aged 80.

== Publications ==
- Fifteenth Century Italian Ornament, London, Bernard Quaritch, 1886.

== Architectural designs ==
- 1888: 96 Plaistow Lane, Bromley
- 1890: Valley Primary School, Beckenham Lane, Shortlands, Kent
- Measured Drawings of Westminster Abbey
- Pulpit (in Memory of Thomas Brittain Vacher) in St Margaret's Church, Westminster, London
- 1890: 99 Plaistow Lane, Bromley

=== Work exhibited at RA ===
Vacher's work exhibited at the Royal Academy of Arts included:

- 1882: West front of Cathedral, Famagusta, Cyprus
- 1882: South front of Cathedra, Famagusta, Cyprus
- 1883: Design for an Infirmary, Hastings
- 1884: A suburban house, Elstree, Herts
- 1887: Design for tower and spire, All Saints, Peterborough
- 1890: Design for Post Office, Hertford (with Evelyn Hellicar)
