= Thomas James Arnold =

Thomas James Arnold (1804? – 19 May 1877) was an English barrister.

== Biography ==
Arnold was a barrister and man of letters, was the son of Stephen James Arnold, and was born about 1804. He was called to the bar in 1829, was appointed magistrate at the Worship Street police-court in 1847, and transferred to the Westminster court in 1851. He died, still holding this appointment, on 19 May 1877, being then senior London police magistrate, and is buried at Kensal Green Cemetery.

== Works ==
Arnold wrote legal manuals on the law of municipal corporations, the labour laws, and other subjects. As a translator he is known by his versions of Goethe's Reineke Fuchs (1860), of Faust (1877), and of Anacreon (1869). The translation of Reineke Fuchs is a very creditable work; that of 'Faust' is respectable, but inferior to some later versions, and, having been published in folio form as an accompaniment to a volume of illustrations, is but little known. The translator of Anacreon has only the alternative of baldness or infidelity, and Mr. Arnold chose the former. He also translated Schiller's Song of the Bell, and wrote an able review of the controversy respecting Mr. Collier's annotated Shakespeare folio in Fraser's Magazine for January 1860. This was to have been continued, but the sequel never appeared. He was a man of great culture and accomplishments, an intimate friend of Shelley's friend, Thomas Love Peacock, and the son-in-law of Shelley's biographer, Thomas Jefferson Hogg. (Note: Annual Register, 1877)
