= William Denholm Kennedy =

Scottish historical genre and landscape painter (1813–1865)

- Born: 16 June 1813; Dumfries, Scotland
- Died: 2 June 1865 (aged 51); London, England

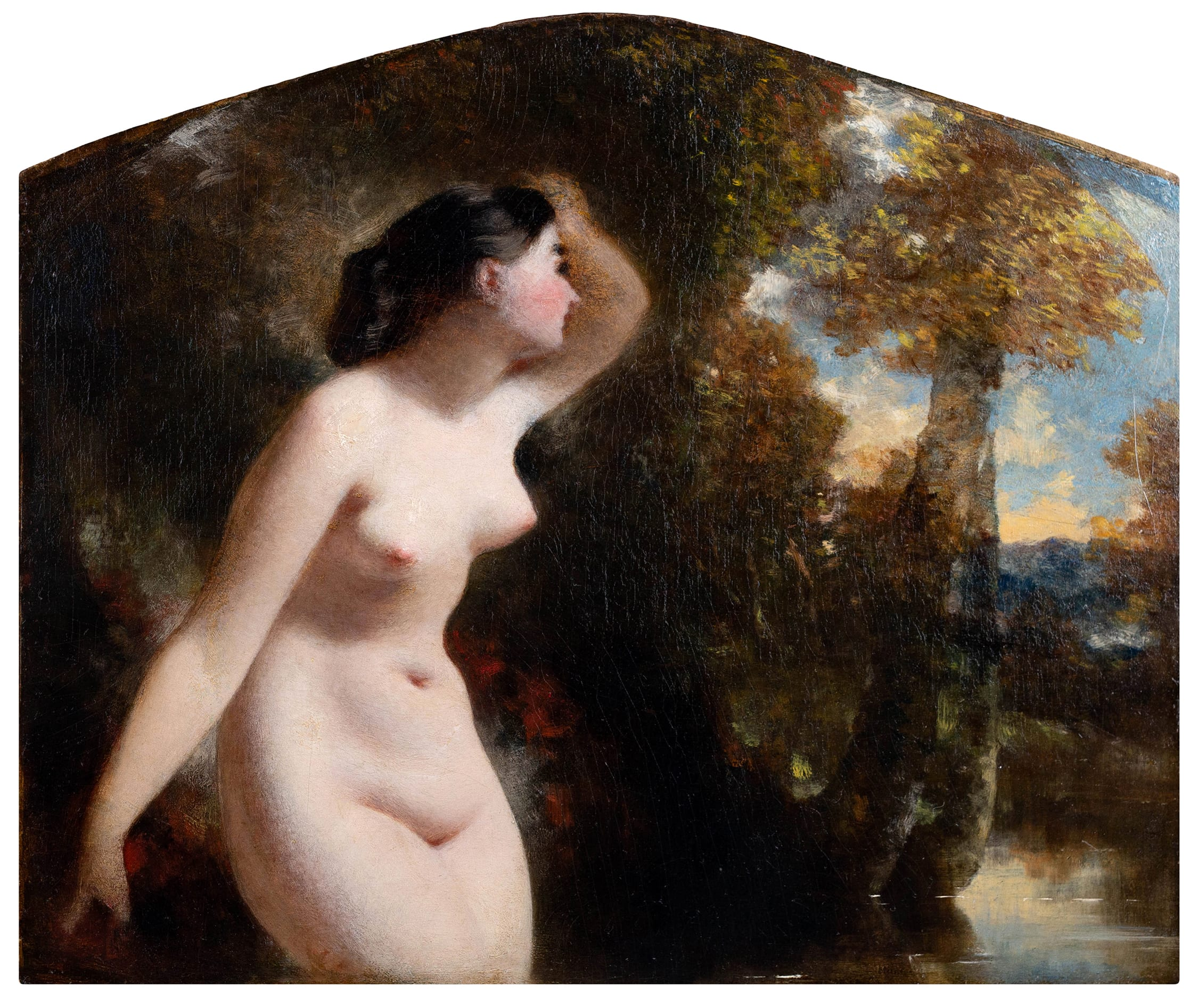
A Water Nymph (attributed)

William Denholm Kennedy (16 June 1813 – 2 June 1865) was a Scottish historical, genre and landscape painter.

== Life ==
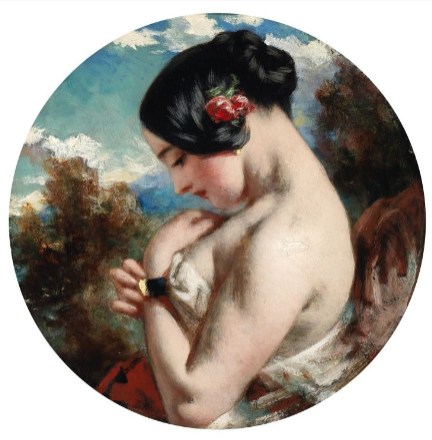
The Head of a Girl

William Denholm Kennedy, born at Dumfries on 16 June 1813, was educated in early life at Edinburgh. When seventeen years of age he came to London, and in 1833 entered the school of the Royal Academy. Here he began a lifelong friendship with William Etty, RA, who sensibly influenced his style as an artist. In 1833 he sent his first pictures to the Royal Academy, A Musical Party and The Toilet, and continued to exhibit there almost every year until his death. In 1835 he won the Academy gold medal for an historical painting, Apollo and Idas, and in 1840, being awarded the travelling allowance, went to Italy, where he spent two years in study at Rome. He returned with many sketches and studies of Italian scenery, and an Italian influence was subsequently visible in his work, especially in such pictures as The Bandit Mother, The Italian Goatherd, The Land of Poetry and Song, and others. Kennedy, however, failed to fulfil his early promise, and his work deteriorated. He died suddenly at his house in Soho Square on 2 June 1865.

Kennedy was a cultivated man, fond of music, and a good judge of etchings and engravings. His subjects for painting embraced almost everything except portraiture. He occasionally exhibited at the other leading exhibitions besides the Academy. He frequently assisted Thomas Willement with designs for stained glass, among others those for the windows in St. Stephen's, Walbrook, London.
