= Ames Hellicar =

New Zealand cricketer

Personal information
- Born: 2 March 1847; Bristol, England
- Died: 27 December 1907 (aged 60); St Kilda, Melbourne, Australia

Domestic team information
- Years: Team
- 1872/73: Otago
- Source: CricInfo, 14 May 2016

Ames Hellicar (2 March 1847 – 27 December 1907) was a New Zealand cricketer. He played one first-class match for Otago during the 1872–73 season.

Ames Hellicar was born in Bristol, England, and emigrated with his family to Australia when he was seven. After attending Melbourne Church of England Grammar School, he joined the Bank of Australasia, and worked for the bank in various posts in Australia and New Zealand before being appointed manager of the Sydney branch in 1887. In 1905 he was appointed the bank's superintendent, working in its Melbourne headquarters. However, illness soon forced him to retire, and he died in December 1907 at his home in St Kilda.

Hellicar's only senior cricket match was the only first-class match played in New Zealand during the 1872–73 season. The match, which was played against Canterbury at Christchurch saw him top score for Otago with 15 runs in the side's first innings―the only batsman to reach double figures in a team score of 43 all out―and then score two in the second as Otago lost by an innings.
