= Marcus Antonius Waters =

Major-General Marcus Antonius Waters (6 November 1793 – 14 January 1868) was an Irish-born British Army officer who was the last surviving Royal Engineers officer who fought at the battles of Quatre Bras and Waterloo.

Born in County Dublin, Waters joined the Royal Engineers as a cadet in 1809, just age 15. He served in the Peninsular War from April 1812 to September 1814, fighting at the Siege of Cádiz. In addition to Quatre Bras and Waterloo, he led one of the columns at the Assault of Péronne on 26 June 1815 and was at the capture of Paris.

He is buried at Kensal Green Cemetery in London.
