= Philip Cadell Peebles =

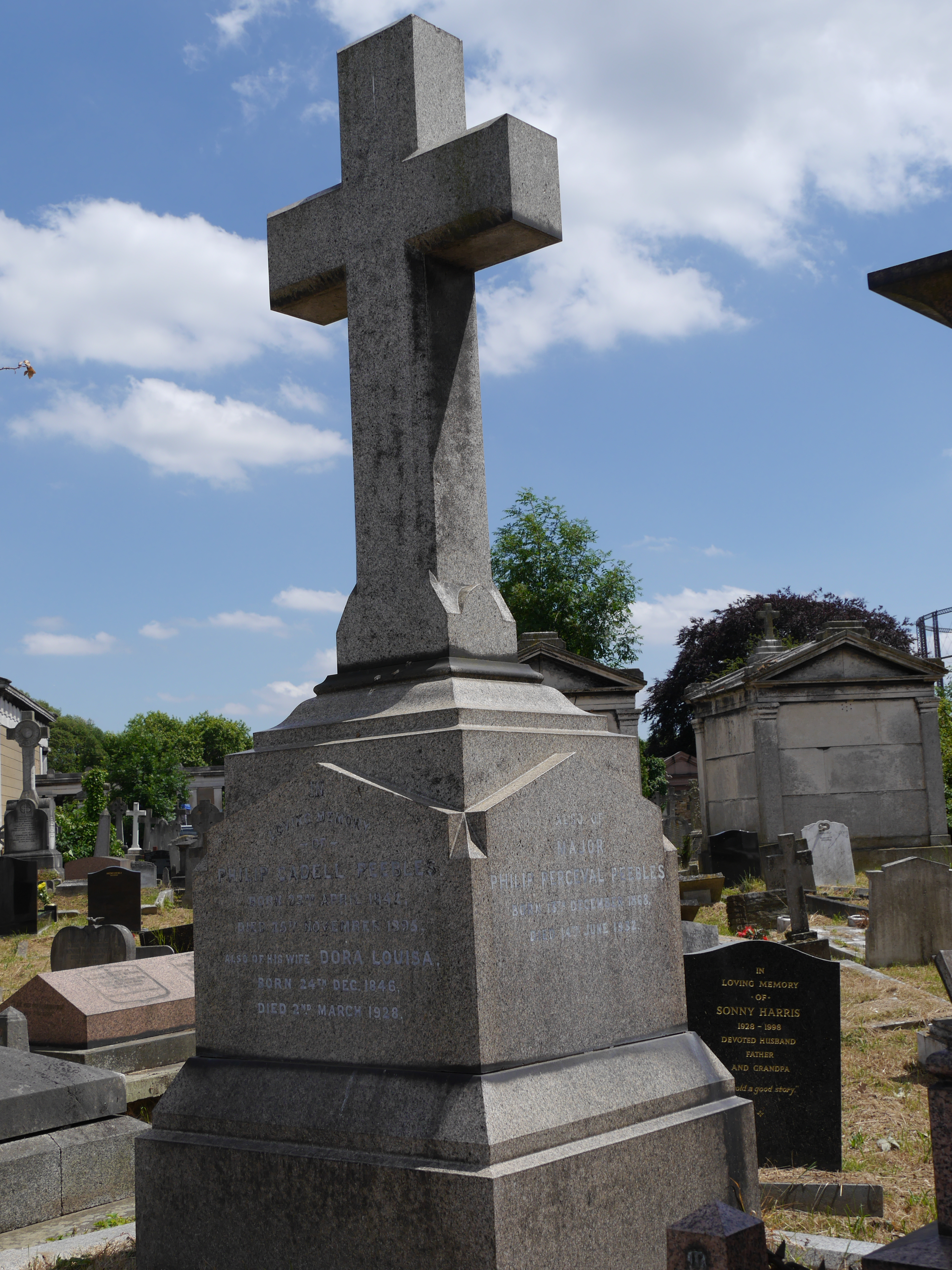
Memorial, Kensal Green Cemetery

Philip Cadell Peebles (1842–1895) was a British paper manufacturer and racehorse owner.

He was head of A. M. Peebles and Son, Rishton and Whiteash Mills, Lancashire.

In 1879, he bought the Rishton Paper Making and Staining Co., Ltd, which was formed in 1874, but went into liquidation in 1878. There was a serious fire on 6 April 1883, a three-storey building was gutted, and three tons of Esparto grass was destroyed. There was insurance cover.

Rishton Mill was closed by Robert Maxwell in February 1981.
