= Robert Wade (surgeon) =

British surgeon

Robert Wade FRCS (1798–1872) was a British surgeon.

He was one of the original Fellows of the Royal College of Surgeons.

He is buried at Kensal Green Cemetery.
