= David Uwins =

David Uwins (c.1780–22 September 1837) was an English medical doctor and medical writer.

== Life ==
Born in London about 1780, he was the second son of Thomas Uwins (died 1806), clerk in the Bank of England, and brother of Thomas Uwins, the artist. After working in London hospitals he graduated with an MD from the University of Edinburgh on 12 September 1803. Returning to London, he held for a short time the post of assistant physician at the Finsbury dispensary, and then established himself at Aylesbury in Buckinghamshire. On 22 December 1807 he was admitted a licentiate of the Royal College of Physicians, and in 1815 was elected physician to the City dispensary, and later to the new Finsbury and central dispensary.

In 1828 Uwins was appointed physician to the lunatic asylum at Peckham. In later life, through his friend Frederic Hervey Foster Quin, he became one of the first English converts to homeopathy. He encountered opposition, and suffered a breakdown.

Uwins died in London at his house in Bedford Row on 22 September 1837, and was buried at Kensal Green cemetery.

== Works ==
Uwins published in 1833 A Treatise on those Disorders of the Brain and Nervous System which are usually considered and called Mental. It established his medical reputation. He announced his convictions as a mhomeopath in a pamphlet Homœopathy and Allopathy, or Large, Small, and Atomic Doses. He wrote also:

- Modern Medicine, London, 1808.
- Cursory Observations on Fever, London, 1810.
- Modern Maladies and the Present State of Medicine, London, 1818.
- A Compendium of Theoretical and Practical Medicine, London, 1825.
- A Treatise on those Diseases which are either directly or indirectly connected with Indigestion, comprising a Commentary on the Principal Ailments of Children, London, 1827.
- Nervous and Mental Disorders, London, 1830.

Uwins wrote medical articles for George Gregory's Dictionary of the Arts and Sciences, 1806; and contributed to the "Reports" series, begun by John Reid in the Monthly Magazine. He wrote two articles in the Quarterly Review, on "Insanity and Madness" in July 1816, and on "Vaccination" in July 1818, and for a time edited the Medical Repository.

== Notes ==
Attribution

This article incorporates text from a publication now in the public domain: Lee, Sidney, ed. (1899). "Uwins, David". Dictionary of National Biography. Vol. 58. London: Smith, Elder & Co.
