= Angelica Fraser =

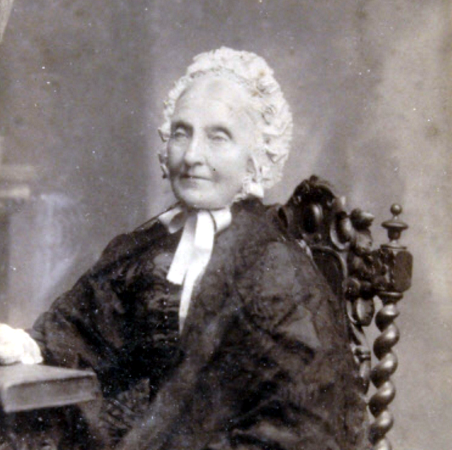
- Born: Angelica Patience Fraser; 25 January 1823; Aberdeen, Scotland
- Died: 27 November 1910 (aged 87); London

Angelica Patience Fraser (25 January 1823 – 27 November 1910) was a Scottish social reformer. She was active in arranging Bible-based education for tailors and "Tailors' Hall" was opened in London. In Edinburgh, she founded a temperance society for tailors and another for working women.

== Life ==
Fraser was born in Aberdeen in 1823. Her mother, Agnes, died when she was eleven and she took a strong interest in religion. Her father, Alexander, was the Lord Provost of Aberdeen (1815–1817).

Fraser became interested in the education and well-being of tailors. In 1856, she first entered a tailor's workshop to educate them. She arranged for volunteers to read from the Bible as the tailors worked. The idea caught on and similar groups of lady readers were established in Belfast, London, and Liverpool to read to tailors as they worked.

Fraser thought that the tailors would improve their own working conditions if they were better informed and educated, and in 1875 she formed the Edinburgh Tailors' Abstinence Union.

In 1876, she formed the Scottish Ladies' Temperance Society. The society intended to open public houses where alcohol would not be served. They identified laundresses, cooks and similar jobs which made women prone to the temptation of drink. The society planned to make them total abstainers.

Fraser moved to London in 1879 and the following year organised a conference on matters important to tailors. By 1885 money had been raised to open an institute with a lecture hall and a reading room. It was known as "Tailors' Hall". She became known as the tailors' "Florence Nightingale" or the "Tailors' Friend". In 1906, on the 50th anniversary of her first work with tailors she established an endowment fund to raise £5000 to ensure the continued work at Tailors' Hall.

Fraser remained a regular visitor to Tailors' Hall until she died at her home in London in November 1910.
