= Robert William Mackay =

Robert William Mackay (1803–1882) was a British philosophical and religious author. He is best known for The Progress of the Intellect (1850). Charles Hardwick in his Christ and other Masters grouped Mackay's religious views, with those of William Johnson Fox and Theodore Parker, as falling under a heading "absolute religion".

== Life ==
Born 27 May 1803 in Piccadilly, London, he was the only son of John Mackay, and was educated at Winchester College. He matriculated at Brasenose College, Oxford, 15 January 1821, graduating B.A. 1824 and M.A. 1828, and winning the chancellor's prize for Latin verse. He was called to the bar at Lincoln's Inn in 1828, but turned to theology and philosophy.

Mackay was independently wealthy, and a supporter of the Westminster Review. He was a secularist follow of George Jacob Holyoake, but did not share his political views. He died 23 February 1882.

== Works ==
Mackay was in the group of freethinkers associated with John Chapman. He published:

- The Progress of the Intellect, as exemplified in the Religious Development of the Greeks and Hebrews, 1850, 2 vols. George Eliot, in the Westminster Review, saw his idea of the primacy of nature worship as based on Friedrich Creuzer. In the secularist journal The Reasoner, there was an enthusiastic review in 1851 signed "Panthea" (Sophia Dobson Collet).
- A Sketch of the Rise and Progress of Christianity, 1854. It draws heavily on the works of the theologian Ferdinand Christian Baur. It also built on "intellectual religion", the term used in the book for the views of Francis Newman and the "New Reformation" group of writers then gathered around the Westminster Review.
- The Tübingen School and its Antecedents: a Review of the History and Present Condition of Modern Theology, 1863
- The Eternal Gospel, 1867 tract in two parts; joint publisher Thomas Scott (1808–1878).
- The Adversaries of St. Paul in 2nd Corinthians, 1875; publisher Thomas Scott.

The Sophistes of Plato, translated, with explanatory Notes and an Introduction on Ancient and Modern Sophistry, 1868, and Plato's Meno, translated, with explanatory Notes and Introduction, and a preliminary Essay on the Moral Education of the Greeks, 1869, were translations.

== Family ==
Mackay married in 1852 Frances Maseres Fellowes, daughter of Robert Fellowes, who survived him.
