= William Wood Deane =

English architect and painter (1825–1873)

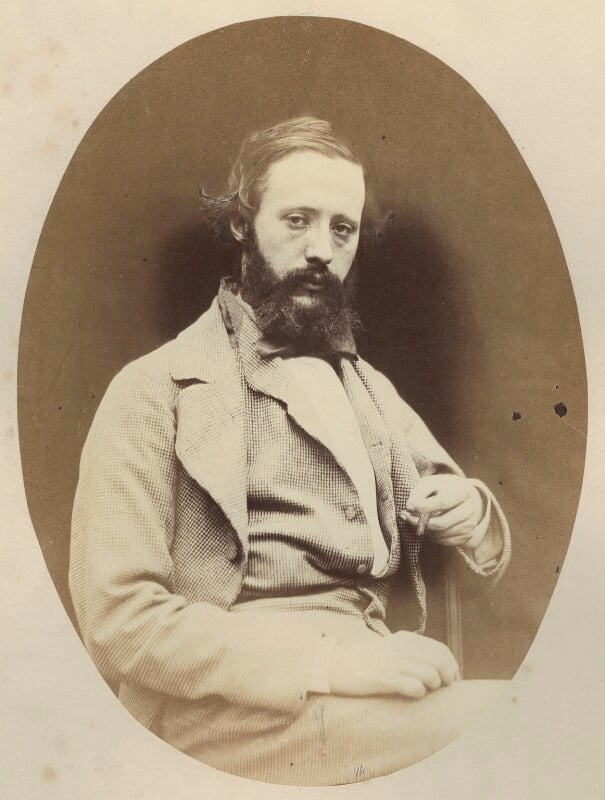
- Deane in the 1850s
- Born: 22 March 1825; London, U.K.
- Died: 18 January 1873 (aged 47); London, U.K.
- Education: Royal Academy
- Occupation: Architect
- Parent(s): John Wood Deane; Anna Maria Glasse
- Awards: Silver medal, Royal Academy; Students' book prize for a design at the Royal Institute of British Architects; Elected associate of the Institute of Painters in Water Colours; Medal at the Vienna Exhibition
- Buildings: Langham Chambers; private houses

William Wood Deane (22 March 1825 – 18 January 1873) was an English architect and painter.

== Biography ==
=== Early life ===
Deane was born on 22 March 1825, in Liverpool Road, Islington, London, the third son of John Wood Deane and Anna Maria Glasse (whose father had been mayor of Barnstaple). John W. Deane while in the merchant service made a drawing from the Henry Addington of the surrender the Cape of Good Hope to the Dutch in February 1803. On 1 June 1805 he published a coloured etching of this. He afterwards became a cashier at the Bank of England and devoted all his spare time to water-colour drawing.

During the mastership of John Jackson, W. W. Deane went to the Islington proprietary school and gained prizes for mathematics, perspective, and French. He showed early a taste for drawing, but as his elder brother Dennis Wood Deane had become an artist, his father decided to make him an architect, and articled him on 7 September 1842 for four years to Herbert Williams, a surveyor. On 13 January 1844, he became an architectural student of the Royal Academy, and in December 1844 gained the silver medal. On 21 July 1845 he gained the students' book prize for a design at the Royal Institute of British Architects.

On quitting Williams in 1846, Deane went as an assistant to David Mocatta for a short time. In 1848 he became an associate of the Royal Institute of British Architects. Some of his designs were exhibited in the Royal Academy from 1844. About this time he took up with private theatricals, and played at Miss Kelly's theatre, which he subsequently decorated. In 1850 he went with his brother Dennis to Italy, and while at Rome he became a friend of George Hemming Mason. He returned to London in the spring of 1852 with his folios full of measured drawings and water-colour sketches, gave lessons in water-colour drawing to young architects, and started as an architect in partnership with Alfred Bailey, a surveyor. They eventually settled at 13 Great James Street, Bedford Row, and he separated from Bailey in 1855. During his architectural career he gained a premium in competition, and built Langham Chambers, which elicited the praise of Owen Jones. He also built some houses in London and the country, but virtually relinquished practical architecture in 1856 for drawing on wood, and making designs and perspectives for architects.

=== Italy ===
At this time, he was the centre of a circle of young architects and artists who admired his ability, versatility and conversation. After his return from Italy he spent most of his summers sketching in the country, in 1856 in Normandy, in 1857 in Belgium, and in 1859 at Whitby. On his mother's death in September 1859 he inherited a small sum of money, and determined to devote himself to painting, the original desire of his youth. He removed to 17 Maitland Park Terrace, Haverstock Hill, in 1860, and spent a good part of the year sketching in Cumberland. He was elected an associate of the Institute of Painters in Water Colours in 1862.

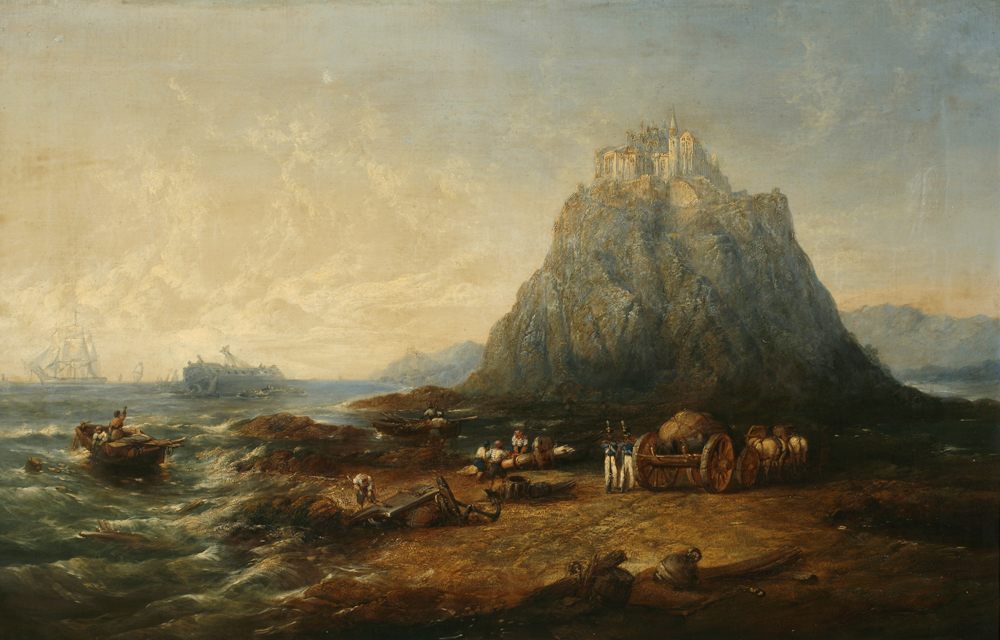
St. Michael's Mount, by William Wood Deane

In May 1865, he left for Venice, intending to settle in Italy, but returned in October of the same year, and went to 64 King Henry's Road, Hampstead. He was a born sketcher, but made great strides in the technical knowledge of his art during his stay in Venice. The Rialto and the Interior of Sta. Maria dei Miracoli were fine specimens of the capabilities of water colour. In 1866 he travelled in Spain with Francis William Topham. The oriental character of Spain seems to have acted as a spur to his powers; his drawing of the Gates of the Alhambra was one of his most brilliant works. The Fair at Seville, with its lines of tents, clouds of dust, and picturesque horsemen; his Bull Ring at Seville, with its brutal crowd in the shade, and the blazing sunshine in the arena, suddenly raised his art from the tranquil portraiture of stately buildings and a pearly atmosphere to a higher and more imaginative level, and gained him his membership in the autumn of 1867. Every year he went to France, Germany, or Italy, and made elaborate studies of the subjects he meant to paint.

=== Later years and death ===
In 1870, he was elected an associate of the Society of Painters in Water Colours, and in the autumn of this year he went to Scotland for his health. At the end of the year, he was attacked with inflammation of the liver, and though he was brought to death's door he contributed drawings of Sta. Maria della Salute, Jedburgh Abbey, and the N. Porch of Chartres to his gallery in 1871; in 1872 he went to Florence, Verona, and Perugia, and made a fine drawing of the Basilica of San Miniato, exhibited after his death.

His drawings were mainly of architectural subjects, and were distinguished by the purity of their colour, their pearly greys, and the effects of sunlight. Among his brother artists he was called an impressionist. He was a constant exhibitor also at the Royal Academy. During his artistic career he designed a studio for Topham, a nest of studios for his son, and the country schools of the Drapers' Company for H. Williams.

Deane died at his house on 18 January 1873 of liver cancer, and was buried at Kensal Green cemetery. The same year he was awarded a medal at the Vienna Exhibition for the Bull Ring at Seville.

== Family ==
Deane married Ellen Maria Aitchison, sister of George Aitchison.
