= William Edward Love =

English impressionist (1806–1867)

William Edward Love (6 February 1806 – 16 March 1867) was an English impressionist.

== Biography ==
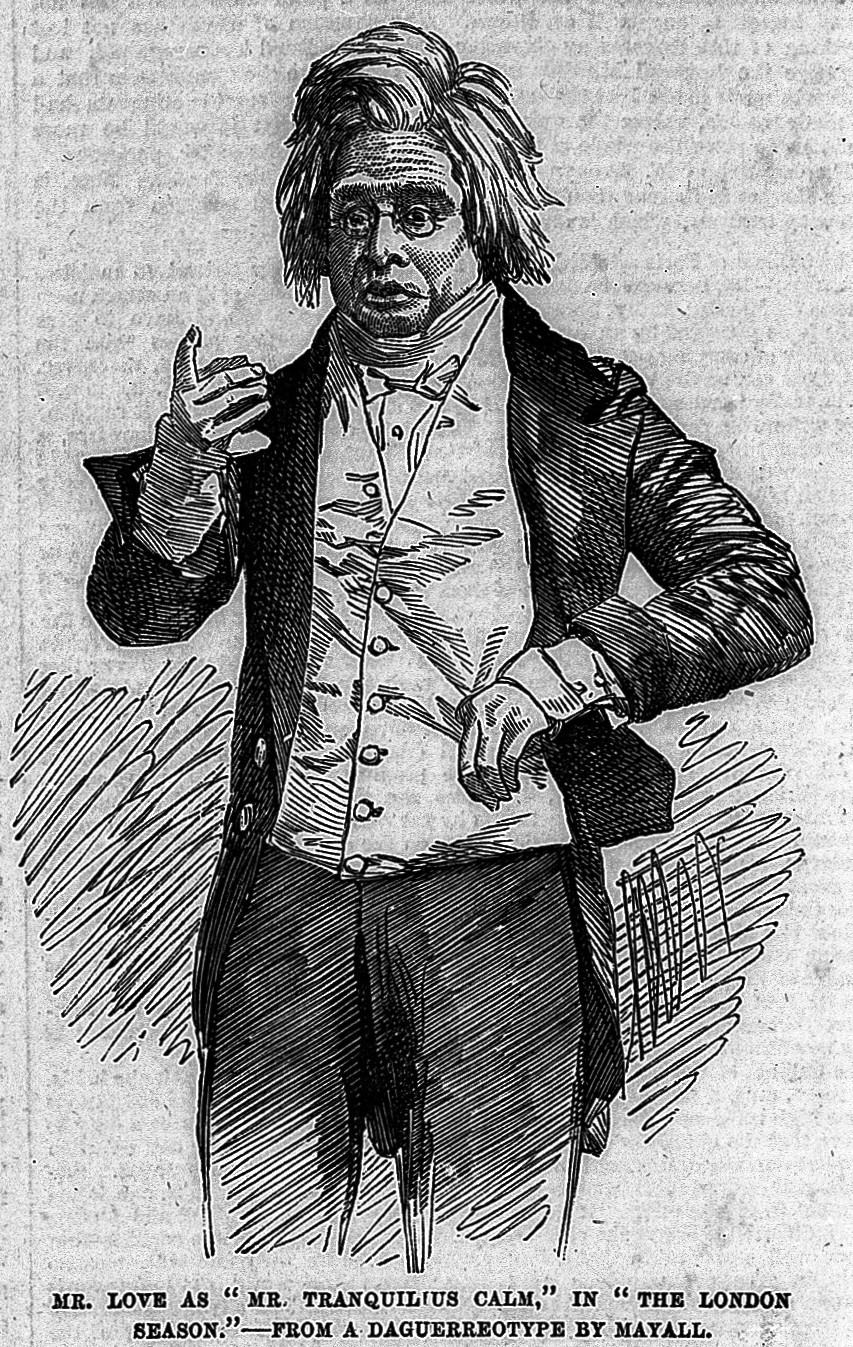
William Edward Love, polyphonist, 1855

Love, son of a merchant in the city of London, was born in London 6 February 1806, and was educated at Harlow in Essex and at Nelson House Academy, Wimbledon, Surrey.

At the age of twelve, while still at school, he commenced imitating the noises occasioned by the action of machinery and inanimate objects, and soon proceeded to mimic the sounds made by musical instruments, beasts, birds, and insects.

From about 1820 to 1826, he was connected with London journalism. In the latter year, he appeared for a benefit in a solo entertainment, entitled The False Alarm, and his success led him to become a public performer.

He travelled in 1827 through parts of England and France; in 1828, he came out at the Fishamble Street Theatre, Dublin; and in June 1829, he produced The Peregrinations of a Polyphonist, with which he visited the chief towns in England. In this, as in all his later entertainments, he was the sole performer; he represented various characters, making very rapid changes of dress while talking, singing, and displaying his remarkable powers of mimicry and ventriloquism.

He went to Scotland in 1830, where he brought out Love in a Labyrinth, or the Adventures of a Day, and in 1833, he opened at Oxford with a piece called Ignes Fatui.

In Lent 1834, he made his first appearance in London, and acted at the City of London Assembly Rooms, Bishopsgate Street, for several months. In September, he went to France and had his entertainments translated, delivering one half in French and the other in English.

In 1836, he appeared on alternate nights at the St James's Theatre and in the city.

In 1838, he visited the United States, the West Indies, and South America. Returning to England he played at the Strand Theatre, Almack's, Hanover Square Rooms, Store Street Music Hall, Philharmonic Rooms, Crosby Hall, and the Princess's Concert Rooms.

On 26 December 1854, he took possession of the Upper Hall, 69 Quadrant, Regent Street, London, where he produced the London Season, which was very successful.

The names of other entertainments produced by Love were:

- Love in All Shapes
- Love's Labour Lost
- A Voyage to Hamburg
- A Reminiscence of Bygone Times
- Love's Lucubrations
- Love's Mirror
- A Traveller's Reminiscences, by Charles Forrester
- A Christmas Party
- The Wolf in Sheep's Clothing, by H. Ball
- Dinner at Five Precisely

He played at the Regent Gallery on 8 February 1856, the 300th consecutive night, and this was stated to be his 2,406th performance in London.

In 1858, he was seized with permanent paralysis, when a benefit was organised for him at Sadler's Wells. He died at 33 Arundel Street, Strand, London, on 16 March 1867.
