= Evelyn Hellicar =

English architect (1862–1929)

Evelyn Hellicar (1862–1929) was an English architect.

== Biography ==
He was educated at Cranbrook School, Kent. He was articled to Thomas Graham Jackson in 1883; that same year Jackson had added a new chancel to Bromley Parish Church. Hellicar studied at University College London. He received the Donaldson Silver Medal in 1886-87 and the Roger Smith Prize for Construction.

He married Sophie Hildegarde Tate (1866–1957) at Trent, Dorset on 30 August 1894.

Hellicar died at Corner Cottage, Hambledon, Surrey on 22 July 1929.

== Career ==
Hellicar was a member of Royal Institute of British Architects from 1888 to 1928. Around 1889 he entered into a short lived partnership with Sydney Vacher at 35 Wellington Street, Strand, London. Together they exhibited a design for a post office in Hertford at the Royal Academy of Arts in 1890.

== Works ==
- 1887-88 17 and 19 Sundridge Avenue, Bromley
- 1889 Valley Primary School, Shortlands
- 1890 Bromley Parish Church, Church Road, Bromley (repairs)
- 1890s Cottages and lodges at Nether and Over Compton
- 1891 Duchess Memorial Cross for Louisa, Duchess of Northumberland, Albury, Surrey (photos at Albury History Society)
- 1892 Ralston, Bromley, Kent
- 1893-94 Bingham's Melcombe, Dorset (restorations)
- 1897 47-49 Rodway Road, Bromley
- 1904 Dalton Hill, Albury (dining room) (photo at Albury History Society)
- 1908 Backwell Down, Backwell Hill Road, Backwell, near Bristol
- 1908 Carnegie Library, High Street, Bromley, Kent
- 1912 Carnegie Library, High Street, Bromley, Kent (extension)
- 1913 St Mary's Church, Plaistow, Bromley, Kent (unexecuted scheme for tower)
- 1919 Cottages and Club House, Raheen, Co Clare, Ireland
- 1925 Music Room at Ripley, 24 Sundridge Avenue, Cantebury, Kent
- 1925 St John's Church, Roseacre Road, Welling, Kent

== Other works ==
- Four sketch books of buildings and construction detailing
