= Charles Robert Bell Keetley =

English physician

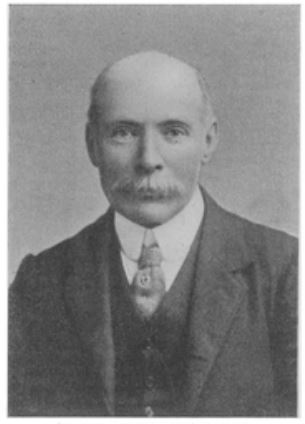
- Born: 13 September 1848; Grimsby, England
- Died: 4 December 1909 (aged 61); Brighton, England
- Occupation: Physician

Charles Robert Bell Keetley (13 September 1848 – 4 December 1909) was an English physician.

== Biography ==
Keetley was born on 13 September 1848 at Grimsby. He was the son of Robert Keetley by his wife (born Waterland). Both his father and mother came of a seafaring stock. His father, a shipbuilder and a mayor of Grimsby, fell into financial straits. The son, who was mainly brought up by his grandparents and by his uncle, T. B. Keetley, a medical practitioner of Grimsby, was educated at Browne's school there, and acted as ‘surgery help’ or unarticled apprentice to his uncle during the last years of his school life. He then attended the lectures on botany and anatomy at the Hull school of medicine. He entered St. Bartholomew's Hospital in 1871, matriculated at the London University, and in 1874 obtained the two gold medals at the intermediate examination in medicine, one for anatomy, the other for organic chemistry, materia medica, and pharmaceutical chemistry. He took no degree. He was admitted M.R.C.S. England, and F.R.C.S. in 1876. He became L.R.C.P. in 1873. After serving in 1875 as house-surgeon to the Queen's Hospital, Birmingham, and taking general practice at Bungay in Suffolk, he was from 1876 to 1878 an assistant demonstrator of anatomy in the medical school of St. Bartholomew's Hospital.

In 1878 he was elected assistant surgeon at the West London Hospital, and with this hospital he was associated until his death. During his thirty years' service, and mainly by his advice, the hospital grew from a small suburban venture into a great charity, to which was attached a postgraduate medical school of the first importance. At the outset Keetley introduced into the wards and operating theatre the antiseptic methods of modern surgery before they had been adopted to any great extent by the other hospitals in London. He advocated the operation of appendicotomy and wrote a valuable handbook on orthopædic surgery (London, 1900). In 1882 he was foremost in founding, and was the first president of, the West London Medico-Chirurgical Society. He also originated and organised with Mr. Herbert Chambers an army medical civilian reserve, which was afterwards merged into the territorial force as the Third London General Hospital corps.

A slight but incurable deafness and want of business aptitude hampered Keetley's professional success. A keen athlete in early life, he was well known as a football player, boxer, and oarsman; he was a skilful artist and caricaturist with pen and pencil, and had a gift for impromptu rhymes. He died on 4 December 1909 at Brighton, and was buried in Kensal Green cemetery.

He married Anna, daughter of Henry Holmes Long of the East India Company, but had no children.

Keetley, who was co-editor of the ‘Annals of Surgery,’ vols. i.–xiv. (London and New York, 1885–91), published:

- ‘The Student's Guide to the Medical Profession,’ 1878; 2nd edit. 1885.
- ‘An Index of Surgery,’ 1881; 4th edit. 1887.
- ‘Orthopædic Surgery; a Handbook,’ 1900.
- ‘Kallos. A Treatise on the Scientific Culture of Personal Beauty and the Cure of Ugliness,’ 1883; this work deals with the influence of Hellenic culture on the world's ideal of beauty, and in it Keetley anticipated some of the ideals of the later eugenics school.
