= Charles Vacher =

English painter

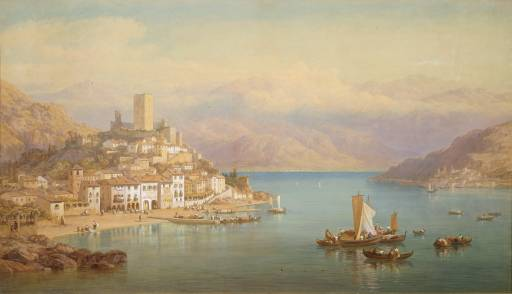
Rezzonico and the Splügen Range, Lake Como 1867

Charles Vacher (1818–1883) was a British painter in watercolours.

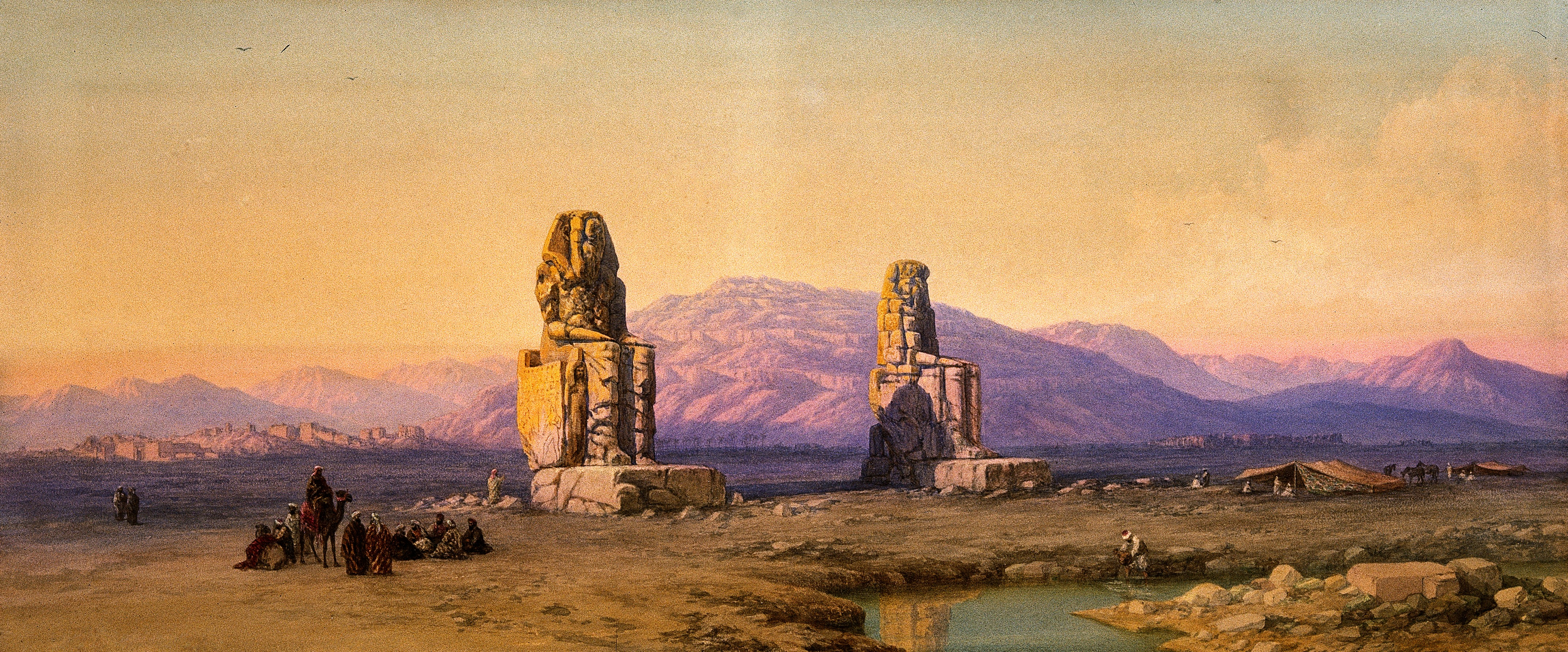
The statues of the Memnons. Watercolour by Charles Vacher.

== Life ==
He was the third son of the well-known stationer and bookseller, Thomas Vacher, of 29 Parliament Street, Westminster, where he was born on 22 June 1818. He studied art at the Royal Academy. Between 1839 and 1843 he pursued his studies in Rome.

Many tours followed, in which he visited Italy, Sicily, France, Germany, Algeria, and Egypt, making large numbers of sketches in all these countries. These sketches furnished him with materials for his numerous drawings, which were highly finished and had an excellence of composition and an abundance of interesting details that gave his works a considerable popularity. His speciality was Italian views, but Egyptian and some Algerian subjects were also sketched and painted. The marine painter Edward William Cooke visited his Italian studio in 1846.

He was a rapid worker, and, besides over two thousand sketches which he left at his death, he often executed twelve to sixteen finished works in one year, and between 1838 and 1881 he exhibited no fewer than 350 at the London exhibitions. His first exhibit at the Royal Academy was, in 1838, ‘Well at Bacharach on the Rhine,’ but the majority of his pictures — 324 works in all — were shown at the gallery of the New Society of Painters in Water Colours, now the Royal Institute of Painters in Watercolours, which he joined in 1846, on the introduction of his friend Louis Hague. His name first appears at the Royal Manchester Institution exhibition in 1842 as a contributor of six drawings, all of buildings in Italy. One of these, ‘Naples with Vesuvius,’ is probably that now in the South Kensington Museum. The British Museum possesses two fairly good examples of his work—‘View of City of Tombs, Cairo,’ 1863, and ‘View in the Forum, Rome’—and many others are in the possession of his widow.

Vacher married Jane Allan, daughter of James Mathewson Allan, on 16 July 1857. He died on 21 July 1883 at his residence, 4 The Boltons, West Brompton, of progressive cerebro-spinal paralysis. The couple had no children, his widow Jane and his nephews became executors of the £45,000 left in his will, a remarkable sum for a painter. His unsold works were auctioned by Christies on 21 February 1884. He was buried at Kensal Green cemetery. A portrait in watercolour, painted by himself, belonged to his widow, who also possessed a portrait painted in oil by Thomas Harwood (a watercolour painter) in Rome. Vacher's elder brother, George, owned a portrait of him in oil which was executed in 1850 by William Denholm Kennedy.

He is buried at Kensal Green Cemetery.

The Victoria and Albert, Portsmouth City, and British Museums contain works by the artist, as do the Glasgow and Grundy Art Galleries.
