= Robert Fellowes (philanthropist) =

English clergyman, journalist and philanthropist

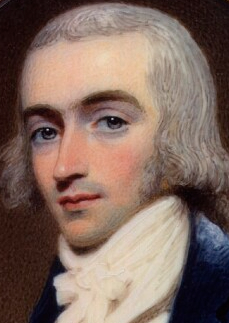
- Portrait detail of Robert Fellowes
- Born: 1771
- Died: 1847 (aged 75–76)
- Occupation(s): cleric, journal editor, philanthropist
- Title: The Reverend

Robert Fellowes, LL.D. (1771 – 6 February 1847) was an English clergyman, journalist and philanthropist.

== Life ==
His father William Fellowes of Danbury was the eldest son of William Fellowes of Shotesham Park, Norfolk. After attending Felsted School in Essex Fellowes was educated for the church. He matriculated at Oriel College, Oxford in 1788, graduating B.A. at St Mary Hall, where he graduated BA on 30 June 1796, and an MA on 28 January 1801.

Fellowes took orders, but seems to have held no preferment. For over six years (1804–11) he edited The Critical Review. He was a close friend of Samuel Parr, who introduced him to the embattled Queen Caroline of Brunswick, whose cause he supported. He is said to have written all her replies to the numerous addresses presented to her in 1820. On the other hand, the positions as the Queen's chaplain and private secretary may have been taken by John Page Wood at some point in 1819.

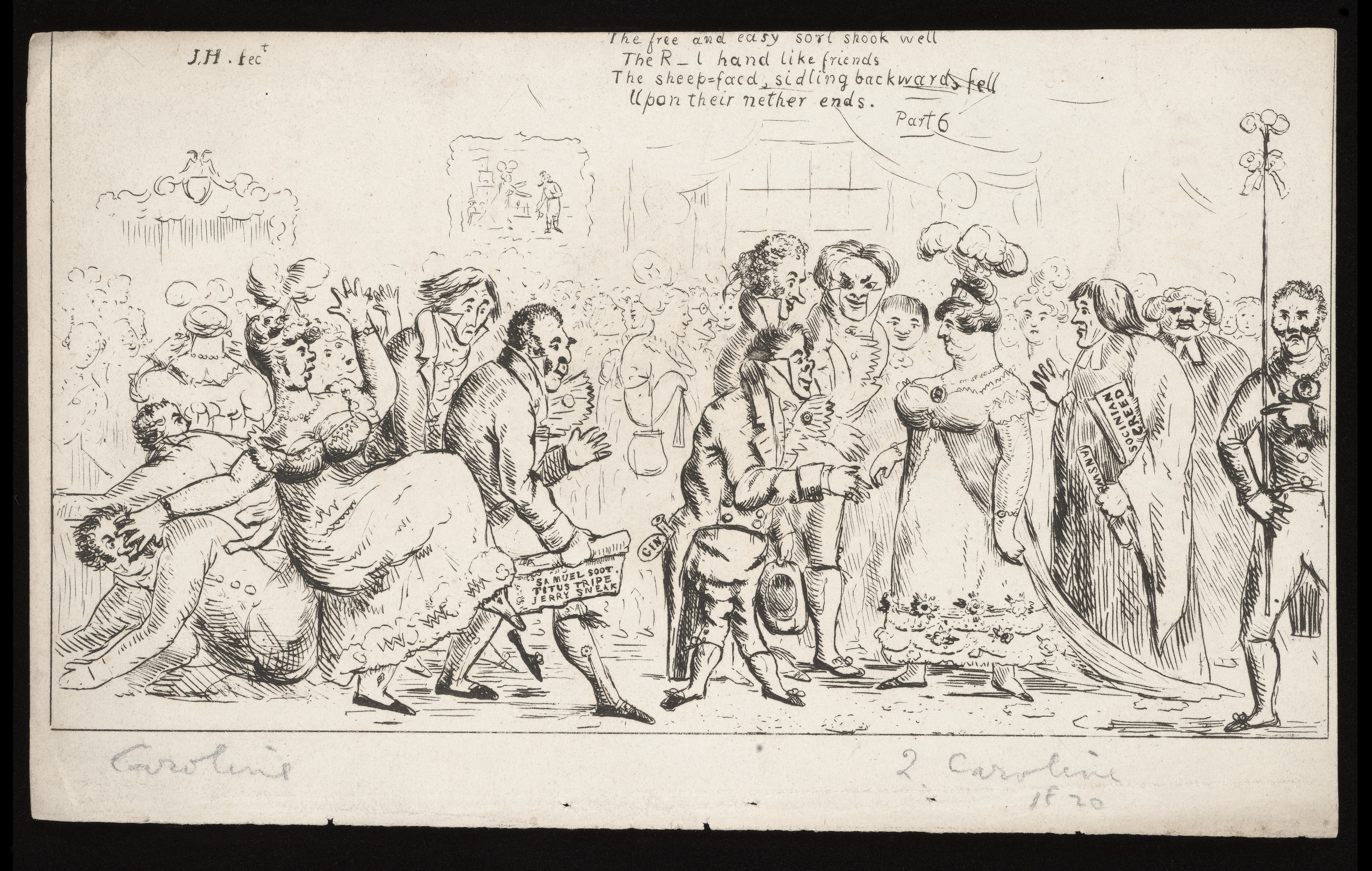
Queen Caroline, wife of King George IV, is greeted by people from Marylebone, caricature by Theodore Edward Hook, in which the Rev. Robert Fellowes stands to the right of the Queen, with a scroll "Socinian Creed" – the figure on the right edge of the drawing is Matthew Wood

Francis Maseres left Fellowes at his death in 1824 nearly £200,000. Fellowes erected to the memory of Maseres a monument in Reigate churchyard, with a eulogistic inscription in Latin. He used this fortune in aiding private distress and in forwarding benevolent schemes. In 1826 he gave benefactions to encourage the study of natural philosophy at the University of Edinburgh. He was one of the promoters of London University. Out of gratitude for the professional services of Dr John Elliotson, who held a chair of medicine at University College London he provided there two annual gold medals, the Fellowes Medals, for proficiency in clinical medicine.

Fellowes interested himself in the opening of Regent's Park to the public, and in the emancipation of the Jews. He was an advanced liberal in politics, but drew the line at universal suffrage. In 1828 he purchased The Examiner and made Albany Fonblanque editor. He lectured at the opening of the chapel of the Beaumont Philosophical Institution.

Fellowes died in Dorset Square on 6 February 1847, leaving family. He was buried at Kensal Green on 13 February.

== Works ==
A list of Fellowes's publications is given in the Gentleman's Magazine. They include:

- A Picture of Christian Philosophy, or … Illustration of the Character of Jesus, 1798; 2nd ed. 1799; 3rd ed. 1800; 4th ed. with supplement, 1803.
- An Address to the People, &c., 1799.
- Morality united with Policy, &c., 1800.
- The Rights of Property Vindicated, &c., 1818.
- Poems, … Original and Translated, &c., 1806 (many of the translations are from Gesner).

His religious publications advocated practical philanthropy. By degrees he abandoned the distinctive Anglican tenets, and in his work The Religion of the Universe, he aimed to divest religion of most of its supernatural elements. Major writings were:

- The Anti-Calvinist, Warwick, 1800; 2nd ed. London, 1801.
- Religion without Cant, &c., 1801.
- The Guide to Immortality, &c., 1804, 3 vols. (a digest of the four gospels).
- A Body of Theology, &c., 1807.
- The Religion of the Universe, &c., 1836; 3rd ed. Lond. and Edinb. 1864, (with additions from his manuscripts).
- A Lecture delivered on Opening the Chapel … in Beaumont Square, 1841.
- Common-sense Truths, &c., 1844.

Fellowes translated from the Latin John Milton's Familiar Epistles and Second Defence of the People of England for an 1806 edition. Some of his publications were issued under the pseudonym Philalethes A.M. Oxon.

== Family ==
Fellowes married twice:

1. Firstly, in 1806 to Elizabeth Annabella Mackenzie, daughter of Eneas Mackenzie. She translated works of Johann Georg Sulzer from German, and died in 1814. She had previously been married to M. de Brusasque, and her translations were published in 1806 as Illustrations of the Theory and Principles of Taste, from the German of Sulzer, by Elizabeth Annabella de Brusasque. There were four daughters of the marriage, of whom Anna, the eldest (1807–1872) married in 1833 John Charles Burrow.
2. Secondly, to Sophia Parmenter (1793–1836), daughter of John Parmenter of Castle Hedingham. There were two daughters and two sons of the marriage. Of the daughters, Frances Maseres (1824–1888) married in 1852 Robert William Mackay the freethinker; and Sophia Maseres (1825–1887) married in 1849 John Henry Haycraft of Clifton. Robert Maseres Fellowes (1827–1909) married in 1878 Elizabeth Jacobs, and was father of two sons and two daughters; and William Maseres Fellowes (1829–1877) died unmarried.
