= Kensal Green Cemetery =

Cemetery in London, England

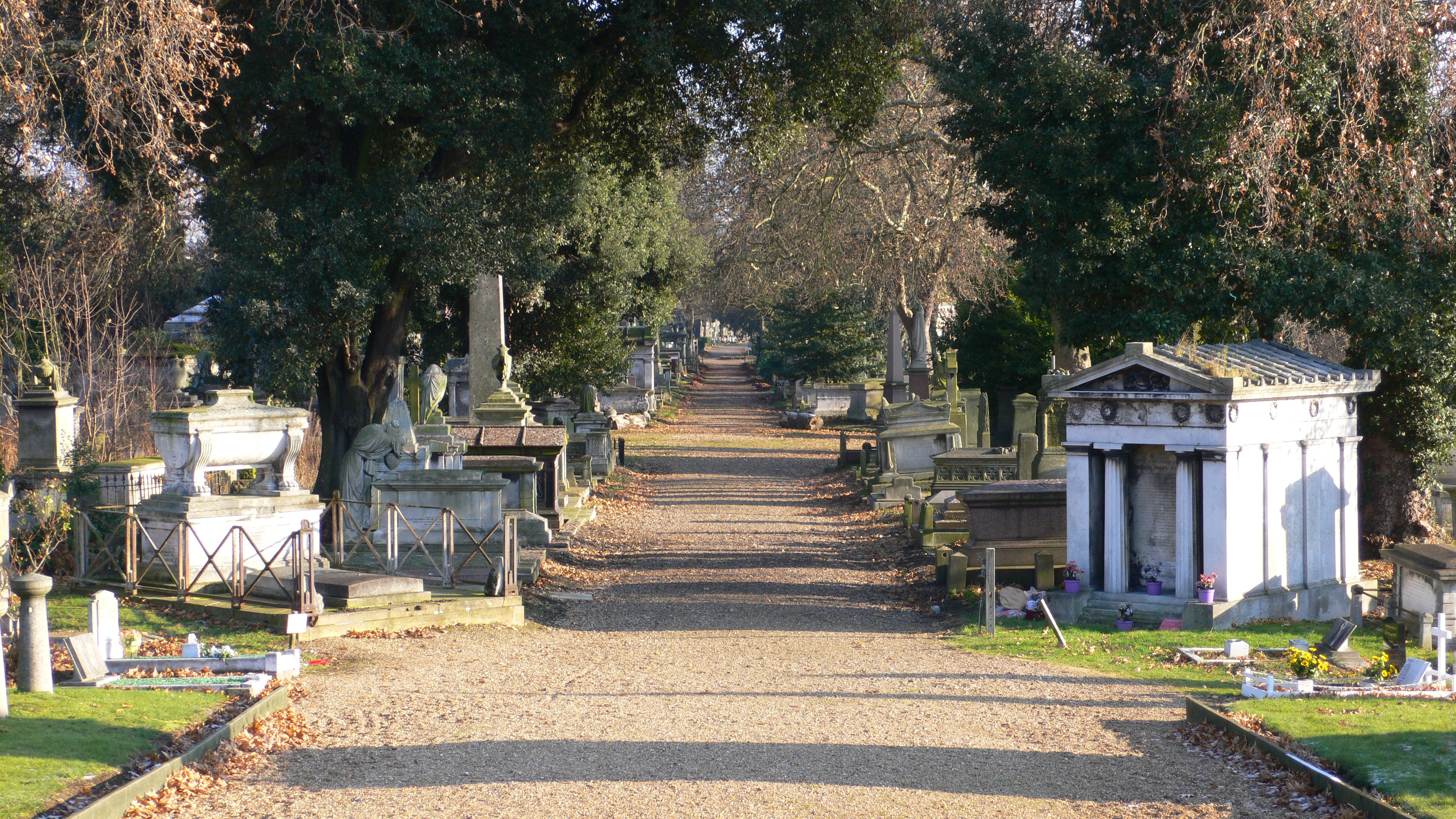
- Interactive map of Kensal Green Cemetery

Details
- Established: 1833; 193 years ago
- Location: Harrow Road, North Kensington, London
- Country: England
- Coordinates: 51.5286°N 0.2241°W
- Type: Private
- Style: Neoclassical
- Owned by: The General Cemetery Company
- Size: 29 hectares (72 acres)
- No. of graves: 65,000+
- No. of interments: 250,000
- Website: The General Cemetery Company website

National Register of Historic Parks and Gardens
- Official name: Kensal Green Cemetery
- Designated: 1 October 1987
- Reference no.: 1000817

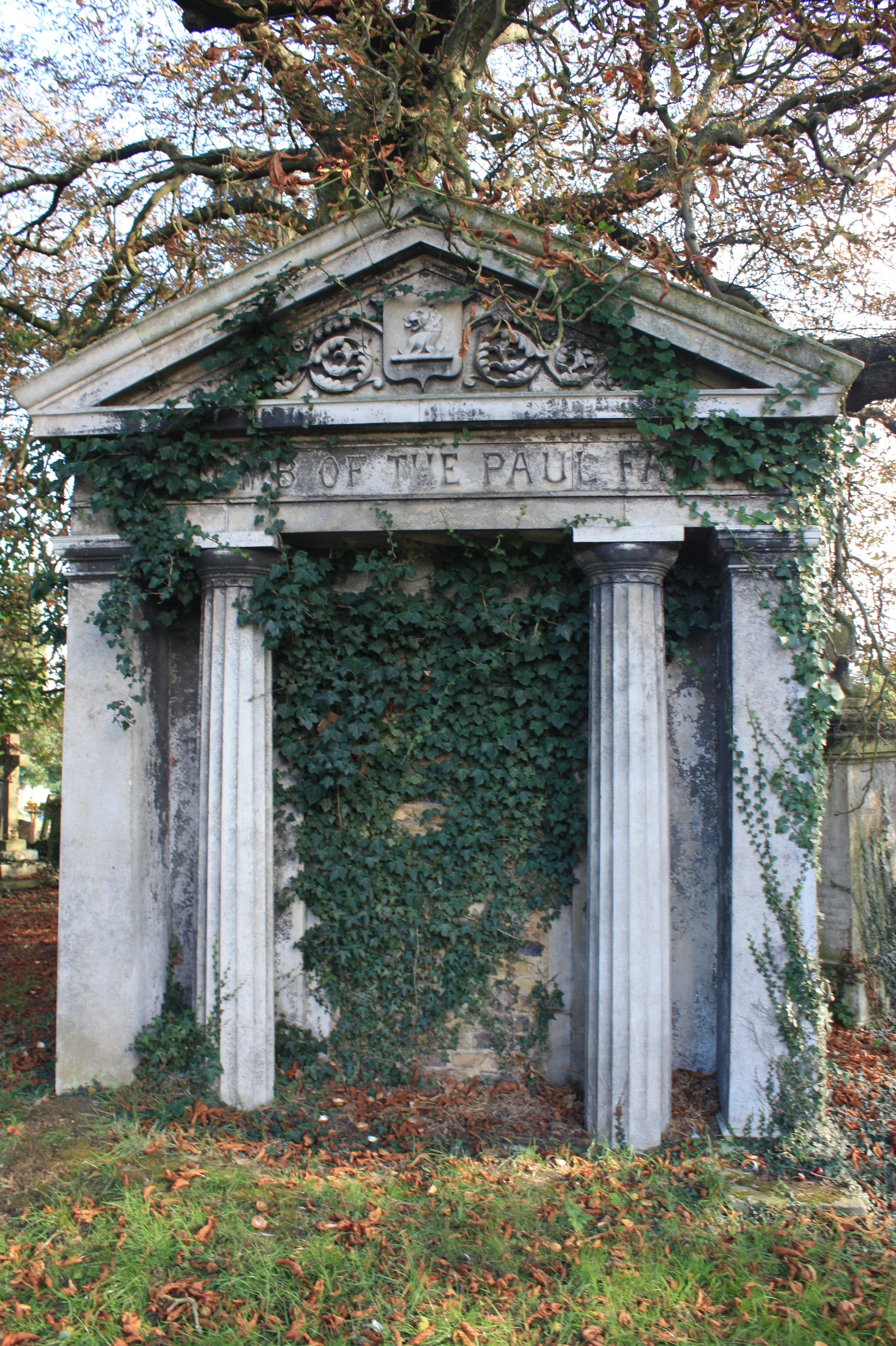
A typical mausoleum, that of Sir John Dean Paul

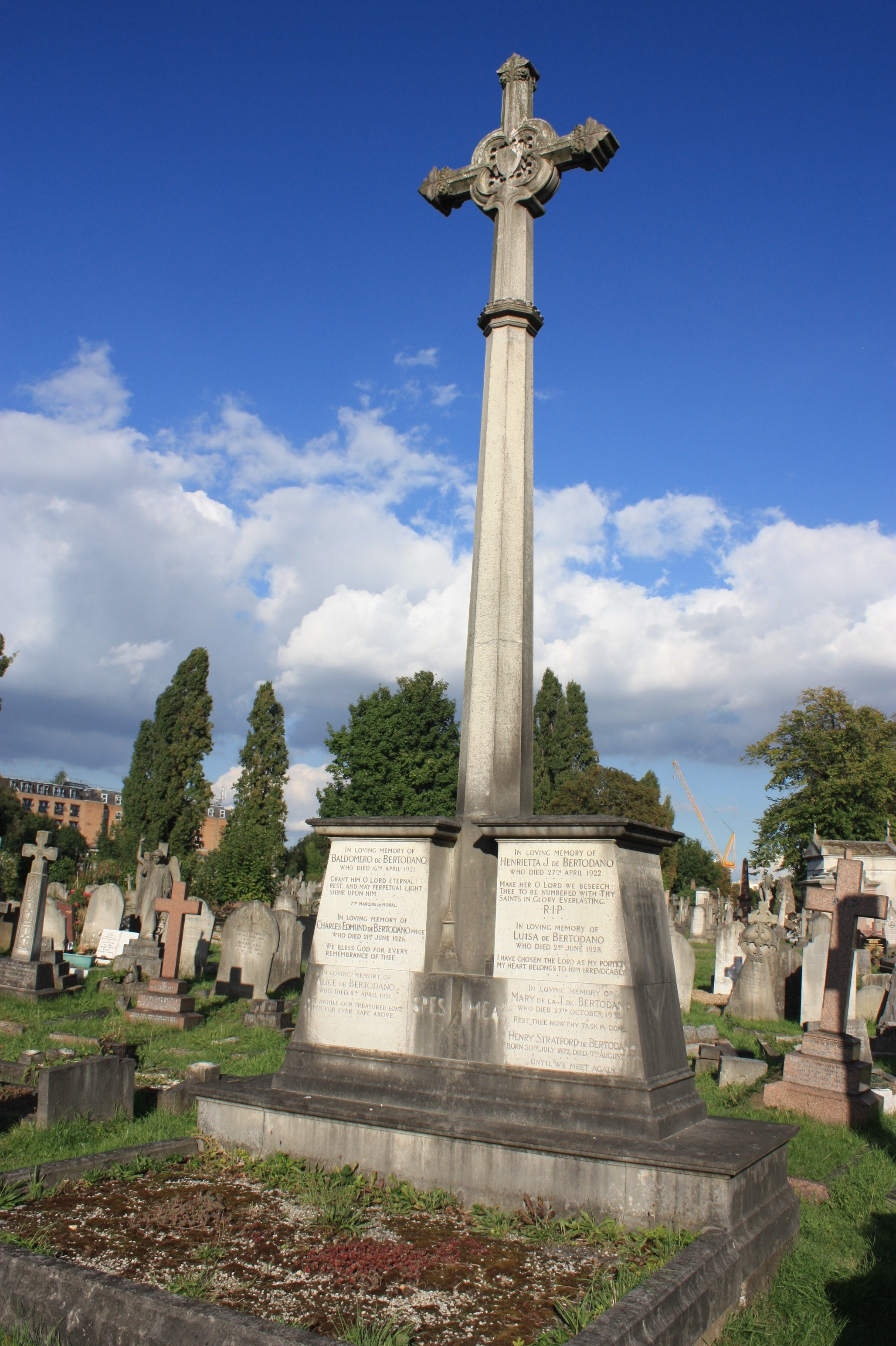
Grave of Baldomero de Bertodano

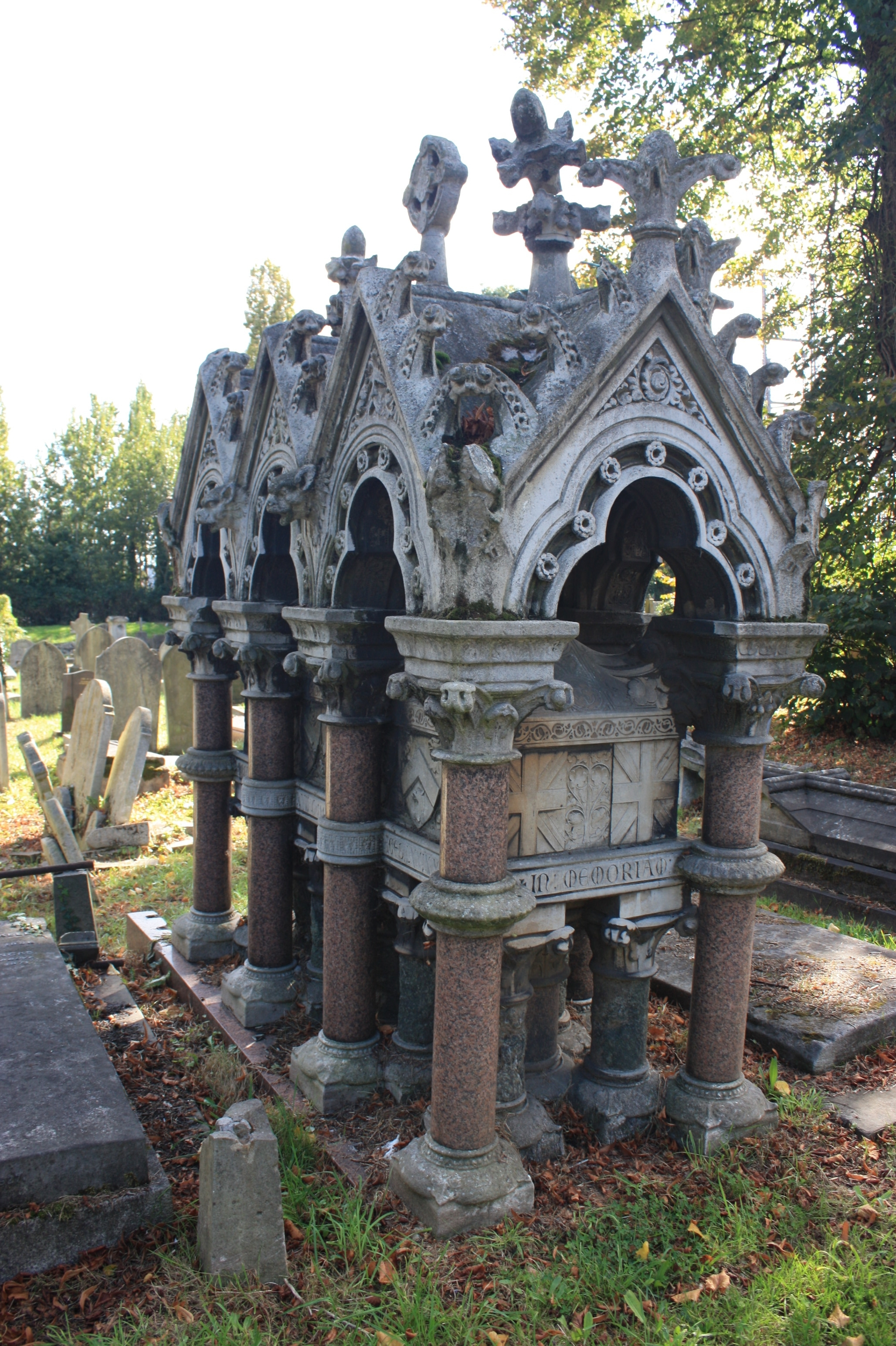
Tomb of Charles Spencer Ricketts

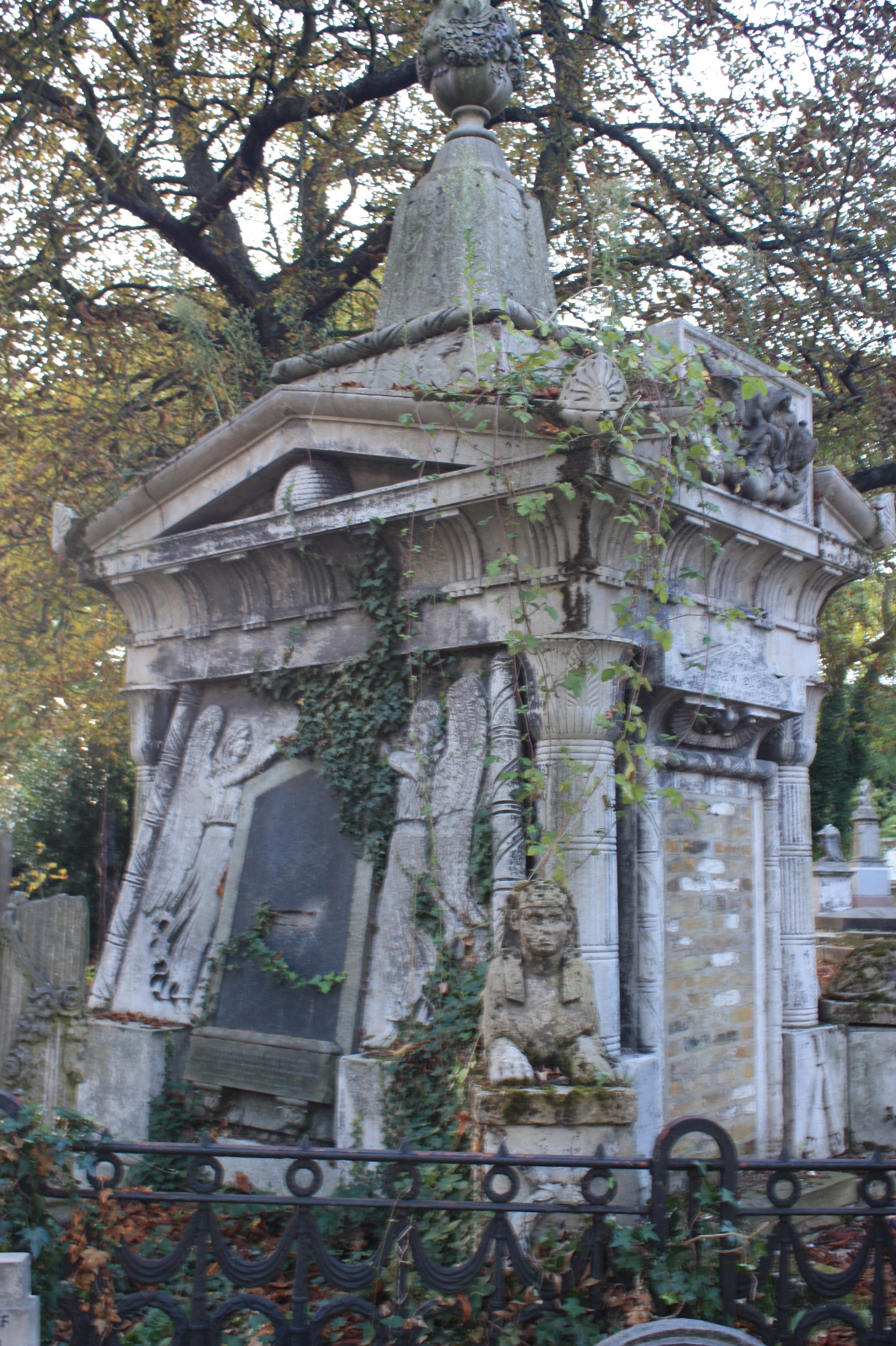
Andrew Ducrow's monument

Kensal Green Cemetery is a cemetery in the Kensal Green area of North Kensington in the Royal Borough of Kensington and Chelsea and the London Borough of Hammersmith and Fulham in London, England. Inspired by Père Lachaise Cemetery in Paris, it was founded by the barrister George Frederick Carden. The cemetery opened in 1833 and comprises 72 acres (29 ha) of grounds, including two conservation areas, adjoining a canal. The cemetery is home to at least 33 species of bird and other wildlife. This distinctive garden cemetery has memorials ranging from large mausoleums housing the rich and famous to many distinctive smaller graves and includes special areas dedicated to the very young. It has three chapels and serves all faiths. It is one of the Magnificent Seven cemeteries in London.

The cemetery was immortalised in the lines of G. K. Chesterton's poem "The Rolling English Road" from his book The Flying Inn:

For there is good news yet to hear and fine things to be seen;
Before we go to Paradise by way of Kensal Green.

Despite its Grecian-style buildings, the cemetery is primarily Gothic in character, due to the high number of private Gothic monuments. Due to this atmosphere, the cemetery was the chosen location of several scenes in movies, notably in Theatre of Blood.

The cemetery is listed Grade I on the Register of Historic Parks and Gardens. It remains in use.

== Location ==
The cemetery is in both the London Borough of Hammersmith and Fulham and the Royal Borough of Kensington and Chelsea in west London. Its main entrance is on Harrow Road (west of where Ladbroke Grove and Chamberlayne Road meet). Its other entrance, Alma Place (the West Gate, almost opposite Greyhound Road) is also on the north side. Alma Place leads to the West London Crematorium (whose owner and operator is the same) and St. Mary's Roman Catholic Cemetery, which are in the London Borough of Hammersmith and Fulham. The cemetery lies between Harrow Road and the Paddington Arm of the Grand Union Canal to the south which has long been separated by a wall.

A set of defunct gates is set in the southern wall which adjoins the canal where barges took a proportion of earth from excavating graves and occasionally coffins carried by barge were unloaded.

== History and description ==
=== Establishment and design ===
George Frederick Carden had failed with an earlier attempt to establish a British equivalent to Paris's Père Lachaise Cemetery in 1825, but a new committee established in February 1830, including Andrew Spottiswoode, MP for Saltash, sculptor Robert William Sievier, banker Sir John Dean Paul, Charles Broughton Bowman (first committee secretary), and architects Thomas Willson (who had previously proposed an ambitious Metropolitan Sepulchre project) and Augustus Charles Pugin, gained more financial, political and public support to fund the "General Cemetery Company". Public meetings were held in June and July 1830 at the Freemasons' Tavern, and George Carden was elected treasurer.

Paul, a partner in the London banking firm of Strahan, Paul, Paul and Bates, found and conditionally purchased the 54 acres (22 ha) of land at Kensal Green for £9,500. Paul and Carden were already embroiled in a dispute regarding the design of the cemetery, where Paul favoured the Grecian style and Carden the Gothic style. A succession of architects were contemplated, including Benjamin Wyatt (who declined), Charles Fowler (proposal not taken up), Francis Goodwin, Willson, and a Mr Lidell, a pupil of John Nash, before an architectural competition was launched in November 1831. This attracted 46 entrants, and in March 1832 the premium was awarded, despite some opposition, for a Gothic Revival design by Henry Edward Kendall; this decision was eventually overturned.

Metropolitan General Cemetery Act 1832
- Act of Parliament
- Parliament of the United Kingdom
- Long title: An Act for establishing a General Cemetery for the Interment of the Dead in the Neighbourhood of the Metropolis.
- Citation: 2 & 3 Will. 4. c. cx
- Introduced by: Metropolitan General Cemetery Act 1832 (Commons)

Dates
- Royal assent: 11 July 1832

Text of statute as originally enacted

On 11 July 1832, the Metropolitan General Cemetery Act 1832 (2 & 3 Will. 4. c. cx) establishing a "General Cemetery Company for the interment of the Dead in the Neighbourhood of the Metropolis" gained royal assent. The act authorised it to raise up to £45,000 in shares, buy up to 80 acres of land and build a cemetery and a Church of England chapel. Company directors appointed after the bill received royal assent asserted their control and preference for a different style. One of the competition judges and a company shareholder, John Griffith of Finbury, who had previously produced working drawings for a boundary wall, ultimately designed the cemetery's two chapels and the main gateway and 15,000 trees were supplied and planted by Hugh Ronalds from his nursery in Brentford. Founded as the General Cemetery of All Souls, Kensal Green, the cemetery was the first of the "Magnificent Seven" garden-style cemeteries in London. It was consecrated on 24 January 1833 by Charles James Blomfield, the Bishop of London, receiving its first funeral the same month.

In the early 1850s, after a series of cholera epidemics in London caused an examination of London's burial facilities, health commissioner Edwin Chadwick proposed the closure of all existing burial grounds in the vicinity of London other than the privately owned Kensal Green Cemetery, north-west of the city, which was to be nationalised and greatly enlarged to provide a single burial ground for west London. (A large tract of land on the Thames around 9 miles (14 km) south-east of London in Abbey Wood was to become a single burial ground for east London.) The Treasury was sceptical that Chadwick's scheme would ever be financially viable, and it was widely unpopular. Although the Metropolitan Interments Act 1850 (13 & 14 Vict. c. 52) authorised the scheme, it was abandoned in 1852.

Some of the cemetery's outer wall, bordering the Harrow Road, collapsed in 2006. While some was rebuilt, owing to issues with contractors, financial difficulties, planning delays, and structural concerns (among other factors) it has still not yet been completed, so some of the outer wall only exists as temporary corrugated iron fence.

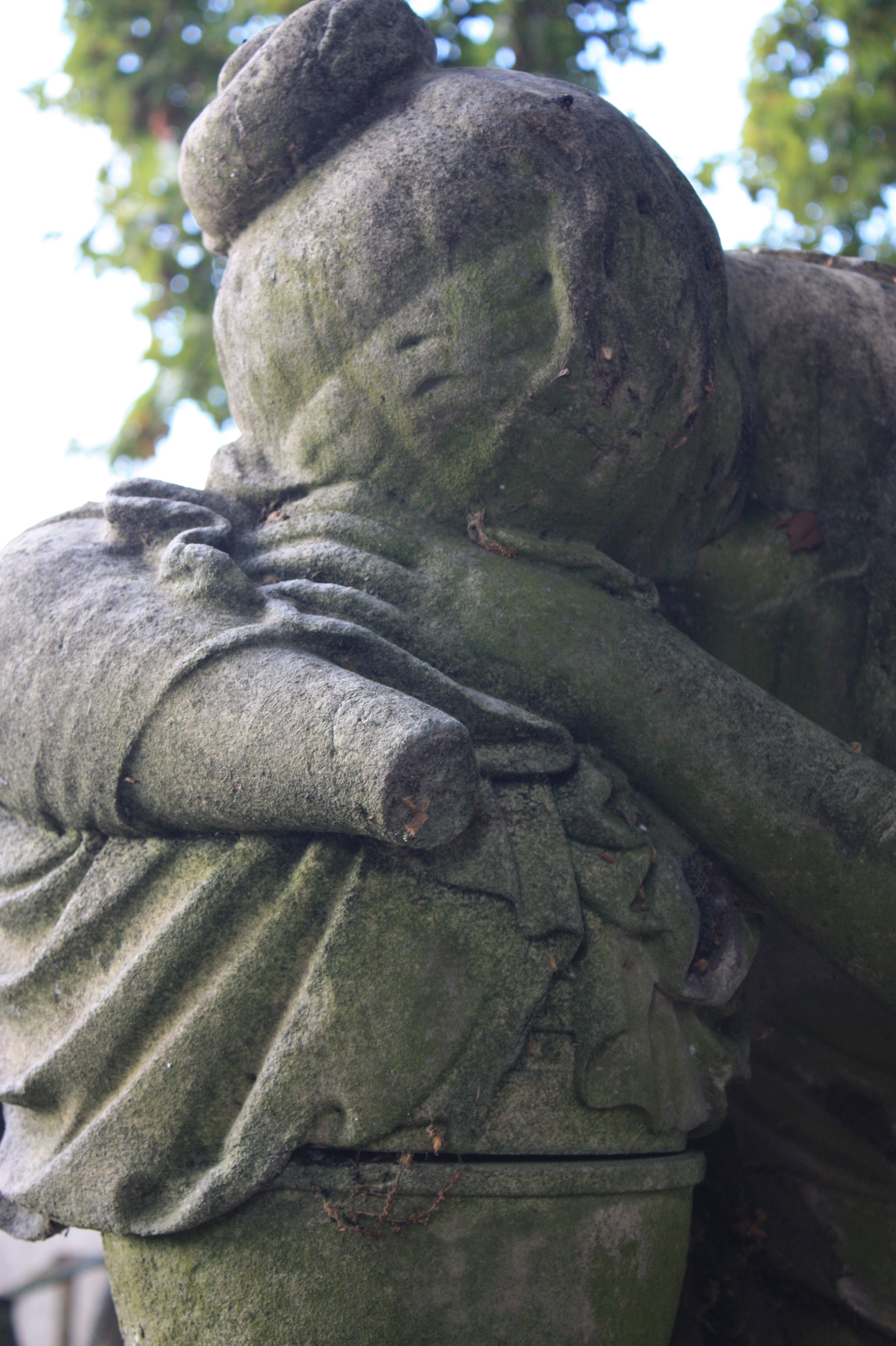
A typical statuary detail

=== Layout ===
The overall layout is on an east–west axis, with a central path leading to a raised chapel toward the west. The entrance is to the north-east and the largest monuments line the central path to the chapel.

The Church of England was allotted 39 acres and the remaining 15, clearly separated, acres were given over to Dissenters, a distinction deemed crucial at the time. Originally there was a division between the Dissenters' part of the cemetery and the Anglican section. This took the form of a "sunk fence" from the canal to the gate piers on the path. There were also decorative iron gates. The small area designated for non-Anglican burials is approximately oval in shape and was formerly made prominent by a wider central axis path that terminated with the neo-classical chapel with curved colonnades. The Anglican Chapel dominates the western section of the cemetery, being raised on a terrace beneath that is an extensive catacomb; there is a hydraulic catafalque for lowering coffins into the catacomb.

It is still in operation today; burials and cremations take place daily, although cremations are now more common than interments. The cemetery is still run by the General Cemetery Company under its original act of Parliament. This mandates that bodies there may not be exhumed and cremated or the land sold for development. Once the cemetery has exhausted all its interment space and can no longer function as a cemetery, the mandate requires that it shall remain a memorial park. The General Cemetery Company constructed and runs the West London Crematorium within the grounds of the cemetery.

While borrowing from the ideals established at Père Lachaise some years before, Kensal Green Cemetery contributed to the design and management basis for many cemetery projects throughout the British Empire of the time. In Australia, for example, the Necropolis at Rookwood (1868) and Waverley Cemetery (1877), both in Sydney, are noted for their use of the "gardenesque" landscape qualities and importantly self-sustaining management structures championed by the General Cemetery Company.

The cemetery is the burial site of approximately 250,000 individuals in over 65,000 graves, including upward of 500 members of the British nobility and 970 people listed in the Dictionary of National Biography. Many monuments, particularly the larger ones, lean precariously as they have settled over time on the underlying London clay.

== Notable structures ==
Many buildings and structures within Kensal Green are listed.

The Anglican Chapel is listed Grade I, while the Dissenters' Chapel, Kensal Green is listed Grade II* and the colonnade/catacomb and perimeter walls and railings are listed Grade II. Of the many tombs, memorials and mausoleums, eight are listed Grade II*, while The Reformers' Memorial is listed Grade II. The Tomb of Charles Spencer Ricketts is listed Grade II* and was designed by William Burges.

=== Anglican Chapel ===
The Anglican Chapel is at the centre of the cemetery, and contains several tombs. The chapel was damaged during the Second World War but was restored in 1954. Under the chapel is a catacomb, one of the few in London. The catacomb is currently not maintained but can be visited as part of a guided tour. It still has a working coffin-lift or catafalque, restored by The Friends of Kensal Green Cemetery in 1997.

=== Dissenters' Chapel ===
Situated in the eastern corner of the cemetery this Greek Revival structure was for the use of all non-Anglican denominations and of non-believers. Only part of the cemetery was consecrated, and Dissenters could opt to be buried in the non-consecrated areas following a service here. The cemetery became favoured by nonconformists, free-thinkers, non-Christians and atheists, and thus this chapel became popular. The Dissenters' Chapel had become derelict and partly roofless, so in 1995 was leased to the Historic Chapels Trust who undertook £447,000 of restoration. The chapel currently serves as the office of The Friends of Kensal Green Cemetery, but is also available for funeral services.

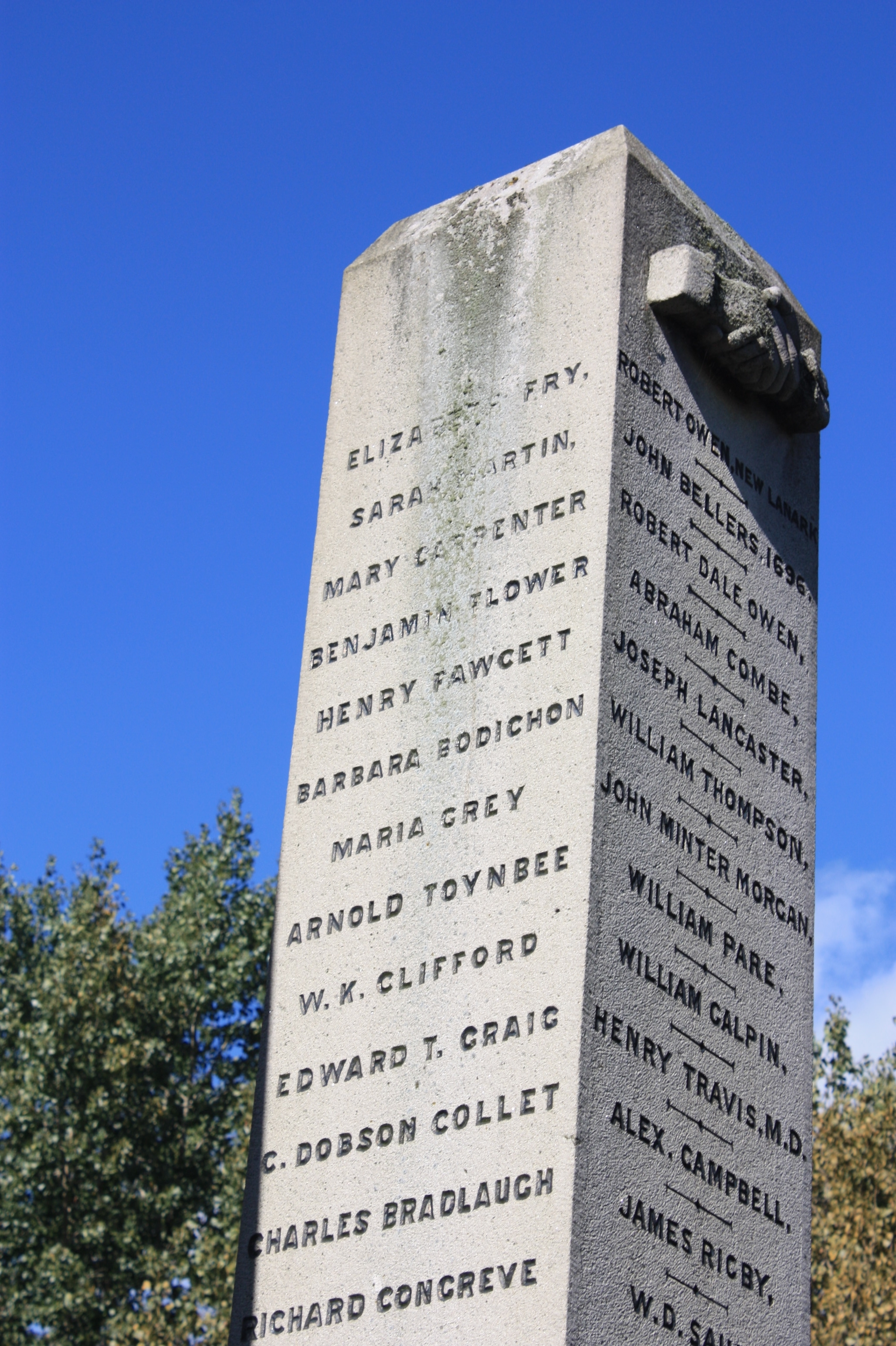
Detail of the Reformers' Memorial

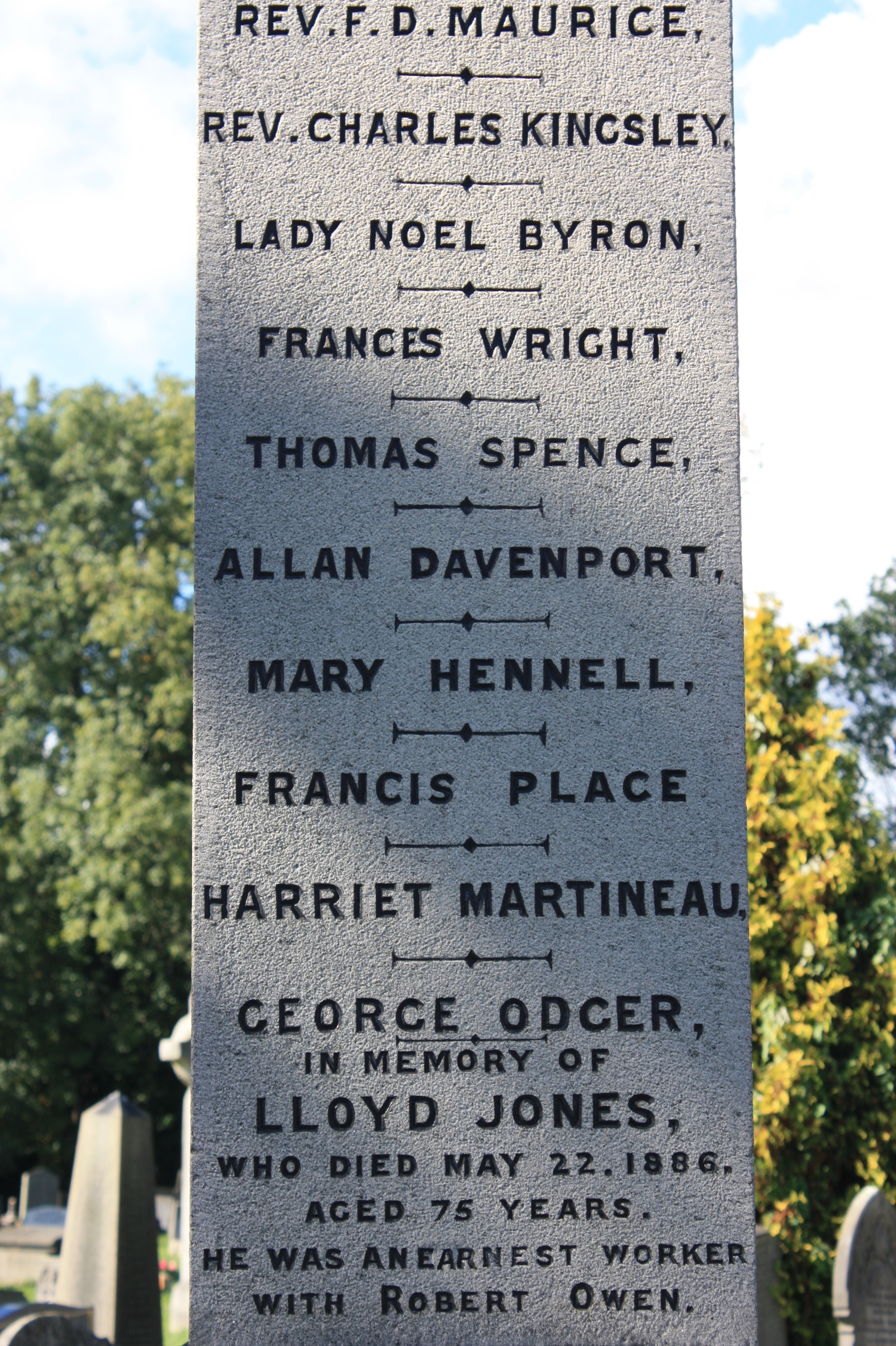
Base of one side of the Reformers’ Memorial

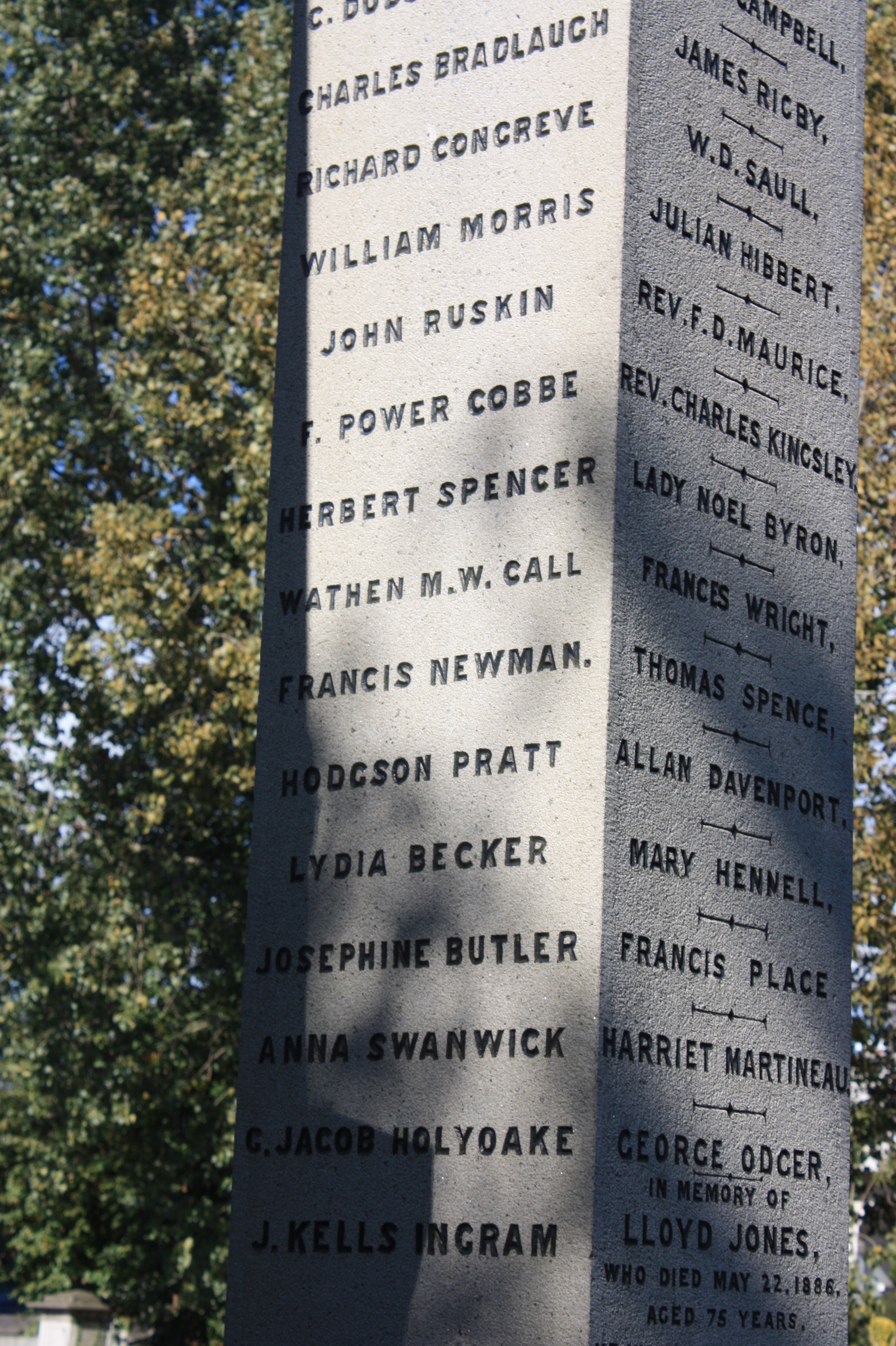
Lower section of the Reformers’ memorial

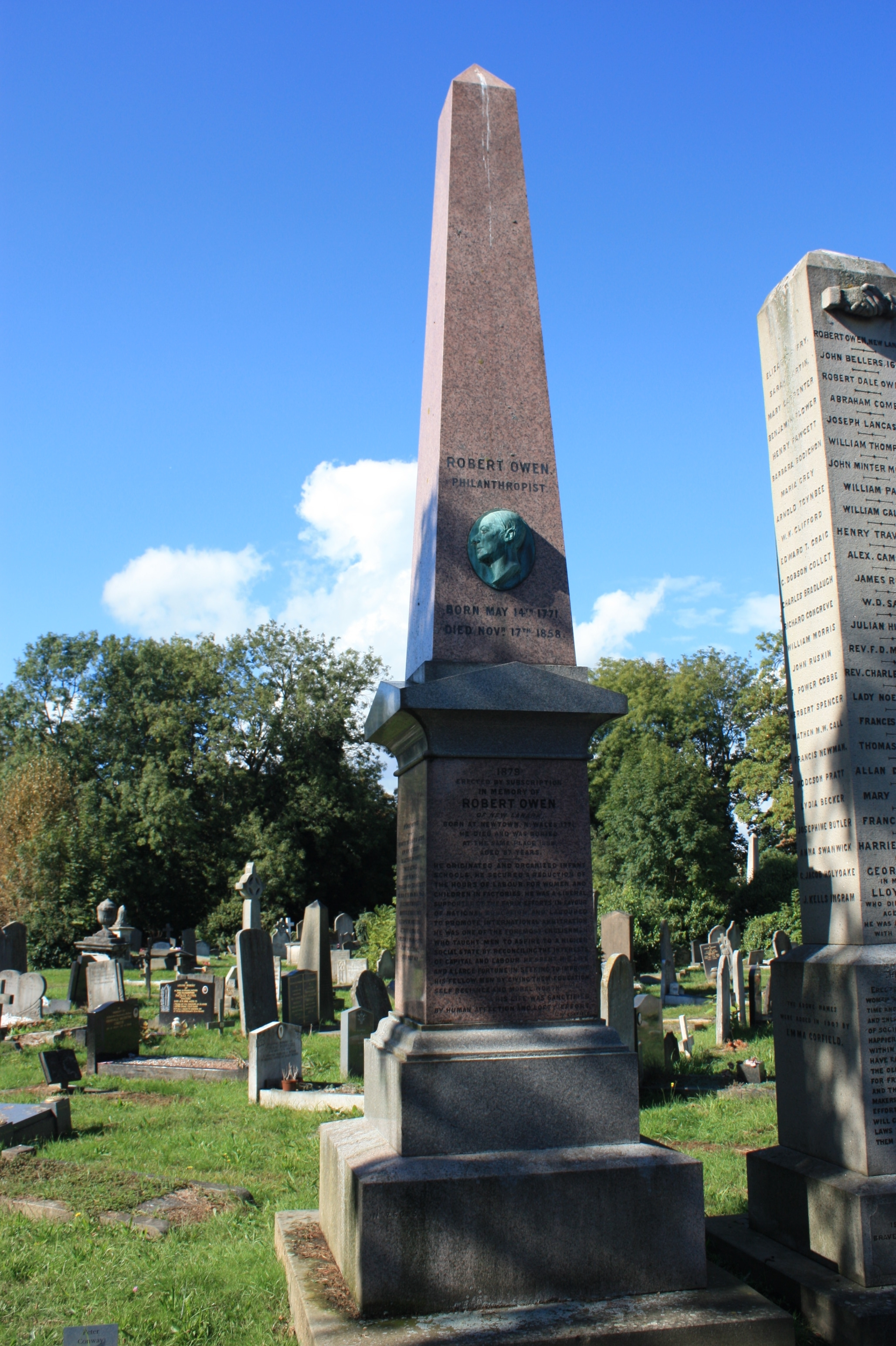
Robert Owen memorial (with the Reformers' Memorial to the right)

=== Reformers' Memorial ===
The Reformers' Memorial was erected in 1885. It was erected at the instigation of Joseph Corfield "to the memory of men and women who have generously given their time and means to improve the conditions and enlarge the happiness of all classes of society". The monument has lists of names of reformers and radicals on its north and east sides (together with further names added in 1907 by Emma Corfield). It is paired with the Robert Owen memorial, and a second instance of a non-funerary memorial in the cemetery's nonconformist section.

The memorial was amended to include Lloyd Jones to recognise his contribution.

THIS MEMORIAL
IS RAISED AS A TOKEN OF REGARD TO THE
BRAVE MEN AND WOMEN WHOSE NAMES IT BEARS BY JOSEPH W. CORFIELD,
AUGUST 1895.

THE REFORMERS' MEMORIAL
ERECTED TO THE GLORY OF MEN AND WOMEN WHO HAVE GENEROUSLY GIVEN THEIR TIME AND MEANS TO IMPROVE THE CONDITIONS AND ENHANCE THE HAPPINESS OF ALL CLASSES OF SOCIETY. THEY HAVE FELT THAT A FAR HAPPIER AND MORE PROSPEROUS LIFE IS WITHIN THE REACH OF ALL MEN, AND THEY HAVE EARNESTLY SOUGHT TO REALIZE IT. THE OLD BRUTAL LAWS OF IMPRISONMENT FOR FREE PRINTING HAVE BEEN SWEPT AWAY AND THE RIGHT OF SELECTING OUR OWN LAW MAKERS HAS BEEN GAINED MAINLY BY THEIR EFFORTS. THE EXERCISE OF THESE RIGHTS WILL GIVE THE PEOPLE AN INTEREST IN THE LAWS THAT GOVERN THEM, AND WILL MAKE THEM BETTER MEN AND BETTER CITIZENS.

The names of over seventy people are inscribed on the monument. These are, in order shown on the monument:

- FRONT FACE (EAST): Robert Owen (New Lanark), John Bellers, Robert Dale Owen, Abraham Combe, Joseph Lancaster, William Thompson, John Minter Morgan, William Pare, William Galpin, Henry Travis MD, Alex Campbell, James Rigby, W. D. Saull, Julian Hibbert, Rev. Charles Kingsley, Lady Noel Byron, Frances Wright, Thomas Spence, Allan Davenport, Mary Hennell, Francis Place, Harriet Martineau, George Odger, Lloyd Jones
- SOUTH FACE: Elizabeth Fry, Sarah Martin, Mary Carpenter, Benjamin Flower, Henry Fawcett, Barbara Bodichon, Maria Grey, Arnold Toynbee, W. K. Clifford, Edward T. Craig, C. Dobson Collet, Charles Bradlaugh, Richard Congreve, William Morris, John Ruskin, F. Power Cobbe, Herbert Spencer, Wathen M.W. Call, Francis Newman, Hodgson Pratt, Lydia Becker, Josephine Butler, Anna Swanwick, C. Jacob Holyoake, J. Kells Ingram
- NORTH FACE: Joseph Priestley, Thomas Paine, William Hone, John Stuart Mill, Major Cartwright, Richard Carlile, William Lovett, William Carpenter, Henry Hetherington, John Frost, William Cobbett, W. J. Fox, Richard Moore, William Howitt, Samuel Bamford, Henry Hunt, George Thompson, David Williams, Thomas Wooller, Ebenezer Elliott, Ernest Jones, Alex Macdonald, Richard Cobden, Robert Cooper.

The entry for Robert Owen reads:

The cenotaph to Robert Owen, who was buried in Newtown, Montgomeryshire, Wales, is fittingly at the side of the Reformers' Memorial.

ROBERT OWEN
PHILANTHROPIST
BORN MAY 14TH. 1771.
DIED NOVR. 17TH. 1858.

1879
ERECTED BY SUBSCRIPTION
IN MEMORY OF
ROBERT OWEN
OF NEW LANARK,
BORN AT NEWTOWN, N. WALES 1771.
HE DIED AND WAS BURIED
AT THE SAME PLACE 1858,
AGED 87 YEARS.

HE ORIGINATED AND ORGANIZED INFANT SCHOOLS, HE SECURED A REDUCTION OF THE HOURS OF LABOUR FOR WOMEN AND CHILDREN IN FACTORIES. HE WAS A LIBERAL SUPPORTER OF THE EARLY EFFORTS IN FAVOUR OF NATIONAL EDUCATION AND LABOURED TO PROMOTE INTERNATIONAL ARBITRATION. HE WAS ONE OF THE FOREMOST ENGLISHMEN [sic] WHO TAUGHT MEN TO ASPIRE TO A HIGHER SOCIAL STATE BY RECONCILING THE INTERESTS OF CAPITAL AND LABOUR. HE SPENT HIS LIFE AND A LARGE FORTUNE IN SEEKING TO IMPROVE HIS FELLOW MEN BY GIVING THEM EDUCATION, SELF-RELIANCE AND MORE WORTH.

HIS LIFE WAS SANCTIFIED BY HUMAN AFFECTION AND LOFTY EFFORT.

J. W. CORFIELD

MR. OWEN'S WRITINGS

REPORT TO THE COUNTY OF LANARK.
NEW VIEWS OF SOCIETY.
TWELVE LECTURES.
LECTURES ON MARRIAGE.
LECTURES ON A NEW STATE OF SOCIETY.
THE BOOK OF THE NEW MORAL WORLD.
SIX LECTURES AT MANCHESTER.
MANIFESTO OF ROBERT OWEN.
SELF SUPPORTING HOME COLONIES.
LETTERS TO THE HUMAN RACE.
REVOLUTION IN MIND AND PRACTICE.
ROBERT OWEN'S JOURNAL.
LIFE OF ROBERT OWEN.

The memorial is listed as grade II.

== Catacombs ==
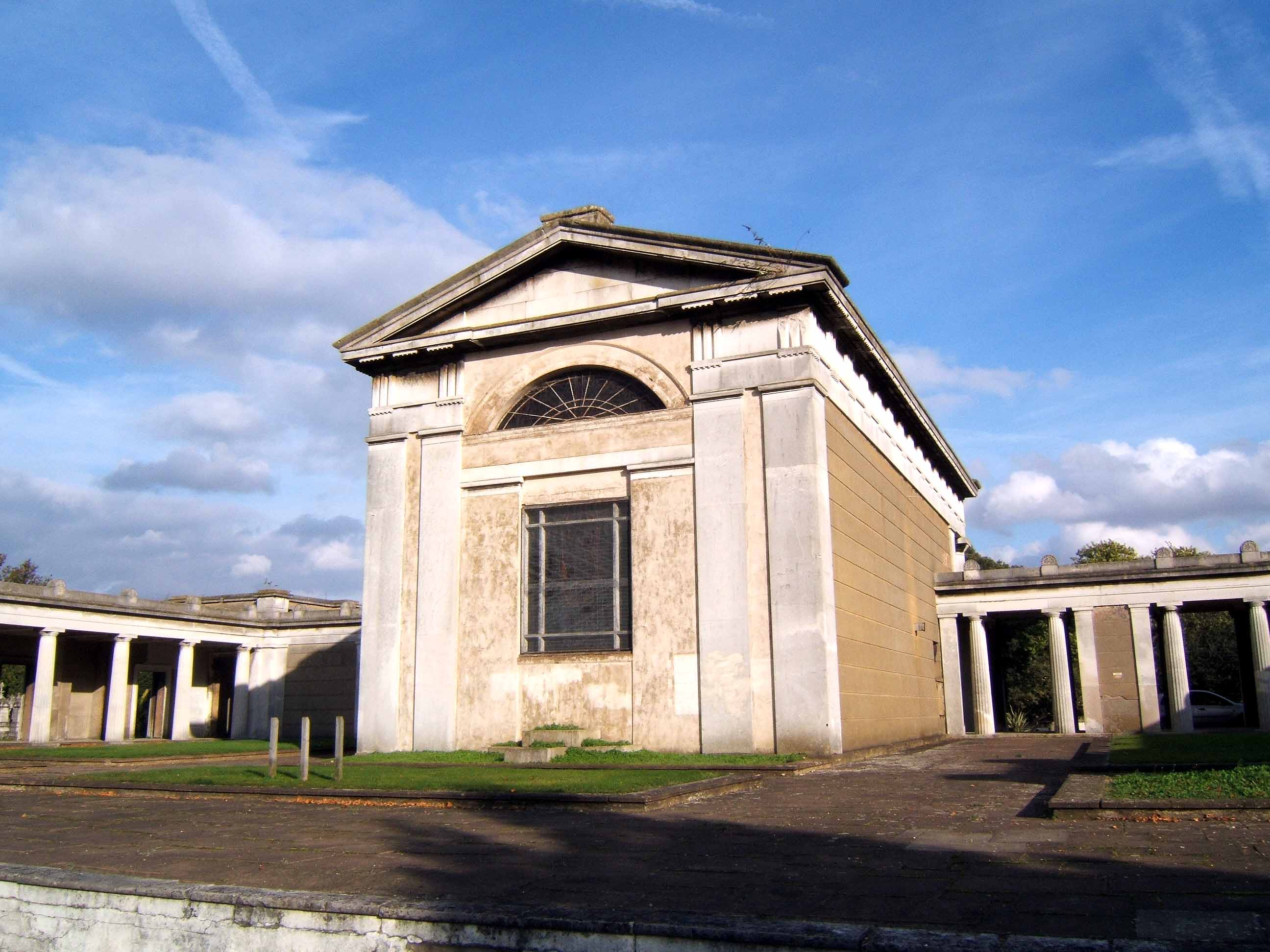
The Catacombs

The cemetery has three catacombs for the deposit of lead-sealed, triple-shelled coffins and cremated remains. Catacomb A, beneath the North Terrace Colonnade is now sealed. Catacomb Z, beneath the Dissenters' Chapel at the eastern end of the cemetery, suffered significant bomb damage during World War II, and is also closed to further deposits. Catacomb B, beneath the Anglican Chapel in the centre of the cemetery, has space for some 4,000 deposits, and still offers both private loculi and shelves or vaults for family groups. The catacomb extends under the entire footprint of the chapel and its colonnades. There are six aisles, within which each vault is numbered, running consecutively to number 216 at the south-western end of aisle 6.

Interment in the catacombs at Kensal Green has historically cost more that burial in a standard ground plot, though less than a brick-lined grave or private mausoleum. Because catacomb niches did not require the added cost or upkeep of an above-ground monument, they were frequently chosen by affluent families-particularly for unmarried adults, childless individuals, and young children who did not have an existent family plot of mausoleum elsewhere.

== War graves ==
The cemetery contains the graves of 473 Commonwealth service personnel of the First World War—half of whom form a war graves plot in the south-west corner, the remainder in small groups or individual graves scattered throughout the grounds—and 51 of the Second who are all dispersed. A distinct memorial list the names of Belgian soldiers who died serving in 1914-1918 and were buried here.

In the First World War plot, at Section 213, a Screen Wall memorial lists casualties of both world wars whose graves could not be marked by headstones, besides five Second World War servicemen who were cremated at Kensal Green (also known as West London) Crematorium. The highest-ranking person buried here who is commemorated by the CWGC is General Sir Charles Douglas (1850–1914), Chief of the Imperial General Staff in early months of the First World War.

== Notable burials ==
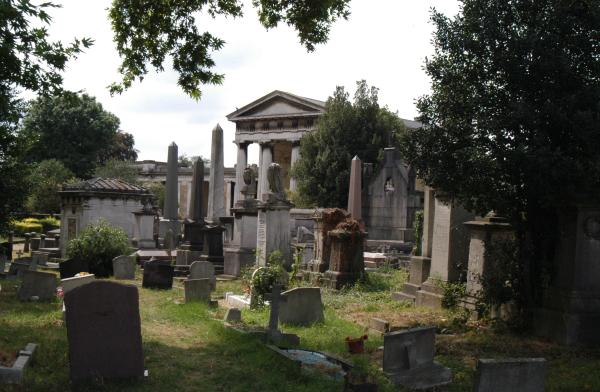
Monuments and chapel

- Henry Ainley (1879–1945), actor
- Clara Vestris Webster (1821- 1844), ballerina
- Harrison Ainsworth (1805–1882), author
- Thomas Allom (1804–1872), artist and architect
- Frederick Scott Archer (1813–1857), sculptor, photographer. Inventor of the Collodion process
- Charles Phillip Brown (1798–1884), an Englishman known for writing the first Telugu dictionary and for his contributions toward the Telugu language and Andhra people
- George Percy Badger (1815–1888), English Anglican missionary and scholar of oriental studies
- Betsy Balcombe (1802–1871), as a young girl, a close friend and confidante of Napoleon Bonaparte during his imprisonment on St. Helena Island
- Michael William Balfe (1808–1870), composer

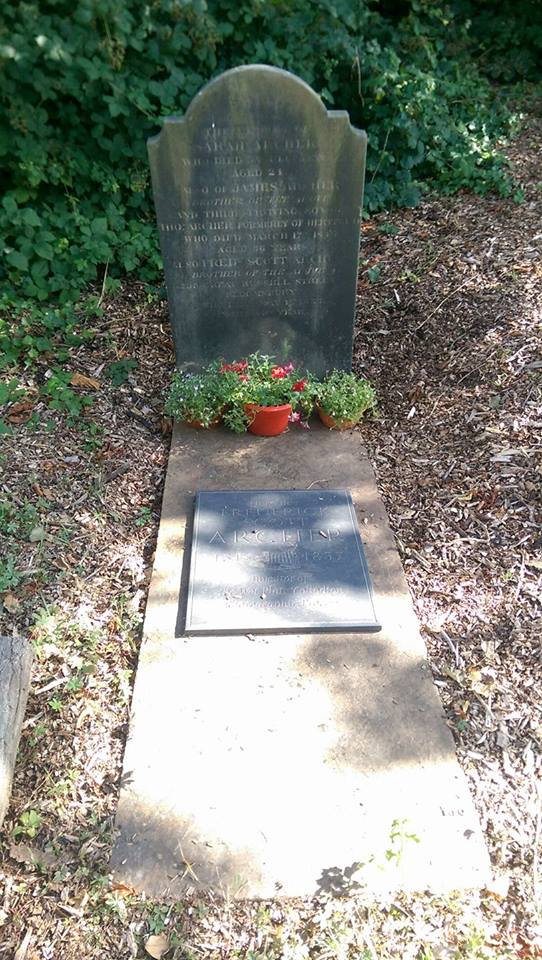
Grave of Frederick Scott Archer, inventor of the collodion photographic process in 1851. Location

- Frederick Settle Barff (1822–1866), chemist, inventor of Bower–Barff process
- James Barry (1795–1865), surgeon
- George Birkbeck (1776–1841), doctor, academic and adult education pioneer
- Suzanne Beauclerk, Duchess of St Albans (1921–2010), writer and painter
- William Behnes (1795–1864), sculptor
- Julius Benedict (1804–1885), composer
- Maria Björnson (1949–2002), theatre designer
- Charles Blondin (1824–1897), acrobat, tightrope-walker
- Sir George Bowen (1821–1899), colonial administrator and 9th Governor of Hong Kong
- Diamantina, Lady Bowen (c. 1832/1833 – 1893), grand dame
- John Braham (1774–1856), singer
- George Bridgetower (1782–1860), West Indian-Polish violin virtuoso and friend of Beethoven
- Louis-Charles Mahé de La Bourdonnais (1795–1840), chess master
- Howe Browne, 2nd Marquess of Sligo (1788–1845)
- Samuel George Bonham (1803–1863), 1st Baronet
- J. Lewis Bonhote (1875–1922), zoologist, ornithologist and writer
- Isambard Kingdom Brunel (1806–1859), engineer, son of Marc Isambard Brunel and Sophia Kingdom (also buried here)
- Marc Isambard Brunel (1769–1849), engineer, father of Isambard
- William Burn, eminent Scottish architect (1789–1870)
- Peter Burrowes (1753–1841) Irish politician
- Decimus Burton (1800–1881), architect
- Sir Augustus Wall Callcott (1779–1844), painter
- Lady Maria Callcott (1785–1842), travel writer
- George Frederick Carden (1798–1874), founder of the cemetery
- John Edward Carew (1785–1868), sculptor
- Anthony Carlisle (1768–1840), surgeon and scientist
- Sir Ernest Cassel (1852–1921), merchant banker
- John Hobart Caunter (1792–1851), writer and clergyman
- William Cavendish-Scott-Bentinck, 5th Duke of Portland (1800–1879), landowner and eccentric
- Frederic Chapman (1823–1895), publisher
- Marigold Frances Churchill, daughter of Sir Winston and Lady Clementine Churchill, who died from a fever in 1921 at age two (the monument by Eric Gill was listed Grade II in 2001). In 2019 the Churchill family acted on a long-held desire to reunite Marigold's remains with the rest of her family in Bladon churchyard. The empty grave and monument will remain at Kensal Green.
- Henry Savile Clarke (1841–1893), dramatist and critic
- Thomas John Cochrane (Sir) (1789–1872) Cemetery plot number 21777, 1st governor of Newfoundland 1825–34, Member of Parliament for Ipswich 1839–41, Admiral of the fleet 1865–72
- Wilkie Collins (1824–1889), author
- James Combe (d. 1867), engineer of Temple Works, Leeds
- Joshua Compston (1970–1996), curator
- Montague Corry, 1st Baron Rowton (1838–1903), secretary to Disraeli and philanthropic founder of Rowton Houses
- Sir Michael Costa (1808–1884), conductor and composer
- Anne Crawford (1920–1956), actress
- Rev John Cumming (1807–1881), author
- UK Major General Sir Alexander Cunningham KCIE CSI, archaeologist, aide-de-camp to Governor General of India Lord Auckland, executive engineer to the king of Oudh (India), chief engineer of Burma, Colonel of the Royal Engineers.
- James Dark (1795–1871), proprietor of Lord's Cricket Ground
- Philmore 'Boots' Davidson (1928–1993) Trinidadian musician. Introduced the steel band to Britain
- Admiral Ross Donnelly (1761–1840)
- John Doubleday (about 1798–1856), restorer at the British Museum who reassembled the Portland Vase
- Alice Drakoules (c. 1850–1933), British social reformer
- Andrew Ducrow (1793–1842), circus performer and horse-rider
- Willie Edouin (1841–1908), comedian, actor and theatre manager
- Sir George Elliot (1784–1863), naval officer
- John Epps (1805–1869), phrenologist
- John Edward Errington (1806–1862) civil engineer
- Edward Francis Fitzwilliam (1824–1857), composer
- Fanny Fitzwilliam (1801–1854), actress, singer and theatre manager
- Ann Foster (1827–1882), widow of John Foster of Hobart, Member of the Tasmanian Legislative Assembly. Formerly Ann Dinham, she was transported to Tasmania in 1852 and was one of few Australian convicts to return to her native land (Grave No. 28305)
- Henri Jean-Baptiste Victoire Fradelle (1778–1865), Franco-English Victorian painter
- Erich Fried (1921–1988), Austrian poet and essayist
- William Anthony Furness, 2nd Viscount Furness (1929-1995), theatrical producer and Knight of Malta
- Henry Gauntlett (1810–1876), composer
- John Gibson (1817–1892), architect. RIBA Gold Medal recipient 1890
- Sir Walter Raleigh Gilbert (1785–1853)
- George Bellas Greenough (1778–1855), geologist
- George Grossmith (1847–1912), actor and comedian
- Philip Hardwick (1792–1870), architect
- Philip Charles Hardwick (1822–1892), architect
- Fairlie Harmar Viscountess Harberton RA (1876–1945) painter and suffragette
- Henry Hawkins, 1st Baron Brampton (1817–1907)
- Catherine Hayes (1818–1861), opera singer
- Henry Herman (1832–1894), English dramatist and novelist
- Rev Ridley Herschell (1807–1864)
- Major General Sir John Hills FRSE CB KCB (1834–1902)
- Thomas Hood (1799–1845), poet, humorist and journalist

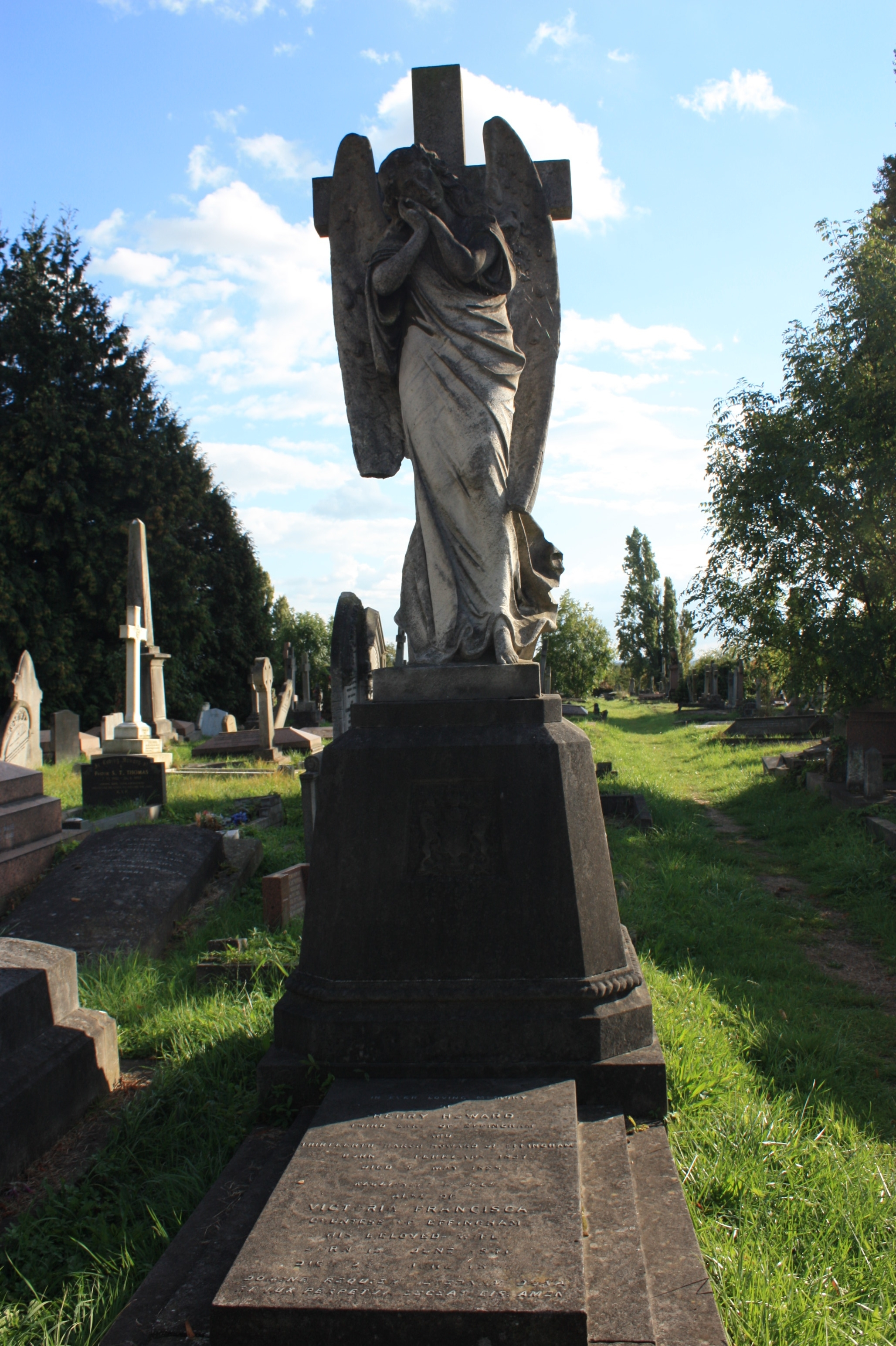
Grave of Henry Howard, 3rd Earl of Effingham

- Henry Howard, 3rd Earl of Effingham (1837–1898)
- Sir Neville Howse (1863–1930), the first Australian recipient of the Victoria Cross, and one of 13 holders of the award buried in this cemetery
- Joseph Hume (1777–1855), MP and political campaigner
- James Henry Leigh Hunt (1784–1859), Romantic critic, essayist and poet
- Austen Hurgon (1862–1942), theatrical director
- Frank Linsly James (1851–1890), exhumed in 1917 and re-interred in the family plot at West Dean, West Sussex
- Sir Leander Starr Jameson (1853–1917), former Prime Minister of Cape Colony and architect of the Jameson Raid – initially buried in a vault here, later reburied in Matobo Hills, Zimbabwe
- Lionel Johnson (1867–1902), poet, member of the Rhymer's Club and an influence on W. B. Yeats
- Charles Kemble (1775–1854), actor and theatre manager
- Fanny Kemble (1809–1893), famous British actress and author
- Halina Korn (1902–1978), Polish painter and sculptor
- Marian Kukiel (1885–1972), Polish General and Minister for War in exile during World War II
- Michael Lane (1802–1868), civil engineer
- William Garrett Lewis (b. before 1834; d. 1885) pastor of Westbourne Grove Church
- Joseph Locke (1805–1860), civil engineer
- John St. John Long (1798–1834), quack doctor
- John Claudius Loudon (1783–1843), Scottish botanist and writer on cemeteries
- John Graham Lough (1789–1876), sculptor
- Sir John Louis, 2nd Baronet (1785–1863)
- Sir Andrew Lusk, 1st Baronet (1810–1909) Lord Mayor of London 1873–74
- John Robinson McClean (1817–1873), politician
- Vice Admiral Sir Robert John Le Mesurier McClure CB (1807–1873) discoverer of the Northwest Passage 1850–53
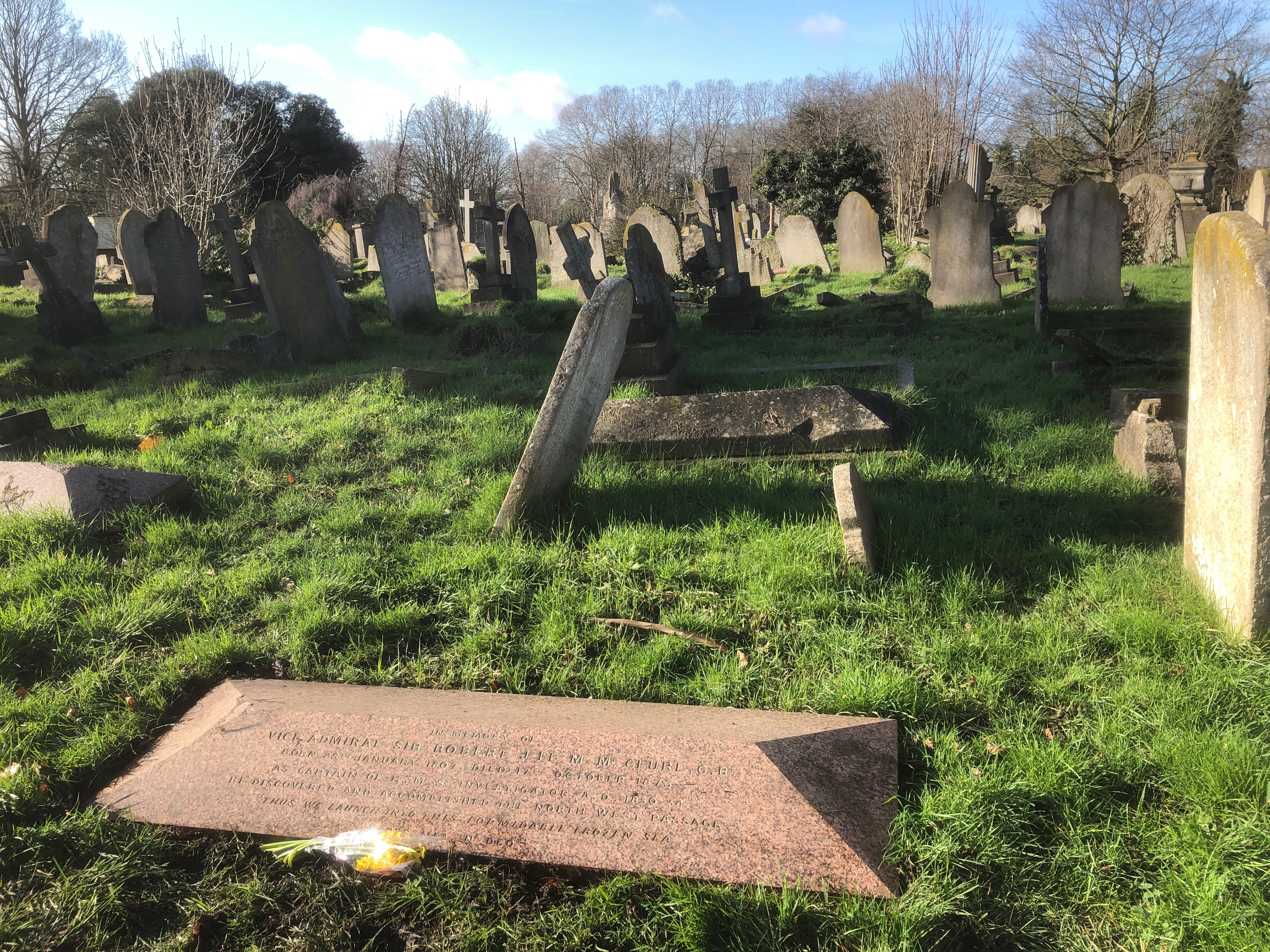
  Grave of Robert McClure in Kensal Green Cemetery, London
- Alexander McDonnell (1798–1835), chess master
- Richard Graves MacDonnell (1814–1881), colonial administrator and 6th Governor of Hong Kong
- Sir James McGrigor (1771–1858), Scottish botanist
- Sir Donald Friell McLeod (1810–1872)
- William Macready (1793–1873), actor
- Sir George Makins (1853–1933), surgeon
- Edward Maltby (1770–1859), bishop of Durham
- Florence Marryat (1833–1899), novelist, editor, actress and playwright
- Kitty Melrose (1883–1912), actress
- Archibald Menzies (1754–1842), botanist, surgeon
- Ras Andargachew Messai (1902–1981), Ethiopian ruler
- Kate Meyrick (1875–1933), night club owner
- John Maddison Morton (1811–1891), playwright
- John Lothrop Motley (1814–1877), American historian
- Billy Murdoch (1854–1911), Australian cricket captain
- John Trivett Nettleship (1841–1902), painter and author
- Feargus O'Connor (1796–1855), MP, Chartist Leader and social reformer
- Patrick O'Connell (1887–1959), Footballer with Belfast Celtic, captain of Ireland and Manchester United (1914), Manager of Barcelona FC during Spanish Civil War
- Admiral Robert Otway (1773–1846)
- Robert Owen (cenotaph only) (1771–1858), industrialist and major social reformer
- John Thomas Perceval (1803–1876), army officer, writer and campaigner
- Jacob Perkins (1766–1849), American inventor
- George Perry (1793–1862), composer
- Harold Pinter (1930–2008), playwright, actor, director, screenwriter, poet and political activist
- Frederic Hervey Foster Quin (1799–1878), physician
- Sir Terence Rattigan (1911–1977), playwright (ashes)
- Emidio Recchioni (1864–1933), Italian anarchist and businessman
- Robert Reece (1838–1891), comic playwright and librettist
- Emil Reich (1854–1910), Austro-Hungarian-born historian
- John Rennie the Younger (1794–1874) civil engineer

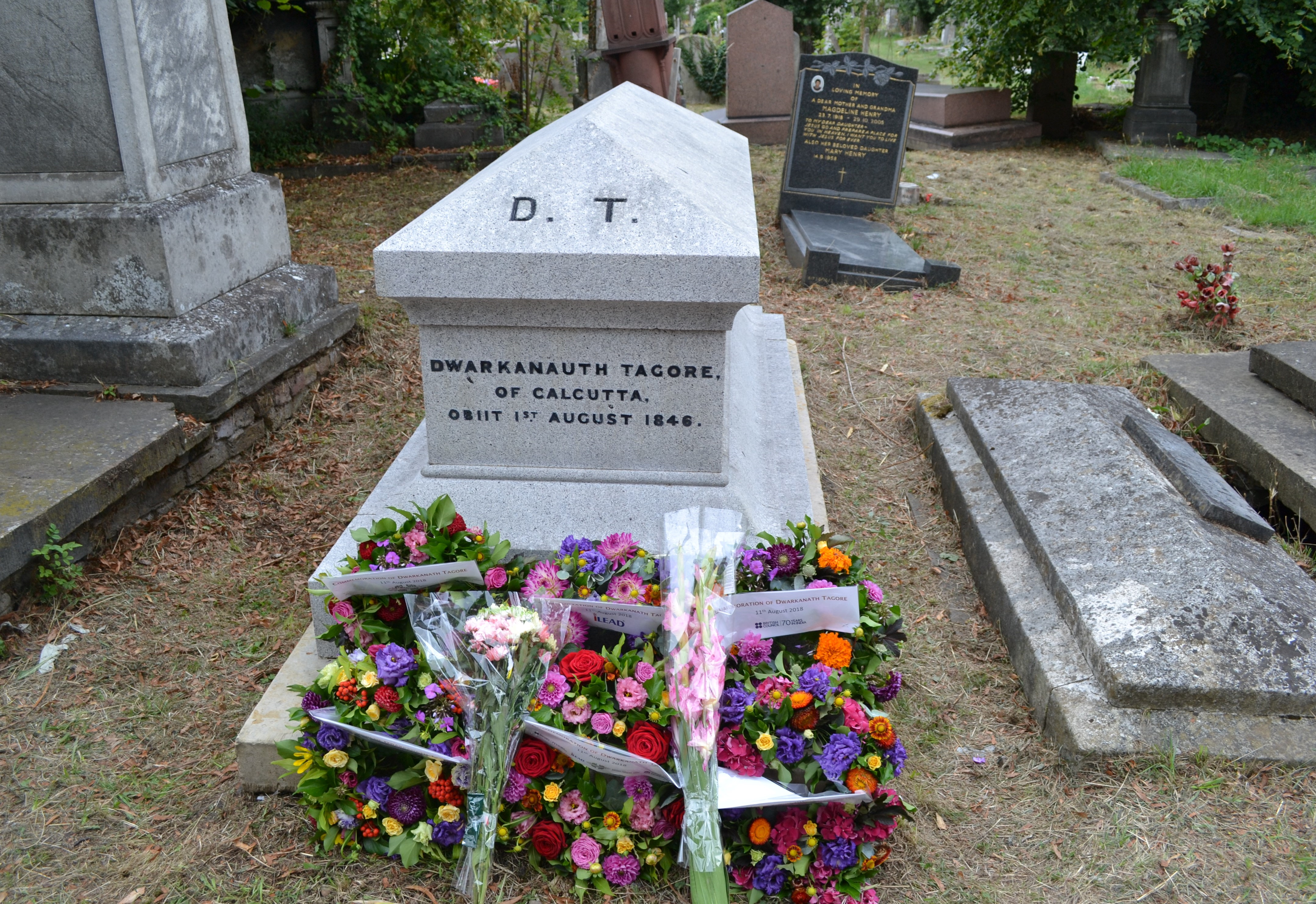
Monument of Dwarkanath Tagore at Kensal Green Cemetery renovated by Bengal Heritage Foundation on 11 August 2018

- Dwarkanath Tagore (1794–1846), Bengali industrialist and benefactor
- John Wigham Richardson (1837–1908), shipbuilder
- Charles Ritchie, 1st Baron Ritchie of Dundee (1838–1906), politician, former Chancellor of Exchequer
- Henry Sandham (1842–1910), artist
- Eileen Sharp (1900–1958), singer and actress
- Byam Shaw (1872–1919), artist
- John Shaw Jr. (1803–1870), architect and brother-in-law of Philip Hardwick listed above
- Sir William Siemens (1823–1883), industrialist
- Robert William Sievier (1794–1865), sculptor (also member of Cemetery board)
- John Benjamin Smith (1794–1879), MP
- John Mark Frederick Smith (1790–1874), British Army general
- William Henry Smith (1792–1865), businessman
- Alexis Soyer (1810–1858), Chef and Humanitarian.
- Howard Staunton (1810–1874), prominent chess player
- John McDouall Stuart (1815–1866), explorer in Australia

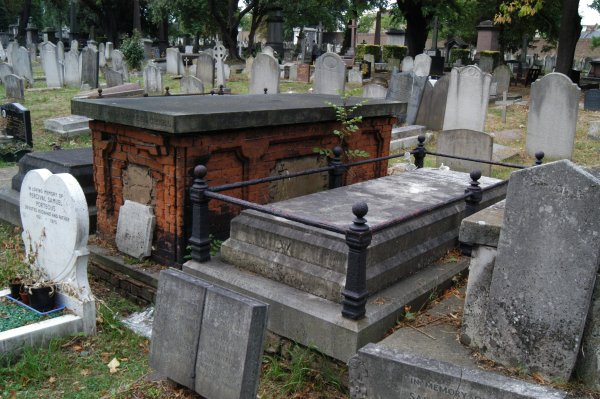
Grave of William Makepeace Thackeray (marble slab in front of brick tomb)

- William Makepeace Thackeray (1811–1863), writer
- Bert Thomas (1883–1966), cartoonist
- Lydia Thompson (1838–1908), dancer and actress
- Thérèse Tietjens (1831–1877), opera singer
- Sir Nicholas Conyngham Tindal (1776–1846), Solicitor General and Lord Chief Justice of the Common Pleas
- Steve Peregrin Took (1949–1980), English musician and songwriter (best known as a founding member of Tyrannosaurus Rex)
- Anthony Trollope (1815–1882), novelist
- Sir Thomas Troubridge, 3rd Baronet (1815–1867), British army officer
- J. Stuart Russell (1816–1895), theologian and author
- James Malcolm Rymer (1814–1884), writer
- William Vincent Wallace (1812–1865), composer
- Thomas Wakley (1795–1862), surgeon, campaigner and founder of The Lancet
- John William Waterhouse (1849–1917), artist
- Friedrich Martin Josef Welwitsch (1806-1872), Austrian botanist
- John Whichcord Jr. (1823–1885), architect
- Jane Williams (1798–1884), subject of poems by Percy Bysshe Shelley
- Alfred Wigan (1814–1878), actor-manager
- William Williams (1788–1865), radical MP
- Walter Clopton Wingfield (1833–1912), pioneer of lawn tennis

The cemetery is remarkable for the number of Fellows of the Royal Society who are buried there, of whom the following is a small sample:

- Charles Babbage FRS (1816) (1791–1871), mathematician and computer scientist
- George Bishop FRS (1848)
- William John Broderip FRS (1828)
- Robert Brown FRS (1839) (1773–1858), botanist, discoverer of Brownian motion
- Samuel Hawksley Burbury FRS (1890)
- George Busk FRS (1850) (1807–1886), naval surgeon, zoologist and palaeontologist
- Alexander John Ellis FRS (1864)
- Hugh Falconer FRS (1845) (1808–1865), naturalist
- David Forbes FRS (1858), mineralogist
- Thomas Galloway FRS (1848)
- John Hall Gladstone FRS (1853)
- Joseph Glynn FRS (1838)
- John Gould FRS (1843)
- William Robert Grove Sir, FRS (1847)
- Edmond Herbert Grove-Hills FRS (1911)
- Frank McClean FRS (1895)
- George Newport FRS (1846)
- Reverend Baden Powell, FRS (1824) father of Robert and Agnes Baden-Powell
- Joseph Sabine FRS (1799)
- George James Symons FRS (1879)
- Edward Troughton FRS (1810)
- Edward Turner FRS (1830), chemist
- Nathaniel Wallich FRS (1829)
- Sir Charles Wheatstone FRS FRSE (1802–1875) inventor of the Wheatstone bridge
- John Percy FRS (1847) (1817–1889), metallurgist

=== Royal burials ===
British

- Prince Augustus Frederick, Duke of Sussex and son of King George III
- Princess Sophia, sister of Prince Augustus Frederick and daughter of King George III
- Prince George, Duke of Cambridge, grandson of George III and commander-in-chief of the British Army

Overseas

- Maharani Jind Kaur, of the Sikh Empire, mother of the last Punjabi Maharaja Duleep Singh – temporarily deposited in the catacomb below the Dissenters' Chapel following her death in exile in 1863 before her body was allowed to return to the Punjab for cremation. Following the discovery of a slab commemorating Jind Kaur (now in the Ancient House Museum, Thetford), a memorial was erected here in 2009.
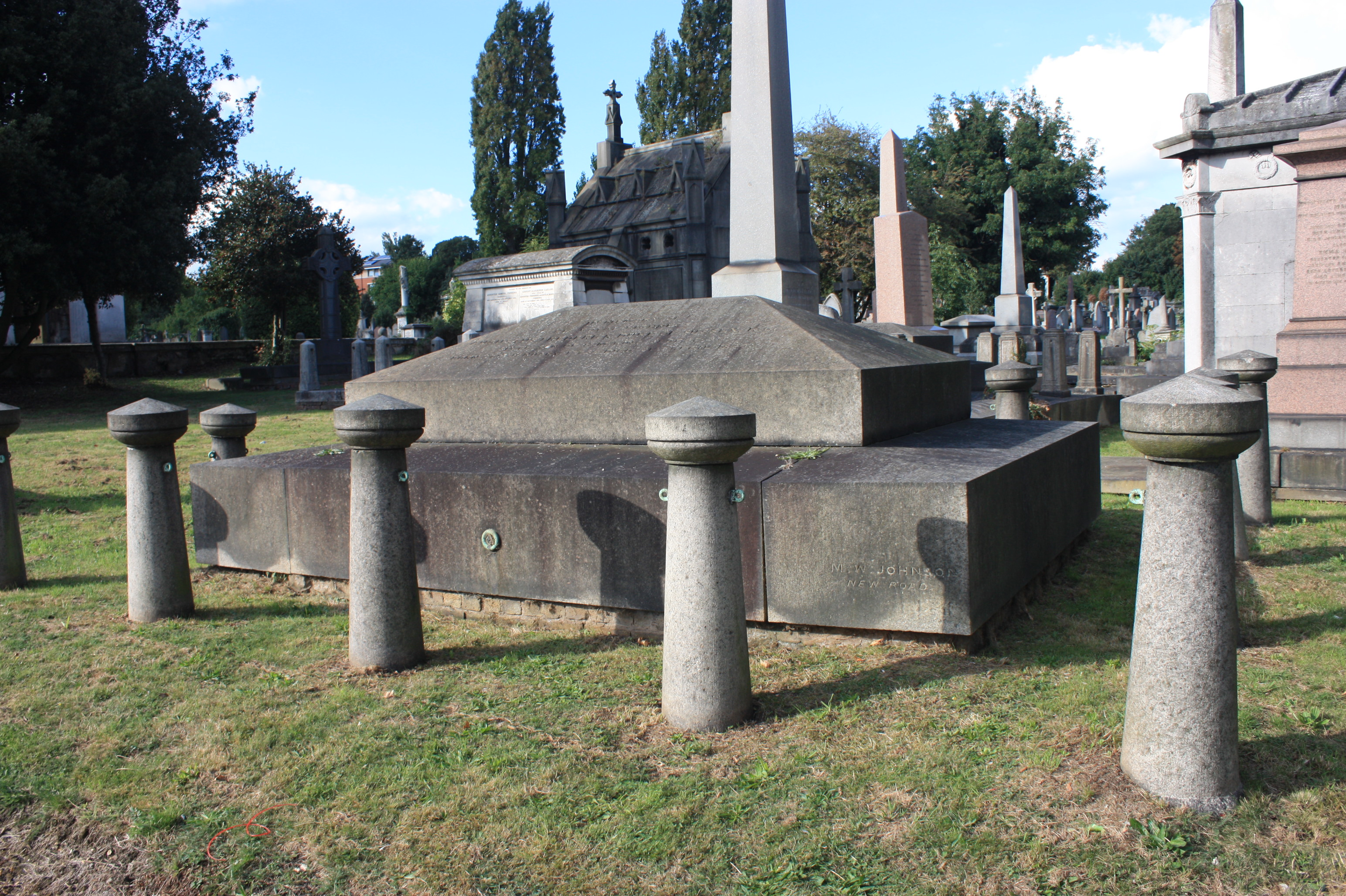
Tomb of Prince Augustus Frederick, Duke of Sussex

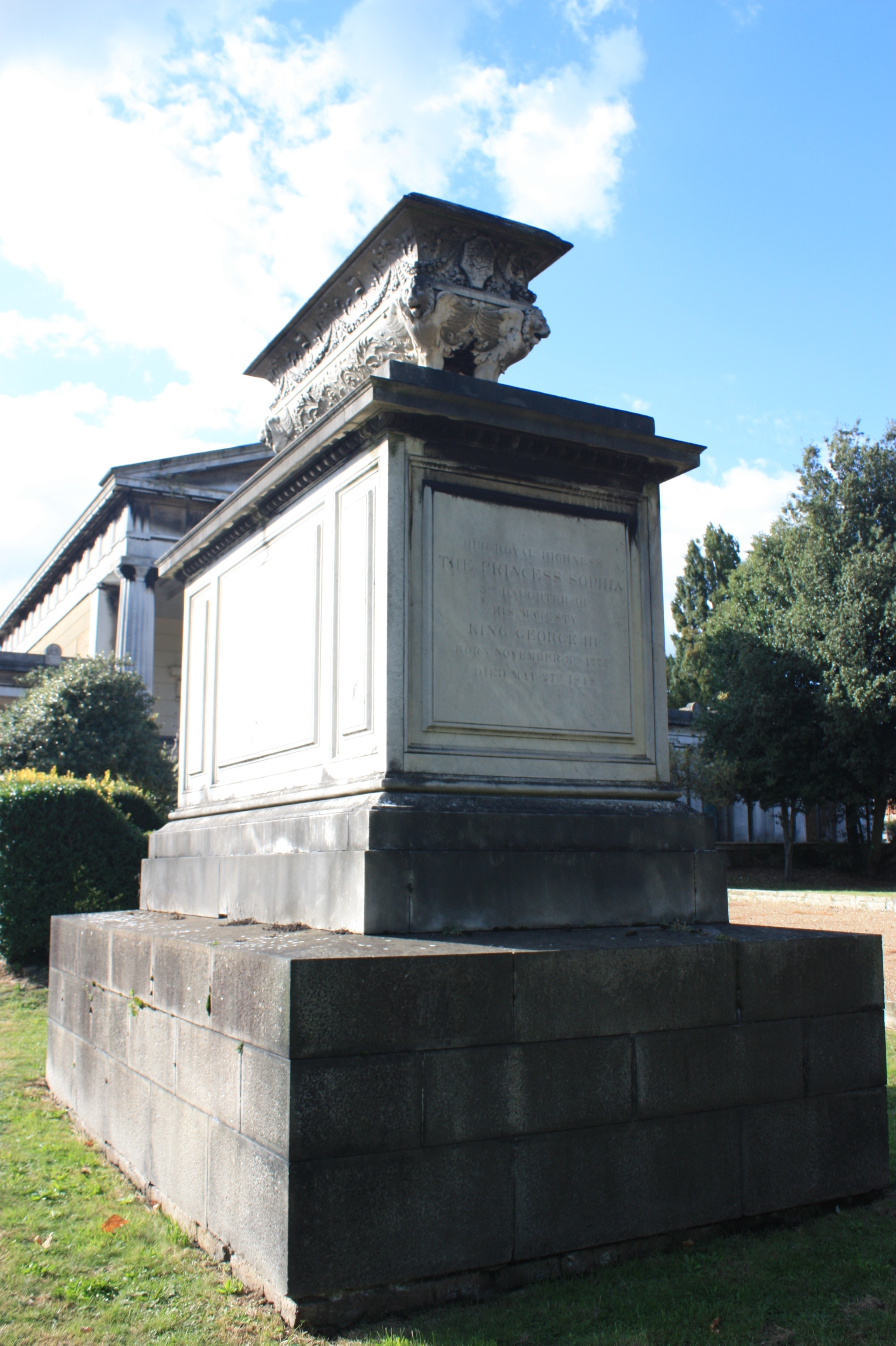
Tomb of Princess Sophia

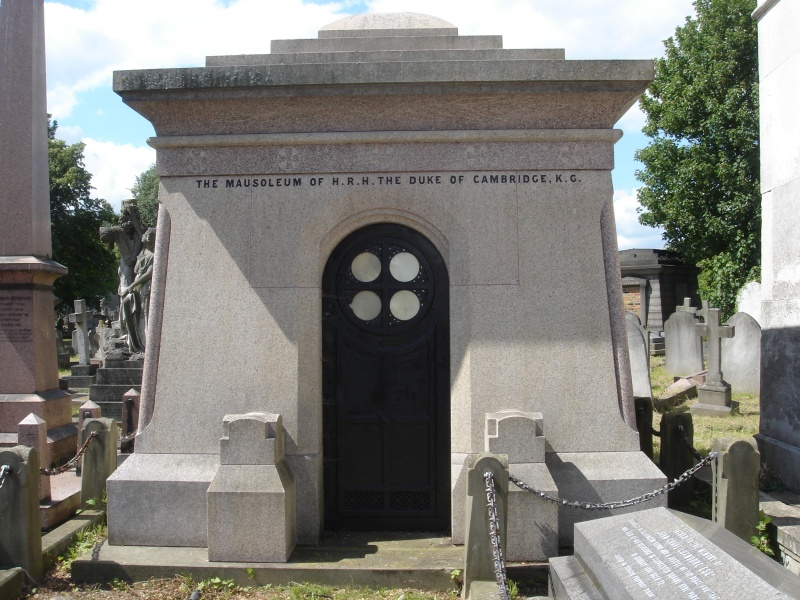
Funerary monument, Duke of Cambridge

=== Notable cremations ===
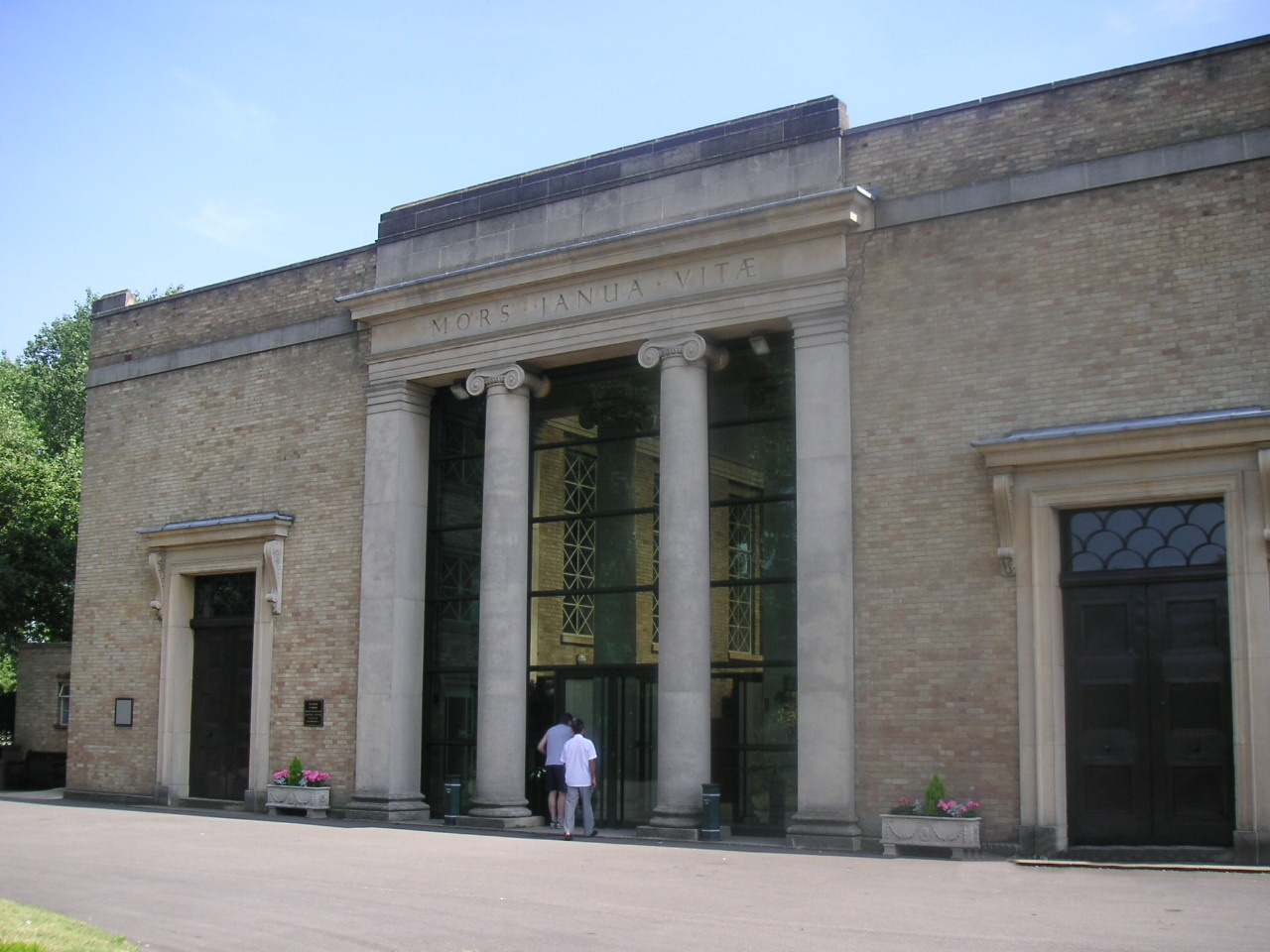
West London Crematorium

- Dame Sarah Oram (1860–1946), senior military nurse.
- Major Herbert James (1888–1958), VC winner at Gallipoli, First World War.
- Rita Webb (1904-1981), actress.
- Ingrid Bergman (1915–1982), actress (most of her ashes were scattered around the islet of Dannholmen off the fishing village of Fjällbacka on the west coast of Sweden where she spent most summers from 1958 to her death in 1982, with the remainder of her ashes buried at Norra begravningsplatsen in Stockholm, Sweden next to her parents).
- Freddie Mercury (1946–1991), singer in the rock band Queen, is commemorated by a small plinth under his birth name, Farrokh Bulsara, near which his ashes, the exact whereabouts of which are currently unknown, are traditionally held to be buried.
- Kaye Webb (1914-1996), editor and publisher
- Sir Anthony Nutting (1920–1999), former diplomat and Conservative MP.
- Joe Strummer (1952–2002), singer-songwriter in the punk rock band the Clash, was cremated here and his ashes were then given to his family.
- George Melly (1926-2007), jazz and blues singer, critic.
- Alan Rickman (1946–2016), actor and director.
- Pete Burns (1959–2016), singer–songwriter and television personality.
- Christine Keeler (1942–2017), model and showgirl.
- Gary Rhodes (1960–2019), chef.
- Eddie Linden (1935–2023), poet and editor.

== Preservation, conservation and restoration ==
Although the cemetery is owned and run by the General Cemetery Company, The Friends of Kensal Green Cemetery is a charitable organisation whose purpose is the preservation, conservation and restoration for the public benefit of Kensal Green Cemetery. The charity organises tours and other events in the cemetery and has published books about the cemetery. The office of the Friends is in the Dissenters Chapel. The Friends group is a member of The National Federation of Cemetery Friends.

== See also ==
- List of notable burials at Kensal Green Cemetery

== Sources ==
- Records held at Kensal Green Cemetery
- Liza Picard (2006). Victorian London. Orion. pp. 361–365. ISBN 0753820900.
