= Rolling road (disambiguation) =

Rolling road may refer to:

- Rolling Road, a major road in Maryland, USA
- In rail transport rolling road, refers to trucks carried on trains for part of their journey. See rolling highway
- Rolling Road (VRE station), train station on the Manassas Line, Virginia Railway Express, USA
- The Rolling Road, a 1927 British film
- Rolling road, a term sometimes used for a chassis dynamometer
- The Rolling English Road, a poem by G. K. Chesterton
