= Kitty Melrose =

English stage actress and singer

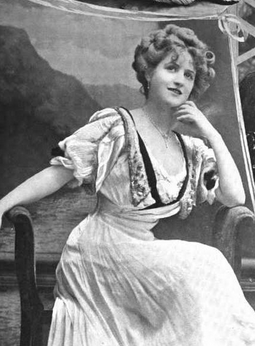
- Kitty Melrose, from a 1907 publication
- Born: Agnes Butterfield; 6 September 1881; Whitehaven, Cumberland, England
- Died: 3 June 1912 (aged 30); Westminster, London, England
- Cause of death: Suicide by asphyxiation
- Occupation: Stage actress

Kitty Melrose (née Agnes Butterfield; 6 September 1881 – 3 June 1912) was an English stage actress and singer.

== Life ==
Born Agnes Butterfield, Melrose was born in Cumberland to Stephen and Jane Butterfield. Her father later worked as a clothier in Blackpool, Lancashire.

In 1909, while in New York performing The Dollar Princess at the Knickerbocker Theatre, was severely injured while hit with a ball while golfing with F. Pope Stamper. They initially feared she might be disfigured, but excellent surgery left her with only a small scar. She recovered, and made her last stage appearance at the London Adelphi Theatre in The Quaker Girl, a musical that opened on 5 November 1910 and ran for 536 performances.

== Death ==
In 1912, Melrose committed suicide at her apartment in Smith Square, Westminster. A public inquest revealed that Melrose, who was found in her locked apartment with her head in the oven, had died from asphyxiation caused by carbon monoxide poisoning. Her family blamed the suicide on heartbreak after her fiancé, Edward Lawson-Johnson, broke off their engagement. His family, who supported him financially, had discovered the pair were living together outside of wedlock and forbid him marrying her.

Letters found in her apartment revealed that Lawson-Johnson—described as "a man about town" by the press—broke up with her by post. Their contents were read at the inquest. Lawson-Johnson wrote,

"Marriage is impossible from the family and also, as you know, the financial point of view. You know my feelings towards you, so I need not say anything about that. Without money we must come to grief. I know I was very wrong in letting you believe it was possible, but my nerves were very tried with your several illnesses."

Her unposted response,

Eddie, my dear one, I cannot bear any more, and everyone has told me you won't, and have done with me. I am heartbroken, and cannot bear any more. Please forgive me, but I know as you do not love in' you will soon forget me. All my love, and good luck to you. Your Kit. P.S. It was wrong for every one to keep you from me. It has made it too impossible. I cannot fight alone, but I did believe in you, and did not think you would fail me. But God's will. I know you thought you were doing right. Eddie, By leaving me alone you thought you were doing right, but it wavs all wrong and cruel. God forgive you, as I hope he will forgive me.

Dr Eugene Michael Niall of Piccadilly testified he had treated her three months earlier for a "nervous breakdown" after she had taken barbital. Her father stated that she had previously attempted to take her life a few years earlier.

The inquest returned a verdict of "suicide during temporary insanity." She was buried in London at the Kensal Green Cemetery, Kensal Green.
