= George Frederick Carden =

English barrister, magazine editor and businessman

- Born: 1798
- Died: 18 November 1874 (aged 75–76)
- Occupations: Barrister, magazine editor, businessman
- Known for: Credited with the development of the garden cemetery movement in Britain and the foundation of London's pioneering example: Kensal Green Cemetery.

George Frederick Carden (1798 – 18 November 1874) was an English barrister, magazine editor and businessman, credited with the development of the garden cemetery movement in Britain and the foundation of London's pioneering example: Kensal Green Cemetery.

== Development of the General Cemetery Company ==
Carden, later editor of the Penny Magazine, was apparently inspired by a visit to Paris's Père-Lachaise Cemetery in 1821, and saw an opportunity to replace overcrowded, insanitary church graveyards with appealing suburban cemeteries catering for the affluent middle and upper classes. His first prospectus, issued in 1825, failed, but a new committee established in February 1830, including Andrew Spottiswoode, MP for Saltash, sculptor Robert William Sievier, banker Sir John Dean Paul, Charles Broughton Bowman (first committee secretary), and architects Thomas Willson (who had previously proposed an ambitious Metropolitan Sepulchre project) and Augustus Charles Pugin, gained more financial, political and public support to fund the 'General Cemetery Company'. Public meetings were held in June and July 1830 at the Freemasons' Tavern, and Carden was elected treasurer. On 11 July 1832, the Act of Parliament establishing a 'General Cemetery Company for the interment of the Dead in the Neighbourhood of the Metropolis' gained Royal Assent.

=== Dismissal from company ===
Paul was a partner in the London banking firm of Strahan, Paul, Paul and Bates. He found and conditionally purchased the 54 acres of land at Kensal Green for £9,500. The Act incorporating the General Cemetery Company authorised it to raise up to £45,000 in shares, buy up to 80 acres of land and build a cemetery and a Church of England chapel. However, Paul and Carden were already embroiled in a dispute regarding the design of the cemetery, where Paul favoured the Grecian style and Carden the Gothic style. A succession of architects were contemplated, including Benjamin Wyatt (who declined), Charles Fowler (proposal not taken up), Francis Goodwin, Willson, and a Mr Lidell, a pupil of John Nash, before an architectural competition was launched in November 1831. This attracted 46 entrants, and in March 1832 the premium was awarded, despite some opposition, for a Gothic Revival design by Henry Edward Kendall; this decision was, however, eventually overturned as the Company directors (appointed after the Bill received Royal Assent) asserted their control and preference for a different style. One of the competition judges and a company shareholder, John William Griffith, who had previously produced working drawings for a boundary wall, ultimately designed the cemetery's two chapels and the main gateway. Meanwhile, Paul had been elected treasurer in place of Carden, who was reduced to the position of registrar. In February 1833 Carden was suspended from the board of directors for making statements prejudicial to the company, and four months later removed as registrar.

== Later life ==
Carden, associated with addresses in The Grove, Hendon and 2 Sussex Gardens near Hyde Park, London, died on 18 November 1874 and was buried in Kensal Green.
