= Metropolitan Sepulchre =

Planned necropolis in Primrose Hill, London

The Metropolitan Sepulchre was a massive pyramidal necropolis proposed for construction in Primrose Hill in London in the 19th century as a way of addressing the shortage of burial space in the London area. Designed by the architect Thomas Willson, it would have been 90 stories high, and capable of holding up to five million dead. The 18-acre footprint of the pyramid would have allowed a number of burials equal to 1000 acre of regular cemetery ground. Willson said that "Not many centuries will pass away before it will not only be completely filled, but that another one will be required."

The pyramid would have been faced with granite blocks, and had flights of stairs on every side, leading to an obelisk and astronomical observatory at the pyramid's peak. The project would have cost around £7 million. There were significant objections to the plan: the authorities were uncertain as to whether such massive weight could be supported by the land and many London residents objected to the concept as a "horrible abomination". The pyramid was never built, and the need for it was supplanted by the creation of a ring of "garden cemeteries" around London. According to one source, the first was "George Frederick Carden's pioneering park cemetery, Kensal Green Cemetery, modeled after Paris's Père-Lachaise", and the second was Highgate Cemetery, designed by architect Stephen Geary, which opened in 1839.

== See also ==
- London Necropolis Railway
