= The Flying Inn =

1914 novel by G. K. Chesterton

- First UK edition
- Author: G. K. Chesterton
- Language: English
- Genre: Speculative fiction, adventure, satire
- Publisher: John Lane (US); Methuen (UK)
- Publication date: 1914
- Publication place: United Kingdom
- Media type: Print (Hardback)
- Pages: 320

The Flying Inn is a 1914 novel by English writer G. K. Chesterton. It is set in a future England where the temperance movement has allowed a bizarre form of Progressive Islam to dominate the political and social life of the country. Because of this, alcohol sales to the poor are effectively prohibited, while the rich can get alcoholic drinks "under a medical certificate". The plot centres on the adventures of Humphrey Pump (see also the Humphrey pump) and Captain Patrick Dalroy, who roam the country in their cart with a barrel of rum in an attempt to evade prohibition, exploiting loopholes in the law to temporarily prevent the police taking action against them. Eventually the heroes and their followers foil an attempted coup by an Islamic military force.

The novel includes the poem The Rolling English Road. The poem was first published under the title A Song of Temperance Reform in the New Witness in 1913.
