= The Rolling English Road =

1913 poem by G. K. Chesterton

Before the Roman came to Rye or out to Severn strode,
The rolling English drunkard made the rolling English road.
A reeling road, a rolling road, that rambles round the shire,
And after him the parson ran, the sexton and the squire;
A merry road, a mazy road, and such as we did tread
The night we went to Birmingham by way of Beachy Head.

I knew no harm of Bonaparte and plenty of the Squire,
And for to fight the Frenchman I did not much desire;
But I did bash their baggonets because they came arrayed
To straighten out the crooked road an English drunkard made,
Where you and I went down the lane with ale-mugs in our hands,
The night we went to Glastonbury by way of Goodwin Sands.

His sins they were forgiven him; or why do flowers run
Behind him; and the hedges all strengthening in the sun?
The wild thing went from left to right and knew not which was which,
But the wild rose was above him when they found him in the ditch.
God pardon us, nor harden us; we did not see so clear
The night we went to Bannockburn by way of Brighton Pier.

My friends, we will not go again or ape an ancient rage,
Or stretch the folly of our youth to be the shame of age,
But walk with clearer eyes and ears this path that wandereth,
And see undrugged in evening light the decent inn of death;
For there is good news yet to hear and fine things to be seen,
Before we go to Paradise by way of Kensal Green.

— G. K. Chesterton

"The Rolling English Road" is one of the best-known poems by G. K. Chesterton. It was first published under the title "A Song of Temperance Reform" in the New Witness in 1913. It was also included in the novel by Chesterton, The Flying Inn, in 1914.

The poem is written in heptameters. Alliteration is plentiful and "a particularly useful device in the last line of each stanza, playfully yoking the far-flung places together (Birmingham/Beachy Head, etc) and reminding us that, like a pub comic, our narrator is, supposedly, improvising his tall story. When he drops the alliterative yoke in the last stanza ("Paradise ... Kensal Green") you know he's being serious."

In the final line of the poem, Kensal Green refers to Kensal Green Cemetery in London.

A restaurant in the local area, on Chamberlayne road, uses most of the last line, "Paradise by way of Kensal Green" as its name.

Folk singer Maddy Prior set the poem to music in 2010 and recorded it on her album "Flesh and Blood".

== See also ==
- Byway (road)
