= List of Guggenheim Fellowships awarded in 1956 =

Two hundred and seventy-five scholars and artists were awarded Guggenheim Fellowships in 1956. More than $1,100,000 was disbursed and the number of fellows was the highest in the fellowship's history up to that date.

== 1956 U.S. and Canadian Fellows ==
Category	Field of Study	Fellow	Institutional association	Research topic	Notes	Ref
Creative Arts	Drama and Performance Art	Harry Miles Muheim	New York University	Writing a musical		
Creative Arts	Fine Arts	Roger William Anliker	Carnegie Tech	Painting		
Creative Arts	Fine Arts	Ralph Wilfred Borge	California College of Arts and Crafts, Oakland Technical Adult School	Painting		
Creative Arts	Fine Arts	John Hultberg		Painting		
Creative Arts	Fine Arts	Ben Kamihira	Pennsylvania Academy of Fine Arts, Philadelphia Museum of Art	Painting	Also won in 1955	
Creative Arts	Fine Arts	Roger Edward Kuntz	Scripps College, Claremont Graduate School	Exploration of a middle ground between objective and nonobjective paintings		
Creative Arts	Fine Arts	George L. Mueller		Painting		
Creative Arts	Fine Arts	Robert Sterling Neuman	State University of New York	Survey of contemporary Spanish paintings		
Creative Arts	Fine Arts	Stanley Twardowicz	Hofstra University	Painting		
Creative Arts	Fine Arts	Andre Racz	Columbia University	Printmaking		
Creative Arts	Fiction	David Karp		Novel writing		
Creative Arts	Fiction	Thomas Hal Phillips		Novel writing	Also won in 1953	
Creative Arts	Fiction	Frank Rooney		Novel writing		
Creative Arts	Fiction	David R. Wagoner	University of Washington	Novel writing		
Creative Arts	Fiction	Donald Wetzel		The Rain and the Fire and the Will of God (published 1957)		
Creative Arts	Music Composition	Theodore Ward Chanler	Harvard University	Composing	Also won in 1944	
Creative Arts	Music Composition	Carlos Chávez		Composing	Also won in 1938	
Creative Arts	Music Composition	Carlisle Floyd	University of Houston	Composing		
Creative Arts	Music Composition	Edmund Thomas Haines		Composing	Also won in 1957	
Creative Arts	Music Composition	Earl Kim	Princeton University	Composing		
Creative Arts	Music Composition	Ezra Laderman	Yale School of Music	Chamber concerto collaboration with Jean Erdman	Also won in 1958, 1964	
Creative Arts	Music Composition	Bohuslav Martinů	Mannes School of Music	Composing	Also won in 1953	
Creative Arts	Music Composition	Jan Meyerowitz		Composing	Also won in 1958	
Creative Arts	Music Composition	Julia Amanda Perry		Composing	Also won in 1954	
Creative Arts	Music Composition	George Rochberg	University of Pennsylvania, Theodore Presser	Composing	Also won in 1966	
Creative Arts	Music Composition	Seymour J. Shifrin	University of California, Berkeley	Composing	Also won in 1959	
Creative Arts	Music Composition	Vladimir Alexis Ussachevsky	Columbia University	Composing	Also won in 1960	
Creative Arts	Music Composition	Richard Kenelm Winslow	Wesleyan University	Composing		
Creative Arts	Photography	Robert Frank		Hungarian Revolution of 1956	Also won in 1955	
Creative Arts	Photography	William A. Garnett		Regional differences in California's geographical features	Also won in 1953, 1975	
Creative Arts	Photography	W. Eugene Smith		Pittsburgh	Also won in 1957, 1968	
Creative Arts	Photography	Todd Webb		The Oregon Trail	Also won in 1955	
Creative Arts	Poetry	Margaret Kirkland Avison	University of Toronto	Writing		
Creative Arts	Poetry	Barbara Gibbs Golffing	Bennington College	Writing	Also won in 1955	
Creative Arts	Poetry	Ned O'Gorman	Columbia University (MA student)	Writing	Also won in 1962	
Humanities	American Literature	Vivian Constance Hopkins	New York State College for Teachers	Influence of Francis Bacon on American thought in the first half of the 19th century		
Humanities	American Literature	Norman Holmes Pearson	Yale University	Nathaniel Hawthorne's letters	Also won in 1948	
Humanities	American Literature	Elizabeth Shepley Sergeant				
Humanities	American Literature	Thomas Anton Schafer	Duke University	Jonathan Edwards' Miscellanies as a source for the structure of his political thought		
Humanities	American Literature	James Leslie Woodress, Jr.	Butler University	Joel Barlow		
Humanities	Architecture, Planning and Design	Lewis Mumford	University of Pennsylvania	Development of cities as an aspect of modern civilization	Also won in 1932, 1938	
Humanities	Biography	Arthur McCandless Wilson	Dartmouth College	Biographies of Denis Diderot and Jean le Rond d'Alembert	Also won in 1939	
Humanities	British History	William Haller	Barnard College	Protestant propaganda during the reign of Queen Elizabeth I and its effects on English nationalism	Also won in 1947, 1950	
Humanities	British History	Gustave Lanctot	Ottawa University	Influence of the American Revolution on the people of Canada	Also won in 1957	
Humanities	British History	Wallace T. MacCaffrey	Haverford College	Development of the merchant class in Bristol, 1500–1640	Also won in 1982	
Humanities	British History	David Spring	Johns Hopkins University	Charles Wentworth-Fitzwilliam, 5th Earl Fitzwilliam		
Humanities	Classics	William Ayres Arrowsmith	University of California, Riverside	Role of the hero in Greek tragedy		
Humanities	Classics	Christopher Mounsey Dawson	Yale University	Early Greek lyric poetry and elegy		
Humanities	Classics	Glanville Downey	Dumbarton Oaks Research Library and Collection, Harvard University	History of Antioch on the Orontes		
Humanities	Classics	Charles Farwell Edson, Jr.	University of Wisconsin	Ancient history of Macedonia	Also won in 1936, 1937	
Humanities	Classics	Gordon Macdonald Kirkwood	Cornell University	History of lyric poetry of Ancient Greece		
Humanities	Classics	Bernard M. Knox	Yale University, Center for Hellenic Studies	Development of Sophocles' tragic vision illustrated in three plays		
Humanities	Classics	Matthew Immanuel Wiencke	Dartmouth College	Greek sculptural reliefs of the Archaic and Classical periods		
Humanities	Classics	Leonard Ernest Woodbury	University of Toronto	Protagoras of Abdera		
Humanities	East Asian Studies	Søren Egerod	University of California, Berkeley	Thai languages in Burma, especially Shan dialects		
Humanities	East Asian Studies	Richard Burroughs Mather	University of Minnesota	Buddhist influence in the writings of Chinese intellectuals of the fourth and fifth centuries A.D.		
Humanities	East Asian Studies	John Leon Mish	New York Public Library	"Literary and scientific activities of the Jesuits in Peking in the 17th and 18th centuries"		
Humanities	East Asian Studies	Nicholas N. Poppe	University of Washington	Mongolian manuscripts collected by Sir Aurel Stein		
Humanities	Economic History	David Granick	Fisk University	Soviet economic development, specifically in the metallurgy industry		
Humanities	English Literature	Walter Jackson Bate	Harvard University	John Keats	Also won in 1965	
Humanities	English Literature	Reuben Arthur Brower	Harvard University	Alexander Pope and poetic tradition	Also won in 1965	
Humanities	English Literature	Kathleen Coburn	University of Toronto	Samuel Taylor Coleridge's notebooks	Also won in 1953	
Humanities	English Literature	Roland Mushat Frye	Emory University	Christian life in William Langland, Edmund Spenser, John Milton, and John Bunyan	Also won in 1973	
Humanities	English Literature	Edgar Johnson	City College of New York		Also won in 1966	
Humanities	English Literature	Gwin Jackson Kolb	University of Chicago	Works by Samuel Johnson		
Humanities	English Literature	Kathleen Martha Lynch	Mount Holyoke College	Roger Boyle, 1st Earl of Orrery		
Humanities	English Literature	Frederick Ludwig Mulhauser	Pomona College	Religion in Victorian England		
Humanities	English Literature	Gordon Norton Ray	University of Illinois	H. G. Wells	Also won in 1941, 1942, 1945	
Humanities	English Literature	Samuel Schoenbaum	Northwestern University	Thomas Middleton	Also won in 1969	
Humanities	English Literature	Arthur Sherbo	University of Illinois	Christopher Smart		
Humanities	English Literature	Linda Van Norden	University of California, Davis	Literary imagination during the late English Renaissance		
Humanities	English Literature	Aubrey Lake Williams, Jr.	Yale University	Works of Alexander Pope		
Humanities	Fine Arts Research	Jack L. Benson	University of Pennsylvania	Archaic Greek art		
Humanities	Fine Arts Research	Justus Bier	University of Louisville	Tilman Riemenschneider and other Gothic German sculptors	Also won in 1953	
Humanities	Fine Arts Research	P. J. Conkwright, Jr.	Princeton University	The art of book design		
Humanities	Fine Arts Research	Louisa Dresser	Worcester Art Museum	American paintings before the Revolution		
Humanities	Fine Arts Research	Lorenz Eitner	University of Minnesota	German Romantic painting		
Humanities	Fine Arts Research	George Kubler	Yale University	Architecture of the Spanish and Portuguese empires, 1450–1800	Also won in 1943, 1952	
Humanities	Fine Arts Research	Charles Merrill Mount		Claude Monet		
Humanities	Fine Arts Research	Richard Offner	New York University			
Humanities	Fine Arts Research	Leona E. Prasse	Cleveland Museum of Art	Graphic work of Feininger		
Humanities	Fine Arts Research	David M. Robb	University of Pennsylvania	Manuscript illumination		
Humanities	Fine Arts Research	Seymour Slive	Harvard University	Frans Hals	Also won in 1978	
Humanities	Folklore and Popular Culture	Marius Barbeau	Université Laval		Also won in 1954	
Humanities	French Literature	Gilbert Chinard	Princeton University	History of European concepts relating to the USA	Also won in 1951	
Humanities	French Literature	Robert Greer Cohn	Vassar College	Literary development of several French writers	Also won in 1985	
Humanities	French Literature	William Roach	University of Pennsylvania		Also won in 1949	
Humanities	General Nonfiction	Redding Francis Perry	United States Army	2nd Armored Division in World War II		
Humanities	General Nonfiction	George William Potter	Providence Journal	Catholic Irish in America, 1820–1860		
Humanities	German and East European History	Hans Wilhelm Gatzke	Johns Hopkins University	Gustav Stresemann		
Humanities	German and East European History	Oscar Halecki	Fordham University	Slavic contribution to European culture		
Humanities	German and East European History	R. John Rath	University of Texas	Austrian government in Lombardy-Venetia		
Humanities	German and Scandinavian Literature	Heinz Bluhm	Yale University	Significance of Martin Luther for the early history of the printed Bible		
Humanities	German and Scandinavian Literature	Raymond M. Immerwahr	Washington University in St. Louis	Literary and cultural romanticism in German, French, and English literature		
Humanities	German and Scandinavian Literature	Egon Schwarz	Harvard University	Influence of German literature on the writings of the Generation of '98		
Humanities	German and Scandinavian Literature	Hans M. Wolff	University of California, Berkeley	Schopenhauer's philosophy		
Humanities	History of Science and Technology	I. Bernard Cohen	Harvard University	The development of Isaac Newton's scientific ideas and their influence in the 18th century		
Humanities	History of Science and Technology	Charles Mayo Goss	Louisiana State University	History of medicine in Ancient Greece		
Humanities	Iberian and Latin American History	Peter Muschamp Boyd-Bowman	Kalamazoo College	Regional origins of Spanish colonizers in America in the 16th century		
Humanities	Linguistics	Mark J. Dresden	University of Pennsylvania		Also won in 1954	
Humanities	Linguistics	Murray B. Emeneau	University of California, Berkeley	Dravidian linguistics	Also won in 1949	
Humanities	Linguistics	Robert Louis Politzer	Harvard University	Italian phonology		
Humanities	Linguistics	Paul Serruys	Saint Mary's College High School	Chinese language of the Han dynasty		
Humanities	Linguistics	Max Weinreich	City College of New York		Also won in 1955	
Humanities	Literary Criticism	John Arthos	University of Michigan	The sublime in the criticism of poetry		
Humanities	Literary Criticism	Herschel Clay Baker	Harvard University	William Hazlitt	Also won in 1963	
Humanities	Literary Criticism	Wayne Clayson Booth	Earlham College	Problems of narrative form	Also won in 1969	
Humanities	Literary Criticism	Albert J. Guerard	Harvard University	Works of Joseph Conrad		
Humanities	Literary Criticism	William Hugh Kenner	University of California, Santa Barbara		Also won in 1963	
Humanities	Literary Criticism	Murray Krieger	University of Minnesota		Also won in 1961	
Humanities	Literary Criticism	René Wellek	Yale University	History of modern literary criticism	Also won in 1951, 1952, 1966	
Humanities	Medieval History	Marvin Burton Becker	University of Michigan, Baldwin-Wallace College	History of representative government in Florence in the fourteenth century		
Humanities	Medieval History	Peter Charanis	Rutgers University	Social structure of the Byzantine Empire"		
Humanities	Medieval History	Tryggvi Julius Oleson	University of Manitoba	Edward the Confessor		
Humanities	Medieval History	Felix Reichmann	Cornell University	Book trade in medieval Italy		
Humanities	Medieval History	John Joseph Ryan, Jr.	St. John's Seminary, Pontifical Institute of Medieval Studies	Gregorian Reform		
Humanities	Medieval History	Brian Tierney	Catholic University of America	Ecclesiastical law concerning the relief of poverty in the Middle Ages	Also won in 1955	
Humanities	Medieval History	William L. Winter	Teachers College of Connecticut	Development of the Hanseatic League as an example of European supranational organization		
Humanities	Medieval Literature	Harry Caplan	Cornell University	Medieval rhetoric	Also won in 1928	
Humanities	Medieval Literature	Margaret W. Pepperdene	Miami University	Christian elements in Beowulf		
Humanities	Medieval Literature	Paul Ruggiers	University of Oklahoma	Geoffrey Chaucer		
Humanities	Music Research	Yury Arbatsky			Also won in 1955	
Humanities	Music Research	Nathan Broder		History of orchestral music		
Humanities	Music Research	Hans Theodor David	University of Michigan	Instrumental ensemble music of the late Renaissance		
Humanities	Music Research	Leo Franz Schrade	Yale University	Polyphonic music of the 14th century	Also won in 1949, 1951	
Humanities	Near Eastern Studies	Henry George Fischer	University of Pennsylvania Museum	Provincial government in Egypt prior to the Middle Kingdom		
Humanities	Near Eastern Studies	Benno Landsberger			Also won in 1953	
Humanities	Philosophy	Karl Aschenbrenner	University of California, Berkeley	Principle of coherence in art		
Humanities	Philosophy	George Boas	Johns Hopkins University	Presuppositions of Aristotle		
Humanities	Philosophy	Stuart MacDonald Brown, Jr.	Cornell University	Philosophical study of the theory of inalienable rights		
Humanities	Philosophy	Emil Ludwig Fackenheim	University of Toronto	Development of the philosophy of religion from Kant to Kierkegaard		
Humanities	Philosophy	Glenn Raymond Morrow	University of Pennsylvania		Also won in 1952	
Humanities	Philosophy	John Daniel Wild, Jr.	Harvard University	Philosophical anthropology	Also won in 1930	
Humanities	Philosophy	Frederick D. Wilhelmsen	University of Santa Clara			
Humanities	Renaissance History	Daniel C. Boughner	Evansville College	Ben Jonson's debt to the Italian Renaissance	Also won in 1958	
Humanities	Renaissance History	William Garrett Crane	City College of New York			
Humanities	Renaissance History	Paul Alfred Jorgensen	University of California, Los Angeles			
Humanities	Renaissance History	Robert Starr Kinsman	University of California, Los Angeles			
Humanities	Renaissance History	Lewis William Spitz	University of Missouri	Religious thought of certain German Renaissance humanists		
Humanities	Russian History	Josef Korbel	University of Denver	Impact of Soviet-German relations in the countries located between the Soviet Union and Germany		
Humanities	Russian History	Wacław Lednicki	University of California, Berkeley	Pre-Soviet cultural and political trends in Russia and Poland	Also won in 1955	
Humanities	Russian History	Richard Edgar Pipes	Harvard University	Ideas and social bases of Russian conservatism from its emergence at the end of the 18th century to 1917	Also won in 1965	
Humanities	Russian History	Adam Bruno Ulam	Harvard University	Development of Marxian socialism in the West and in Russia	Also won in 1969	
Humanities	Spanish and Portuguese Literature	Lloyd A. W. Kasten	University of Wisconsin–Madison	Alfonso the Wise		
Humanities	Theatre Arts	Leo Hughes	University of Texas at Austin			
Humanities	Theatre Arts	Alan Leo Schneider				
Humanities	United States History	Richard Bardolph	University of North Carolina at Greensboro	African-American history		
Humanities	United States History	Moshe Davis	Jewish Theological Seminary of America	Elements of Jewish tradition in America and the effects of American experience on it		
Humanities	United States History	Wilma Dykeman Stokely		American Civil War		
Humanities	United States History	Shelby Foote		American Civil War	Also won in 1955, 1959	
Humanities	United States History	John Haskell Kemble	Pomona College	Maritime history of the Pacific Coast		
Humanities	United States History	James Hastings Nichols	University of Chicago	19th century American intellectual and religious history		
Humanities	United States History	Earl S. Pomeroy	University of Oregon	History of Pacific Coast states	Also won in 1971	
Humanities	United States History	William S. Powell	University of North Carolina Library	Explorers and colonizers who came from England to present-day North Carolina in the 16th century		
Humanities	United States History	Paul McDonald Robinett	U. S. Army	Army transport overseas and battle participation of an armored regimental task force in World War II		
Humanities	United States History	T. Harry Williams	Louisiana State University	Huey Long's career		
Natural Science	Astrophysics and Astronomy	John Gardner Phillips	University of California, Berkeley	Photometric study of emission lines in long-period variable stars to learn about the physical conditions in the stars' atmosphere		
Natural Science	Astrophysics and Astronomy	Zdeněk Sekera	University of California, Los Angeles		Also won in 1960	
Natural Science	Chemistry	Gene Blakely Carpenter	Brown University	The least squares refinement technique in crystal structure determination by means of X-rays		
Natural Science	Chemistry	Vernon H. Cheldelin	Oregon State College	Medical biochemistry		
Natural Science	Chemistry	Elias James Corey	University of Illinois	New synthetic methods based on biosynthetic principles	Also won in 1968	
Natural Science	Chemistry	Frank Albert Cotton	Massachusetts Institute of Technology	Chemistry of metal derivatives of cyclopentadiene	Also won in 1989	
Natural Science	Chemistry	Walter Francis Richard Edgell	Purdue University	Infrared spectra of certain metal carbonyl hydrides		
Natural Science	Chemistry	W. Conard Fernelius	Pennsylvania State University	Stability of coordination compounds in solution		
Natural Science	Chemistry	Joseph J. Katz	Argonne National Laboratory			
Natural Science	Chemistry	Walter Joseph Kauzmann	Princeton University	Protein denaturation	Also won in 1974	
Natural Science	Chemistry	John Edgar Kilpatrick	Rice Institute			
Natural Science	Chemistry	Robert L. Letsinger	Northwestern University	Chemistry of quaternary phosphonium salts and tertiary phosphines		
Natural Science	Chemistry	Arthur John Madden, Jr.	University of Minnesota			
Natural Science	Chemistry	William Leitch Marshall, Jr.	Oak Ridge National Laboratory	Molecular interaction by the use of high pressure techniques		
Natural Science	Chemistry	Kurt Martin Mislow	New York University		Also won in 1974	
Natural Science	Chemistry	Donald S. Noyce	University of California, Berkeley	Acid catalysis and reaction mechanism		
Natural Science	Chemistry	Robert Louis Pecsok	University of California, Los Angeles			
Natural Science	Chemistry	Christian S. Rondestvedt, Jr.	University of Michigan	Reactions of carbon-carbon unsaturation		
Natural Science	Chemistry	Harold Abraham Scheraga	Cornell University	Internal configuration of proteins	Also won in 1962	
Natural Science	Chemistry	William E. Truce	Purdue University	Stereochemistry of nucleophilic additions to acetylenes		
Natural Science	Earth Science	Olof Arrhenius	Scripps Institution of Oceanography			
Natural Science	Earth Science	Arthur J. Boucot	United States Geological Survey	Silurian/Devonian rocks of Western Europe		
Natural Science	Earth Science	Siemon William Muller	Stanford University	Paleontology and geological survey in Austria		
Natural Science	Earth Science	Francis Asbury Richards	Woods Hole Oceanographic Institution	Biochemical and hydrochemical cycles in the Eastern North Atlantic Ocean		
Natural Science	Earth Science	Harry Blackmore Whittington	Harvard University	The zonal stratigraphy and fossil faunas of the Bala Area of North Wales		
Natural Science	Earth Science	Robert W. Wilson	University of Kansas			
Natural Science	Engineering	Adam Abruzzi	Stevens Institute of Technology	Effect of industrial codes and industrial technology in Italy on the theory of work		
Natural Science	Engineering	Israel I. Cornet	University of California, Berkeley	Corrosion fatigue and rate factors in stress corrosion		
Natural Science	Engineering	Thomas Paton Goodman	Massachusetts Institute of Technology	Recent German advances in automatic control engineering		
Natural Science	Engineering	Joseph Marin	Pennsylvania State University	Mechanics of the solid state		
Natural Science	Engineering	Herbert Mark Neustadt	U.S. Naval Academy		Also won in 1957	
Natural Science	Engineering	Milton Clayton Shaw	Massachusetts Institute of Technology	Problem of wear on metal cutting tools		
Natural Science	Engineering	Leonid Michael Tichvinsky	University of California, Berkeley	Laws of dry and boundary friction		
Natural Science	Engineering	George Winter	Cornell University	Structural engineering		
Natural Science	Mathematics	Edward William Barankin	University of California, Berkeley	Quantitative study of human behavior		
Natural Science	Mathematics	Julian David Cole	California Institute of Technology			
Natural Science	Mathematics	Sidney Davidson	University of Chicago	Comparison of governmental policies on depreciation accounting in the USA, UK, France, and Sweden		
Natural Science	Mathematics	Wolfgang Heinrich Fuchs	Cornell University	Deficient values of meromorphic functions of finite order		
Natural Science	Mathematics	Edwin E. Moise	University of Michigan	Classical problems in the topology of higher-dimensional Euclidean manifolds		
Natural Science	Mathematics	Clifford Ambrose Truesdell, III	Indiana University	History of the mathematical theory of elasticity		
Natural Science	Medicine and Health	Donald Leslie Augustine	Harvard University			
Natural Science	Medicine and Health	Brian Francis Hoffman	Columbia University			
Natural Science	Molecular and Cellular Biology	Edward Allen Adelberg	University of California, Berkeley	Study of microbial genetics and metabolism	Also won in 1965	
Natural Science	Molecular and Cellular Biology	Max Alfert	University of California, Berkeley	Cytochemical studies of the basic proteins of cell nuclei		
Natural Science	Molecular and Cellular Biology	David M. Bonner	Yale University	Genetic control of enzyme formation		
Natural Science	Molecular and Cellular Biology	Allan Harvey Brown	University of Pennsylvania, University of Minnesota	Botany		
Natural Science	Molecular and Cellular Biology	Arthur LeRoy Cohen	Oglethorpe University	Electron microscope of protoplasmic molecular orientation		
Natural Science	Molecular and Cellular Biology	Melvin Martin Green	University of California, Davis	Pseudo-parallelism and its effect on the nature of the gene	Also won in 1968	
Natural Science	Molecular and Cellular Biology	Seymour Putterman Halbert	Columbia University			
Natural Science	Molecular and Cellular Biology	Nathan Kaliss	Roscoe B. Jackson Memorial Laboratory	The biological processes underlying the immune reactions of the host to tumor homografts		
Natural Science	Molecular and Cellular Biology	Martin David Kamen	Washington University School of Medicine	Function and structure of hematin compounds in photosynthesis	Also won in 1972	
Natural Science	Molecular and Cellular Biology	Milton Levy	New York University			
Natural Science	Molecular and Cellular Biology	Nicholas Nicolaides	University of Chicago	Measuring the length of molecules	Also won in 1955	
Natural Science	Molecular and Cellular Biology	Harold E. Pearson	University of Southern California School of Medicine, Los Angeles County Hospital	Conducted research at the Institut Pasteur		
Natural Science	Molecular and Cellular Biology	Donald Montgomery Reynolds	University of California, Davis	Purification of microbial chitinase		
Natural Science	Molecular and Cellular Biology	Sidney Roberts	University of California, Los Angeles Medical Center			
Natural Science	Molecular and Cellular Biology	Howard K. Schachman	University of California, Berkeley	Degradation of macromolecules		
Natural Science	Molecular and Cellular Biology	David Shemin	Columbia University	Biosynthesis of porphyrins and related compounds, including vitamin B12	Also won in 1970	
Natural Science	Molecular and Cellular Biology	Clara M. Szego	University of California, Los Angeles	New micromethods for separating and identifying protein and steroid hormones		
Natural Science	Molecular and Cellular Biology	Charles Tanford	State University of Iowa	Improvement of the theoretical treatment of the acid-base properties of proteins		
Natural Science	Molecular and Cellular Biology	Cornelius A. Tobias	University of California, Berkeley	Biological effects of radiation on processes of growth and cell division		
Natural Science	Molecular and Cellular Biology	Heinz von Foerster	University of Illinois at Urbana-Champaign	Possible models of the input and output mechanism of information transfer from the nervous network to the memory	Also won in 1963	
Natural Science	Organismic Biology and Ecology	Huai Chang Chiang	University of Minnesota, Duluth	Conducted research at Cambridge University		
Natural Science	Organismic Biology and Ecology	Philip Jackson Darlington, Jr	Harvard University	Australian Carabidae beetles	Also won in 1947	
Natural Science	Organismic Biology and Ecology	William Hanna Elder	University of Missouri-Columbia	The nēnē goose of the Hawaiian islands		
Natural Science	Organismic Biology and Ecology	Perry Webster Gilbert	Cornell University	Shark reproduction	Also won in 1963	
Natural Science	Organismic Biology and Ecology	I. Michael Lerner	University of California, Berkeley	Principles of artificial selection animal and plant breeding	Also won in 1947, 1952	
Natural Science	Organismic Biology and Ecology	Cornelis Adrianus Gerrit Wiersma	California Institute of Technology			
Natural Science	Physics	Stewart D. Bloom	Lawrence Livermore Laboratory, University of California, Davis	Conducted research at the University of Cambridge with Max Perutz and Wolfgang Pauli		
Natural Science	Physics	Harvey Brooks	Harvard University	Foundations of solid state physics		
Natural Science	Physics	Theodore Enns	Johns Hopkins University	Conducted research at the University of Oslo		
Natural Science	Physics	Sherman Frankel	University of Pennsylvania		Also won in 1978	
Natural Science	Physics	William Frederick Fry	University of Wisconsin–Madison	Properties of unstable particles in nuclear fragments		
Natural Science	Physics	Harry Wilks Fulbright	University of Rochester	Nuclear physics		
Natural Science	Physics	John David Jackson	McGill University	Theoretical study of nuclear reactions		
Natural Science	Physics	Myron A. Jeppesen	Bowdoin College	Optical studies on surface and body properties of crystalline and amorphous solids		
Natural Science	Physics	Charles Kittel	University of California, Berkeley	Solid state physics	Also won in 1945, 1963	
Natural Science	Physics	James Stark Koehler	University of Illinois at Urbana-Champaign	Dislocations and plastic deformation		
Natural Science	Physics	Ralph Stuart Mackay, Jr.	University of California, Berkeley, University of California Medical Center	Unobservable detail in X-ray images	Also won in 1957	
Natural Science	Physics	Mael A. Melvin	Florida State University	Application of generalized symmetry to electrodynamics and quantum physics	Also won in 1951	
Natural Science	Physics	Russell Allen Peck, Jr.	Brown University	Nuclear shell phenomena and selection rules near atomic number 5		
Natural Science	Physics	Gerald Cleveland Phillips	Rice Institute	Conducted research at the University of Cambridge		
Natural Science	Physics	John Hamilton Reynolds	University of California, Berkeley	Fundamental particles and nuclear emulsion techniques	Also won in 1986	
Natural Science	Physics	William S. Rodney	National Bureau of Standards	Optics		
Natural Science	Physics	Clemens Carel Johannes Roothaan	University of Chicago	Molecular calculations		
Natural Science	Physics	Malvin Avram Ruderman	University of California, Berkeley	Quantum field theory	Also won in 1979	
Natural Science	Physics	David S. Saxon	University of California, Los Angeles		Also won in 1961	
Natural Science	Physics	Leonard Isaac Schiff	Stanford University	Theoretical physics		
Natural Science	Physics	Fred Henry Schmidt	University of Washington			
Natural Science	Physics	Robert Serber	Columbia University			
Natural Science	Physics	Raymond Sheline	Florida State University	Nuclear chemistry	Also won in 1955, 1964	
Natural Science	Physics	Jack Steinberger	Columbia University	Elementary particle physics		
Natural Science	Physics	Joseph Ward Straley	University of North Carolina at Chapel Hill	Measurement and interpretation of the intensities of infrared absorption bands		
Natural Science	Physics	Georges Maxime Temmer	Carnegie Institution of Washington	Coulomb excitation in low-lying excited states of nuclei		
Natural Science	Physics	Felix Marc Hermann Villars	Massachusetts Institute of Technology	High-energy elementary particle physics		
Natural Science	Physics	Victor Frederick Weisskopf	Massachusetts Institute of Technology			
Natural Science	Plant Science	Edgar Anderson	Washington University in St. Louis, Shaw's Garden	New method for obtaining valid conclusions from complex statistical data	Also won in 1943, 1950	
Natural Science	Plant Science	Spencer Wharton Brown	University of California, Berkeley	Tapetal cytology of the banana and other tropical plants		
Natural Science	Plant Science	John Thomas Curtis	University of Wisconsin	Vegetation of Wisconsin	Also won in 1942	
Natural Science	Plant Science	Ralph Emerson	University of California, Berkeley	Tropical water molds	Also won in 1948	
Natural Science	Plant Science	Thomas H. Goodspeed	University of California Botanical Garden		Also won in 1930, 1935	
Natural Science	Plant Science	Sigurd W. Melsted	University of Illinois	Chemistry of manganese in soils		
Natural Science	Plant Science	Alf Erling Porsild	Canadian National Museum of Science	East Asian arctic plants		
Natural Science	Plant Science	Kanjyo Sakimura	Bishop Museum, University of Hawaii at Manoa, Pineapple Research Institute of Hawai'i	Transmission of plants virus diseases by thrips		
Natural Science	Plant Science	Charles Arthur Schroeder	University of California, Los Angeles			
Natural Science	Plant Science	Clarence Sterling	University of California, Davis	Relationship of submicroscopic structure of rheological properties in certain plant polysaccharides	Also won in 1963	
Natural Science	Statistics	Joseph Lawson Hodges, Jr.	University of California, Berkeley	Use of combinatorial analysis in mathematical statistics		
Social Sciences	Anthropology and Cultural Studies	Oscar Lewis	University of Illinois	Urbanization effects in Mexico City on peasant families	Also won in 1962	
Social Sciences	Anthropology and Cultural Studies	Robert Lawrence Rands	University of Mississippi	Mayan ceramics excavated from Palenque		
Social Sciences	Economics	William Jack Baumol	Princeton University, New York University	Theory of economic development		
Social Sciences	Economics	E. Cary Brown	Massachusetts Institute of Technology	Theory and measurement of automatic fiscal stabilization in the USA and other countries		
Social Sciences	Economics	Robert Aaron Gordon	University of California, Berkeley	American business cycles in the interwar period and of the forces making for instability and growth in the West European economy		
Social Sciences	Economics	William Jaffé	Northwestern University	Leon Walras		
Social Sciences	Economics	Earl R. Rolph	University of California, Berkeley	Debt management practice of national American, British, and French governments since 1920"		
Social Sciences	Economics	Jacob Schmookler	Michigan State University	Socio-economic roots of inventive activity in the American shoe industry		
Social Sciences	Law	Thomas Edward Davitt	Marquette University	Concept of natural law		
Social Sciences	Law	Myron Piper Gilmore	Harvard University	Legal humanism in the 15th and 16th centuries		
Social Sciences	Law	Stephan Kuttner	Catholic University of America	Medieval canon law	Also won in 1966	
Social Sciences	Law	Kurt Hans Nadelmann	New York University	History of the development of the rules of conflict of laws in the United States		
Social Sciences	Law	Samuel E. Thorne	Harvard University		Also won in 1948, 1951	
Social Sciences	Political Science	Rupert Emerson	Harvard University	The development in recent decades of the nationalist movements of non-white peoples of the world	Also won in 1953	
Social Sciences	Political Science	Joseph Pratt Harris	University of California, Berkeley	Parliamentary control of administration in Great Britain		
Social Sciences	Political Science	Ruth Catherine Lawson	Mount Holyoke College	The problem of collective security in Europe since 1945		
Social Sciences	Political Science	Felix Oppenheim	University of Delaware	Wrote prior political science research as a book		
Social Sciences	Psychology	Mason Haire	University of California, Berkeley	Influence of cultural factors on the motivation of industrial workers		
Social Sciences	Sociology	Edward P. Hutchinson	University of Pennsylvania	Socioeconomic significance in population growth	Also won in 1941	
Social Sciences	Sociology	Richard David Lambert	University of Pennsylvania	Work ethic of industrial laborers in India		
Social Sciences	Sociology	Roland Leslie Warren	Alfred University	Voluntary citizen participation in Germany		

== 1956 Latin American and Caribbean Fellows ==
Category	Field of Study	Fellow	Institutional association	Research topic	Notes	Ref
Creative Arts	Fine Arts	Geoffrey Lamont Holder	Metropolitan Opera Ballet	Painting		
Creative Arts	Fine Arts	Lorenzo Homar	Puerto Rico Department of Education	Painting		
Creative Arts	Music Composition	Carlos Botto Vallarino	University of Chile	Composing		
Humanities	Iberian and Latin American History	John Horace Parry	University of Ibadan		Also won in 1952	
Humanities	Music Research	José Maceda	University of the Philippines			
Natural Science	Astronomy and Astrophysics	Pedro E. Zadunaisky		Maxtrix iterative methods	Also won in 1977	
Natural Science	Earth Science	Esteban Boltovsky	Bernardino Rivadavia Natural Sciences Argentine Museum	Submarine foraminifera in Patagonia		
Natural Science	Mathematics	Samuel Barocio Barrios	National Institute of Scientific Investigation			
Natural Science	Mathematics	Günter Lumer		Research at the University of Chicago		
Natural Science	Mathematics	Orlando Eugenio Villamayor	National University of Cuyo			
Natural Science	Medicine and Health	Tulio Pizzi	University of Chile		Also won in 1958	
Natural Science	Medicine and Health	Juan Francisco Recalde	National University of Asunción			
Natural Science	Molecular and Cellular Biology	Amadeu Cury	University of Brasília, National Council for Scientific and Technological Development	Biochemical activities of bacteria		
Natural Science	Molecular and Cellular Biology	José Ramírez de Arellano	National Institute of Cardiology		Also won in 1955	
Natural Science	Molecular and Cellular Biology	Adolfo Max Rothschild	Biological Institute of São Paulo	histamine biochemistry	Also won in 1957	
Natural Science	Molecular and Cellular Biology	Carmen C. Velasquez	University of the Philippines		Also won in 1962	
Natural Science	Molecular and Cellular Biology	Rodrigo Zeledón Araya	University of Costa Rica	Research at Johns Hopkins University	Also won in 1959	
Natural Science	Organismic Biology and Ecology	J. Enrique Avila Laguna		The application of ecological research in mathematics	Also won in 1955	
Natural Science	Organismic Biology and Ecology	Alceu Lemos de Castro	National Museum, Rio de Janeiro	Certain crustaceans in Brazil		
Natural Science	Organismic Biology and Ecology	Dioscoro S. Rabor	Silliman University		Also won in 1950	
Natural Science	Organismic Biology and Ecology	Alfredo de la Torre y Callejas	IES La Matanza	Caribbean molluscs	Also won in 1955	
Natural Science	Physics	Luis Münch Paniagua	Tonantzintla Observatory	Radial velocity determination and spectral classification of O-type and high-luminosity stars		
Natural Science	Plant Science	Jaime Díaz Moreno	Universidad de Guayaquil	Vegetable pathology with special reference to potato diseases		
Natural Science	Plant Science	Victor Manuel Patiño Rodríguez	Oficina de Investigaciones Agricolas de Bogota	History of agriculture and cattle in Western Colombia	Also won in 1955, 1965	
Natural Science	Plant Science	José Ploper	Tucumán Agricultural Experiment Center, National University of Tucumán	Plant hybridization	Also won in 1960	
Natural Science	Plant Science	Gregorio T. Velasquez	University of the Philippines			
Social Science	Anthropology and Cultural Studies	Aquiles Escalante Polo	University of Atlántico			
Social Science	Anthropology and Cultural Studies	Alberto Rex González	National University of La Plata, National University of the Littoral		Also won in 1966, 1967	

== See also ==
- Guggenheim Fellowship
- List of Guggenheim Fellowships awarded in 1955
- List of Guggenheim Fellowships awarded in 1957
