= Thunder in the Glens =

Scottish annual Harley-Davidson bike rally

Thunder in the Glens is an annual Harley-Davidson bike rally held in Aviemore, Scotland, established in 1996. The event is run by the Dunedin Chapter Scotland (#9083) of the Harley Owners Group (HOG), based in Edinburgh. Running over the last weekend of August every year, the event consists of Harley-Davidson displays, rallies and live music. Scottish rock band Big Country, and band RPJ performed at the 2016 festival. People travel from around the world to attend.

Thunder in the Glens is currently the largest HOG chapter rally in the United Kingdom and Europe. Although mainly for Harley-Davidson bikes, the event is open to all bikers.

Thunder was created by Bob Watson, a founding member of Dunedin Chapter, in 1996 when the only Harley-Davidson shop at the time "Alvins" was based in Edinburgh. Following the success of Dunedin's first rally, organised by Bob, in Pitlochry "The Faskally Rally" and a solo 3,000 mile trip in the States which included at trip to Sturgis, Bob came up with the idea of an equivalent Scottish rally.

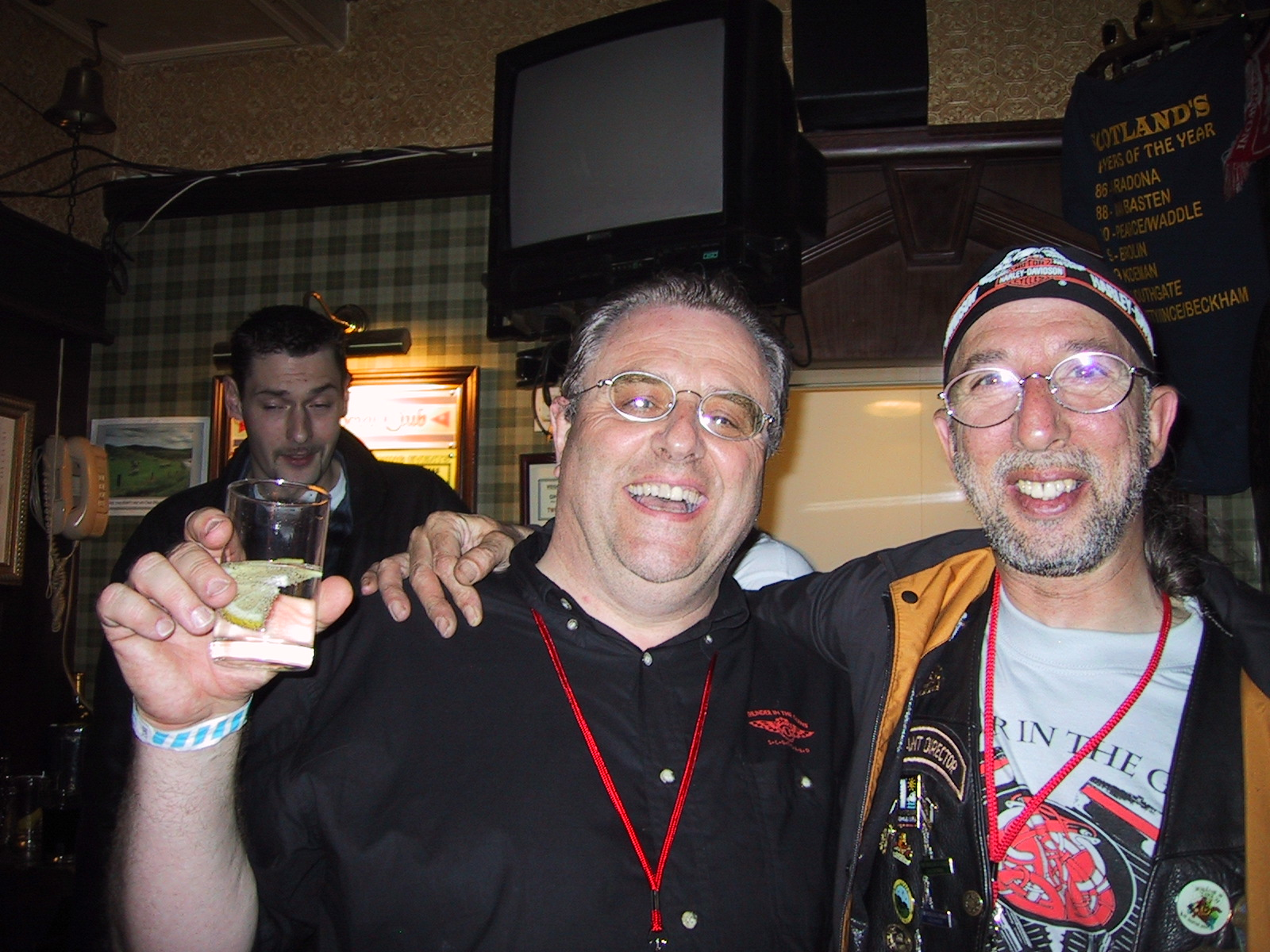
Bob Watson and Stuart Caplan at Thunder in 2002

In the 1970's Aviemore, situated in the Highlands of Scotland, had been a major tourist hub particularly for skiing. But, due to the A9 bypass, like many towns off Route 66 in the US, it had fallen on fairly hard times but Bob saw a way to revitalise the Aviemore economy. He organised a series of meetings with local hoteliers, business people and the tourist board and firstly gained their support for the event. At that point though, there was no guarantee that Harley-Davidson UK would go along with the idea of a rally held "way up north". However, following further discussions with Alastair and Vince from Alvins along with meetings with Harley-Davidson UK, agreement was reached that the UK National Rally would be held in Aviemore in 1997. And hence, Thunder in the Glens or, as it was subtitled then, "The Sturgis of the North" was born.

The rally on the Saturday consists of an organised ride from Aviemore through the Scottish Highlands to Grantown on Spey.

When the event first started, there were around 500 participants in the rally. In 2015, there was over 3000 bikers, and by 2016, it rose to 4000.

There are over 60 charity stands at the event, as well as opportunities to test bikes and Jeep cars. The profits from Thunder go to local charities.

Thunder in the Glans 1997 to 2002 by Norrie Brown

The event is said to substantially boost the local economy of the town of Aviemore. It was suggested the event contributed £15million to the Aviemore economy in 2016. Although local residents were initially hesitant about the event, nervous the bikers would be similar to those depicted in films such as The Wild One, the bikers are now welcomed into the town every year. Video created in 2003 to celebrate the first five years of Thunder in the Glens. Dedicated here to the memory of Norrie Brown, the original creator, who sadly passed some years ago, video guru when everyone else was just playing at it and one of the nicest guys ever to grace this planet.....

In 2017, Thunder in the Glens celebrated its 20th anniversary and in 2025 shows no sign of stopping any time soon.
