= Larry King Live =

American television talk show

- Genre: Talk show
- Created by: Larry King
- Presented by: Larry King
- Country of origin: United States
- No. of seasons: 20
- No. of episodes: 6,120

Production
- Running time: 60 minutes

Original release
- Network: CNN
- Release: June 3, 1985 – December 16, 2010

Related
- Piers Morgan Live

Larry King Live is an American television talk show that aired on CNN from June 3, 1985, to December 16, 2010. Hosted by Larry King, it was the network's most watched and longest-running program, with over one million viewers nightly.

Mainly aired from CNN's Los Angeles studios, the show was sometimes broadcast from the CNN Center in Atlanta, from the Time Warner Center in New York City, or from Washington, D.C., where King had gained national prominence during his years as a radio interviewer on the Larry King Show for the Mutual Broadcasting System. Every night, King interviewed one or more prominent individuals, usually celebrities, politicians and businesspeople.

The one-hour show was broadcast three times a day in some areas, and was seen all over the world on CNN International.

On June 29, 2010, King announced that the program would end. The final episode aired on December 16, but a new episode on the war against cancer aired two days later on December 18.

Larry King Live was replaced by Piers Morgan Tonight, a talk show hosted by British television personality and journalist Piers Morgan, that began airing on January 17, 2011. It was renamed to Piers Morgan Live in 2013, and ran its last episode on March 28, 2014, after being cancelled. In October 2023, CNN premiered Laura Coates Live; while its host Laura Coates described it as a spiritual successor to Larry King Live (citing her adoration of King's "intimate" style), and uses graphics evoking the look and feel of the show, Laura Coates Live utilizes an opinion journalism-based format similar to other CNN primetime programs and is otherwise unrelated.

== Format ==
=== Interview style ===
Larry King mainly conducted interviews from the studio, but he also interviewed people on-site in the White House, their prison cells, their homes, and other unique locations. Critics claimed that Larry King asked "soft" questions in comparison to other interviewers, which allowed him to reach guests who would be averse to interviewing on "tough" talk shows. His reputation for asking easy, open-ended questions made him attractive to important figures who wanted to state their position while avoiding being challenged on contentious topics. When interviewed on Late Night with Conan O'Brien, King said that the secret to a good interview is to get the guest to talk about him- or herself, and to put oneself in the background pool.

A 1996 interview in The Washington Post saw King note that he sometimes slips hard questions in between softballs. King prefers one-sentence questions. In interviews, King has also proclaimed that he prepares as little as possible for each program, does not read the books of the authors he interviews, and admitted that the show was not journalism but "infotainment". He said that he tries to project an image of earnestness and sincerity in each interview, and the format of the show (King in suspenders instead of suit and tie, sitting directly next to the guest) reinforces that.

In response to "'softball' questions" accusations, King says, "I've never understood that. All I've tried to do is ask the best questions I could think of, listen to the answers, and then follow up. I've never not followed up. I don't attack anybody – that's not my style – but I follow up. I've asked people who say this, 'What's a softball question?' They'll say, 'You say to some movie star, what's your next project?' To me, that's not a softball. To me, that's interesting – what are you doing next?"

=== Call-ins ===
King accepted call-in questions on some nights. Callers were identified only by city and state/province, and generally not by name. Occasionally, surprise guests telephoned the show and comment, like governors, royalty, and celebrities. At times, prank calls came in.

=== Frequent topics ===
During major election coverage, the program may center on political analysis and commentary, as the show's prime time airing generally coincides with the closing of polls in many states. Larry King would air generally near the end of each hour with various guests during election coverage while hosting a panel at the end of the night which is midnight eastern the usual time slot for the show's daily repeat outside of live election coverage.

One of King's recurring topics is the paranormal. A frequent guest is John Edward of the popular television show Crossing Over with John Edward. Edward comes on the show and gives callers a free chance to supposedly communicate, via him, with their dead loved ones. King also had alleged psychics such as Sylvia Browne and James Van Praagh on from time to time to do readings and discuss the future. King sometimes allows skeptics such as James Randi to debate the psychics. In an April 2005 episode, King hosted a panel discussion regarding Evangelical, Catholic, Jewish, Muslim, and atheist views on the afterlife. King has also had topics about UFOs and Extraterrestrials where he goes on to pit them one against the other, believers views on the afterlife against skeptics.

King is also frequently accused of pandering to sensationalist news stories; for instance, the death of Anna Nicole Smith took up much of King's shows after the event, causing the cancellation of numerous guests and interviews that were already scheduled, most notably Christopher Hitchens, who had intended to discuss the Iraq situation.

After the death of a prominent celebrity, King would either replay a recent program featuring said celebrity (for instance, after actor Don Knotts' death in 2006 King replayed the interview with Knotts and Andy Griffith taken several months before) or will bring on family members and close confidantes to the deceased to reminisce on the departed's life.

=== Set design ===
Each studio set features an identical colored-dot map of the world in the background and one of King's trademarks, a vintage RCA microphone (as seen in the title card), on the desk. The microphone is a prop, as King and his guests use lapel microphones.

== Notable episodes ==
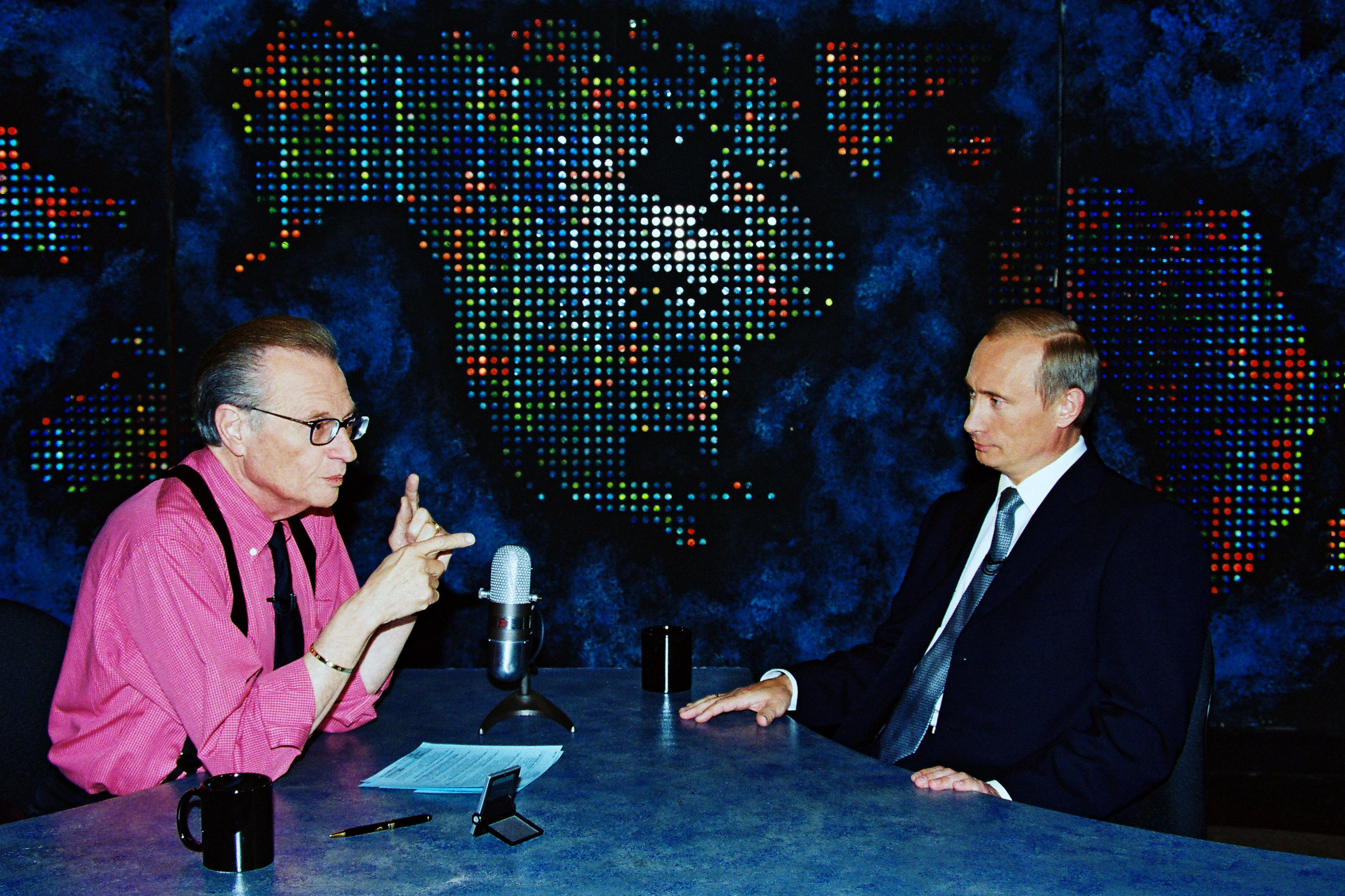
King interviewing Russian President Vladimir Putin, September 8, 2000.

- On June 3, 1985, Larry King Live debuted on CNN, with then-Governor of New York Mario Cuomo as King's first guest. The legacy of Mario Cuomo as the 52nd Governor of New York led to his being dubbed "Hamlet on the Hudson".
- In 1990, Minister Louis Farrakhan (the Nation of Islam leader) appeared as a guest for the first time on Larry King Live.
- The November 9, 1993 debate between Ross Perot and Al Gore on the North American Free Trade Agreement was watched in 11.174 million households – the largest audience ever for a program on an ad-supported cable network until the October 23, 2006 New York Giants-Dallas Cowboys game on ESPN's Monday Night Football.
- On October 7, 1994, actor Marlon Brando was interviewed from his home to promote his autobiography Songs My Mother Taught Me. Towards the end, Brando gave a kiss to King on the lips.
- On September 8, 2000, Russian President Vladimir Putin was interviewed.
- On September 25, 2006, Oprah Winfrey made her first endorsement of Barack Obama for President of the United States on Larry King Live. Two economists estimate that Winfrey's endorsement was worth over a million votes in the Democratic primary race and that without it, Obama would have lost the nomination.
- To mark the 20th anniversary of the show, ABC's Barbara Walters was a guest host and interviewed King on his reflections of his career.
- To mark King's 50 years in broadcasting, Larry King Live had a week-long celebration that included a two-hour 'CNN Presents' special and an hour of celebrity toast. The broadcast of this special week-long event was postponed due to the tragedy at Virginia Tech. XM Satellite Radio also featured a micro channel called "Larry!" that featured replays of the show along with interviews and the new material from the CNN anniversary shows.
- On July 9, 2007, a special edition of Larry King Live focusing on the fallout from the murder–suicide of Chris Benoit was aired, with King interviewing WWE wrestlers Steve Blackman, John Cena, Ted DiBiase, Bret Hart, and Chris Jericho.
- On July 19, 2007, a frail Tammy Faye Messner made her final appearance on Larry King Live to talk about her battle with lung and colon cancer. She died the following day.
- On September 7, 2009, the first episode in high definition was aired.
- On February 12, 2010, during a discussion on Bill Clinton's latest heart procedure, Larry King revealed he had undergone a similar operation five weeks earlier. King had a heart attack in 1987, and said he had surgery to place stents in his coronary artery.
- On December 16, 2010, the final episode of Larry King Live aired on CNN, with Ryan Seacrest and Bill Maher acting as co-masters of ceremonies, and surprise appearances by President Barack Obama, Gov. Arnold Schwarzenegger, former President Bill Clinton, future President Donald Trump, and network news anchors Barbara Walters, Diane Sawyer, Katie Couric and Brian Williams, among others. King says his final show was not a "good-bye" but rather a "so long", as he plans to move on and pursue other things. The final show attracted an audience of 2.24 million people, more than triple the program's usual audience of 672,000.

== Guest hosts ==
When King was absent from the show, other interviewers substituted for him.

- Geraldo Rivera was a guest host in 1985.
- Ryan Seacrest of Wild Animal Games and American Idol sat in as guest host for a few shows.
- Nancy Grace sat in as guest host for a few shows, including that of October 31, 2003, regarding the Scott Peterson case.
- On April 1, 1994 and 2002, Kermit the Frog hosted the show as an April Fool's joke.
- On February 16, 1998, Dan Rather hosted a show regarding the then-ongoing Iraq crisis. He also hosted on October 19, 2000, with Jay Leno as a guest.
- On March 29, 1996, Newt Gingrich, at the time the Speaker of the House, hosted, with Jack Hanna serving as the guest.
- On October 16, 1998, Wolf Blitzer hosted the show, the subject matter being the Matthew Shepard case. He also hosted the episodes of March 1 and March 19, 2008. In addition, he hosted again on March 22, 2010, and in August 2010.
- On May 22, 2000, Kathie Lee Gifford hosted, while Diane Sawyer and Joan Rivers were the guests.
- On November 30, 2000, Roger Cossack interviewed John Ashcroft, who had just been defeated by Mel Carnahan. Carnahan, who died, was replaced by his wife, Jean
- On January 22, 2001, Bob Schieffer hosted a show about campaign finance reform with John McCain as a guest.
- On May 3, 2001, Wheel of Fortune's Pat Sajak hosted.
- On June 8, 2005, sportscaster Bob Costas was named as the regular substitute anchor for the show, filling in roughly 20 times a year and not on a set schedule.
- On August 18, 2005, Chris Pixley hosted the program instead of then-regular guest host Bob Costas, who did not feel comfortable with the subject matter, the Natalee Holloway case.
- On September 12, 2005, Dr. Phil hosted, the subject matter being the aftermath of Hurricane Katrina. He again sat as guest host on February 27, 2009, interviewing various people concerning the Suleman octuplets.
- Comedian Bill Maher has taken up the duties of guest host.
- On June 26, 2006, former CNN, now Fox News Channel reporter John Roberts hosted.
- In March 2007, Mike Shiver sat in as guest host for a couple of shows.
- In April 2007, Star Jones hosted.
- On April 6, 2007, late-night talk show host Jimmy Kimmel hosted.
- On July 24, 2007, former attorney and TMZ.com managing editor Harvey Levin guest-hosted the show, the topic of discussion being Lindsay Lohan's arrest that morning.
- On March 11, 2008, John King hosted; he also did on July 26, 2008, November 21, 2008, and January 28, 2009.
- On March 17, 2008, and April 24, 2009, Dr. Drew hosted.
- On July 21, 2008, Glenn Beck hosted.
- On October 19, 2007, November 14, 2008, April 13, 2009, and May 1, 2009, Joy Behar hosted the show. On the May 1, 2009 show, Larry King was the guest.
- On July 26, 2008, Kathy Griffin hosted for an episode featuring paparazzi.
- On March 9, 2009, Ali Velshi hosted.
- On March 11, 2009, Sanjay Gupta hosted.
- On March 12, 2009, Fox News Channel's Jeanine Pirro hosted.
- On March 27, 2009, Tavis Smiley hosted. He did so again on August 10, 2010.
- On December 31, 2009, Candy Crowley hosted.
- On February 19, 2010, Jeff Probst hosted. He also hosted again on August 6, 2010.
- On June 5, 2010, future US president Donald Trump hosted a 25th anniversary special during which he interviewed King.
- On August 2, 2010, Kyra Phillips hosted.
- On August 3, 2010, Ali Wentworth hosted.
- On August 22, 2010, George Lopez hosted.

=== Planned Al Gore hosting ===
Al Gore was supposed to host on May 6, 1999, with Oprah Winfrey as a guest and the topic was supposed to be the aftermath of the Columbine High School massacre. However, with Gore's candidacy for the presidency pending, CNN decided not to let him host as a result of the controversy.
