= Dmitri Petrov =

Russian-American biologist and academic

- Born: 8 February 1969 (age 57); Moscow, USSR
- Education: Moscow Institute of Physics and Technology (M.A.); Harvard University (PhD)
- Scientific career
- Fields: Biology
- Doctoral advisor: Richard Lewontin, Dan Hartl

Dmitri Alexandrovich Petrov (born 8 February 1969) is a Russian-American biologist.

He was born in Moscow and earned a master's degree in physics and molecular biology in 1989 from the Moscow Institute of Physics and Technology. Petrov obtained a doctorate in biology from Harvard University under the guidance of Richard Lewontin and Dan Hartl, continued at Harvard as a Junior Fellow and a Postdoctoral Fellow in the lab of Ting Wu, and then joined the faculty of Stanford University in 2000. He was appointed to Associate Professor with tenure in 2005, to Professor in 2009, and the Kevin and Michelle Douglas Endowed Professorship in 2011.

Petrov is best known for his work on measurements of mutational biases, quantification of natural selection using genomic data, and experimental and theoretical work on very rapid evolution in large populations of metazoans, viruses, and somatic cells.
