= Charles Goss (disambiguation) =

Charles Goss (1864-1946) was an English librarian.

Charles Goss may also refer to:

- Charles A. Goss (1864–1938), chief justice of the Nebraska Supreme Court
- Dr. Charles Goss, fictional character
- Charles Frederic Goss (1852–1930), American clergyman and author
- Charles Mayo Goss (1899–1981), American anatomist

== See also ==
- Charles Gosse, Australian surgeon
- Charles Gross (disambiguation)
