= Charles Gross (disambiguation) =

Charles Gross (1934–2026) was an American composer.

Charles Gross may also refer to:

- Charles G. Gross (1936–2019), American neuroscientist and psychologist
- Charles P. Gross, United States Army general
- Charles Gross (slave), also known as Charles Ball, author of 1836 slave narrative

== See also ==
- Charles Goss (disambiguation)
