= Louisa Dresser =

American art historian

Louisa Dresser (October 25, 1907 – September 15, 1989), also known as Louisa Dresser Campbell, was an expert on early American painting, and curator at the Worcester Art Museum. She was awarded a Guggenheim Fellowship in 1956 for her studies.

== Early life and education ==
Louisa Dresser was born in Worcester, Massachusetts, the daughter of Frank Farnum Dresser and Josephine Lincoln Dresser. Through her mother's family, she was descended from Levi Lincoln Sr. and Levi Lincoln Jr., governors of Massachusetts. She graduated from Vassar College in 1929. She pursued further studies at the Fogg Art Museum, and the Courtauld Institute in London.

== Career ==
In 1932, Louisa Dresser joined the staff at the Worcester Art Museum, as associate curator of decorative arts. During World War II she was appointed acting director of the museum. In 1949 she became curator of collections, and she continued in that role until her retirement in 1972. During her tenure as curator, Dresser wrote Seventeenth-Century Painting in New England (1935), remembered as "a study marked by careful scholarship that spawned research and exhibitions by other scholars." She was one of the 1956 Guggenheim Fellowship recipients. In 1964 she became the third woman elected to membership in the American Antiquarian Society.

After retirement, Campbell continued editing the museum's catalogs, and served as an honorary trustee. She was one of the founders of the Worcester Center for Crafts, wrote a history of the town's historic Salisbury Mansion, and was otherwise active in the community.

== Personal life ==
Dresser's younger sister, Frances M. Dresser Herron, was also involved with art preservation, as a secretary to the second Roberts Commission after World War II.

Louisa Dresser married Donald W. Campbell in 1971; she was widowed in 1978. She died in 1989, age 81. One of the galleries at the Worcester Art Museum is named in her memory.

An oral history interview with Louisa Dresser, conducted in 1972, is at the Archives of American Art.
