= Frank Rooney (novelist) =

American author

Frank Rooney was an American author. His short story Cyclists' Raid, originally published in Harper's Magazine in 1951, was adapted into the 1953 film The Wild One starting Marlon Brando. His 1954 novel The Courts of Memory was a finalist for the National Book Award.

Cyclists' Raid tells the story of World War II veteran Joel Bleeker who manages a hotel in a small town with his daughter Cathy. Bleeker is pushed to the breaking point when a motorcycle gang converge on the town and terrorize him and the townspeople.

The Courts of Memory tells the story of brother and sister Dick and Brace who have a turbulent relationship growing up. The story follows the two characters from their teenage years into adulthood. Brace, who is idealistic, adventurous, and alienated from the rest of her family, forms a loving bond with her younger brother Dick. In adulthood, the two continue their tumultuous lives but remain close and supportive of one another. Brace has a series of failed marriages, first to a socially conservative, traditionalist banker, and then to a reckless son of a Hollywood producer. Dick develops alcoholism before settling down in a happy marriage. Reviewing the novel in The New York Times, John Brooks stated that Rooney had succeeded in giving the character Brace "unusual individuality and charm to go with her perverse behavior." He also said that the two characters were enjoyable as "vivid, precocious, infuriating and memorable Hollywood children." The Kirkus review stated that the novel never sacrificed its vitality in its intimate examination of the two characters.

Rooney was awarded a Guggenheim Fellowship in 1956 to study fiction.

Rooney was born in Kansas and was raised in Los Angeles, California.
