= Daniel Hartl =

American biologist

- Education: University of Wisconsin–Stevens Point at Wausau; University of Wisconsin–Madison
- Scientific career
- Fields: Evolutionary Biology, Genetics
- Workplaces: University of Minnesota; Purdue University; Washington University in St. Louis; Harvard University

Daniel L. Hartl (born 1943) is the Higgins Professor of Biology in the Department of Organismic and Evolutionary Biology at Harvard University. He is also a principal investigator at the Hartl Laboratory at Harvard University. His research interests are focused on evolutionary genomics, molecular evolution, and population genetics.

== Early life ==
Hartl was born in 1943 and spent his childhood in Antigo, Wisconsin. He has three brothers and grew up with foster children living in his home. Hartl's father worked in a cheese factory and his mother worked nights as a sous chef.

== Education ==
Hartl was not exposed to the study of genetics in high school, and he was not sure he would go to college. His high school teacher, Robert Meyer, encouraged Hartl to apply for a scholarship, which allowed him to attend University of Wisconsin–Marathon County in Wausau, Wisconsin for two years. He had just enough money for tuition, and his brothers bought him a car so he could commute the 35 miles to school. He then transferred to the main campus of the University of Wisconsin–Madison. He remained at the University of Wisconsin, Madison to earn his PhD in genetics. Hartl studied Drosophila (a group of fruit flies) and investigated "the mystery of segregation distortion."

In 1968 he began postdoctoral work at the University of California, Berkeley, where he worked with geneticist Spencer Brown.

== Academic career ==
Beginning in 1969 Hartl had faculty positions at the University of Minnesota College of Liberal Arts, Purdue University, Arts and Sciences at Washington University in St. Louis, and Harvard Faculty of Arts and Sciences. He has been at Harvard since 1993. Hartl is the Higgins Professor of Biology in the Department of Organismic and Evolutionary Biology at Harvard University.

== Research ==
Hartl began his career studying genetics of segregation distortion in Drosophila. He has published work on population genetic theory, tests of selection, evolution of antimicrobial resistance in E. coli and malaria. His lab identified the Mariner transposon. As of 2017 research at the Hartl Laboratory at Harvard University focused on evolutionary genomics, molecular evolution, and population genetics. Hartl's ongoing research includes malaria research, which his connected to his work on antibiotic resistance.

== Author ==
Hartl is the author of a widely used textbook on population genetics and an introductory text on genetics.

== Awards and honors ==
Hartl is the 2019 recipient of the Thomas Hunt Morgan Medal from the Genetics Society of America (GSA). The award recognizes a lifetime of achievement in genetics research.

He was elected President of the Genetics Society of America for 1989. He is an elected fellow of the National Academy of Sciences and the American Academy of Arts and Sciences.

== Published works ==
- Daniel L Hartl, Andrew G Clark, Andrew G Clark. Principles of population genetics, 4th ed. 1997. Sinauer Associates (Sunderland, Massachusetts).
- H Ochman, A S Gerber, D L Hartl. "Genetic applications of an inverse polymerase chain reaction". Genetics. November 1, 1988 vol. 120 no. 3 621–623.
- Hartl, D. L. A primer of population genetics. 1988. Sinauer Associates (Sunderland, Massachusetts). ISBN 9780878933013.
