= Charles Mayo Goss =

American anatomist (1899–1981)

- Born: Charles Mayo Goss; February 16, 1899; Peoria, Illinois
- Died: April 17, 1981 (aged 82); Mobile, Alabama
- Education: Yale University (AB); Yale School of Medicine (MD)
- Years active: 1927–1981
- Known for: Editor of Gray's Anatomy
- Medical career
- Field: Anatomist
- Institutions: Louisiana State University School of Medicine; University of Alabama School of Medicine
- Sub-specialties: Mammalian cardiac embryology

Charles Mayo Goss (February 16, 1899 – March 17, 1981) was an American anatomist, classicist, medical researcher, professor, editor, and educator. He is best known as the editor of five American editions of Gray's Anatomy. Goss was professor and chairman of the Department of Anatomy at the University of Alabama and at Louisiana State University Medical School. He published approximately 130 papers during his lifetime and specialized in the area of mammalian cardiac embryology.

== Early life and education ==
Goss was born in Peoria, Illinois, to a father who was a grocer and a mother who came from a family of farmers. He attended Franklin School, later enrolling at Bradley Polytechnic Institute, where he received a classical education, learning Latin, Greek, German, and French. He then set off to Yale University, where he received an AB (1921) and then Yale School of Medicine, where he earned an MD (1926).

== Medical career ==
Goss began a career in academia, first teaching anatomy at Yale for several years (1926–1929), then at the College of Physicians and Surgeons at Columbia University (1929–1938), the University of Alabama (1938–1947), Louisiana State University Medical School (1947–1965), George Washington University Medical School (1966–1975), and the University of South Alabama at Mobile (1975–1981). His background as a classical scholar led him to publish new translations of Galen, bringing about a new understanding of the ancient Greek anatomist. He also was active with the American Association of Anatomists and was the editor of The Anatomical Record.

== Posthumous dispute ==
Decades after his death, Goss received renewed attention for his revisions of the 25th edition of Gray's Anatomy in 1948, in which he was said to have removed an illustration of the clitoris, (Note: In her review of the literature published between 1859 and 1981, medical historian Sarah B. Rodriguez found numerous instances neglecting the clitoris in anatomy and gynecology texts and many examples of sexism. The clitoris was not adequately studied until the work of Helen O'Connell was published between 1998 and 2010. O'Connell was motivated to begin this research based on her medical training in the 1980s, which relied on textbooks that omitted descriptions of the clitoris.) a diagram of which first appeared in the 12th edition (1901). Various scholars have come up with competing explanations for the revisions. Academic anatomist and medical educator Joel A. Vilensky debunked these claims in his journal article "Clitoral Anatomy in the Feminist Literature" (2022). Vilensky argues that the entire idea that anatomists attempted to remove or downplay the clitoris from the medical literature is based on bias and misunderstanding. (Note: Vilensky: "In [Moore and Clarke's] opinion, the most striking evidence they have for their hypothesis is the absence of a label for the clitoris in the 1948 edition of Gray's Anatomy whereas a label was present in the 1901 edition. Thus, they conclude that the clitoral label on the mid-sagittal section from the 1901 edition had been 'actively deleted' in the 1948 edition. Unfortunately, Moore and Clarke failed to appreciate that the two drawings were clearly not based on the same cadaver. Accordingly, there are many other labeling differences between the two figures. In addition, the figure in the 1948 edition was associated with the section of the book on the uterus, not on the female external genitalia. Had the authors simply turned a few more pages they would have seen the Gray's image in the 1948 edition that is associated with the female perineum in which the clitoris is well seen and labeled. Furthermore, if one actually looks at the image from 1901 Figure 4, Table 1 the clitoris appears to be simply represented by a fold in the perineal skin/fat; no anatomical detail is shown in the image so it is quite disingenuous for the authors to consider this image as showing the clitoris.") Vilensky traces the origin of the claim to a 1995 article by Lisa Jean Moore and Adele E. Clarke in the journal Feminist Studies.

== See also ==
- List of Guggenheim Fellowships awarded in 1956

== Selected work ==
=== Gray's Anatomy ===
- Gray, Henry (1948) [1858]. Goss, Charles Mayo (ed.). Anatomy of the Human Body (25th ed.). Lea and Febiger. OCLC 528775.
- Gray, Henry (1954) [1858]. Goss, Charles Mayo (ed.). Anatomy of the Human Body (26th ed.). Lea & Febiger. OCLC 2015826.
- Gray, Henry (1959) [1858]. Goss, Charles Mayo (ed.). Anatomy of the Human Body (27th ed.). Lea & Febiger. OCLC 561141.
- Gray, Henry (1966) [1858]. Goss, Charles Mayo (ed.). Anatomy of the Human Body (28th ed.). Lea & Febiger. OCLC 244448.
- Gray, Henry (1973) [1858]. Goss, Charles Mayo (ed.). Anatomy of the Human Body (29th ed.). Lea & Febiger. ISBN 9780812103779. OCLC 593593.

=== Other work ===
- Goss, Charles Mayo (1959). A Brief Account of Henry Gray, F.R.S. and His Anatomy, Descriptive and Surgical, During a Century of Its Publication in America. Lea & Febiger. hdl:2027/mdp.39015065937974. OCLC 1485337838.
