= Geology of Austria =

The geology of Austria consists of Precambrian rocks and minerals together with younger marine sedimentary rocks uplifted by the Alpine orogeny.

== Geologic history ==
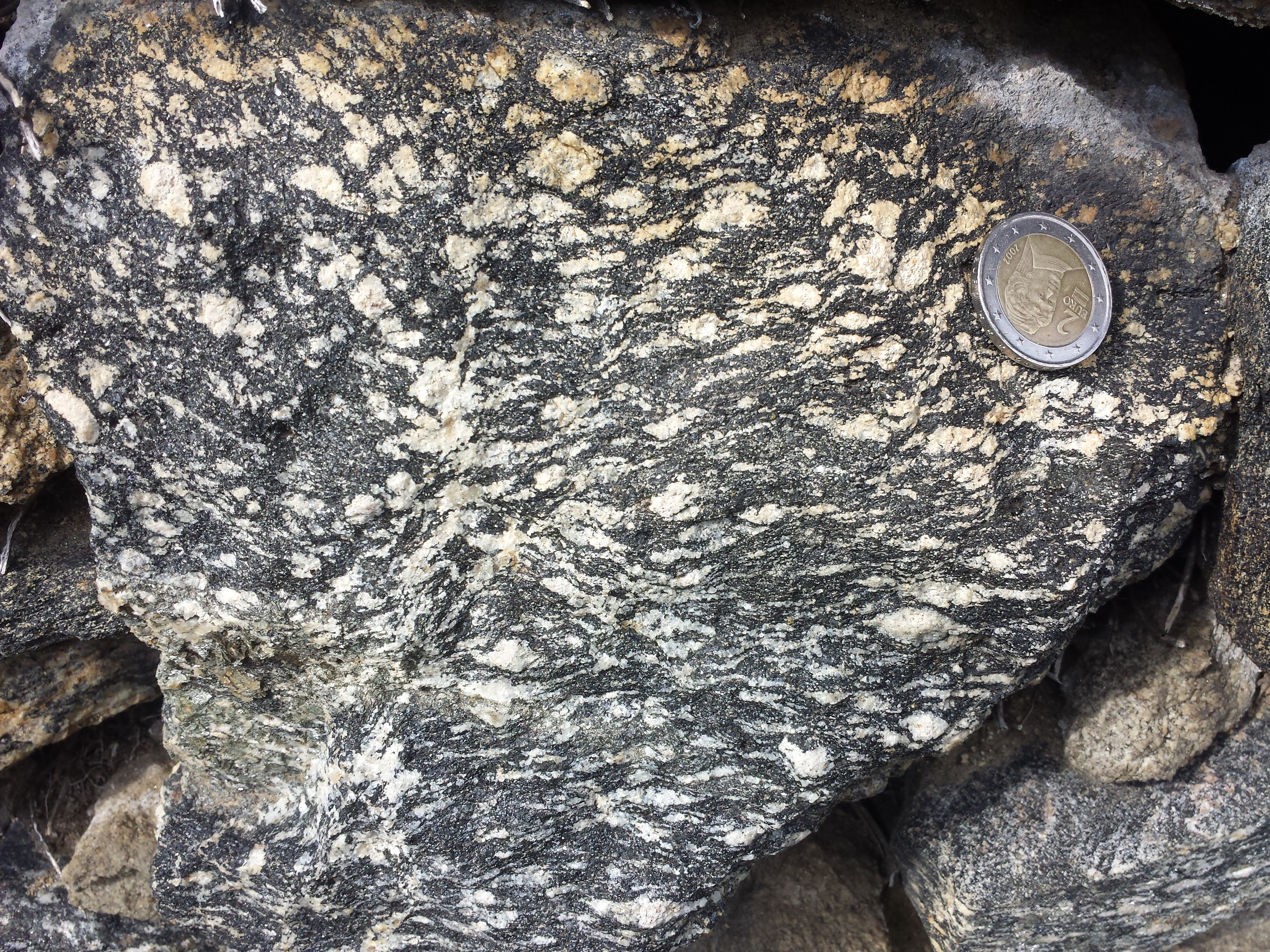
Precambrian granodioritic gneiss (about 614±10 million years old) of the Bohemian Massif at Spitz, northeast Austria

Most of the rocks in Austrian territory formed in the last 540 million years, during the Phanerozoic explosion of life. Small zircon crystals, eroded out of three billion year old granites are among the few remnants of the Precambrian. Dobra Gneiss, at 1.38 billion years old, is the oldest rock in Austria within the Moldanubian Superunit in the Waldviertel region. Mica schist and phyllite were deposited between 900 and 500 million years ago.

=== Cambrian ===
In the Cadomian Event, fragments of continental crust such as the Bohemian Massif and the Alps joined the margin of the supercontinent Gondwana. Igneous activity occurred, in connection with small ocean basins opening. The Maissau granite, dated to 570 million years ago, in the eastern edge of the Bohemian Massif is a remnant of this igneous activity. The Austrian crustal components of Gondwana drifted into the southern hemisphere in the early Cambrian. At the end of the Cambrian, some crustal fragments separated again as microcontinents with the opening of the Rheic Ocean. The Moravian Superunit is one example of this pattern.

=== Ordovician ===
Situated near the South Pole at the start of the Ordovician, the region was likely barren and nearly lifeless. The Austroalpine and South Alpine superunits formed a shelf that received clay and sand sediments from the continental interior. The Ordovician also marked a poorly understood period of igneous activity, that resulted in granites and the Blasseneck Porphyroid, a weakly metamorphosed porphyry in the Greywacke Zone, with mixed layers of pyroclastic flow and lava.

Some of the earliest fossils were deposited at the end of the Ordovician on the continental shelf, including orthocerids and cystoids.

=== Silurian-Devonian ===
In the Silurian, crustal extension began, opening the Paleotethys Ocean on the northern margin of Gondwana. Basins filled with sand, clay and calcareous sediments while basalt and andesite poured out of cracks, ultimately metamorphosing into amphibolite and greenschist now found in the Austroalpine and South Alpine superunits.

Gondwana drifted northward in the Devonian and large reefs developed on the continental shelf of Austria. Island arc collisions are recorded as amphibolite and gneiss in the Sub-Pennic Superunit of the Hohe Tauern mountain range.

With the closing of the Rheic Ocean and the western Paleotethyic Ocean, the supercontinent Pangaea took shape. Extensive erosion of mountain ranges and basin formations led to coal deposition. These coal deposits were subsequently mined in the Brenner area of Tyrol and Stangalpe in the Nockberge mountain range in Carinthia.

=== Variscan Orogeny: Carboniferous, Permian and Triassic ===
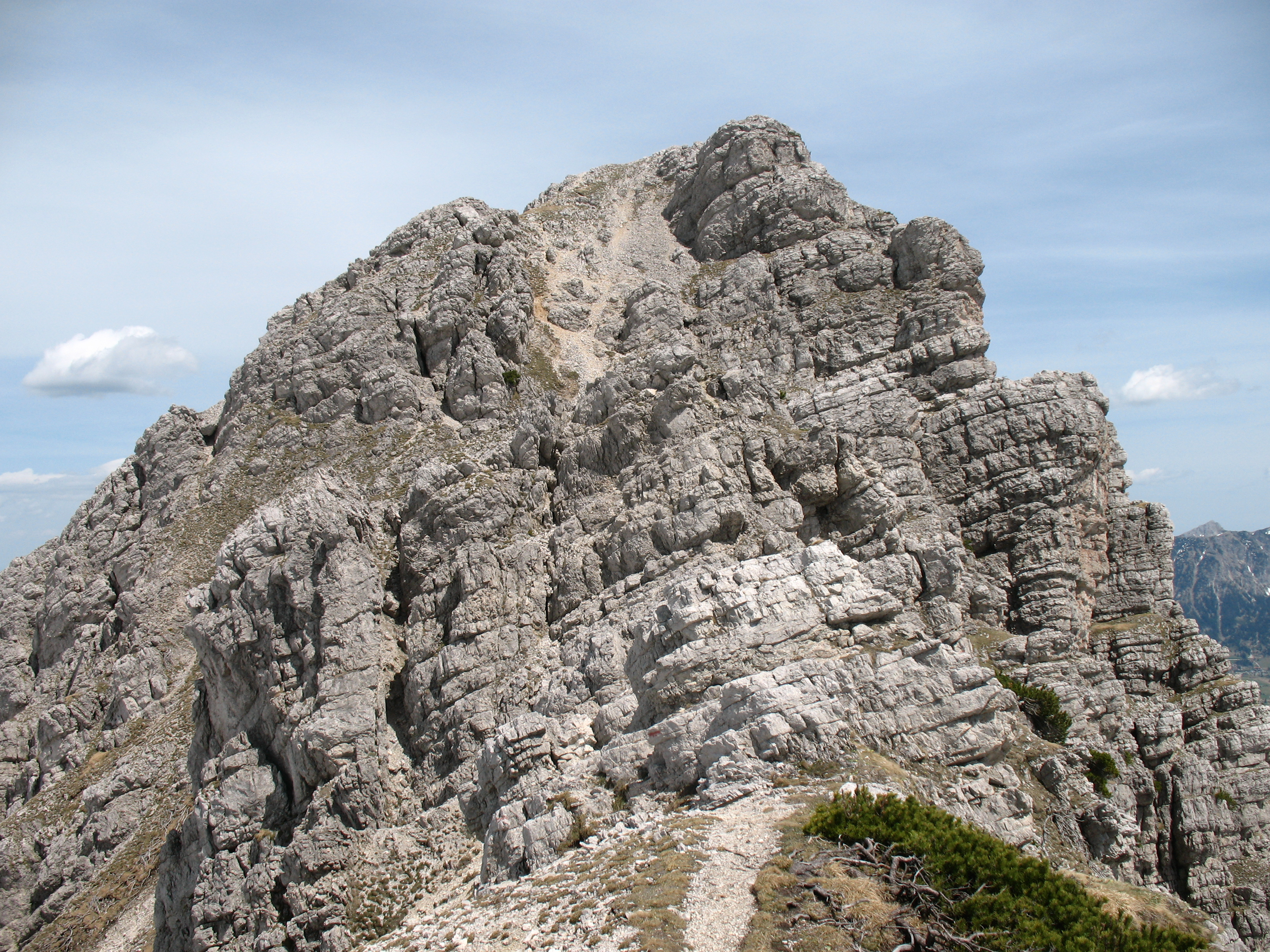
Tilted layers of the Main Dolomite, of Triassic age, at the summit of Rohnenspitze

A major mountain range formed with the closing of the oceans, spanning thousands of kilometers across Pangaea. Known as the Variscan orogeny in Central Europe, the mountain building event left remnant highlands throughout Europe, northwestern Africa and North America. The Alps and the Bohemian Massif were affected by the orogeny. The Sub-Penninic and Moldanubian superunits were deeply buried within the new range (granulites in the Moldanubian Superunit, for instance, formed at 55 kilometers depth), while the Austroalpine superunit likely formed foothills. A tropical climate dominated the region, supporting 40 meter trees.

Melting occurred, forming granites now found in all the major Austrian superunits. Crustal extension began again in the Permian leading to more basalt melts, granite and pegmatite formation, which are commonly found in the South Alpine and Austroalpine Superunits. Explosive quartz-dominated volcanism took place at the surface, creating the Bozen Quartz Porphyry, which is hundreds of meters thick in South Tyrol. Crustral extension combined with erosion to reduce the height of the Variscan mountains to only a few hundred meters above sea level. Embayments of the Tethys Ocean flooded the edge of the South Alpine and Austroalpine superunits, leaving fossil-rich limestones as well as salt and gypsum deposits. The region experienced a dry climate akin to modern-day Arabia, before the Permian-Triassic mass extinction.

Amidst the slower tectonic activity of the Triassic, continental sediments formed dark limestones in a poorly ventilated offshore marine environment. The ocean expanded inland, creating a large shelf environment and improved water circulation from the Tethys Ocean generated a large reef belt. Volcanic activity picked up 230 million years ago forming the South Tyrolean Dolomites and depositing ash fall on the Northern Calcareous Alps. Sandstone, gypsum and mudstone formed in near shore areas of the Sub-Pennic and Helvetic superunits. At a few spots, such as Lunz am See sand and claystones interbedded with coal.

The famous Halstatt Limestone, well known for ammonite fossils, was deposited in warm shallow water less than 100 meters deep. The Meliatic Superunit, on the other hand, preserves deep sea siliceous material formed 4000 meters below the surface of the Tethys Ocean.

=== Breakup of Pangaea: Jurassic-Cretaceous ===
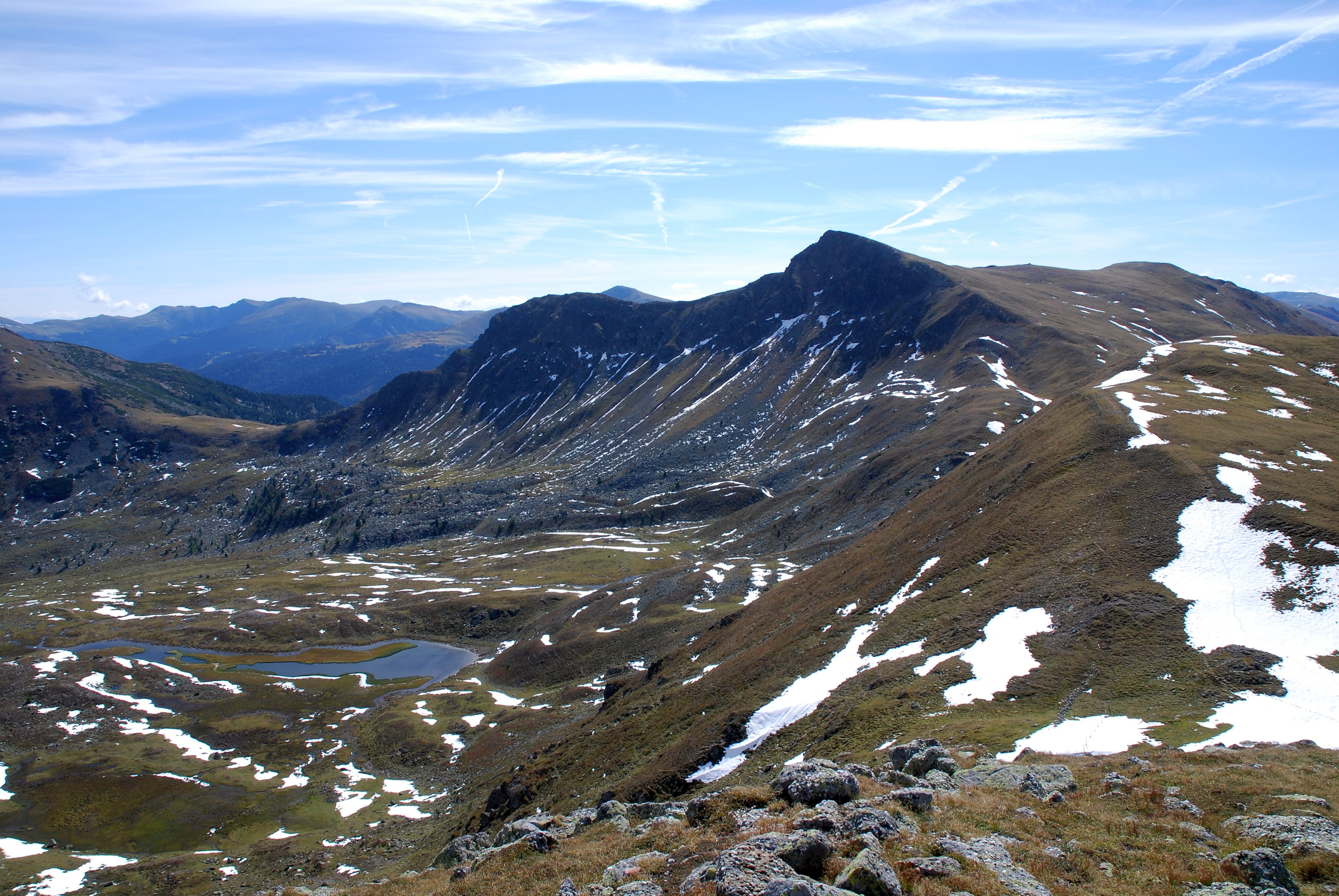
Königstuhl in the Guktal Alps

Rifts began to form within Pangaea opening the Atlantic Ocean. At first, the rifts filled with continental sediments. The Tarntal Breccia in the Austroalpine Superunit preserves tectonic rock fracturing. A fault opened to the west, forming the Penninic Ocean. Deep plumes of mantle rock reached the surface, interacting with seawater to become serpentinite.

Central Europe formed the northwestern margin of the Penninic Ocean. Permian and Triassic sediments emerged above sea level on the Moldanubian, Moravian, Helvetic and Sub-Penninc superunits. As the Tethys Ocean crust began to subduct, only small fragments of its crust remained in the Meliatic Superunit in the Eastern Alps. The Tethys Ocean closed in the Dinarides and Hellenides in the late Cretaceous. The formation of the Alps started 135 million years ago at a strike-slip fault between the Penninic and Tethys Ocean. The Northern Calcareous Alps and Gurktal Alps formed as an orogenic wedge as sedimentary rocks were torn off basement rock that was subducted back into the mantle. The crust of the Penninic Ocean subducted around 85 million years ago. Deep water sediments accumulated due to earthquake related submarine landslides. Some rock units were dragged underneath the Radstadter Tauern and Semmering mountains.

=== Cenozoic: Paleogene-Neogene ===
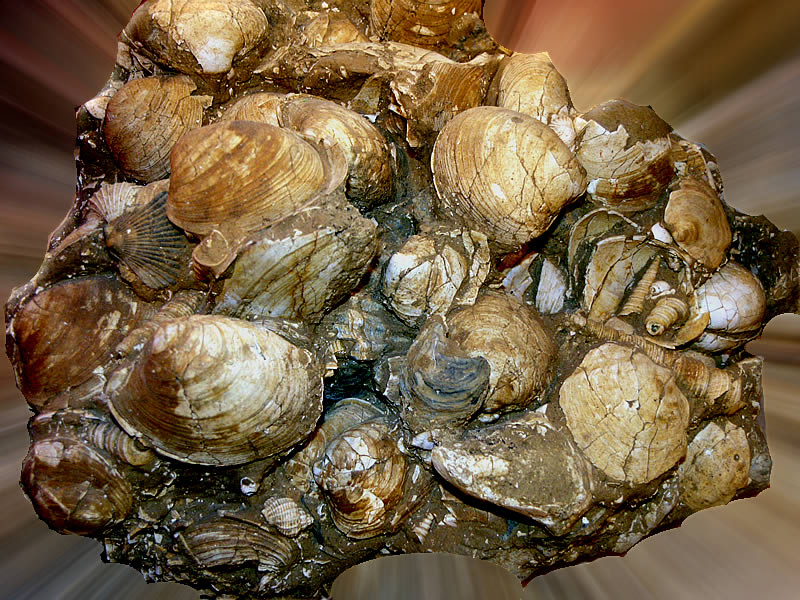
Fossilized shells of bivalves and gastropods, which lived in the sea during the Miocene, from Gainfarn, Lower Austria

The Penninic Ocean fully closed and subducted 50 million years ago, although sections of orogenic rock were thrust onto the Helvetic Shelf. Nappes in the South Alpine Superunit formed as the unstable Adriatic Plate shifted northward into the Helvetic Shelf. The building of the Alps continued, as some units subsided 60 kilometers below the surface, metamorphosing under high pressure. Eclogite and blueschist in the Sub-Penninic Superunit and Penninic Superunit are seen as evidence of the extent of metamorphism.

Igneous activity formed tonalite, granite and basalt between five and 25 kilometers depth, while volcanoes were active on the surface. Volcanic clasts in the Molasse Zone of Upper Bavaria and Salzburg evidence the presence of the volcanoes, which subsequently eroded. The eastern part of the Northern Calcareous Alps was part of an alluvial river plain, which explains the crystalline pebbles now located on high plateaus.

The area by the edge of the Alps was pushed down by the weight of the orogenic wedge, forming a foreland basin, which flooded around 34 million years—becoming the inland Molasse Sea from France to Central Asia. Also known as the Paratethys, the new sea hosted rich fauna, including whales, sharks, manatees, mussels, seaweed and bladder wrack, and formed the Schoeneck Fish Shale, an important petroleum source rock. The basin silted up 17 million years ago and shifted to freshwater deposition, which were then worn away seven million years ago.

Beginning 23 million years ago, the Adriatic Plate continued to approach the Eurasian Plate, resulting in crustal shortening and extended the orogenic eastward, creating the Styrian, Carpathian, Pannonian and Vienna basins. The greatest shortening and compression is found in the vicinity of the Hohe Tauern mountains, forming large crystals and epidote in rock cracks. Water and ice eroded tectonically fractured rocks beginning 17 million years ago, creating deep Alpine valleys.

Along strike-slip faults, the Koralpe and Saualpe mountain ranges were uplifted and tilted to the east. Elsewhere, intramontane basins such as Fohnsdorf, Tamsweg and Lavantall formed, accumulating mountain debris and coal. The Molasse Sea-Paratethys Ocean extended into the Vienna, Styrian and Pannonian basins, which became isolated as the Pannonian Lake 12 million years ago.

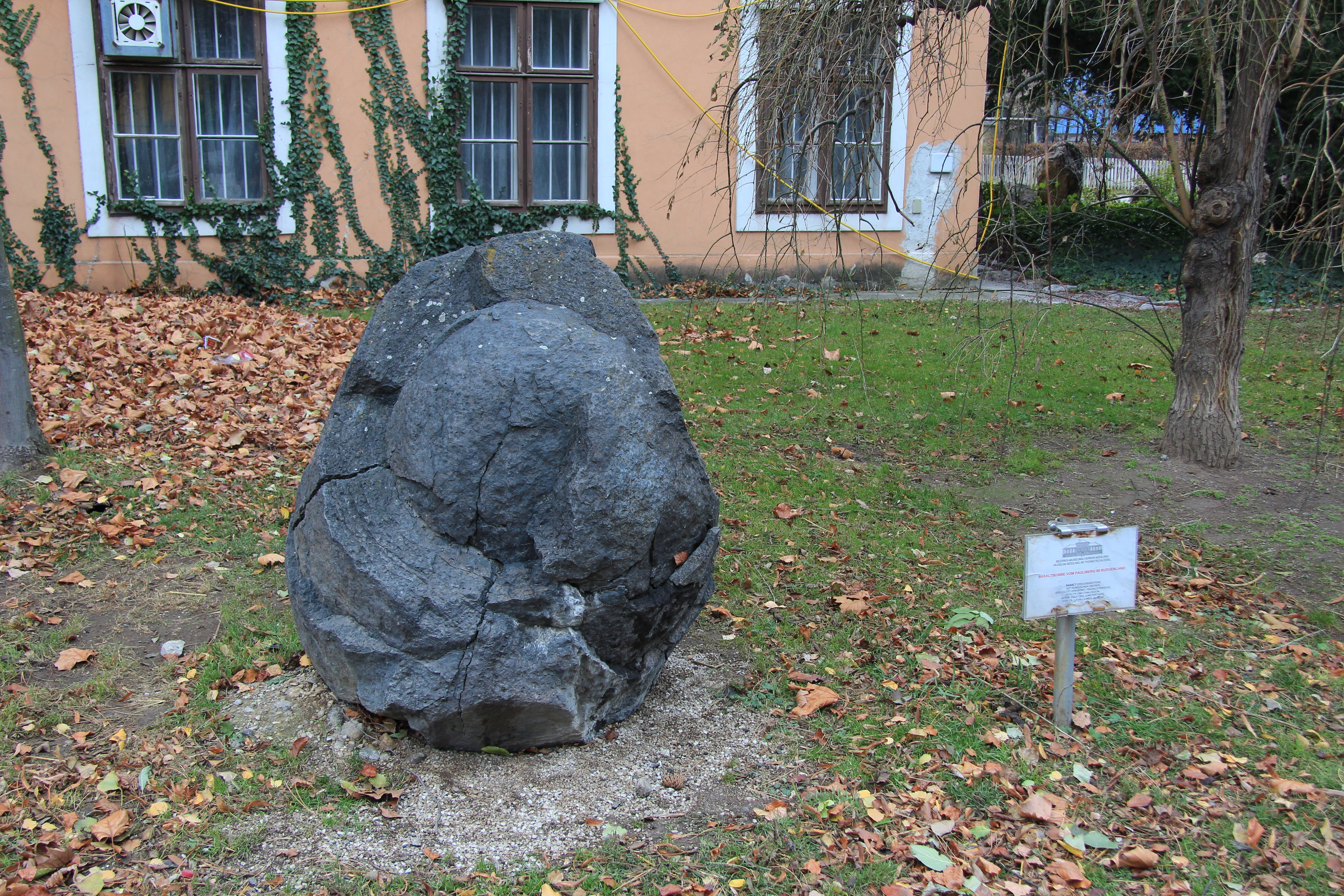
Volcanic bomb erupted from Pauliberg volcano

Volcanoes were active until 15 million years ago, as a result of volatiles subducted with the Penninic Ocean crust melting rock, found in Bad Gleichenberg and Weitendorf, villages both in Styria. Basalts erupted at Mount Pauliberg, approximately 11 million years ago and small basalt flows erupted into the early Quaternary.

=== Quaternary ===
Quaternary glaciation began in the Alps 870,000 years ago and advanced to the Alpine Foreland 650,000 years ago. In the Alps, the four glaciations are known by the names of Bavarian rivers: Gunz, Mindel, Riss and Wurm. The Wurm glaciation is the most recent and best preserved, ending 11,700 years ago. Sedimentary terraces up to 300 meters thick formed rapidly in the Inn Valley due to glaciation. The Vienna basin filled with loose material created by frost shatter and moved by partial melting of permafrost and high winds. Although a warming period 20,000 years ago rapidly melted the glaciers, they advanced again 16,000 and 12,000 years ago.

== Structural and tectonic geology ==
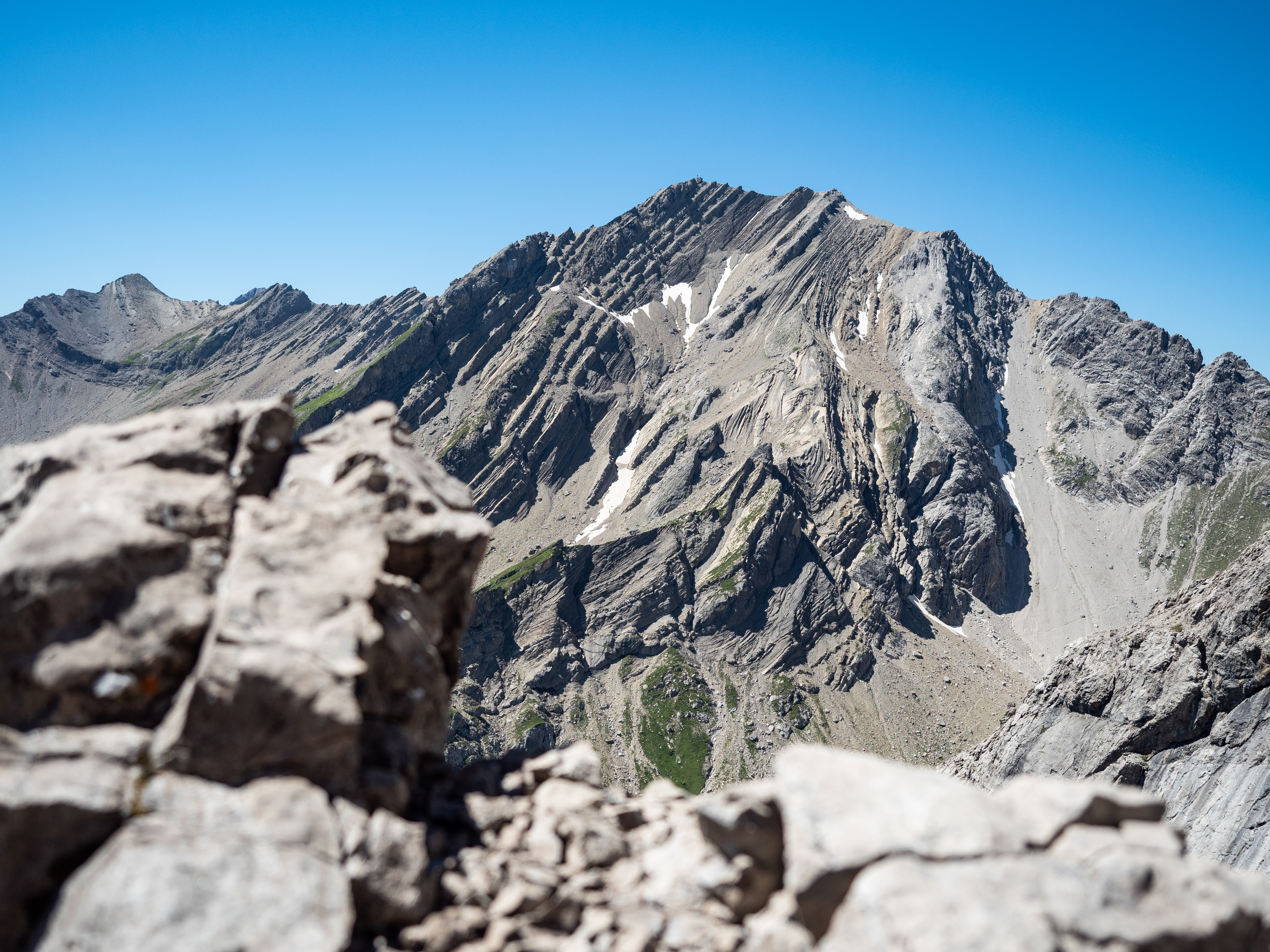
Folded strata in the Northern Calcareous Alps – Rotkopf and Imster Muttekopf in the Lechtal Alps, Tyrol

The Salzach-Enns-Mariazell-Puchberg Fault (SEMP) is the largest in the Northern Calcareous Alps. The Pols, Lavant, Mur, Murz, Isel and Moll valleys are all examples of strike-slip faults. The Periadriatic Fault, in the Gail Valley into the Karawanken mountains creates the border between the Eastern and Southern Alps. Nappes in the Penninic and Sub-Penninic superunits are exposed through normal faults such as the Lower Engadine Window, Tauern Window and Rechnitz Window.

== Natural resource geology ==
Copper ores have been mined from the Austrian Graywacke Zone since prehistoric times. Salt mining in the Northern Calcareous Alps began in the Salzkammergut (Hallstatt) in Late Permian deposits in the Bronze Age, along with iron deposits.

By the early 1990s, mining had largely ceased in Austria except for 980,000 tons of sparry magnesite extracted in 1991 and some mining of siderite, lead-zinc sulfides and antimonite. At the time, small occurrences of kaolinite, talc, graphite, mica, rock salt, gypsum and anhydrite were also mined.

In 1930, Neogene hydrocarbon extraction began in the Vienna Basin, with subsequent discoveries in the Molasse Zone of Upper Austria—by 1991, 1.3 billion cubic meters of gas and 1.16 metric tons of oil were produced. The Styrian Basin holds low-grade lignite coal. Due to its underlying karst landscape, Austria typically has high quality groundwater.

== History of geologic research ==
Geologic research began in the 18th century, spurred on by the work of individual naturalists. "Mineralogical and botanical pleasure trip from Mount Terglou in Krain, to Mount Glokner in Tyrol in the year 1779 and 1781" published in 1783, is recognized as the first book on Austrian geology. In 1835, a Museum of Mining was established in Vienna, through the Imperial and Royal Geological Office. Ritter von Haidinger founded the bureau, which launched a systematic survey of Austro-Hungary in 1849. Edward Suess became Austria's first professor of geology and paleontology in the 1850s. In the second half of the 19th century, new geology departments were established at University of Graz and University of Innsbruck. Climbers from the Austrian Alpine Club recognized ammonite fossils, gaining a greater understanding of Alpine geology.
