= Clara M. Szego =

American endocrinologist (1916–2017)

- Born: March 23, 1916; Budapest, Austria-Hungary
- Died: December 6, 2017 (aged 101)
- Occupation: Endocrinologist
- Spouse: Sidney Roberts (died 2016)
- Awards: Guggenheim Fellowship (1956)

Academic background
- Education: Hunter College; University of Minnesota
- Thesis: Studies on Methods of Chemical Assay of Estrogenic Substances and the Physiological Problem of Steroid Metabolism (1942)
- Doctoral advisor: George O. Burr

Academic work
- Discipline: Endocrinology
- Institutions: Yale University School of Medicine; UCLA School of Medicine

Clara Marian Szego (March 23, 1916 – December 6, 2017) was an American endocrinologist. A 1956 Guggenheim Fellow, she specialized in steroid hormones and in estrogen in gynecologic tissue. She was also a professor at University of California, Los Angeles, where she was the founding chair of their Department of Physiological Chemistry.

== Biography ==
=== Early life and career ===
Clara Marian Szego was born on March 23, 1916, in Budapest. She and her parents (who worked as teachers back in Hungary) emigrated to the United States in the early-1920s, and she lived in Gravesend, Brooklyn, during her youth. While in eighth grade, she won third place at the 1929 Chamber of Commerce of the State of New York essay contest.

Szego attended Hunter College, where she was part of Phi Beta Kappa and obtained a BA in 1937. She later moved to the University of Minnesota, where she was part of Leo T. Samuels' laboratory and obtained her MS in 1939 and PhD in 1942. Her doctoral dissertation Studies on Methods of Chemical Assay of Estrogenic Substances and the Physiological Problem of Steroid Metabolism was supervised by George O. Burr. After holding several research positions at the Minnesota Medical Foundation and National Bureau of Standards, she was a postdoctoral fellow at Worcester Foundation for Experimental Biology from 1946 to 1947, working under Gregory G. Pincus.

=== Academic career ===
From 1947 to 1948, Szego worked as a physiological chemistry instructor at Yale University School of Medicine, where her mentor was Abraham White. In 1948, she joined the University of California, Los Angeles as the first chair of the Department of Physiological Chemistry. Originally a research associate, she was promoted to associate professor in 1949 and associate professor in 1955. She eventually became a full professor, retiring as professor emeritus, closing her UCLA lab in 1985. She also chaired the Endocrine Society Awards Committee.

Szego's scientific work specialized in steroid hormones and in estrogen in gynecologic tissue, with her lab making several discoveries in the field. Her work often intersected with oncology, particularly in relation to the causes of breast cancer and gynaeological cancer. However, her work on membrane estrogen receptors did not receive as much attention in the academic sphere as that on hormone-induced gene transcription. She developed screening tests for at-risk individuals for in utero exposure from diethylstilbestrol, having successfully advocated to ban that chemical's use as a feed additive.

Szego and her husband won the 1953 Ciba Foundation Award. In 1956, she was awarded a Guggenheim Fellowship for "studies of the primary mechanisms of steroid hormone action". She gave the 1974 Pincus Memorial Lecture. She also received a Los Angeles Woman of the Year Citation. Richard J. Pietras called her "one of the leading pioneers of steroid hormone actions in health and disease", noting "her impact on the fields of endocrinology and steroid hormone action was profound, and the full ramifications and clinical benefits of her work remain to be realized in cardiovascular, neurological, metabolic-endocrine and oncologic diseases".

=== Personal life and death ===
Szego was married to Sidney Roberts, a fellow graduate student at UMinn, until his death in 2016. She advocated for the inclusion of women in science, including nationally. Following her retirement, she wrote volumes of poetry under the pen name Marian Steele, with one poem published in JAMA.

Szego died on December 6, 2017, aged 101. She and her husband bequeathed $10.5 million to UCLA for scholarships, as well as a $1.5 million chair in molecular and cellular endocrinology at the medical school.
