= Ruth Lawson =

American political scientist

Ruth Catherine Lawson
- Born: 1911; Batavia, New York
- Died: December 14, 1990 (aged 78–79)
- Education: Mount Holyoke College; Bryn Mawr College
- Awards: Guggenheim Fellowship
- Scientific career
- Fields: Political science
- Workplaces: Tulane University; Mount Holyoke College

Ruth Catherine Lawson (1911–December 14, 1990) was an American political scientist. Lawson specialized in international law and European affairs. She was a professor of political science at Mount Holyoke College from 1942 to 1976. She was awarded a Guggenheim Fellowship in 1956, and is the namesake for the Ruth C. Lawson Chair in International Politics and the Ruth C. Lawson Fellowships at Mount Holyoke.

== Education and positions ==
Lawson was born in 1911 in Batavia, New York, where she attended Batavia High School. In 1929 she matriculated at Mount Holyoke College, where she graduated in 1933 with a degree in history and political science, having written an undergraduate thesis called The Political Developments of Iraq: 1914–1932. She then attended Bryn Mawr College, studying international law with Charles G. Fenwick, and completing an M.A. degree in 1934. She took a position as an instructor at the H. Sophie Newcomb Memorial College of Tulane University, remaining there for six years, and in 1942 she moved to Mount Holyoke. Lawson was a professor at Mount Holyoke from 1942 until 1976. She completed a PhD at Bryn Mawr College in 1947.

== Academic work ==
Lawson's research focused on international relations, international law, and European affairs in particular. In 1956, Lawson was awarded the Guggenheim Fellowship from the John Simon Guggenheim Memorial Foundation for political science research. In 1962, she published the book International regional organizations: Constitutional foundations, which was an edited collection of the constitutional documents of those regional associations of countries which proliferated after World War II. In addition to her research, Lawson was particularly involved in organizational activity, including founding and running a United Nations Institute at Mount Holyoke, and creating and managing a Washington internship program for Mount Holyoke Students. In 1989, Mount Holyoke College endowed the Ruth C. Lawson Chair in International Politics. Lawson is also the namesake of the Ruth C. Lawson Fellowships in International Relations, which are awarded by Mount Holyoke every year.

Lawson retired from Mount Holyoke in 1976. She died on December 14, 1990.

== Selected works ==
- "The Problem of the Compulsory Jurisdiction of the World Court", American Journal of International Law (1952)
- International regional organizations: Constitutional foundations (1962)

== Selected awards ==
- Guggenheim Fellowship (1956)
