= Margaret W. Pepperdene =

American academic (1919-2009)

- Born: Margaret Jane Williams; December 25, 1919; Vicksburg, Mississippi, U.S.
- Died: November 20, 2009 (aged 89); Decatur, Georgia, U.S.
- Occupation: English literature academic
- Spouse: John H. Pepperdene (m. 1941; div. 1948)
- Awards: Guggenheim Fellowship (1962)

Academic background
- Education: Louisiana State University; University of Oregon; Vanderbilt University
- Thesis: Irish Christianity and Beowulf: basis for a new interpretation of the Christian elements (1953)

Academic work
- Institutions: Miami University; Agnes Scott College

Margaret Jane Williams Pepperdene (née Williams; December 25, 1919 – November 20, 2009) was an American academic of English literature. A 1962 Guggenheim Fellow, she was the inaugural Ellen Douglass Leyburn Professor of English at Agnes Scott College and later taught English at The Paideia School.

== Biography ==
Pepperdene was born on December 25, 1919 in Vicksburg, Mississippi. She was the only child of Jane (née Stocks) and Le Blanc Williams. After spending a year at the Gulf Park College for Women (1937-1948), she obtained her Bachelor of Science degree from Louisiana State University in 1941. On June 6, 1941, she married John H. Pepperdene, an Illinois Central Railroad worker; they remained married until their divorce in 1948. She was part of the WAVES during World War II.

From 1946 to 1947, Pepperdene worked at the University of Oregon as an English instructor while also taking summer classes. In addition to a year as a Fulbright Fellow at Queen's University Belfast (1950-1951), she did graduate studies at Vanderbilt University, where she worked as a teaching fellow (1948-1950) and assistant instructor (1951-1952) and obtained her Master of Arts and Doctor of Philosophy degrees in 1948 and 1953, respectively. Her doctoral dissertation was titled Irish Christianity and Beowulf: basis for a new interpretation of the Christian elements. She was an American Association of University Women Martha Catching Enochs Fellow at the Dublin Institute for Advanced Studies (1954-1955).

After working as an instructor (1952-1954) and assistant professor (1954-1956) at Miami University, Pepperdene moved to Agnes Scott College as an assistant professor of English in 1956. She was the inaugural Ellen Douglass Leyburn Professor of English, being promoted to the position in the late 1960s. She was also chair of the English department, as well as the Writers' Festival director. Following her 1985 retirement from Agnes Scott, The Paideia School hired her to teach English to upper-class students, and she spent 22 years there until her retirement in 2008.

In 1956, Pepperdene was awarded a Guggenheim Fellowship to research Christianity in Beowulf. She was editor of That Subtile Wreath, a 1974 volume of lectures for John Donne's 400th birthday as part of Agnes Scott's James Ross McCain Lecture Series. She won the 1987 Georgia Humanities Council Governor's Award. In 2006, Agnes Scott awarded her an honorary doctor of humane letters.

Pepperdene was reportedly close to alumni from Agnes Scott and Paideia even after they graduated, as well as poets James Dickey, Robert Frost, and Eudora Welty. Her hobbies included crossword puzzles from The New York Times, raising pedigreed poodles, and watching football games and films.

Pepperdene died from lung cancer on November 20, 2009 at her home in Decatur, Georgia. She was 89.
