= Linda Van Norden =

American literary scholar

- Born: October 26, 1905; Sacramento, California, U.S.
- Died: June 26, 1972 (aged 66); Davis, California, U.S.
- Occupation: Literary scholar
- Awards: Guggenheim Fellowship (1956)

Academic background
- Education: Stanford University; University of Bordeaux; University of Paris; University of California, Los Angeles
- Thesis: The Elizabethan college of antiques (1946)

Academic work
- Discipline: Renaissance studies
- Institutions: College of Puget Sound; University of California, Davis

Linda Van Norden (October 26, 1905 – June 26, 1972) was an American literary scholar. She worked as a professor at the College of Puget Sound and the University of California, Davis, remaining at the latter until her death. A 1956 Guggenheim Fellow, her book The Black Feet of the Peacock was posthumously published in 1985.

== Biography ==
Van Norden was born on October 26, 1905 in Sacramento. She was the daughter of Ruth Spilman and Charles Van Norden, the latter of whom was an author, Congregationalist minister, and president of Elmira College. She attended Stanford University, where she got her bachelor degree in 1924 and master degree in 1927; the University of Bordeaux, where she got a certificate in 1925; and University of Paris.

Van Norden obtained her PhD from University of California, Los Angeles in 1946; her doctoral dissertation was titled The Elizabethan college of antiques. She was an assistant professor at the College of Puget Sound from 1930 to 1946, when she moved to the University of California, Davis. She was promoted from assistant professor to associate professor in 1952.

A scholar of Renaissance studies, Van Norden studied alchemy, iconography, and literature with the field. In 1956, she was awarded a Guggenheim Fellowship to study English late-Renaissance literature. She was working on her book The Black Feet of the Peacock – focusing on the color black in Renaissance literature – at the time of her death. It was finally published in 1985, compiled and edited by John Pollock. She was a co-founder and a president of the Northern California Renaissance Conference, and her Biblical literary studies courses in the field were popular among UC Davis students.

Van Norden died on June 26, 1972. Her body was found at her home in Davis with several of her papers and books in the same room.
