= Louisiana State University School of Medicine =

Louisiana State University School of Medicine refers to two separate medical schools in Louisiana:

- LSU School of Medicine in New Orleans
- LSU School of Medicine in Shreveport

== See also ==
- Louisiana State University System
