= Spencer Wharton Brown =

American professor and cyto-geneticist

- Born: November 20, 1918; Vermillion, South Dakota, U.S.
- Died: June 10, 1977 (aged 58); Berkeley, California, U.S.
- Education: University of Minnesota; University of California, Davis
- Scientific career
- Fields: Genetics
- Workplaces: UC Berkeley College of Chemistry

Spencer Wharton Brown (28 November 1918 – 10 June 1977) was a professor and cyto-geneticist. He taught and researched at the University of California, Berkeley, from 1945 until his murder on June 10, 1977. Brown was internationally renowned and sometimes referred to as "Mr. Chromosome." He was the president of the International Congress of Genetics. Brown was awarded a Guggenheim Fellowship in 1956 in the field of plant studies. He was the first to identify what is called paternal genome elimination in scale insects.

== Life and work ==
Brown was born in Vermillion, South Dakota. He received his undergraduate degree from the University of Minnesota at the age of 20. He was mentored by Barbara McClintock for three years at the University of Missouri. When McClintock moved to the Carnegie Institute, Brown transferred to the University of California at Davis, where he received his Ph.D. in genetics for his study on Californian blackberries (Rubus spp.) one year later, in 1942.

During the war he worked briefly in a shipyard as a welder and afterwards took an interest in psychotherapy and sought to become a professional and obtained admission to the Stanford and UCSF medical schools but decided not to follow it. He became an assistant professor at the University of Georgia in 1943. In 1945 he moved to Berkeley where he taught genetics. Spencer and Marion S. Cave studied the interaction between pollen and ovule of Lilium together. Spencer conducted cytological and karyological studies on tomatoes, Drosophila and was especially interested in maternal effects. He visited numerous laboratories around the world and in 1956 visited Trinidad to examine the genetics of banana. An association with the entomologist Frederick D. Bennett made him shift his interests to insect evolution and examined male haploidy in insects. He identified the elimination of paternal genomes in male scale insects and noticed variations across several families and examined the evolution of these systems.

== Personal life ==
At the age of 21 Brown married Roberta Schuknecht. After 18 years together the marriage ended in divorce.

=== Death ===
Brown was found dead at age 57 in his duplex apartment after failing to appear at a commencement ceremony. He had been bound and gagged before being shot twice in the back. Three suspects were identified. One, Jeanette Iles, 27, pleaded guilty to participating in the robbery/murder, and was sentenced to a life sentence.

== Awards ==
Brown received the 1956 Guggenheim Fellowship, one of 44 such awards the University of California received that year.
