= Paul Ruggiers =

American literary historian

Paul G. Ruggiers (April 29, 1918 – April 8, 1998) was an American literary historian.

He was the David Ross Boyd Professor (1964), George Lynn Cross Professor (1972), and Distinguished Professor of Humanities (1979) at the University of Oklahoma.
