= Songs My Mother Taught Me (Brando book) =

Autobiography of Marlon Brando

- First edition cover
- Author: Marlon Brando; Robert Lindsey
- Language: English
- Genre: Autobiography
- Publisher: Random House
- Publication date: 1994
- ISBN: 978-0-679-41013-3

Songs My Mother Taught Me an autobiography by Marlon Brando with Robert Lindsey as co-author, published by Random House in 1994.

The book deals with Brando's childhood, his memories of being a struggling actor and of his early relationships with family members and later with other actors, producers, and directors. He talks candidly about his sex life, but he shares relatively few details about his wives or children. Reportedly, the omission of details about his experiences as a husband and father was one of Brando's conditions for agreeing to submit his manuscript to the publisher, who paid the actor over a million dollars for the work. He does, though, recount his encounters with and impressions of such notable figures as Marilyn Monroe, Laurence Olivier, Vivien Leigh, David Niven, Richard Burton, Elizabeth Taylor, John F. Kennedy, John Huston, and many others. He also describes some aspects of his theatre work and films, although those descriptions tend to be succinct, characterised more by anecdotes than step-by-step descriptions of production.

In addition to English editions of the book, printings are available in several other languages, including Persian, a translation done by Iranian actress and director Niki Karimi in 1999.

== Reception ==
=== Controversy ===
The book contains Brando's comment on Jews in Hollywood, which caused considerable controversy:

Hollywood was always a Jewish community; it was started by Jews and to this day is run largely by Jews. But for a long time it was venomously anti-Semitic in a perverse way, especially before the war, when Jewish performers had to disguise their Jewishness if they wanted a job. These actors were frightened, and understandably so. When I was breaking into acting, I constantly heard about agents submitting an actor or actress for a part, taking them to the theater for a reading and afterward hearing the producer say, "Terrific. Thank you very much. We’ll call you."

After the actor was gone, the agent would ask, "Well, Al, what did you think?"

"Great," the producer would say, “He was terrific, but he’s too Jewish."

If you “looked Jewish,” you didn’t get a part and couldn’t make a living. You had to look like Kirk Douglas, Tony Curtis, Paul Muni or Paulette Goddard and change your name. They were Jews, but didn’t “look Jewish” and employed the camouflage of non-Jewish names. Hence Julius Garfinkle became John Garfield, Marion Levy became Paulette Goddard, Emmanuel Goldenberg became Edward G. Robinson and Muni Weisenfreund became Paul Muni.

The response to Brando's comments was exacerbated by an interview he gave in 1996, in which he repeated the suggestion that Hollywood was controlled by Jews.
