= Battle of Bussaco order of battle =

This is the order of battle for the Battle of Bussaco, 27 September 1810.

== French Army of Portugal ==
Commander-in-Chief: Marshal Masséna

Army total: 65,050 (49,809 infantry, 8,419 cavalry, 144 guns)

=== II Corps ===
GD Jean Reynier

Division	Brigade	Regiments and Others
1st Division GD Pierre Hugues Victoire Merle (6,589 total)	1st Brigade GB Jacques Thomas Sarrut	2e Légère (4 bns); 36e Ligne (4 bns)
1st Division GD Pierre Hugues Victoire Merle (6,589 total)	2nd Brigade GB Jean François Graindorge	4e Légère (3 or 4 bns)
2nd Division GD Étienne Heudelet de Bierre (8,087 total)	1st Brigade GB Maximilien Sébastien Foy	17e Légère (3 bns); 70e Ligne (4 bns)
2nd Division GD Étienne Heudelet de Bierre (8,087 total)	2nd Brigade GB Arnaud	31e Légère (4 bns); 47e Ligne (3 or 4 bns)
	Cavalry Brigade GB Pierre Benoît Soult (1,397 total)	1e Hussards; 22e Chasseurs à Cheval; 8e Dragons; Hanoverian Chasseurs
	Artillery (1,645 total)	3 batteries (24 guns)
Corps total: 17,718 (14,676 infantry, 1,397 cavalry, 24 guns)

=== VI Corps ===
Marshal Michel Ney

Division	Brigade	Regiments and Others
1st Division GD Jean Gabriel Marchand (6,671 total)	1st Brigade GB Antoine Louis Popon de Maucune	6e Légère (3 bns); 69e Ligne (3 or 4 bns)
1st Division GD Jean Gabriel Marchand (6,671 total)	2nd Brigade GB Pierre-Louis Binet de Marcognet	39e Ligne (3 or 4 bns); 76e Ligne (3 or 4 bns)
2nd Division GD Julien Augustin Joseph Mermet (7,616 total)	1st Brigade GB Bardet	25e Légère; 27e Ligne
2nd Division GD Julien Augustin Joseph Mermet (7,616 total)	2nd Brigade GB Labassée	50e Ligne; 59e Ligne
3rd Division GD Louis Henri Loison (6,750 total)	1st Brigade GB Simon (3,250 total)	26e Ligne; Légion du Midi; Légion Hannoverienne
3rd Division GD Louis Henri Loison (6,750 total)	2nd Brigade GB Claude François Ferey (3,500 total)	2/32e Légère; 66e Ligne; 82e Ligne
	Cavalry Brigade GB Lamotte (1,680 total)	3e Hussards; 15e Chasseurs à Cheval
	Artillery (1,513 total)	4 batteries (32 guns)
Corps total: 24,306 (21,113 infantry, 1,680 cavalry, 32 guns)

=== VIII Corps ===
GD Jean-Andoche Junot

Division	Brigade	Regiments and Others
1st Division GD Bertrand Clausel (6,794 total)	1st Brigade GB Jean François Ménard (2,339 total)	4th Battalion, 19e Ligne; 4th Battalion, 25e Ligne; 4th Battalion, 28e Ligne; 4th Battalion, 34e Ligne
1st Division GD Bertrand Clausel (6,794 total)	2nd Brigade GB Eloi Charlemagne Taupin (1,949 total)	4th Battalion, 15e Légère; 4th Battalion, 46e Ligne; 4th Battalion, 75e Ligne
1st Division GD Bertrand Clausel (6,794 total)	3rd Brigade GB Roch Godard (2,507 total)	22e Ligne (4 bns)
2nd Division GD Jean Baptiste Solignac (7,226 total)	1st Brigade GB Pierre Guillaume Gratien (2,470 total)	15e Ligne (3 bns); 86e Ligne (3 bns)
2nd Division GD Jean Baptiste Solignac (7,226 total)	2nd Brigade GB Jean Guillaume Barthélemy Thomières (4,756 total)	65e Ligne (4 bns); Régiment Irlandais (2 bns); Prussian Regiment (1 bn)
	Cavalry Brigade GB Charles Marie Robert Escorches de Saint-Croix (k) (1,863 total)	1e Dragons (2 sqns); 2e Dragons (2 sqns); 4e Dragons (2 sqns); 9e Dragons (2 sqns); 14e Dragons (2 sqns); 26e Dragons (2 sqns)
	Artillery GD Louis François Foucher de Careil (981 total)	3 batteries (24 guns)
Corps total: 16,939 (14,020 infantry, 1,863 cavalry, 24 guns)

=== Reserves ===
Division	Brigade	Regiments and Others
Reserve Cavalry Division GD Louis-Pierre Montbrun (3,479 total)	1st Brigade GB Cavrois	14e Hussards; 19e Hussards; 27e Chasseurs à Cheval
Reserve Cavalry Division GD Louis-Pierre Montbrun (3,479 total)	2nd Brigade GB Philippe Antoine d'Ornano	19e Dragons; 21e Dragons
	Reserve Artillery (2,608 total)	8 batteries; Engineers, gendarmerie etc.
Corps total: 6,087 (3,479 cavalry, 64 guns)

== Anglo-Portuguese Army ==
Commander-in-Chief: Lt Gen Viscount Wellington

Army total: 51,768 (49,328 infantry, 210 cavalry, 60 guns)

Division	Brigade	Regiments and Others
1st Division Maj Gen Brent Spencer (7,053 total)	1st Brigade Col the Hon Edward Stopford (1,684 total)	1/Coldstream Guards; 1/3rd Guards; coy, 5/60th Rifles
1st Division Maj Gen Brent Spencer (7,053 total)	2nd Brigade Lt Col Lord Blantyre (1,516 total)	2/24th Foot; 1/42nd Foot; 1/61st Foot; coy, 5/60th Rifles
1st Division Maj Gen Brent Spencer (7,053 total)	3rd Brigade Maj Gen Baron Löw (2,061 total)	1st KGL Line; 2nd KGL Line; 5th KGL Line; 7th KGL Line; detachments, 1st & 2nd KGL Light Bns
1st Division Maj Gen Brent Spencer (7,053 total)	4th Brigade Col the Hon Edward Pakenham (1,792 total)	1/7th Foot; 1/79th Foot
1st Division Maj Gen Brent Spencer (7,053 total)	Artillery	von Rettberg's Battery, KGA
2nd Division Maj Gen Rowland Hill (5,737 total)	1st Brigade Maj Gen the Hon William Stewart (2,247 total)	1/3rd Foot; 2/31st Foot; 2/48th Foot; 2/66th Foot; coy, 5/60th Rifles
2nd Division Maj Gen Rowland Hill (5,737 total)	2nd Brigade Col William Inglis (1,818 total)	29th Foot; 1/48th Foot; 1/57th Foot
2nd Division Maj Gen Rowland Hill (5,737 total)	3rd Brigade Brig Gen Catlin Craufurd (1,672 total)	2/28th Foot; 2/34th Foot; 2/39th Foot
2nd Division Maj Gen Rowland Hill (5,737 total)	Artillery	de Rozierres' Portuguese Battery; da Cunha Preto's Portuguese Battery
3rd Division Maj Gen Thomas Picton (4,743 total)	1st Brigade Col Henry MacKinnon (1,808 total)	1/45th Foot; 1/74th Foot; 1/88th Foot
3rd Division Maj Gen Thomas Picton (4,743 total)	2nd Brigade Maj Gen Stafford Lightburne (1,160 total)	2/5th Foot; 2/83rd Foot; 5/60th Rifles (3 coys)
3rd Division Maj Gen Thomas Picton (4,743 total)	Portuguese Brigade Col José Joaquim Champalimaud (1,775 total)	9th Portuguese Line (2 bns); 21st Portuguese Line (1 bn)
3rd Division Maj Gen Thomas Picton (4,743 total)	Artillery	da Silva's Portuguese Battery; Freira's Portuguese Battery; Thompson's Battery, RA
4th Division Maj Gen the Hon Lowry Cole (7,400 total)	1st Brigade Brig Gen Alexander Campbell (2,109 total)	2/7th Foot; 1/11th Foot; 2/53rd Foot; coy, 5/60th Rifles
4th Division Maj Gen the Hon Lowry Cole (7,400 total)	2nd Brigade Col James Kemmis (2,448 total)	3/27th Foot; 1/40th Foot; 97th Foot
4th Division Maj Gen the Hon Lowry Cole (7,400 total)	Portuguese Brigade Col Richard Collins (2,843 total)	11th Portuguese Line (2 bns); 23rd Portuguese Line (2 bns)
4th Division Maj Gen the Hon Lowry Cole (7,400 total)	Artillery	Bull's Troop, RHA
5th Division Maj Gen James Leith (7,305 total)	British Brigade Lt Col James Stevenson Barnes (1,879 total)	1/3rd Foot; 1/9th Foot; 2/38th Foot
5th Division Maj Gen James Leith (7,305 total)	Spry's Portuguese Brigade Col William Spry (2,619 total)	3rd Portuguese Line (2 bns); 15th Portuguese Line (2 bns); Thomar Militia
5th Division Maj Gen James Leith (7,305 total)	Eben's Portuguese Brigade Col Frederick Baron Eben (2,807 total)	Loyal Lusitanian Legion (2 bns); 8th Portuguese Line (2 bns)
Light Division Brig Gen Robert Craufurd (3,787 total)	1st Brigade Lt Col Sidney Beckwith (1,896 total)	1/43rd Foot; 1/95th Rifles (4 coys); 3rd Caçadores
Light Division Brig Gen Robert Craufurd (3,787 total)	2nd Brigade Lt Col Robert Barclay (1,891 total)	1/52nd Foot; 1/95th Rifles (4 coys); 1st Caçadores
Light Division Brig Gen Robert Craufurd (3,787 total)	Artillery	Ross' Troop, RHA
Portuguese Division Maj Gen John Hamilton (4,940 total)	1st Brigade Brig Gen Archibald Campbell (2,250 total)	4th Portuguese Line (2 bns); 10th Portuguese Line (2 bns)
Portuguese Division Maj Gen John Hamilton (4,940 total)	2nd Brigade Brig Gen Luiz Fonseca (2,690 total)	2nd Portuguese Line (2 bns); 14th Portuguese Line (2 bns)
Independent Portuguese Brigades	1st Independent Portuguese Brigade Brig Gen Denis Pack (2,769 total)	1st Portuguese Line (2 bns) - Major Thomas Noel Hill; 16th Portuguese (Vieira Telles) Line (2 bns); 4th Caçadores
Independent Portuguese Brigades	5th Independent Portuguese Brigade Brig Gen Alexander Campbell (3,249 total)	6th Portuguese Line (2 bns); 18th Portuguese Line (2 bns); 6th Caçadores
Independent Portuguese Brigades	6th Independent Portuguese Brigade Brig Gen Francis Coleman (2,345 total)	7th Portuguese Line (2 bns); 19th Portuguese Line (2 bns); 2nd Caçadores
	Cavalry (210 total)	4th Dragoons (2 sqns)
	Reserve Artillery Brig Gen Edward Howarth (2,230 total)	Lawson's Company; Cleeves' Battery, KGA; Passos' Portuguese Battery
Corps total: 51,768 (49,328 infantry, 210 cavalry, 60 guns)

== Notes ==
- Glover, Michael (2001). The Peninsular War 1807-1814. London: Penguin. ISBN 0-141-39041-7.
- Lipscombe, Nick (2010). The Peninsular War Atlas. Oxford: Osprey. ISBN 978-1-84908-364-5.
