= Reverse slope defence =

Military tactic

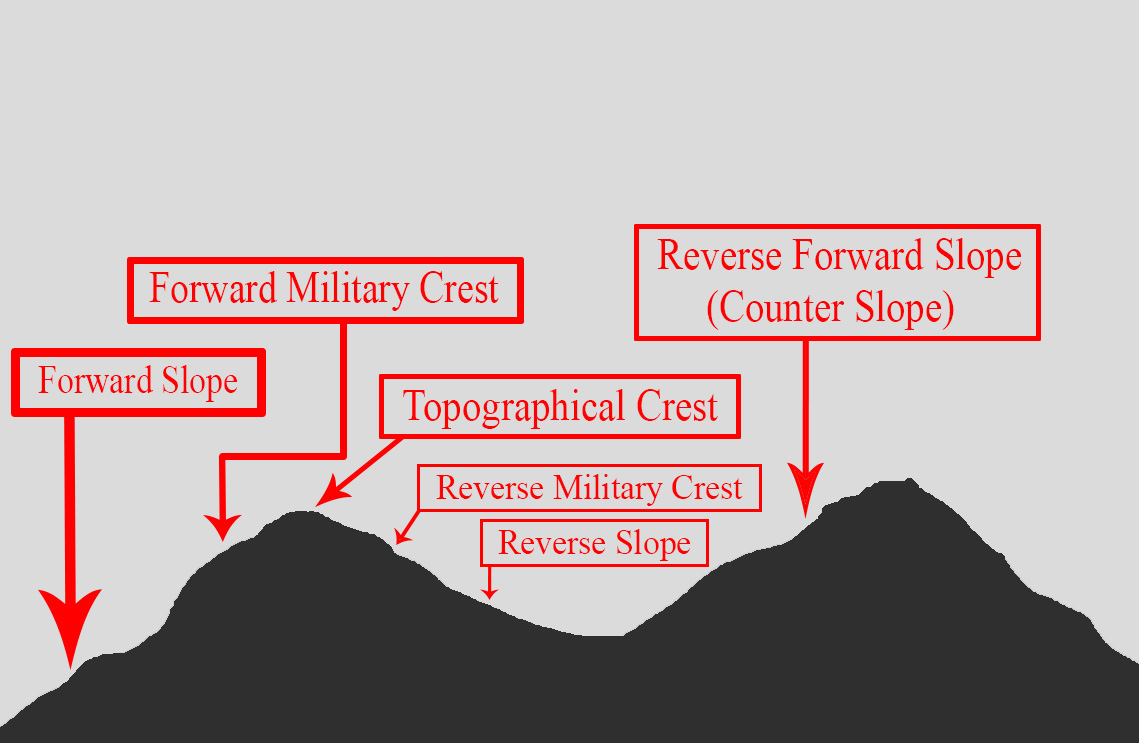
Reverse slope defence; the picture shows the reverse slope and crests

A reverse slope defence is a military tactic where a defending force is positioned on the slope of an elevated terrain feature such as a hill, ridge, or mountain, on the side opposite from the attacking force. This tactic both hinders the attacker's ability to observe the defender's positions and reduces the effectiveness of the attacker's long-range weapons such as tanks and artillery.

A defending unit usually does not conduct a reverse-slope defence along its entire front, as positioning troops on the forward slope is necessary to control the region in front of the hill. However, when enemy forces are known to have superior long-range direct-fire or indirect-fire weapons, the majority of the defending force can use the hill to limit enemy observation and reduce the effectiveness of the long-range enemy fire. This tactic may even succeed in deceiving the enemy as to the true location and organisation of the main defensive positions. Typically, a smaller unit is still posted on the forward slope to perform observation and delay attackers if the defending force needs to relocate its main body onto the forward slope. Otherwise, when the attacker advances and passes over the top of the hill, they may be ambushed by short-range fire from the defender on the reverse slope and perhaps on the counterslope (the forward slope of a hill facing the reverse slope). Combat vehicles are vulnerable when cresting hills, because their thin belly armour may be exposed to troops on the reverse slope and because their weapons may lack the depression angle to effectively engage an enemy located below the vehicle.

== Historical examples ==
=== Napoleonic Wars ===
The best-known proponent of the tactic was the Duke of Wellington, who used it repeatedly during the Napoleonic Wars to defeat French infantry, such as at the Battle of Waterloo, the last major military engagement of the Napoleonic Wars. By placing a ridge between his own army and his opponent's, and having his troops lie down, Wellington was able both to better protect his troops from French artillery fire and to strike the attacking French infantry by having his troops stand up at the last moment and deliver volleys of musketry at close range. At Waterloo, Wellington utilized this reverse slope tactic to drive away a last minute infantry attack by the French in a final attempt to gain victory by Napoleon. The French infantry had climbed a ridge only to find it seemingly abandoned and covered with bodies. Suddenly, 1,500 British Foot Guards under Maitland who had been lying down under the ridge rose and unleashed upon them close range, point-blank volleys, killing 300 with the very first volley alone, resulting in the decimation of a large part of Napoleon's elite infantry reserve, the hitherto undefeated Imperial Guard, followed by a British charge which resulted in the retreat and collapse of the French lines, turning the tide of the Battle into a decisive Anglo-Prussian victory and marking the end of the Napoleonic Wars. (Note: Infantry Tactics and Combat during the Napoleonic Wars ~ Part 3 ~ Columns. This article argues that all armies of the period used column formations at times on the battlefield, the military historian Sir Charles Oman is credited with developing the theory that the French practically always attacked in heavy columns, and it is only now that this alleged error, propagated by other British and American authors, is being repudiated. (see also Historical revisionism: French attack formations in the Napoleonic wars))

During the battle of Waterloo, Napoleon's troops stormed and captured the farm of La Haye Sainte close to the allied lines, bringing artillery batteries here which greatly increased the effectiveness of the artillery fire on Wellington's position. The French were on the verge of breaking through Wellington's defences. But due to Blücher's arrival on the flank and rear, the French army became a "taut string," and ultimately, after the numerically inferior Middle Guard failed to break its opponents following some success, (It was this part of the Guard that took part in the attack.) the farm was quickly abandoned in the panic of rout. The Guard was the Emperor's last uncommitted tactical reserve, that is why he threw it towards the allied center, and he needed to defeat the Anglo-allies as quickly as possible, since the Prussians were in a threatening position. (Note: See Waterloo article)

At the Battle of Arcole (during the French Revolutionary Wars), Napoleon's troops used a similar action, hiding on the leeward side of a small dam to escape the fire. However, it was not Napoleon's nature to hide behind ridges, redoubts, etc. His maxim of the war was: "Where is the enemy? Let us go and fight him!"

At the Battle of Wagram, the Austrian jäger troops of Archduke Charles took cover in a drainage ditch in order to allow the French columns to come close and then deliver a devastating volley against them. (Note: See Wagram article)

At the Battle of Austerlitz, Russian horse artillery battery under Lieutenant Colonel Pyotr Kozen^{[ru]} and the Life Guard Horse Regiment broke French square under Major Bigarre and took its Eagle. Bigarre writes:

[…] Captain Vincent, who proceded my scouts, discovered on the reverse slope a considerable mass of cavalry […] I went in person to see what this column was. Hardly were we on the plateau that dominated the two reverse slopes, than we saw them advancing at a fast trot to meet us. I returned to the battalion and ordered it form square.

3 squadrons of cavalrymen encircled the square, lost several men and horses and withdrew. Kozen had advanced and unlimbered his cannons 200 metres (660 ft) from the French. They fired 5 canister shots at the square and inflicted serious casualties. The French were thrown into disorder. Colonel Olenin then led 2 other squadrons of Lifeguard Horse and broke the shaken square. Guardsman Gavrilov spotted the Eagle on the ground, so he quickly dismounted his horse and retrieved it just before bayonets struck him on both sides. Three privates—Ushakov, Omelchenko, and Glazunov—charged in and used their swords to fend off the enemy infantry. They successfully delivered the Eagle to the delighted Grand Duke Constantine. The French suffered 218 killed and wounded. Bigarre received 25 saber wounds, and the French Eagle-bearer received 20 saber wounds.

During the battle of Auerstedt, Marshal Davout hid his light cavalry behind a hillock and then sent them into battle as a coup de grâce against General Blücher's cavalry, already shocked by Davout's infantry and artillery. (Note: See Jena–Auerstedt article)

Climbing hills for an attack was a difficult task for the British infantry as well. For example, during the Battle of Salamanca, Denis Pack's brigade failed to successfully attack Great Arapile Hill. Despite a numerical advantage (2,600 men to 1,800), the steep climb slowed the soldiers' advance, exhausted them, and caused shortness of breath and disorder. Clearly, this task was too difficult for Pack's brigade, and the decision to attack, made by either Wellington or Pack, proved erroneous. According to British artilleryman Lieutenant Ingilby, Wellington's infantry on Arapile "[…] advanced to within musket shot of the crest of the hill, but were suddenly driven back and overwhelmed by the fire of the French, who had screened their force on the slope of the opposite side of the hill."

French attacks on hills were rarely successful. Colonel Waller of the 2nd British Division observed the French attack on Thomas Picton's "Fighting Division" in 1810 at the Battle of Bussaco:

At this moment were seen the heads of the several columns, three I think, in number and deploying into line with the most beautiful precision, celerity and gallantry. As they formed on the plateau, they were cannonaded from our position and the regiment of Portuguese […] threw in some volleys of musketry into the enemy's columns in a flank direction, but the (Portuguese) regiment was quickly driven into the position […] the (French) columns advanced in despite of a tremendous fire of grape and musketry from our troops in position in the rocks, and overcoming all opposition although repeatedly charged by Lightburne's Brigade, or rather the whole of Picton's Division, they advanced and fairly drove the British right wing from the rocky part of this position.

At the Battle of San Marcial, the Spanish infantry adopted the British tactic of opening fire and then charging with bayonets. After a brief resistance, the French retreated.

=== American Civil War ===
Examples of reverse slope defense during the American Civil War included Stonewall Jackson's defense of Henry House Hill during the First Battle of Bull Run (also known as Manassas) (1861), where he ordered his soldiers to lie down below the crest of the hill in order to avoid Union artillery, and Winfield Scott Hancock's counter-attack against Jubal Early at the Battle of Williamsburg (1862). The Battle of Gettysburg (1863) was another example, especially the Union defense against Pickett's Charge, which was greatly aided by the reverse slope of Cemetery Ridge that both protected and hid infantry and large numbers of cannons that could not be easily seen by the attackers.

=== World War I ===
Germany employed the reverse slope defence on the Hindenburg Line on the Western Front during the latter part of World War I. The belligerents on both sides on the Western Front had settled into a war of attrition fought from established trenches. Patches of territory were won or lost only at great cost. Years of attrition had left both sides stretched thin in manpower and materiel along the front. Germany recognised this problem early and devised Operation Alberich as an answer to it. Operation Alberich involved the construction, through the late winter of 1917, of a new and shorter line (the Hindenburg Line) of defensive fortifications along a high ridge using reverse slope techniques, with massive artillery gun placements protected to the rear by the topography of the ridge, followed by a strategic retreat from their existing tattered front to positions behind the new line.

=== World War II ===
After the capture of Carentan by American paratroopers, German forces (elements of the 17th SS Panzergrenadier Division and 6th Fallschirmjäger Regiment) counterattacked in an attempt to recapture this strategically vital town on 13 June 1944. Elements of the U.S. 101st Airborne Division (502nd and 506th Parachute Infantry Regiments (PIR)) met the enemy advance southwest of Carentan at the Battle of Bloody Gulch.

The terrain offered the Americans the opportunity of a reverse slope defence, and three companies of the 506th PIR lined up along the hedgerows at the bottom of Hill 30. The American troops were outnumbered and being hit with tank and assault gun fire, but the reverse incline enabled them to direct all their firepower at the Germans as they appeared over the top of the hill. Although they were almost overrun, their position gave them enough of an advantage to hold their ground until they were relieved by the U.S. 2nd Armored Division.

Reverse slope defenses were very popular with the Japanese during the island campaigns in the Pacific theater. American superiority in naval support artillery prompted the Japanese to shelter on reverse slopes until they could engage American troops at close range.

=== Other examples ===
- In the 1966 Battle of Long Tan
- Valley of Tears, during the 1973 Yom Kippur War
- In the 1982 Battle of Wireless Ridge, Argentine defensive positions were positioned on the forward slopes. When the British 2nd Battalion, The Parachute Regiment (2 Para) occupied these Argentine positions, they were on a reverse slope, protected from Argentine artillery fire.
- In the 1991 Battle of 73 Easting, M1A1 tanks of Eagle Troop led by Captain McMaster crested a hill and surprised an Iraqi tank company set up in a reverse slope defence on the 70 Easting. They immediately engaged the Iraqi tanks and destroyed the company.

== See also ==
- Hull-down
- Defilade
