= Thomas Keate =

Thomas Keate (1745–1821) was an English surgeon. He became a Fellow of the Royal Society in 1794.

== Early life ==
He was the son of William Keate of Wells, Somerset, and Oxford graduate, and younger brother of the Rev. William Keate (1739–1795), father of John Keate of Eton and Robert Keate. A number of sources identify his father as an apothecary in Wells, who became its Mayor.

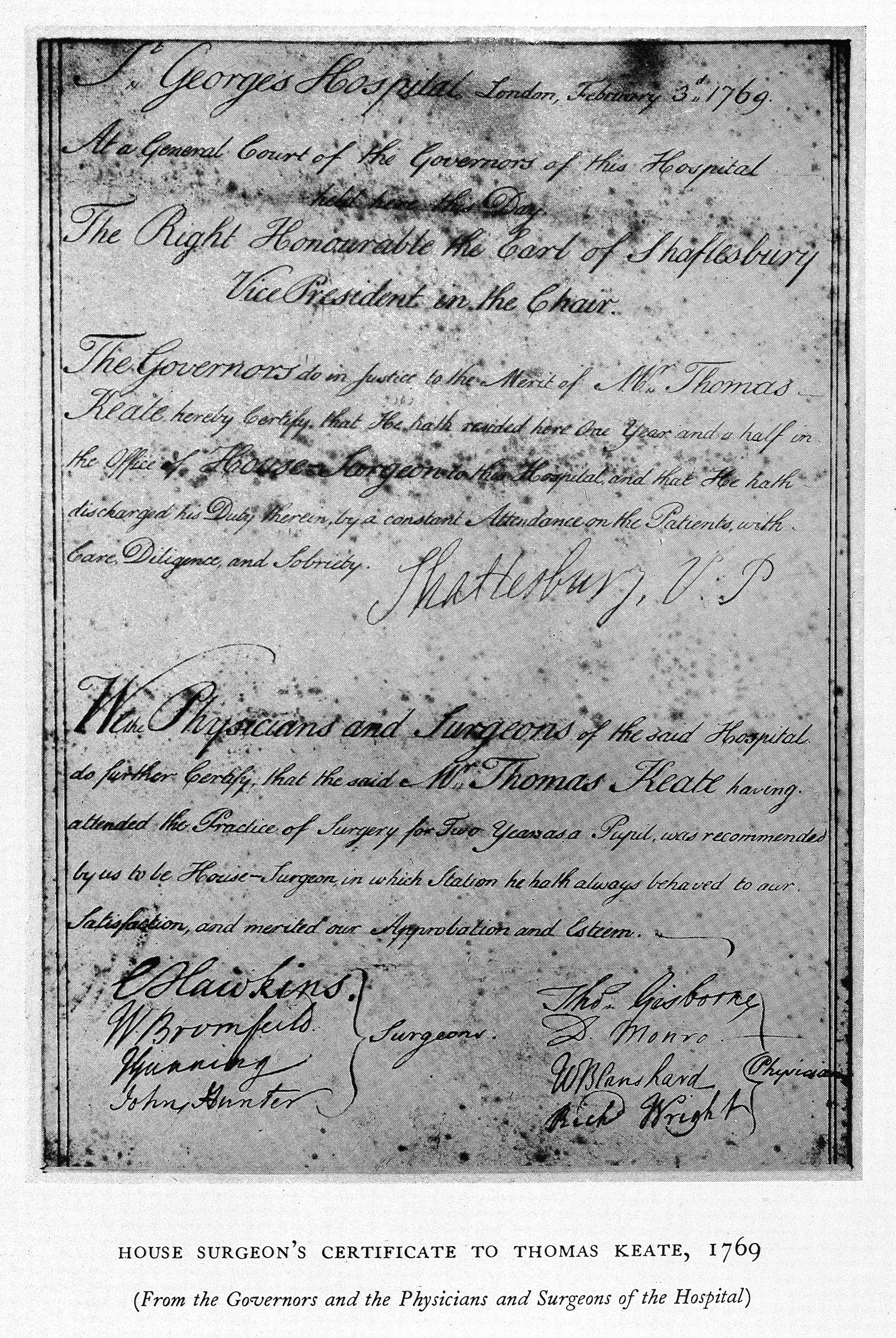
House surgeon certificate for Thomas Keate at St George's Hospital, dated 1769 and signed John Hunter

Keate became a pupil at St George's Hospital, London, and later was assistant to John Gunning, surgeon to the hospital. He was appointed regimental surgeon to the 1st Foot Guards in 1778.

== Medical career ==
Keate was surgeon to George, Prince of Wales, afterwards George IV, from 1783 to 1800; he joined the Prince's household set up on his majority, and was a favourite introduced to others of the royal family. The low point in the Prince's health came, in his judgement, in 1787, when he was "exceedingly ill". Keate was surgeon to Queen Charlotte of Mecklenburg-Strelitz from 1791 to 1803. His 1793 nomination certificate for the Royal Society begins with his royal service.

In 1790 Robert Adair died: he had been surgeon to Chelsea Hospital. Keate was appointed, with a salary. The post at the time was described as close to a sinecure. On a vacancy arising in the surgeoncy at St George's Hospital, in succession to Charles Hawkins, there was a sharp contest in 1792 between Keate and Everard Home, whom John Hunter favoured: Keate was elected.

Keate was an examiner at the College of Surgeons from 1800, and master in 1802, 1809, 1818. Representing the College, he witnessed an 1803 electric demonstration with a corpse by Giovanni Aldini in London, accompanied by Joseph Constantine Carpue. As a surgeon, he was the first to tie the subclavian artery for aneurysm.

=== Army surgeon ===
Hunter died in 1793, to be succeeded as Surgeon-General to the Army by Gunning, and as Inspector of Regimental Infirmaries by Keate. Keate inspected the Savoy Hospital in October of that year, finding six beds in a noisy situation because of prisoners. After Gunning's death in 1798, Keate reunited the posts, becoming also Surgeon-General.

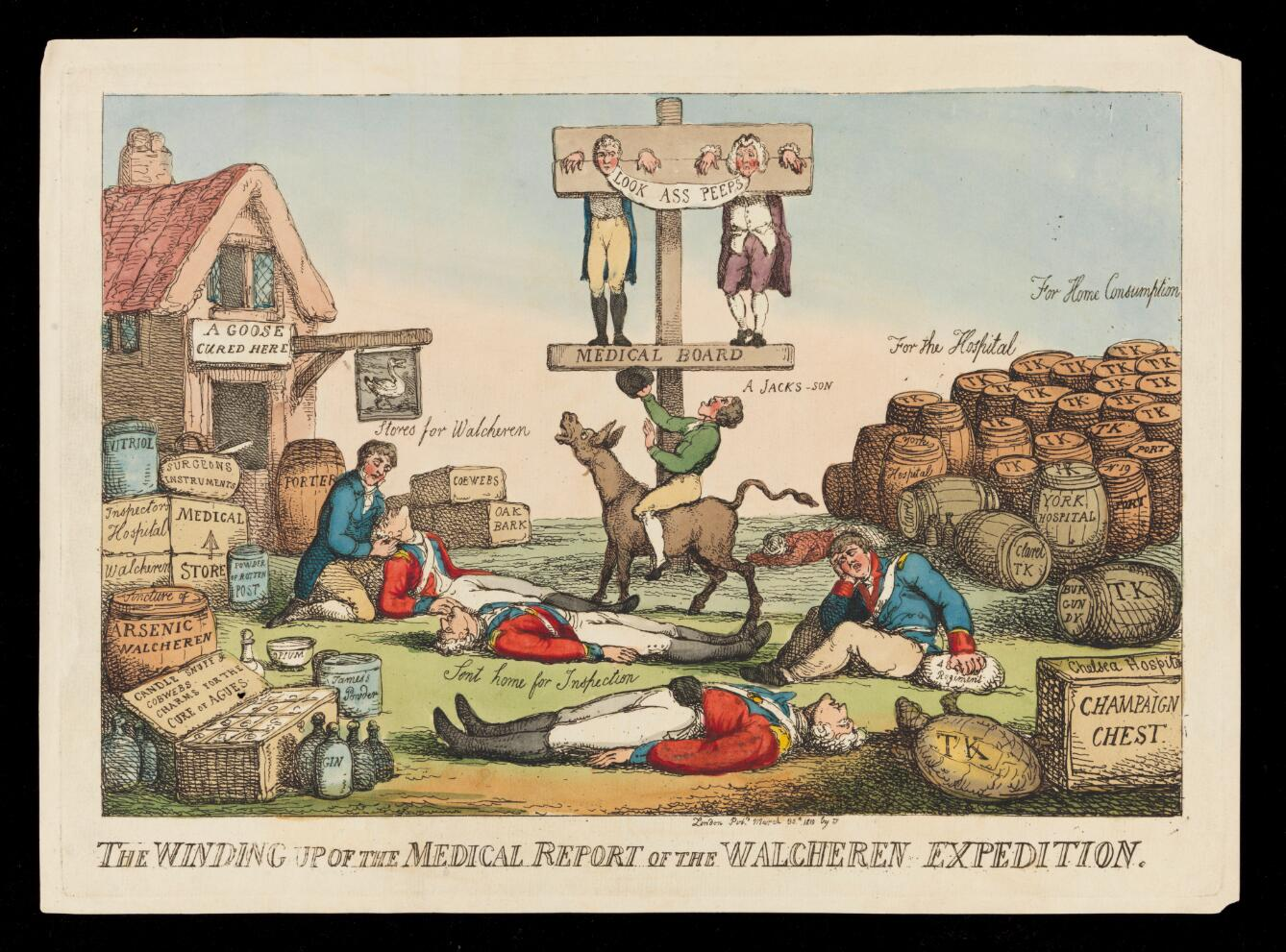
The Winding up of the Medical Report of the Walcheren Expedition, 1810 satirical engraving by Thomas Rowlandson, in the pillory Thomas Keate (left) and Sir Lucas Pepys (right)

With Lucas Pepys, Keate was blamed for a lack of medical resources and attention in the Walcheren Campaign of 1809. Keate had attended some of the boatloads of wounded soldiers brought up the River Thames. As part of incremental changes in the direction of reform, the existing Army Medical Board of Keate, Pepys and Francis Knight (Inspector-General of Army Hospitals from 1801) was replaced in 1810 by one headed by John Weir, with Theodore Gordon and Charles Ker.

== Later life ==
Unpunctual and slovenly in his hospital duties, in 1813 Keate resigned his appointment at St George's.

Keate opposed the claims made by the surgeon Sir William Adams to have an effective cure for a type of ophthalmia. Adams in 1817 set up a specialised treatment facility within Chelsea Hospital for what is now recognised as a form of trachoma, afflicting soldiers who had served in the Egyptian campaign. With Benjamin Moseley of the Hospital and William North, Keate in 1818 produced outcomes research casting doubt on Adams's treatment. Adams that year moved on started treating gratis for ophthalmia in a new Ophthalmia Hospital built by John Nash on Albany Street, with backing from the Prince Regent. He continued there to 1822.

Keate died at Chelsea Hospital on 5 July 1821, aged 76.

== Works ==
On surgery, Keate wrote Cases of Hydrocele and Hernia, London, 1788. In controversy he produced Observations on the Fifth Report of the Commissioners of Medical Enquiry, London, 1808; the report had censured points in Keate's administration.

== Family ==
Keate married in 1784 Emma Browne, daughter of Lyde Browne.
