= John Gunning (surgeon) =

English surgeon (1734–1798)

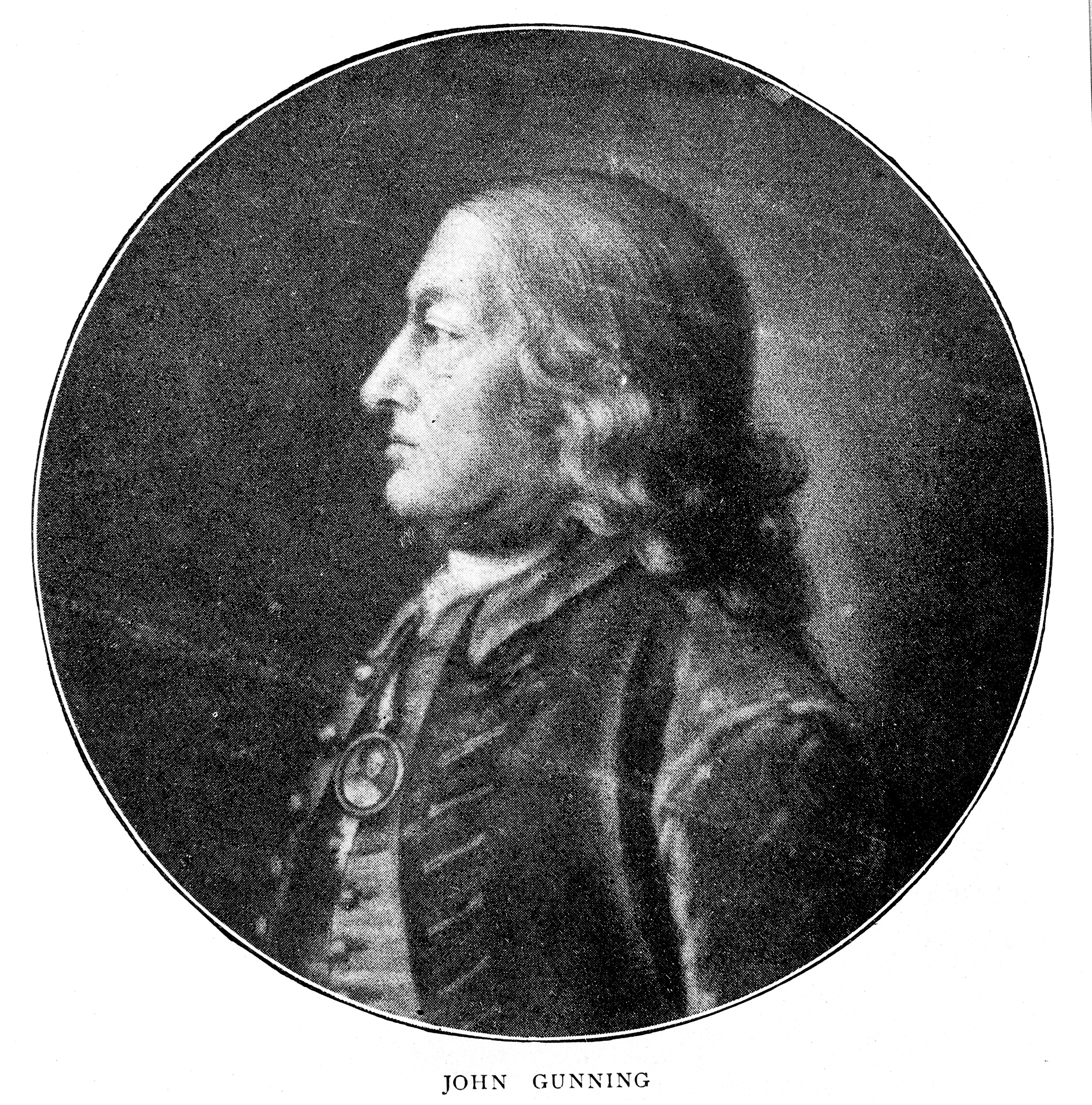

John Gunning (1734–1798), was an English surgeon.

== Background and early career ==
He was born at Swainswick, the son of John Gunning (died 1774) and his wife Elizabeth Lymen; and was educated at Winchester College from 1747. The eldest son, he was disinherited by his father.

Gunning was the assistant surgeon to St. George's Hospital, London, from 21 January 1760 to 4 January 1765, and full surgeon from that date till his death. In 1773 he was elected Steward of Anatomy by the Surgeons' Company, but paid a fine rather than serve. In 1789 he was elected Examiner on the death of Percivall Pott, and in the same year he was chosen Master of the Company, and signalised his year of office by a firm effort to reform its administration and reorganise its work.

In attacking the perquisites of the courts of assistants and of examiners he was outspoken. His philippic on retiring from office on 1 July 1790 was preserved by John Flint South:

"Your theatre", he says, in his last address, "is without lectures, your library-room without books is converted into an office for your clerk, and your committee-room is become his eating-parlour … If, gentlemen, you make no better use of the hall than what you have already done, you had better sell it, and apply the money for the good of the company in some other way".

The Court of Assistants appointed a committee to consider the question, and reforms were effected. In 1790 Gunning was appointed the first professor of surgery; but he soon resigned on the plea that it occupied too much of his time, and no new appointment was made.

Gunning was appointed Surgeon-General of the army in 1793, on the death of John Hunter; he was also senior Surgeon Extraordinary to George.

== Conflict with John Hunter ==
Gunning was in general opposed to his colleague at St. George's, John Hunter, who was frequently overbearing to his professional brethren, and appeared to them to neglect the proper business of a surgeon for unpractical pursuits. The quarrel rose to a great pitch when a surgeon was elected in succession to Charles Hawkins (1750–1816), who had resigned. Thomas Keate (1745–1821) was supported by Gunning, and Everard Home by Hunter, and after a sharp contest Keate was elected. A dispute ensued about fees for surgical lectures, which led to a controversy between Gunning, senior surgeon, supported by two of his colleagues, and Hunter. It ended in John Hunter's death on 16 October 1793.

== The sale of Surgeon's Hall ==
In 1796 it was determined to sell the Surgeons' Hall on account of the expense attending its repair; but on 7 July Gunning, on behalf of the committee, reported that as no one had bid within £200 of the price set upon it, it had been bought in. At the same court Henry Cline was elected a member of the Court of Assistants, in the absence of a governor (one having just died, and the other being blind and paralysed in Warwickshire). This voided the charter. A bill brought into parliament in 1797 to indemnify the company, and to give it greater power over the profession, after passing the commons, was lost in the House of Lords by the influence of Thurlow, owing, it is said, to a grudge against Gunning. Thurlow having said, "There's no more science in surgery than in butchery" (a remark apparently prompted by his brother's death while undergoing treatment by Hunter). Gunning had retorted: "Then, my lord, I heartily pray that your lordship may break your leg, and have only a butcher to set it".

Gunning died at Bath on 14 February 1798.

== Family ==
Gunning married in 1768 Dorothy, sister of Richard Warren, Physician to the King. They had five children, a son John (1777–1847) who did not marry, and four daughters. His nephew John Gunning (1773–1863) became a military surgeon; he was son of the Rev. Joseph Gunning (died 1806).
