= Francis Knight (surgeon) =

British surgeon

Francis Knight (c. 1748 – 1832) was a British surgeon, an army medical man as well as a society doctor with court connections, who became Inspector of Military Hospitals in 1802.

== Life to 1801 ==
Knight was according to research of the antiquarian Henry Longden Isham a grandson of Walter Chapman (1676–1761), son of John Chapman of Puddletown, Dorset; and had an uncle George Chapman with a court connection.

In 1780 Knight became medical officer of the Coldstream Guards. In time, his work there brought him to the notice of Prince Frederick, Duke of York and Albany. He became a surgeon extraordinary to George III. He was impressed by a vaccination carried out by Wathen Phipps, an eye doctor also with a court position. He became a vaccinator himself, and in 1799 vaccinated two of the children of Mrs Jordan and the Duke of Clarence.

== Army Medical Board ==
When John Rush, Inspector of Regimental Hospitals, died in 1801 at the end of the year, his replacement was Knight, who was given the broader job description of Inspector of Army Hospitals. The position gave him the third seat on the Army Medical Board, instituted at the outbreak of the French Revolutionary Wars. His approach to appointments and promotions in his sector was immediately contentious. He deprecated the past use of bribery to obtain position, but he disregarded conventions on time of service. Charles Maclean, a disaffected medical man and critic of the Board as a whole, wrote in 1810 that Knight's approach was a "nefarious job".

Knight's expertise was with the well-run regimental hospital of the Coldstream Guards. Thomas Keate, on the Board as Surgeon-General to the Army, had control of the general hospitals. The Helder Expedition saw Keate set up in 1799 temporary general hospitals in East Anglia for returning wounded soldiers, at Colchester, Harwich and Great Yarmouth. At the period of the Peace of Amiens there were two army general hospitals in the country: the Duke of York's Hospital at Chelsea, London, purpose-built for the care of wounded soldiers returning from service abroad; and at Ealing the hospital for Hanoverian troops. More general hospitals were then set up in England and Scotland, in buildings found for the purpose. Among changes Knight made were cost-cutting in regimental hospitals, and efforts to close down general hospitals. By 1806 the coastal general hospitals at Deal, Kent, Gosport and Plymouth were no longer operating. There remained the Duke of York's Hospital, and one at Newport, Isle of Wight.

During 1806 Knight paid attention to trachoma, known at the time as "Egyptian ophthalmia". He visited the hospital at Selsey, where John Vetch as a hospital mate had developed effective treatment for the ophthalmia infection that had prevailed in British Army veterans since the French campaign in Egypt and Syria. Knight backed Vetch with the executive decision that the Selsey hospital should be turned into an ophthalmia treatment centre.

Knight was replaced by his deputy James Borland in 1807. The Board ran into serious trouble from the outset of the Peninsular War, and there was parliamentary enquiry in 1807. By the time of the battle of Corunna, in January 1809, there was a question about the Board's competence. It was common ground that they were not experienced in military matters. There was contention within the Board.

Especially after the heavy loss of life to infectious disease from the Walcheren Expedition of 1809, there was an outcry from politicians. Knight's past conduct on the Army Medical Board was still the subject of serious criticism by his former colleagues Keate and Lucas Pepys, in relation in particular to the 1805 appointment of Borland as his assistant, patronage as applied to inspector posts, and encroachment. The extent of the contention was made public in 1810. By that point, Borland's associate Robert Jackson had in 1809 assaulted Keate, and received a prison sentence of six months.

In the political furore, the Walcheren campaign was ended by the government on the advice of Gilbert Blane; and the Board's structure was replaced by a new Army Medical Department.

== Later life ==
When a friendly society was set up in 1816, for the widows of army medical and hospital staff, by James McGrigor, Knight became its President. McGrigor had been one of the deputy inspectors-general he had appointed, in 1805.

Knight died at his home on Savile Row on 17 January 1832, at age 84.
