= John Taylor Warren =

English physician

- Born: 1771
- Died: 6 October 1849 (aged 77–78); Brighton
- Occupation: Physician

John Taylor Warren (1771 – 6 October 1849) was an English physician.

== Biography ==
Warren was born in 1771. He was the son of Thomas Warren of Dunstable, Bedfordshire. He entered Merchant Taylors' school in 1780, and afterwards studied medicine at St. George's Hospital, where he became a favourite pupil of the great surgeon, John Hunter. At the outbreak of war at the French revolution, Warren was appointed assistant surgeon in the 20th dragoons, a regiment raised for service in Jamaica. After serving in that island for some time he was ordered to St. Domingo. There he was appointed surgeon of Keppel's black regiment, but before joining, owing to the mortality among European officers, he was nominated surgeon to the 23rd infantry or Welsh fusiliers, and thence was promoted to the post of staff surgeon to the forces. In 1797 he returned to England with invalids, and, having distinguished himself by his activity and skill, he was placed at the recruiting depôt in Chatham barracks, subsequently at Gosport, and finally in the Isle of Wight, where he gained the friendship of Sir George Hewett, the commander of the forces stationed there.

In 1805 Warren was appointed deputy-inspector of military hospitals, and was placed in charge of the home department. In 1808 he proceeded to Spain with a detachment of English troops, and, after being present at Vimiero, accompanied Sir John Moore on his expedition. When the troops embarked at Coruña he was placed in charge of the wounded, and was the last English officer to leave the shore. In 1816 he was appointed inspector-general of hospitals, succeeding his friend James Borland in the Mediterranean station. He retired from the regular service in 1820. He acted for many years as vice-president of the Army Medical Benevolent Society for Orphans, and as trustee of the Society for the Widows of Medical Officers. In 1843, in recognition of his services, a silver vase was presented him by his brother officers and friends. He died on 6 October 1849 at his house on the Marine Parade, Brighton, and was buried in the family vault at South Warnborough, Hampshire, where his brother, Thomas Alston Warren, was rector. In 1800 he married Amelia, daughter of the Chevalier Ruspini. She survived him, leaving an only daughter.
