= St George's Hospital =

Hospital in Tooting, London

Coordinates: 51.4267°N 0.1757°W

- St George's University Hospitals NHS Foundation Trust
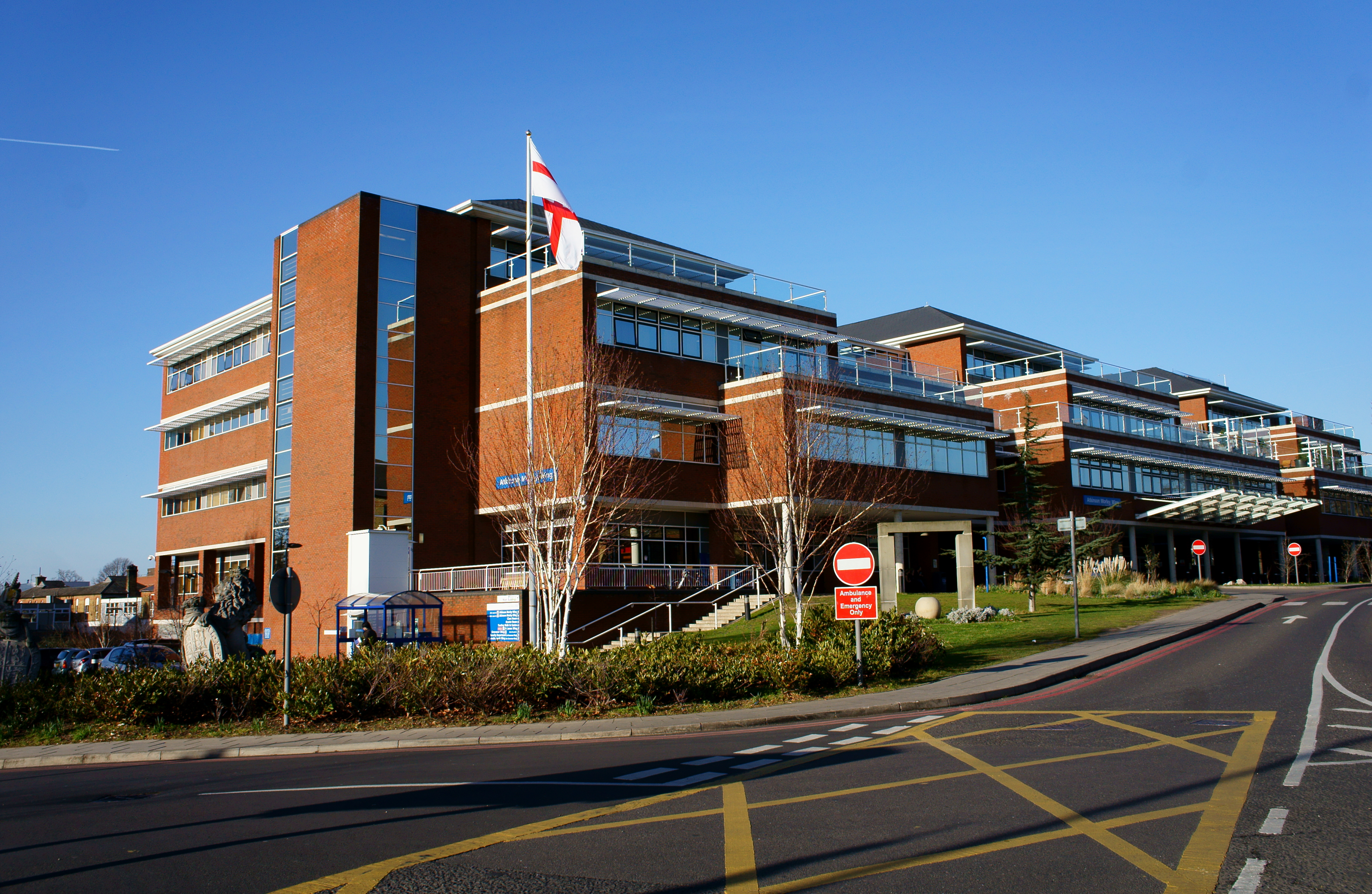

- Shown in Wandsworth

Geography
- Location: Blackshaw Road; London; SW17 0QT

Organisation
- Care system: NHS England
- Type: Teaching
- Affiliated university: City St George's, University of London

Services
- Emergency department: Major Trauma Centre – (Adult and Children)
- Beds: 1,300

Helipads
- Helipad: Yes

History
- Founded: 1733; 293 years ago (Hyde Park Corner), 1976; 50 years ago (current site)
- Closed: 1980; 46 years ago (Hyde Park Corner)

Links
- Website: http://www.stgeorges.nhs.uk
- Other links: St George's University Hospitals NHS Foundation Trust

St George's Hospital is a large teaching hospital in Tooting, London. Founded in 1733, it is one of the UK's largest teaching hospitals. It is run by the St George's University Hospitals NHS Foundation Trust. It shares its main hospital site in Tooting in the London Borough of Wandsworth, with City St George's, University of London, which trains NHS staff and carries out advanced medical research.

The hospital has around 1,300 beds and most general tertiary care such as accident and emergency, maternity services and care for older people and children. However, as a major acute hospital, St George's Hospital also offers specialist care for the more complex injuries and illnesses, including trauma, neurology, cardiac care, renal transplantation, cancer care and stroke. It is also home to one of four major trauma centres and one of eight hyper-acute stroke units for London.

St George's Hospital also provides care for patients from a larger catchment area in the South East of England, for specialities such as complex pelvic trauma. Other services treat patients from all over the country, such as family HIV care and bone marrow transplantation for non-cancer diseases. The trust also provides a nationwide endoscopy training service.

== History ==
=== Early history ===
Following a disagreement between medical staff and the Board of Governors over the expansion of the Westminster Infirmary, a mass exodus of medical staff left, in 1733, to set up what became St George's Hospital. The Board of Governors had favoured a house in Castle Lane but the medical staff preferred Lanesborough House at Hyde Park Corner.

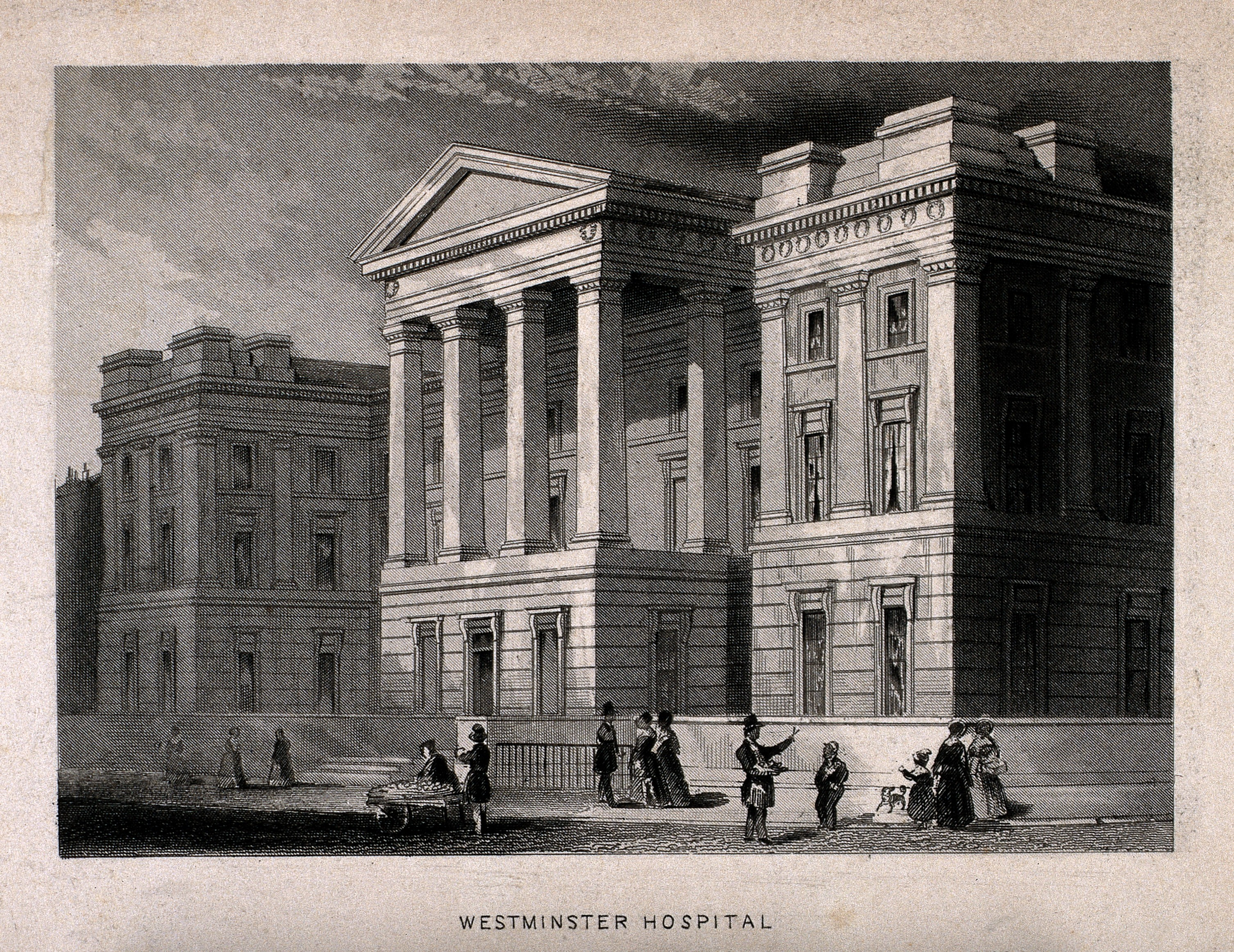
St George's Hospital, Hyde Park Corner

Lanesborough House, originally built in 1719 by James Lane, 2nd Viscount Lanesborough, was at that time located in open countryside. The new St George's Hospital was arranged on three floors and accommodated 30 patients in two wards: one for men and one for women. The hospital was gradually extended and, by 1744, it had fifteen wards and over 250 patients.

By the 1800s, the hospital was slipping into disrepair. The old Lanesborough House at Hyde Park Corner was demolished to make way for a new 350 bed facility designed by architect William Wilkins. Building began in 1827 and was completed by 1844.

A medical school was established in 1834 at Kinnerton Street and was incorporated into the hospital in 1868. The Medical School, now St George's, University of London, was built in the south-west corner of the hospital site in Hyde Park, with the main entrance in Knightsbridge and the back entrance in Grosvenor Crescent Mews.

By 1859, a critical shortage of beds led to the addition of an attic floor. This was soon insufficient and led to the creation of a new convalescent hospital, Atkinson Morley's in Wimbledon, freeing up beds at St George's for acute patients.

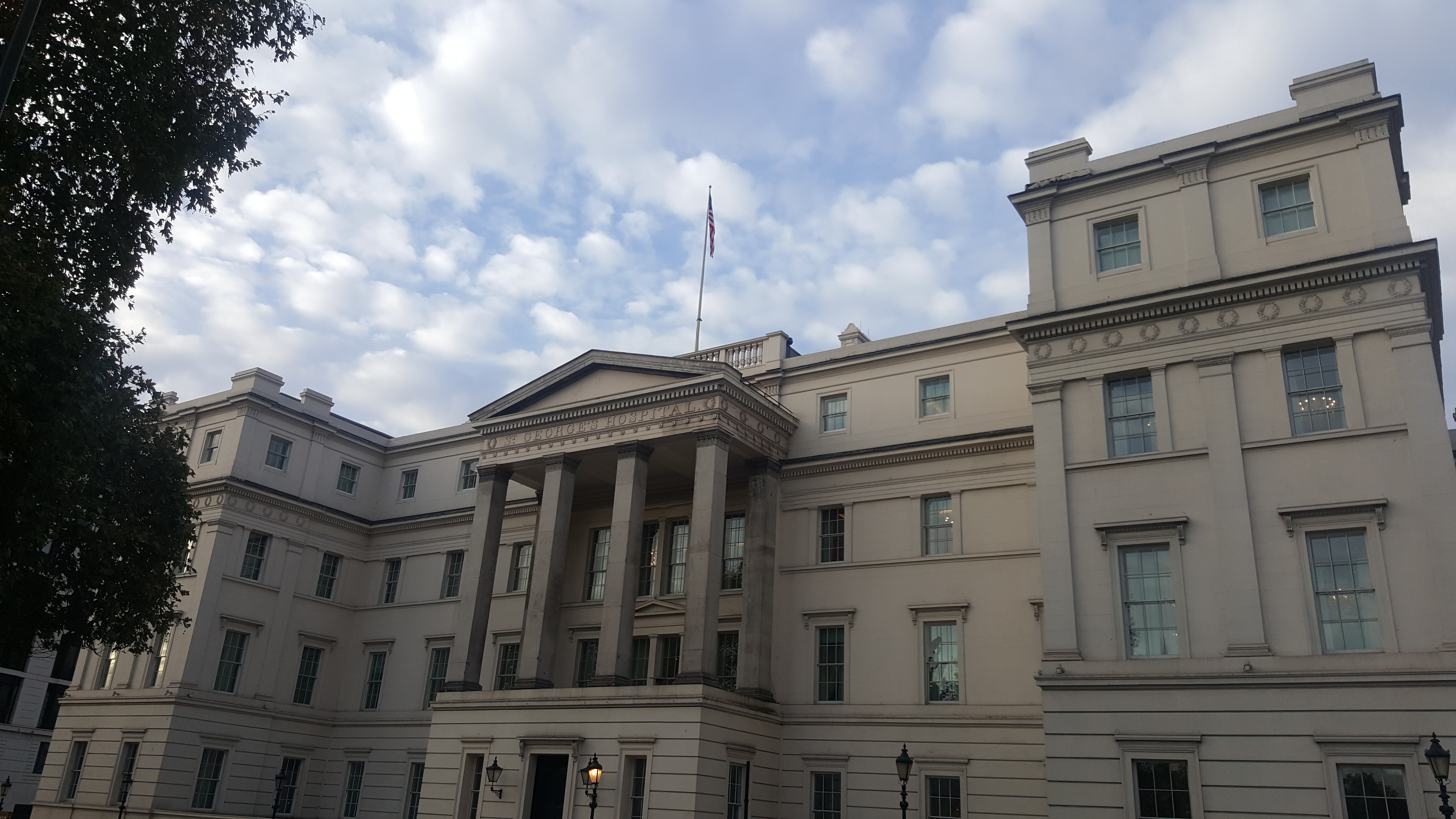
Former St George's Hospital at Hyde Park Corner (now The Lanesborough hotel)

In 1948, the National Health Service was introduced and plans for a new site for St George's at The Grove and Fountain Fever Hospitals at Tooting were eventually agreed upon. In 1954, the Grove Hospital became part of St George's, and clinical teaching started in Tooting.

After a new hospital had been built at Tooting, St George's Hospital at Hyde Park Corner closed its doors for the last time in 1980. The building still stands and is now The Lanesborough Hotel on the west side of Hyde Park Corner.

=== Relocation to Tooting ===
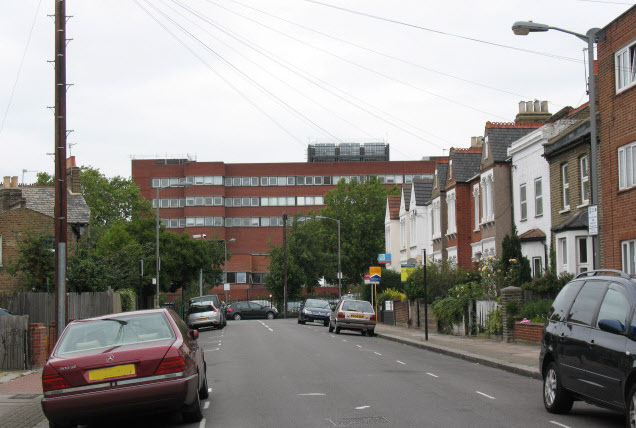
Hospital buildings in Tooting, 2008

The new hospital at Tooting was built in stages. The first stage, which included 710 beds and the medical school, was completed in 1976, although the main hospital was not completed until 1980.

In 1981, medical education in London was reorganised to recognise the movement of population away from the centre. There are now fewer, larger medical schools in London. The expansion of St George's, University of London (formerly St George's Hospital Medical School) has become part of this policy.

In 2004, neuroscience services located at Atkinson Morley Hospital in Wimbledon moved to the brand new Atkinson Morley Wing on the main St George's site. This addition to the hospital now also houses cardiac and cardiothoracic services which have moved from the old fever hospital wards. St George's today provides a total of over 1,000 beds making it one of the biggest in the country.

In April 2010 St George's Healthcare became part of the South West London and Surrey Trauma Network (SWLSTN). All Accident and Emergency (A&E) departments within the network continue to provide trauma services with St George's designated as the major trauma centre. It is one of a small number of A&E departments to benefit from Pearson Lloyd's redesign – 'A Better A&E' – which reduced aggression against hospital staff by 50 per cent. A system of environmental signage provides location-specific information for patients. Screens provide live information about how many cases are being handled and the current status of the A&E department. In October 2010 St George's Healthcare NHS Trust integrated with Community Services Wandsworth, after approval from NHS London.

In May 2014 the Trust's application for Foundation Trust status was approved by the NHS Trust Development Authority following a positive rating from the Care Quality Commission. In the last five years the trust has turned around a large deficit and repaid a debt of £34m. The TDA identified several areas that the trust will have to work on to ensure it gets through the final stages of FT assessment. These include improving its A&E performance against the four-hour waiting time target and putting together a robust operating plan for the next two years. From October 2014 the hospital's Accident and Emergency department has featured in the Channel 4 documentary series "24 Hours in A&E".

In August 2018 it was reported that the average death rate nationally among patients receiving cardiac surgery was 2%, but that the cardiac unit at St George's had experienced 3.7%. Toxic disputes between surgeons were blamed. Mike Bewick wrote a report claiming "inadequate" internal scrutiny of the department; also the surgeons were divided into "two camps" showing "tribal-like activity". Bewick stated, "In our view the whole team shares responsibility for the failure to significantly improve professional relationships and to a degree surgical mortality." The hospital maintained it was taking action.

== Notable students and staff ==
Among those who have been associated with St George's are:

- Katherine McCall Anderson, RRC & Bar, distinguished military and civilian nurse, matron from 1907 to 1914
- Rosena Allin-Khan, doctor and Labour MP for Tooting
- Sir William H. Bennett established a department of massage for the treatment of fractures
- Sir Benjamin Collins Brodie, 1st Baronet, English physiologist and surgeon who pioneered research into bone and joint disease
- Geoffrey Davies 1924–2008, Cardiology Technician who invented the British version of the cardiac pacemaker
- Clinton Thomas Dent, surgeon and mountaineer
- Cornwallis Hewett, Physician-Extraordinary to the King, William IV as well as Physician to St George's Hospital
- Sir Prescott Hewett, 1st Bt., Physician to the Queen and Serjeant Surgeon to Queen Victoria as well as Physician to St George's Hospital
- William Howship Dickinson, involved in the early characterisation of Alport syndrome
- Joseph Forlenze, ophthalmologist of the Napoleonic Empire
- Henry Gray, anatomist
- Dorinda Hafner, first black RN trained at the hospital
- Helen Hanks (nurse), matron from 1930 to 1947, distinguished nurse and matron during WWII
- Harry Hill, subsequently stand-up comedian and TV funny man
- John Hunter, father of modern surgery
- Edward Jenner, introduced vaccination for smallpox
- Henry Lee, surgeon, pathologist and syphilologist
- Henry Marsh, neurosurgeon and author of the bestselling memoir Do No Harm
- Peter H Millard Emeritus Professor of Geriatrics and inventor of Nosokinetics
- Atkinson Morley, philanthropist
- Humphry Osmond, pioneer of orthomolecular psychiatry and coiner of the word psychedelic
- George David Pollock, pioneer of skin grafts
- Muriel Powell (nurse), matron from 1947 to 1969, innovator in nursing practice and education, chief nurse of Scotland 1969-1976
- Juda Hirsch Quastel, biochemist, with discoveries in neuroscience, soil chemistry and cancer
- Marmaduke Sheild, surgeon who gave his name to the Sheild Professorship of Pharmacology at Cambridge University
- Paul Sinha, comedian
- Peter Sleight, internationally renowned cardiologist
- Sir Patrick Vallance, Government Chief Scientific Adviser (GCSA) and Head of the Government Science and Engineering (GSE) profession
- John Taylor Warren, military medical officer
- Thomas Spencer Wells, pioneer in abdominal surgery
- Edward Adrian Wilson, polar explorer and member of Robert Falcon Scott's ill-fated Terra Nova Expedition to the South Pole
- Thomas Young, physician, mathematician and hieroglyphicologist

== In the media ==
The old hospital was the subject of an impromptu poem by Letitia Elizabeth Landon.

The hospital is part of the long-running Channel 4 documentary series 24 Hours in A&E.

== Arms ==
Coat of arms of St George's Hospital
Notes Granted 28 February 1835 Crest On a wreath of the colours a lion rampant Or resting the forepaws on an antique shield charged with the figure of St George slaying the dragon Proper. Escutcheon Or the staff of Aesculapius in pale Proper surmounted by a celestial crown Azure. Supporters On the dexter side a figure representing Aesculapius Proper habited in a robe Purpure supporting with the left hand his staff also Proper and on the sinister side a figure representing Hygeia vested Argent holding in the exterior hand the patera and serpent Proper. Motto Deus Incubat Angui (May the Lord nurture the serpent [of Asclepius])

== See also ==
- List of hospitals in England
