= Helen Hanks =

- Born: 15 January 1886; Woolwich Arsenal, Kent, England
- Died: 16 July 1949 aged 63 years London, England
- Burial place: Plumstead Cemetery, London Borough of Greenwich
- Occupation: Nurse
- Honours: Associate Royal Red Cross Medal (ARRC)

Helen Hanks ARRC (15 January 1886 - 16 July 1949) was a British nurse and hospital matron at St. George's Hospital in London from 1910 until retirement in 1947.

== Early life ==
Helen Hanks was born in Plumstead, Kent on 15 January 1886. She was the second of seven children born to Henry John and Esther Hanks (née Martin). She attended Plumstead High Street School, leaving aged 13, in July 1899 having achieved Standard VI level. In the 1901 census aged 15, Hanks is recorded living away from her family in domestic servitude at a property in Plumstead, near to her family home.

== Early nursing career ==
In 1910, Hanks enrolled as a probationer nurse at St. George's Hospital, Hyde Park Corner, London, where she completed her training in 1913 and continued to work there for the entirety of her nursing career.

During WWI, Hanks was dedicated to the care of injured military personnel sometimes writing difficult letters to the families of the victims. In recognition of her contributions and by this time promoted to Ward Sister, she was awarded in 1919 the Royal Red Cross medal, second class – ARRC.

== Later nursing career ==
Hanks' nursing career progressed at St. George's from Nurse to Ward Sister, Night Superintendent, Sister Tutor, and finally Matron, a post that she held from 1930 until her retirement in 1947.

As Matron, Hanks occasionally met Prince George, Duke of Kent who was president of the hospital. As a sign of the esteem in which she was held, she was invited to attend a reception at St James's Palace for Princess Marina of Greece on the eve of her wedding to the Duke, on 29 November 1934.

During WWII, Hanks again helped to care for injured military personnel and civilians, victims of bombing in London. On 18 June 1944 the Guards' Chapel at Wellington Barracks, was largely destroyed by a V-1 flying bomb and Hanks cared for those injured. In 1947, shortly before her retirement, she unveiled a memorial plaque at the hospital dedicated to the hospital staff who died in the war.

== Retirement and death ==
Hanks retired from St. George's Hospital in the Spring of 1947, and moved to a flat in Mayfair less than half a mile away from the hospital. Muriel Powell succeeded her as the matron.

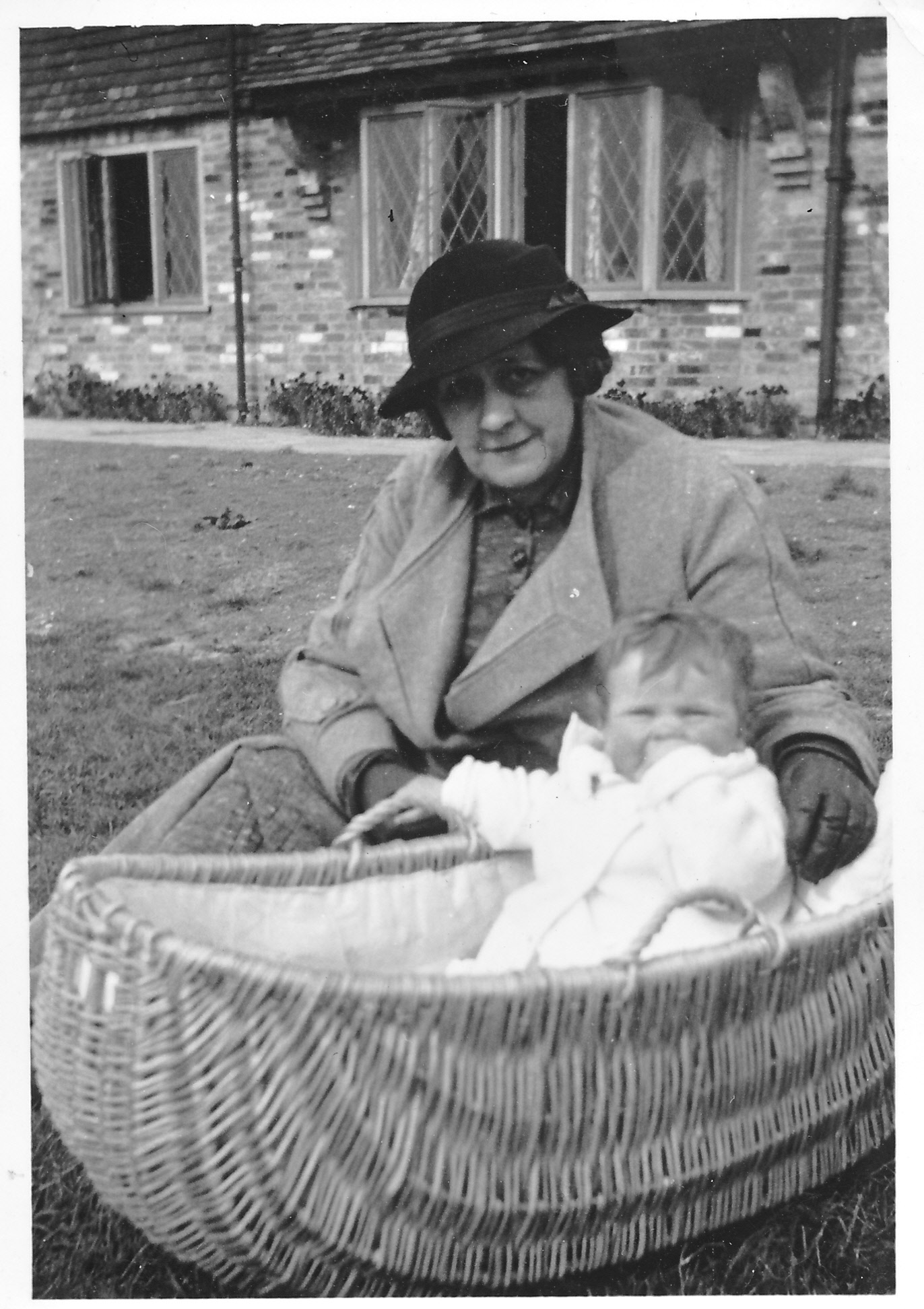
Helen Hanks with her niece c.1945

Only two years after her retirement, on 16 July 1949, she died in the hospital following a chronic and painful illness. A memorial service was held at the hospital on 21 July 1949, and later a library was created at the hospital, named The Helen Hanks Library.

Hanks is buried with her parents and three of her siblings in Plumstead Cemetery in south east London.

== Honours and awards ==
Hanks was awarded the Royal Red Cross medal, second class – ARRC, announced on 31 July 1919 in the 4th Supplement to the London Gazette.

== Life and legacy ==
Hanks never married. She dedicated her life to St. George's hospital where she was highly regarded for her work. Contemporary accounts suggest that whilst she was shy, she was a firm and an occasionally intimidating leader, whom nurses held in high regard. However, it is clear that she had great passion for her profession, caring deeply about nurses' training and development, offering them sage advice. She advised one recruit that she "must do everything for love, it must come from the heart".

Hanks was known for her occasional eccentricity, living in the hospital building with her two Pekingese dogs, which accompanied her to her office. She was a spiritual person having great faith, including a conviction that the hospital would be safe from bombing during WWII. She regarded Hyde Park as the hospital's garden and it was said that people would hold up the traffic for her to cross between the two.

Hanks became a nurse at the beginning of great transformation in the profession; from before WWI, through WWII and just up to the establishment of the National Health Service in 1948. As Matron, she would have led a large staff, supported nurses' recruitment, training and development laying down strategic direction, rules and procedures for the profession. Helen led modernisation and development of her profession, helping to making it fit for a new era under the NHS.
