= Mike Bewick =

British general practitioner

Dr Mike Bewick is deputy medical director of NHS England. He is deputy to Sir Bruce Keogh. He was formerly a general practitioner in Egremont, Cumbria.

He was formerly medical director for NHS Cumbria, at the time of the Cumbrian floods in 2009. According to Pulse, who rated him eighth in their list of the 50 most influential figures in general practice in 2014 he has retained his Northern frankness, declaring primary care commissioning ‘a mess’ and that NHS England was ‘almost burying head in the sand’ on the GP workforce crisis.

He says that NHS England would only close a GP practice if it was “at the extremes of immediate public safety”.

He launched a call to action consultation on general practice in 2013, warning that primary care cannot continue in its present form beneath the unsustainable weight of unprecedented social and economic pressures.

He has forecast that the GP partnership model will disappear in a ten years and primary care will be provided by organisations the size of Clinical Commissioning Groups.

He subsequently chaired an investigation into shortcomings in the cardiac unit at St George’s Hospital.
