= Theodore Gordon (British Army officer) =

Scottish inspector of army hospitals

Theodore Gordon (1786–1845), was a Scottish inspector of army hospitals.

== Life ==
Gordon was born in Aberdeenshire, and studied arts and medicine at King's College, Aberdeen, and at the University of Edinburgh, at which latter he graduated with an MA in 1802. In 1803, when eighteen years of age, he was appointed assistant-surgeon in the army, and soon after joined the 91st Highlanders, accompanying the regiment to Hanover in 1805. He saw service also in the Peninsula, and escaped shipwreck in the Douro (one of seven survivors) while in charge of invalids from Sir J. Moore's army. He was present at the battles of Rolica and Vimeiro.

He became surgeon to the 2nd battalion 89th regiment in 1809, and to the 4th regiment (King's Own) in 1811, with which he joined the Duke of Wellington in the Peninsula, was present at Salamanca, Vittoria, Badajoz, San Sebastian, and Burgos, and was promoted to the rank of staff-surgeon. Having been badly wounded in crossing the frontier into France, he was brought home and was invalided for a year. He resumed duty at Chelsea Hospital as staff-surgeon, had charge of a hospital at Brussels, after the Battle of Waterloo, and joined Wellington's staff in Paris, where he was promoted to be physician to the forces. After the peace he was chosen by Sir J. MacGrigor to be professional assistant at the medical board of the war office, and spent the remaining 30 years of his life in that administrative capacity. In 1836 he attained the rank of deputy-inspector-general of hospitals. He died in Brighton on 30 March 1845.

In 1822 he married Miss Barclay, niece of Major-general Sir Robert Barclay, K.C.B.
