= John Vetch =

Scottish army surgeon

John Vetch MD (1783–1835) was a Scottish army surgeon, now known for his early work on trachoma. The variant spelling Veitch of his surname was also used.

== Life ==
He was the eldest son of Robert Vetch of Caponflat, born in East Lothian; James Vetch and Hamilton Vetch were younger brothers. He graduated M.D. at the University of Edinburgh in 1804. He joined the army, in the position of hospital mate until he was commissioned in August 1806.

A depot hospital had been set up in 1801 at Selsey to treat British troops returning from the fighting in the French campaign in Egypt and Syria, with the condition called "Egyptian ophthalmia". The name was not a very good fit, but its scope in severe cases is recognised as modern medicine's trachoma. Stewart Duke-Elder considered that further pathogens were involved, Weeks Koch bacillus, and some mixture of gonococcus.

In 1804 Vetch observed in a battalion of the 52nd Foot at Hythe, Kent, an apparent outbreak of contagious ophthalmia, which over the course of a year spread through most of the soldiers. The unit had been joined by an intake of Irish militia volunteers. Vetch connected his observation of cases of eye disease with the proximity of the Irish militiamen with regiments that had served in Egypt and then returned to Ireland. Vetch built on the finding of Arthur Edmondston, that a high proportion of "Egyptian ophthalmia" infections might be passed by direct contact, and reasoned that the discharge from the infected eye was the only vector of the disease. Vetch was under George Peach, who had been surgeon to the 52nd Foot from 1803.

The 52nd Foot had a visit in May 1806 by Francis Knight, of the Army Medical Board, who was engaged in a large-scale rationalisation of army hospitals. He decided that the Selsey hospital should be devoted to ophthalmia cases. He also recommended initial treatment with extensive blood letting. Knight's zeal for closing hospitals was moderated by James McGrigor. Peach wrote to McGrigor about Knight's mode of treatment, which Vetch had adopted, in 1807. Vetch served as assistant surgeon in the 39th (Dorsetshire) Regiment of Foot for three months at the end of 1806. He worked on treating the ophthalmia patients, over 3,000 in the period 1806 to 1812.

In 1811 or 1812 Vetch was made Physician to the Forces. This position was later effectively renamed, as Assistant Inspector of Hospitals.

Vetch became embroiled in a priority dispute with William Adams, from about 1813. In the opinion of Gorin, the disputed treatment had been used in Ancient Greek medicine and Islamic medicine. Trachoma is a purulent infection. Traditional treatments included scraping off the inside of the eyelids, roughening by granuloma, and the use of an astringent. Vetch used scissors on the eyelids and silver nitrate as an escharotic. Adams used a knife rather than scissors, and copper sulphate. Vetch used blood letting, and Adams administered emetics. John Peter Grant asked in parliament in 1819 why Adams, who was not a military doctor, was being supported by public money to treat patients who were mainly soldiers. Adams was backed by Lord Palmerston.

Vetch was interred in the vault of the Charterhouse Chapel.

== Works ==
- An Account of the Ophthalmia which Has Appeared in England Since the Return of the British Army from Egypt, 1807
- Observations Relative to the Treatment by Sir William Adams, of the Ophthalmic Cases of the Army, 1818
- A letter to ... Viscount Palmerstone, ... on the subject of the Ophthalmic Institution, for the cure of Chelsea Pensioners, 1818
- A Practical Treatise on the Diseases of the Eye, 1820

== Family ==
Vetch married in 1812 Henrietta Maria Grant, daughter of Sir Alexander Grant, 7th Baronet.
