= Peter Millard =

British physician (1937–2018)

Peter Millard (1937–2018) FRCP was a British physician known for his work in geriatrics. He was an emeritus professor of geriatrics at St George's, University of London.

He served as president of the British Geriatrics Society from 1994 to 1996. In his 1992 doctoral thesis, he coined the name nosokinetics for the mathematical study of how patients flow through health care systems, and from 2004 to 2006 he edited a newsletter on the subject, the Nosokinetics News.

He died on 18 September 2018.
