= Two-stage drainage ditch =

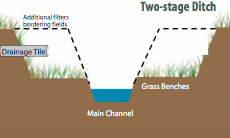
Cross Sectional Diagram of a Two Stage Drainage Ditch

A drainage ditch is a depression in the land created to channel water. Drainage ditches are typically formed around low-lying areas, roadsides or fields proximate to a water body or created to channel water from a more distant water source for the purpose of plant irrigation. The two stage drainage ditch is classified as a 'surface' sustainable drainage system, contrary to a sub-surface system. The two stage drainage ditch is a modification of the land whereby grass benches which serve as floodplains are formed within the land of the watershed of the water system, shown in the diagram to the right. By implementing benches either side of the water body, the energy of surface runoff dissipates, sustaining fluvial processes of the channel, thereby improving the water stability and water quality of existing channel.

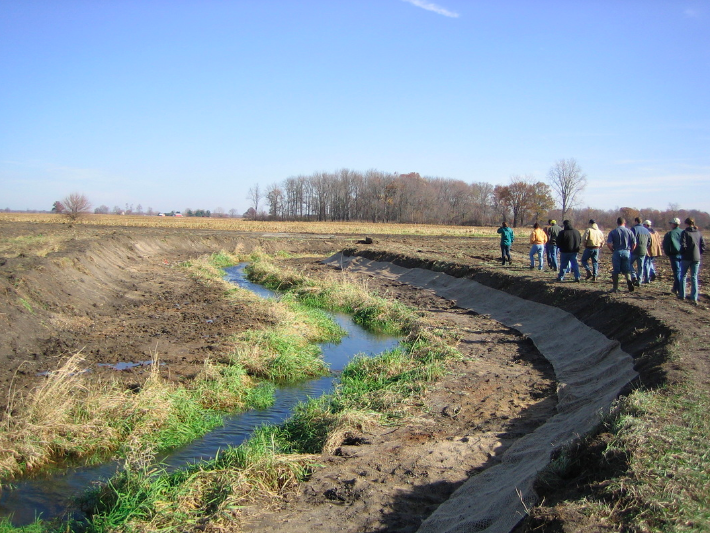
Photograph of a Two Stage Drainage Ditch as part of the Indiana Watershed Initiative

== The Environmental Issues ==
Inadequate drainage ditches and water management systems accelerate processes of water contamination, excessively desiccate soils during drought season and become a perpetuating financial burden to maintain if proactive drainage management systems are not properly exercised.

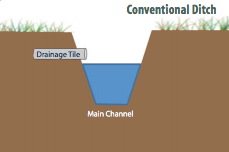
Cross Sectional Diagram of a 'Conventional' Drainage Ditch

Traditional drainage ditches and systems such as the 'Conventional Ditch' to the right have been beset by issues of perpetuating erosion and instability problems caused by an inability of the existing channel to manage large volumes of water discharge during peak flows. Consequently, this erosion of the surrounding land caused by surface runoff elicits in issues of deteriorating water quality and sedimentation, bank and channel widening, and the degradation of arable land proximate to the water body. Consequently, these issues exacerbate until the water channel becomes impassable and require extensive, costly maintenance.

However, sustainable ditch design implementation, for example, a properly created two stage drainage ditch can alleviate such issues in a self-maintaining manner with minimal impact to the natural geomorphological equilibrium of the wider ecosystem of the particular water body. Converse to traditional drainage ditches, the two stage drainage ditch is better equipped in managing the speed and filtration of nutrient flow and other contaminants from the surrounding land into the water body, thus, resolving such environmental issues (see below).

=== Benefits that resolve such Environmental Issues ===
In acknowledgement of such environmental issues, the primary purpose of the two stage drainage ditch is to more effectively transport sediment and other contaminants using natural fluvial processes of existing channels with minimal maintenance whilst allowing existent activities on the land proximate to the water body to continue such as farming, irrigation or roadworks. Thus, the overall benefit of the two stage drainage ditch is the stability of the water channel and wider ecosystem, reduced rates of discharge during high flows and reduced sediment entering the water system, aiding in alleviating much of the environmental issues suffered in existing water channels. Concurrently, the two stage drainage ditch requires little to no maintenance due to it being a natural geomorphological management strategy that does not upset the equilibrium that a conventional strategy such as entrenchment would cause. Furthermore, much of the vegetation, except for the land needed to implement the adjacent grass benches (see disadvantage analysis below) and the natural shape and meander of the water channel remains largely unaltered during the formation of the two stage drainage ditch, thus, protecting the system's ecology and substantially reduces ongoing maintenance costs, contrary to other drainage management systems.

==== Ecosystem Response - Reduced Eutrophication ====
Further, the two stage drainage ditch approach also improves water quality through nutrient assimilation by improving the interaction of sediment/soil and water on the adjacent benches above the water body that function similar to floodplains or wetlands. Consequently, sediment and other contaminants are lodged along these linear benches, limiting the leakage effect of such sediment from the surrounding watershed into the water channel itself.

In turn, the reduced level of contaminants (particularly from over-fertilised land) namely, nitrogen and phosphorus reduces the level of eutrophication taking place in the water. The limited level of eutrophication within the water decreases the level of algal blooms and growth of duckweed that create anoxic conditions in the water system. This elicits in a loss of biodiversity in aquatic life and hampering the agricultural functionality of the ditches.

== Advantages and Disadvantages of the Two Stage Drainage Ditch ==
Advantages	Disadvantages
=== Reduced Flooding, Soil Saturation, Erosion & Improved Growing Conditions === The two stage drainage ditch, with the introduction of the benches, creates a larger area on a cross-sectional basis than the existing, natural, trapezoidal channel. This is shown in the diagram below Consequently, this has the effect of a reduced propensity to flooding in adjacent upland areas of the watershed, and thus, less soil saturation that hampers soil quality and erosion and subsequent sedimentation into the water channel. The result of this is improved subsurface drainage performance and thus, growing conditions in the root zone Comparison of land requirements for the Existing Channel with the introduction of the Two Stage Drainage Ditch	=== Channel widening === ==== Upfront Cost ==== The primary disadvantage associated with the two stage drainage ditch is the upfront cost of the earthwork necessary to increase the existing channel for the benches to be constructed. Construction costs for such earthwork are contingent upon the watershed size and depth of the ditch and approximately range from $5–20 USD/linear foot. Whilst minimal loss of vegetation is encountered through the implementation of the two stage drainage ditch contrary to alternate measures, vegetation preventing such channel widening to take place to form the adjacent benches will be destructed. Furthermore, the result of widening the ditch will be effected at the ditch top. Thus, proximate arable land above the ditch will be surrendered. ==== Vegetation and Acreage Loss ==== Evidently, referring to the diagram on the left, the existent channel needs to be extended by an additional 13 ft of land to create the floodplains (benches) "Over a mile long reach [of the water channel] adds up to over 1.5 acre of land needed for the two stage drainage ditch design". This acreage of land may already be currently used for other purposes or contains infrastructure and subsurface gas or sewer lines. Thus, the larger the channel is, the more soil, and thus, increased funds required to move the vegetation. Ultimately, the constraints and associated costs of land loss necessary for ditch widening form a caveat. However, in order to maximise channel stability and ecological functionality to overcome the disadvantage, Ohio State University studies suggest "the total width of the benches plus the existing inset channel be 3-5 times the inset channel width that will form over time".
=== Lower Ongoing Costs === Whilst the upfront of two stage drainage ditch construction is expensive, the long term maintenance costs associated with the two stage drainage ditch are likely to be less than alternative management strategies and traditional ditch designs. This is because the benches built into the two stage drainage ditch create an inset channel that is largely self-flushing and has a more effective sediment transport capacity compared other ditch designs. Hence, the two stage ditch design will less likely fill up over time, resulting in a self-sustaining management system requiring less frequent maintenance than a management design such as entrenchment. Ultimately, the long term reduction in costs acts to neutralise the high upfront cost required to construct the two stage drainage ditch opposed to alternative ditch designs.	==== Higher Upfront Cost than Alternative Management Strategies ==== In acknowledgement of the above, the upfront costs associated with the formation of a two stage drainage ditch, particularly the benches adjacent to the water channel is likely higher than the cost incurred by more traditional maintenance approaches. Thus, since such initial investment is necessary, the landowner whom is implementing the two stage drainage ditch must do a cost-benefit analysis how the necessitation of the management system and the benefits of the project outweigh the associated costs. Scaled Diagram of the Two Stage Drainage Ditch

== Optimal Location ==
The optimal region to establish a two stage drainage ditch is where there are benches already naturally forming for binary reasons. Firstly, there is a supply of fine sediment available and accessible at the bottom of the channel, thus, eliminating the cost associated with excavating and moving sediment to artificially manufacture the benches in a watershed with minimal natural bench formation. Secondly, a significant part of the water flow entering the channel comes in the form of sub-surface drainage which contains very little sediment so this flow picks up sediment once inside the ditch with minimal natural bench formation. Thus, for reasons of sedimentation and cost-saving in the form of land excavation and sediment transportation, it is more beneficial to impose a two stage drainage ditch in a location where benches are already naturally forming.

== Case Study: South East Minnesota ==
=== The Minnesota Issue ===
The issue faced by Minnesota's channel management systems concerns the implementation of traditional ditch systems that were used to straighten what were once headwaters streams, disrupting the fluvial processes of the hydrological system. In fact, more than 25,000 miles of these traditional drainage ditch lines exist along agricultural fields in Minnesota, particularly in the South East in parts of the Upper Mississippi River. The Nature Conservancy's investigation into the Minnesota region affirmed the above limitations of traditional drainage management above,

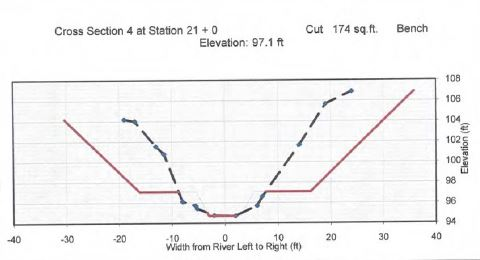
Cross Sectional Diagram of Adams Birr implemented in Minnesota

finding that these deep and wide conventional ditches are highly susceptible to erosion and sedimentation, hindering the stability of the ditch, finding excessive levels of nitrogen and phosphorus in streams which culminate in eutrophication, in addition to increased flooding. Biske affirmed Hansen's view that once such ditches are channelised and constructed, attempting to return the channels to their natural fluvial processes and meandering nature results in exacerbated erosion and sediment deposition.

=== The Solution: Two Stage Drainage Ditch ===
Therefore, to restore and alleviate issues of water quality, given agriculture is the largest income generator of Minnesota, the Nature Conservancy have begun to test a value analysis associated with the formation of two stage drainage systems in the region in the past decade. In 2010, a 7,000 linear feet two stage drainage ditch known as the 'Adams Birr' was implemented (see Figures to right).

From the daily results taken, testing for nitrate concentration in the channel, preliminary data demonstrated how, whilst there was insufficient data as at 2010 to report the full environmental benefits of the imposed two stage drainage ditch, there was a minimal reduction in daily nitrate levels intake, measured against the total daily precipitation intake. A longer time horizon of data would further demonstrate the positive impact the two stage drainage ditch has on nitrate levels in the channel during periods

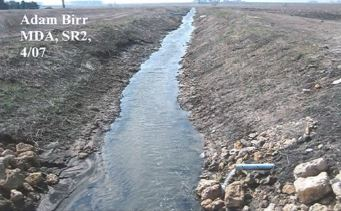
Photograph of Adams Birr in Minnesota

of precipitation.

Ultimately, as at the time the report was published, it was too soon to represent the nutrient attenuation benefits of the program. However, initial visual observations demonstrated habitat improvements and aquatic life improvements from the initial results of the nitrate reduction were already beginning to take place, as the process of eutrophication in the water channel began to slow.
