= James Stevenson Barnes =

British Army officer

Colonel James Stevenson Barnes CB
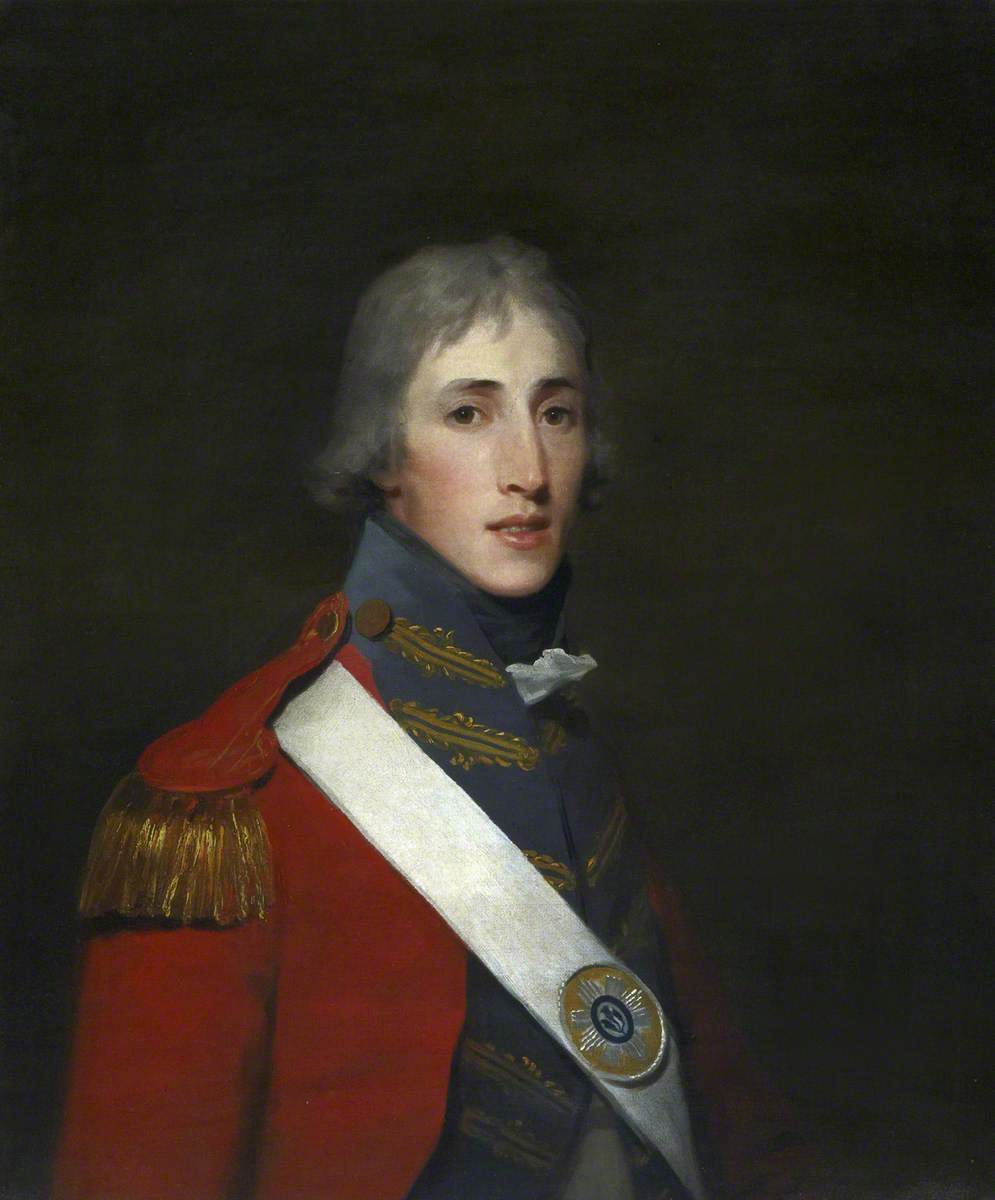
- Portrait by Henry Raeburn
- Born: 1756
- Died: 1823 (aged 66–67)
- Military career
- Allegiance: Kingdom of Great Britain (1792–1800); United Kingdom
- Branch: British Army
- Service years: 1792–1815
- Rank: Colonel
- Unit: 1st (Royal) Regiment of Foot
- Commands: 5th Division
- Conflicts: Napoleonic Wars
- Awards: Companion of the Order of the Bath

Colonel James Stevenson Barnes CB (1756–1823) was a British Army officer who saw action in the Napoleonic Wars.

== Military career ==
Barnes was commissioned as an ensign in the 2nd Battalion, 1st (Royal) Regiment of Foot on 11 July 1792. He saw action at the Siege of Toulon in autumn 1793 and at the Siege of Calvi in summer 1794, before taking part in the Anglo-Russian invasion of Holland, under the command of Lieutenant-General Sir Ralph Abercromby, in autumn 1799. He saw action again as part in the Ferrol Expedition, under the command of General Sir James Pulteney, in August 1800 and then took part in the Siege of Alexandria in August 1801. He then served in the West Indies from 1803 to 1805.

Promoted to lieutenant-colonel on 6 November 1806, Barnes was deployed to Spain for service in the Peninsular War. He was briefly acting commander of the 5th Division in its formative months between 4 August 1810 and 30 September 1810. He commanded a brigade at the Battle of Bussaco in September 1810.

Barnes was wounded at the Battle of Salamanca in July 1812 and saw action at the Battle of the Nive in December 1813 and at the Siege of San Sebastián in July 1813. A few weeks later, shortly after the Battle of Sorauren, he launched an attack on French positions which the Duke of Wellington described as "the best and boldest he had ever seen in his life." He was promoted to full colonel on 4 June 1814.
