= Stafford Lightburne =

British Army officer

Lieutenant-General Stafford Lightburne
- Born: Ireland
- Died: 27 September 1827; London, England
- Other name: Strafford Lightburn
- Military career
- Allegiance: United Kingdom
- Branch: British Army
- Service years: 1775–1827
- Rank: Lieutenant-General
- Unit: 37th Regiment of Foot
- Commands: Royal Dublin Regiment of Foot; 53rd Regiment of Foot; Fort Morne Fortune; Brigade, 4th Division; Brigade, 3rd Division
- Conflicts: American Revolutionary War; Battle of Long Island; Battle of Brandywine; Battle of Germantown; Battle of Stony Point; Siege of Charleston; Siege of Yorktown (WIA); French Revolutionary Wars; Flanders campaign; Siege of Valenciennes; Siege of Dunkirk; Battle of Tournay; West Indies campaign; Invasion of St Lucia; St Vincent insurgency; Invasion of Trinidad; Battle of San Juan; Napoleonic Wars; Peninsular War; Battle of Busaco

Lieutenant-General Stafford Lightburne (died 27 September 1827) was an Anglo-Irish British Army officer who served in the American and French Revolutionary Wars, before becoming a general officer during the Napoleonic Wars. Lightburne was mentioned in dispatches by Prince Frederick, Duke of York and Albany for his service at the Battle of Tournay in 1794, before commanding the 53rd Regiment of Foot in the West Indies. After serving as a staff officer in Ireland, Lightburne was given command of a brigade in the Peninsular War in 1809, during which year he was present at the Battle of Busaco. He was subsequently dismissed from his position in ignominious but obscure circumstances by Lieutenant-General Lord Wellington in 1810. Lightburne received no further employment in the army after this, but was promoted to lieutenant-general in 1813. Little is known about his personal life.

== Early life and family ==
Stafford Lightburne was probably born in Ireland; his date of birth is not known. He was the son of John Lightburne, Mayor of Wexford, and Mary Hatton née Tench. Lightburne's forename has alternatively been spelt Strafford, and his surname Lightburn. Little is recorded of his personal life; it is not known whether Lightburne ever married but at least one source records Mary Hatton as his wife rather than his mother.

== Military service ==
=== Early career ===
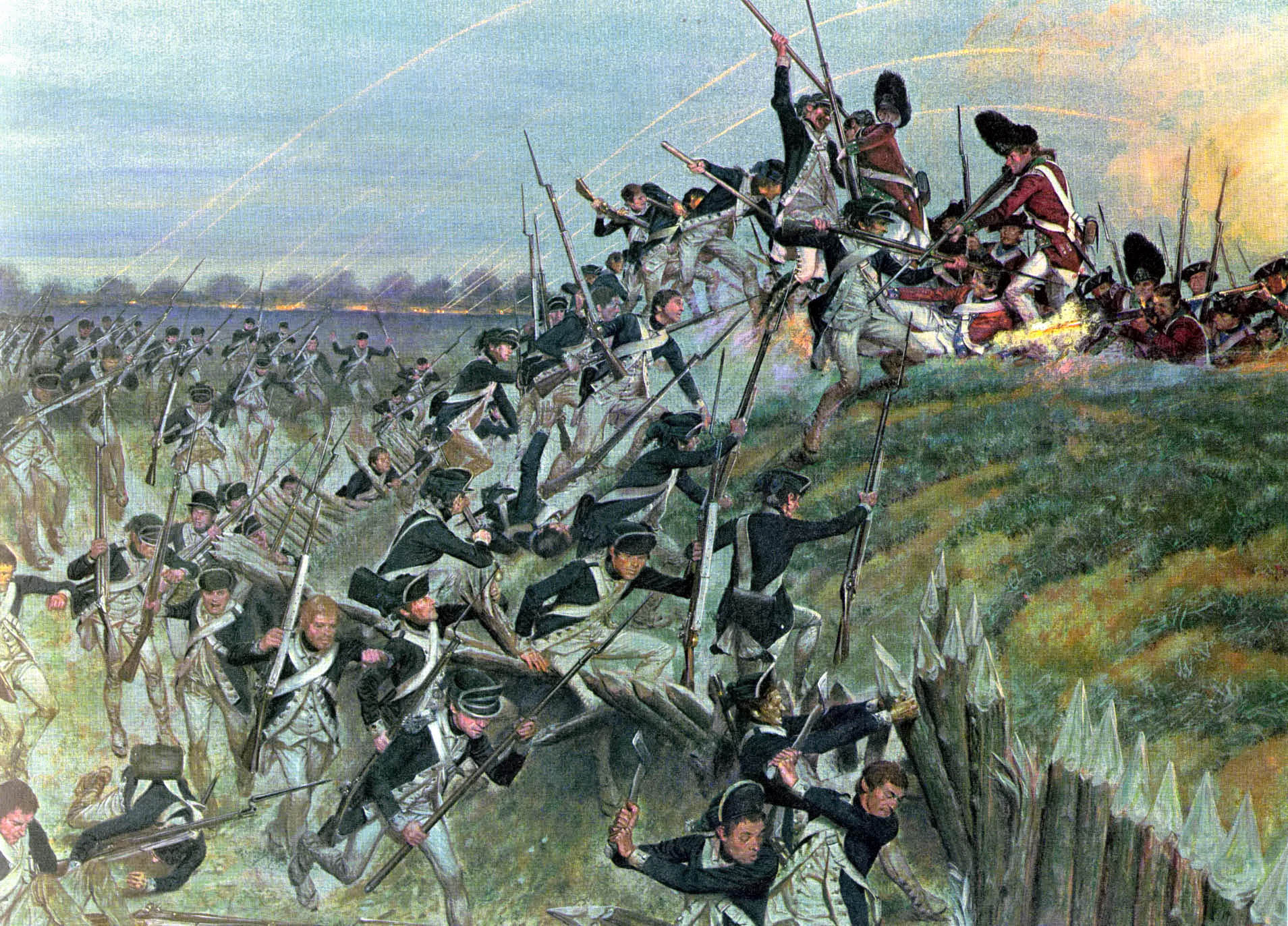
The siege of Yorktown, at which Lightburne was wounded

Lightburne joined the British Army as an ensign in the 37th Regiment of Foot on 15 August 1775. With the American Revolutionary War ongoing, in 1776 Lightburne travelled with his regiment to serve in North America. He fought at the Battle of Long Island on 26 August the same year. Lightburne and the 37th subsequently saw action at the Battle of Brandywine on 11 September 1777 and the Battle of Germantown on 4 October. He was subsequently promoted to lieutenant on 10 February the following year.

Lightburne continued to serve with the 37th in North America after his promotion, fighting at the Battle of Stony Point on 16 July 1779 and the Siege of Charleston between March and May the following year. Lightburne was then present at the Siege of Yorktown between September and October 1781, during which he was wounded. He surrendered with the rest of the British Army and gave his parole, returning to England.

The American Revolutionary War ended in 1783 and Lightburne returned to North America to continue serving with the 37th, stationed in Newfoundland and Nova Scotia. While there he was promoted to captain-lieutenant on 18 October 1787, being given command of a company within the regiment. Lightburne remained in North America until the 37th returned to England in 1789.

=== French Revolutionary Wars ===
Lightburne served in England until the French Revolutionary Wars began. In March 1793 his regiment was sent to serve in the Flanders campaign, and later in the same year Lightburne fought at the sieges of Valenciennes and Dunkirk, before on 22 May 1794 he saw action at the Battle of Tournay. Lightburne participated in intense fighting around a village known as Pond de Chien, in which he distinguished himself, being one of three officers mentioned in dispatches by Prince Frederick, Duke of York and Albany. On the day of the battle Lightburne was court martialled for "misbehaviour before the enemy" but acquitted, with York censuring the soldier who accused Lightburne. He was promoted to major on 22 August the same year, joining the 119th Regiment of Foot which was based in Ireland.

Lightburne stayed with the 119th only very briefly, being promoted to lieutenant-colonel in the Royal Dublin Regiment of Foot on 3 December. The regiment was disbanded in early 1795 and in September Lightburne was transferred to the 53rd Regiment of Foot, based in Southampton. He sailed with his new regiment to the West Indies in November, joining the West Indies campaign. Lightburne subsequently fought in the Invasion of St Lucia in May the following year, after which the 53rd moved to St Vincent where for the rest of the year Lightburne fought insurgents in the Second Carib War.

The 53rd moved in February 1797 from St Vincent to participate in the Invasion of Trinidad on 21 February, and then in April Lightburne was also present at the unsuccessful Battle of San Juan, an expedition to Puerto Rico. In the following year Lightburne was forced to leave the West Indies because his health was declining, but he returned in 1799 to serve as the commandant of Fort Morne Fortune on St Lucia. Promoted to brevet colonel on 1 January 1801, Lightburne returned to England with the 53rd in Autumn 1802.

=== Napoleonic Wars ===
Lightburne's regiment was sent to encamp in Suffolk upon its return; in the following year the Napoleonic Wars began, with Lightburne still in Suffolk. In 1804 he went to serve again in Ireland, where in 1805 he was appointed a brigadier-general to serve as a staff officer for the Eastern Military District. He continued to serve as such in Ireland until 25 April 1808 when he was promoted to major-general. Lightburne remained in Ireland as a general officer until 9 June the following year, when he was given orders to sail out to the Iberian Peninsula with reinforcements for the Peninsular War. He disembarked at Lisbon on 4 July, while the army under Lieutenant-General Sir Arthur Wellesley was fighting in Spain. On 9 July Lightburne was ordered to keep the regiments under his command in Lisbon and train them in preparation for joining Wellesley's army.

Lightburne, still holding his command, which was now deemed a brigade, independently of the main army, was placed under the command of Marshal William Beresford on 17 July. It contained the second battalions of the 5th and 83rd Regiments of Foot and three companies of the fifth battalion of the 60th Regiment of Foot. Lightburne was not officially appointed to the staff of Wellesley's army until 21 August, backdated to 26 July. It was towards the start of August that Lightburne left Lisbon with his brigade, travelling to Beresford's encampment at Castello Branco. Wellesley directed Beresford on 26 August that he could keep Lightburne's brigade with him if he wished, or the formation could instead be sent to serve at Abrantes. By September Lightburne had arrived at Abrantes, soon afterwards being temporarily replaced in command of his brigade because of an unknown indisposition.

Lightburne and his brigade returned to Wellesley's army in January 1810, initially being assigned to the 4th Division before after several weeks moving to the 3rd Division under the command of Major-General Thomas Picton. Lightburne's brigade was then posted at Celorico de Basto in support of the Light Division which was guarding the northern Portuguese border. In July this duty was interrupted when the French invaded Portugal and began the Siege of Almeida.

==== Dismissal ====
As the British prepared to combat the French attack, Wellesley, now Viscount Wellington, made a sudden request on 29 August to Horse Guards that Lightburne be recalled from his army. He wrote to the Military Secretary, Lieutenant-Colonel Henry Torrens, that:

...there is General Lightburne, whose conduct is really scandalous. I am not able to bring him before a court-martial as I should wish, but he is a disgrace to the army which can have such a man as a Major General...I pray God and the Horse Guards to deliver me from General Lightburne...

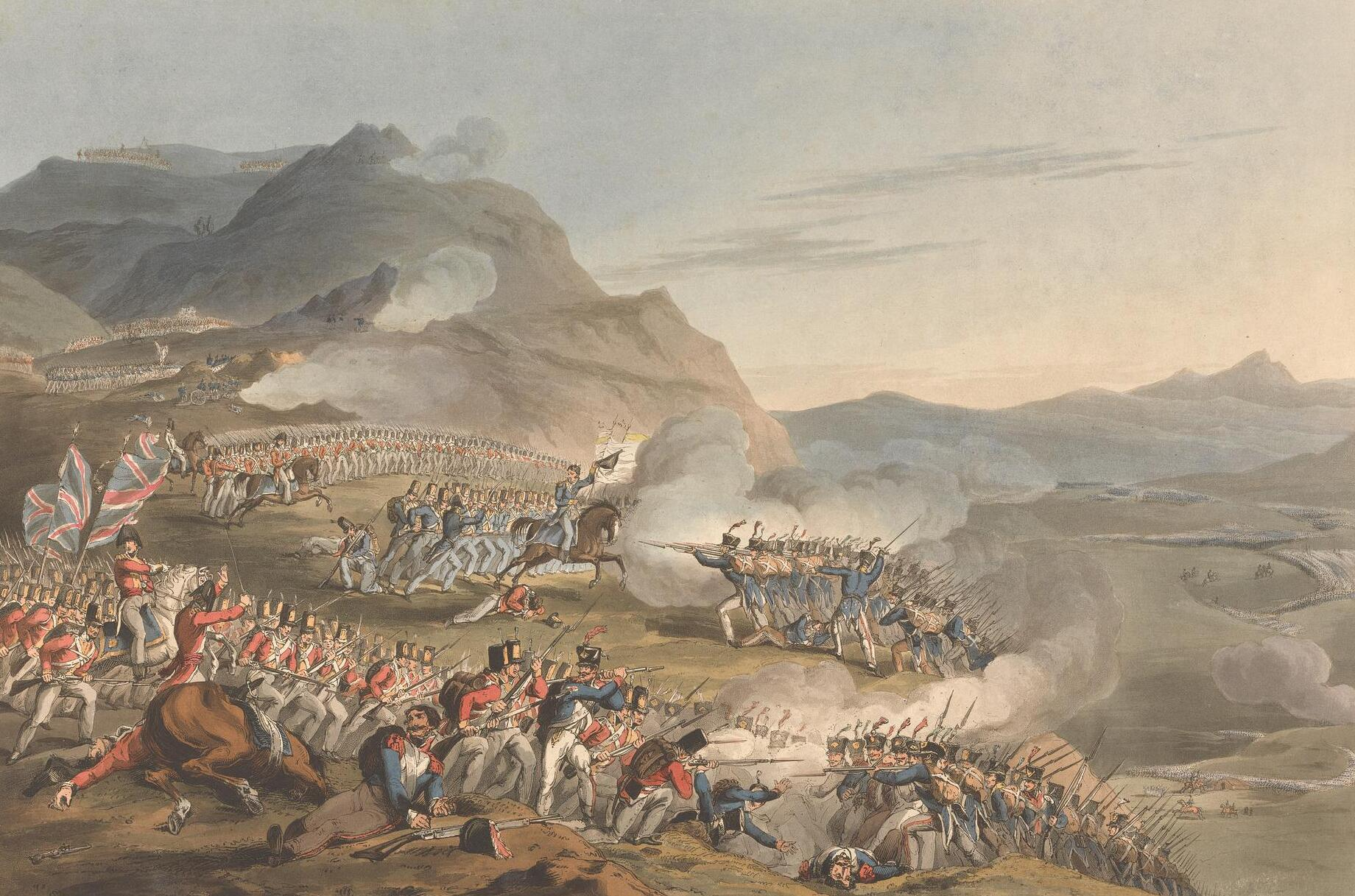
The Battle of Busaco, at which Lightburne commanded a brigade but was not called into combat

Wellington's wishes were not immediately complied with, and when the French began marching towards Lisbon on 15 September Lightburne was still with his brigade, commanding it during the British retreat. Lightburne was subsequently present at the Battle of Busaco on 27 September, but his brigade did not participate in much of the combat. It briefly encountered and was engaged by some French skirmishers, but otherwise spent the battle at order arms. After the battle rumours spread through Wellington's army that Lightburne had been drunk at Busaco, and Picton had refused to allow him to take his men into battle. Unlike other senior officers at the battle, Lightburne never received the Army Gold Medal for it.

Soon after Busaco Wellington received a reply from Torrens, confirming that Lightburne would be removed from the Iberian Peninsula:

...I have known his Character for several years, not only from report but from my own personal Experience of his unworthiness, I cannot but rejoice that you are relieved of such a burden!

Torrens went on to explain that General Sir David Dundas, the Commander-in-Chief of the Forces, was going to explain the situation to Lightburne. Dundas was to tell him that he would never be recommended for promotion or employment again, and suggest that he retire from the army entirely. The particular motive for Lightburne's punishment was never explicitly mentioned, however Wellington wrote again to Torrens on 4 October, by which time Picton as well had started to request Lightburne's removal, elucidating that:

...he has been guilty of many little improprieties which render him a discreditable person with the army...I should prefer avoiding to employ him and give no reason...

The military historians Ron McGuigan and Robert Burnham suggest that the reason for Lightburne's dismissal may have been alcoholism, as he had demonstrated at Busaco. The historian Michael Glover notes that Wellington was "scrupulously fair" with his generals, and would not push for the removal of poor but well-intentioned officers. Glover compares this mindset with Wellington's vehement demand for Lightburne's dismissal, calling him a rogue rather than just an incompetent. Lightburne was officially relieved of command of his brigade on 6 October and sent back to England via Lisbon. He was replaced by Brigadier-General James Dunlop of Dunlop. His dismissal was kept quiet outside of the army, and he was promoted to lieutenant-general by seniority on 4 June 1813, but never given another command. He died in London on 27 September 1827. As Lightburne never did resign from the army, McGuigan and Burnham suggest that if he had lived longer he would have eventually been promoted to general despite his lack of employment.
