= Muriel Powell =

British nurse, hospital matron, nurse educator and public servant

Dame Muriel Powell DBE
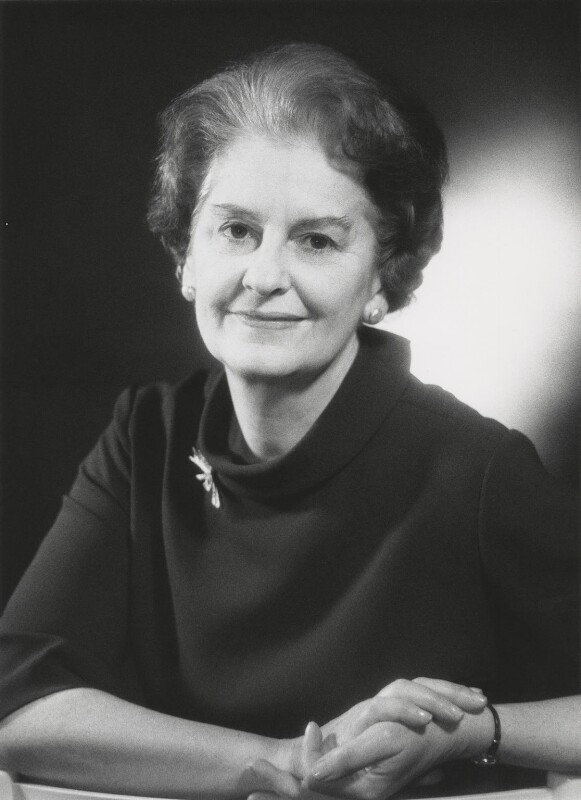
- Photograph by Godfrey Argent, 1969, in the National Portrait Gallery
- Born: Muriel Betty Powell; 30 October 1914; Ruspidge, Gloucestershire, England
- Died: 8 December 1978 (aged 64); Cinderford, Gloucestershire, England
- Occupations: Nurse, public servant

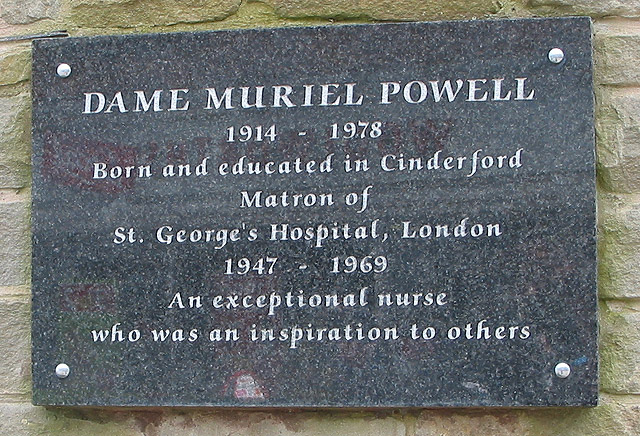
Plaque on the clock tower, Cinderford, Gloucestershire

Dame Muriel Betty Powell DBE (30 October 1914 – 8 December 1978) was a British nurse, hospital matron, nurse educator, public servant, and Chief Nursing Officer (CNO) for the Scottish Home and Health Department (SHHD) 1970-76.

== Early life ==
Powell was born, lived and was educated in Cinderford, Forest of Dean, Gloucestershire. She was the fourth of seven children of Annie (nee Stewart) and Wallace George Powell, a stonemason who set up a house building company. The family were committed members of the local Anglican church, where the vicar had previously been a chaplain at London at the Middlesex Hospital and St. George's Hospital, when it was at Hyde Park Corner. Powell had decided to train as a nurse with a view to becoming a missionary in Africa and applied to St. George's Hospital, Hyde Park Corner, London on the advice of her vicar, the Reverend Gliddon.

== Early nursing career ==
Powell entered trained at St. George's Hospital, London in 1934 and qualified as a State Registered Nurse in 1936. She then undertook midwifery training at St. George's Hospital, London and in Gloucestershire, attaining her Registered Midwife qualification from the Central Midwives Board in mid-1939. She first worked at the emergency maternity hospital at Potslip Hall, Gloucestershire and, on its closure, as a district nurse/midwife for a short time. Returning to London in 1940 she gained her Nurse Tutor Certificate from Battersea College of Technology(1941) and Diploma in Nursing from University of London(1942). Powell was appointed sister tutor at Ipswich Borough General Hospital in 1943 and principal tutor at Manchester Royal Infirmary in1946. She joined the Royal College of Nursing in 1934.

== Later nursing career ==
In 1947, aged 32, Powell became matron at St George's Hospital, London, succeeding Helen Hanks after her retirement. Her age reportedly "raised eyebrows" among the medical establishment, which deemed her too young for the position, but she proved her critics wrong and would remain there for 22 years. Powell was part of the government committee that published the Salmon Report on Hospital Nursing, that recommended removal of the title "matron" from the National Health Service in 1968. The title has since been gradually reintroduced to the NHS lexicon.

From 1958-1962 Powell was President of the Association of Hospital Matrons. From 1963-1964 she became Deputy President of the Royal College of Nursing 1963-1964. And in 1965-1967 she was President of the National Association of State Enrolled Nurses.

She was appointed Chief Nursing Officer in Scotland in 1970. However, it soon became clear that she suffered from dementia, and retired in 1976. She returned to Gloucestershire, where she died in a psychiatric hospital in 1978, aged 64.

== Honours and awards ==
Powell was appointed Commander of the Order of the British Empire (CBE) in 1962 and Dame Commander of the Order of the British Empire (DBE) in 1968 for her services to nursing, and specifically her membership of the Salmon Committee and including her tenure as matron of St George's Hospital, London.

== Legacy ==
The St George's Nurses League presents the Dame Muriel Powell Award to those who have made important contributions in the field of nursing.

== Sources ==
- Thurgood, G. "Muriel Powell Remembered. A Profile of her Life", Journal of Nursing Management (July 2001)
- Scott, EJ (February 2003). "Dame Muriel Powell (1914-1978): role model of a hospital matron and leader of nursing". J Med Biogr. 11: 3–9. doi:10.1177/096777200301100104. PMID 12522493.
