= Nosokinetics =

Nosokinetics is the science/subject of measuring and modelling the process of care in health and social care systems. Nosokinetics brings together the Greek words for noso: disease and kinetics: movement.

Black box models are currently used to plan changes in health and social care systems. These input-output models overlook the process of inpatient care, as a result suboptimal decisions are made. Nosokinetics, (analogous to Pharmacokinetics), seeks to develop dynamic methods which measure and model the process of inpatient care. The aim is to develop a scientific base to underpin the planning of sustainable health and social care systems.

== Establishment ==
Nosokinetics is a new science that was established in the UK in the early 1990s by Prof Peter H Millard after publishing his PhD thesis. In 2004 Nosokinetics group newsletter was established.

== Origin ==
Prof Peter H Millard writes about Nosokinetics : "If the random forces of wind and tide can make such a beautiful statue (referring to an iceberg), how much better could mankind do if a new science was developed which explains the complex processes of health and social care. Until new methods of planning health and social care services to meet the needs of an ageing population are introduced, service delivery will stumble on from crisis to crisis. The world population is ageing and sustainable systems of health care need to be developed."

He has established the nosokinetics group of interested researchers. The group collaborates to organize conferences and disseminates news of nosokinetics and other researchers' research and practical use of modelling to enhance decision making in health and social care systems.

== Network ==
The Nosokinetics Group has succeeded in attracting a lot of researchers. Nosokinetics interested people are present in many countries including Australia, UK & Egypt. They are from different disciplines ranging from health care providers to management scientists. The news related to nosokinetics is shared to the network through the bimonthly newsletter Nosokinetics News which helps to communicate papers, conferences and events of interest to the Nosokinetics network.

== See also ==
- Health administration
- Association of University Programs in Health Administration
