= Robert Barclay (British Army officer) =

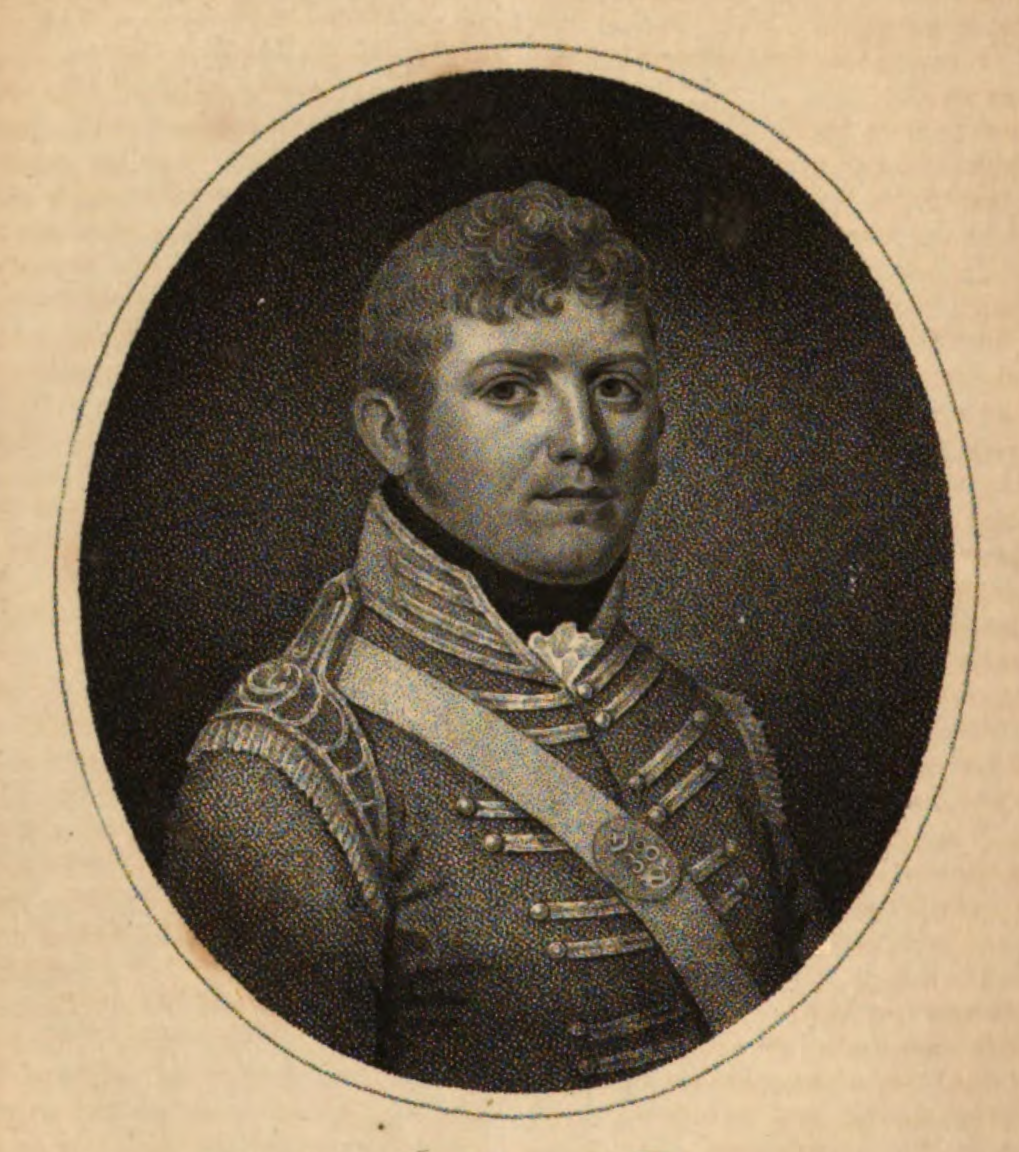
- Born: 1774
- Died: 11 May 1811 (aged 36–37)
- Occupation: Military personnel
- Awards: Mentioned in dispatches
- Branch: British Army

Lieutenant-Colonel Robert Barclay (1774 – 11 May 1811) was a British Army officer who served in the French Revolutionary and Napoleonic Wars.

Barclay was commissioned into the British Army as an ensign in the 38th Regiment of Foot on 28 October 1789. He subsequently embarked with his regiment for the East Indies, distinguishing himself in most of the actions fought there in 1793. Barclay he was promoted to lieutenant on 31 May 1793 and captain on 8 April 1795, on both occasions out of his turn. Having been taken prisoner by enemy forces, he suffered much in captivity, and in the year following his promotion Barclay returned to England. Though entitled to six months' leave, he hastened to rejoin his regiment, then stationed in the West Indies.

His distinguished qualities having become known to Lieutenant-General Sir John Moore, he was promoted to major in the 52nd Regiment of Foot on 17 September 1803, and on 29 May 1806 to lieutenant-colonel. In 1808, Barclay accompanied Moore in an expedition to Sweden, and afterwards went to Portugal. He was mentioned in despatches for his distinguished conduct during the Battle of the Côa on 24 June 1810. Barclay subsequently commanded a brigade, at the head of which, when charging French troops at the Battle of Bussaco, he received a wound below the left knee. For his conduct at Bussaco he was again honourably mentioned in despatches. His wound obliged him to leave the British army, and he died from the effects of it on 11 May 1811.
