= Michael Glover (historian) =

British military historian (1922–1990)

Michael Glover (1922–1990) served in the British army during the Second World War, after which he joined the British Council and became a professional author. He has written many articles and books on Napoleonic and Victorian warfare.

== Published works ==
Glover has written the following published works:

- Britannia Sickens: Sir Arthur Wellesley and the Convention of Cintra, London: Leo Cooper, 1970.
- Legacy of Glory. The Bonaparte Kingdom of Spain, 1808-1813, London: Leo Cooper, 1972.
- Wellington as Military Commander, London: Sphere Books, 1973.
- The Peninsular War, 1807-1814: A Concise Military History, London: David & Charles; Hamden, Conn.: Archon Books, 1974.
- Rorke's Drift: A Victorian Epic, London: Cooper, 1975.
- General Burgoyne in Canada and America: Scapegoat for a System, London: Gordon & Cremonesi; [New York: Atheneum Publishers], 1976.
- A Very Slippery Fellow: The Life of Sir Robert Wilson 1777-1849, Oxford: OUP, 1978.
- The Napoleonic Wars: An Illustrated History, 1792-1815, London: Batsford, 1979.
- Warfare in the Age of Bonaparte, London: Cassell, c. 1980.
- The Fight for the Channel Ports: Calais to Brest 1940: A Study in Confusion, London: Leo Cooper, 1985.

Glover contributed additional text to the following published work:

- Pericoli, Ugo, 1815 - The Armies at Waterloo, additional text by Michael Glover; translations from the Italian by A. S. W. Winkworth; introduction by Elizabeth Longford, London: Seeley, 1973.
