= James Borland (surgeon) =

Scottish inspector-general of army hospitals

- Born: April 1774; Ayr, Scotland
- Died: 22 February 1863 (aged 88); Teddington

James Borland (April 1774 – 22 February 1863) was a Scottish inspector-general of army hospitals.

== Biography ==
Borland was born at Ayr, Scotland, in April 1774, and entered the army medical department as surgeon's mate in the 42nd Highlanders in 1792. Having been promoted to the staff next year, he made two campaigns under the Duke of York in Flanders, after which he proceeded to the West Indies as surgeon, 23rd royal Welsh Fusiliers. He was then again transferred to the staff, and did duty in St. Domingo from 1796 until the last remnant of the British army was withdrawn from that pestilential shore in 1798. In 1799 he accompanied the expedition to the Helder, and after its failure was sent by the Duke of York to the headquarters of the French general, Guillaume Brune, with a flag of truce, to arrange for the exchange of the wounded. For this service he was promoted to the then newly constituted rank of deputy inspector of army hospitals.

He was also attached to the Russian troops, which had co-operated with the British in North Holland, and had been ordered to winter in the Channel Islands until the breaking up of the ice in the Baltic should allow of their return home. For this service, rendered more onerous by an outbreak of malignant fever in Guernsey, he received the thanks of the czar, accompanied by an invitation to of the imperial service in the highest rank, which he declined. Borland was chief medical officer of the army in the southern counties, under command of Sir David Dundas, at the time of the threatened French invasion. Having attained the rank of inspector-general of hospitals in 1807, he was employed at head-quarters in London for some time, at a period when many improvements in army hospital organisation were essayed.

During the unfortunate expedition to the Scheldt, he volunteered for the duty of inquiring into the causes of the terrible sickness and mortality then prevalent at Walcheren. In this service he was associated with Dr. Lempriere, one of the physicians to the army, and Sir Gilbert Blane, who had then left the navy and was in practice in London. The report of these commissioners at whose recommendation the troops were finally withdrawn, was ordered by the House of Commons to be printed among 'Accounts and Papers for 1810.' Its description is Papers relating to the Scheldt Expedition,' fol. 2, No. 104. From 1810 to 1810 Borland was principal medical officer in the Mediterranean, during which period he organised the hospitals of the Anglo-Sicilian contingent, the efficiency and unprecedented economy of which formed the subject of a special official minute on the breaking up of the force. His services during the outbreak of plague at Malta received the highest praise from Admiral Lord Exmouth.

He also accompanied the force sent to assist the Austrians in expelling Joachim Murat from Naples, and the troops under Major-general Sir Robert Henry MacFarlane, despatched from Genoa, which held Marseilles and blockaded Toulon at the time of the Waterloo campaign. Borland retired on half-pay in 1810. He was appointed honorary physician to H.R.H. the Duke of Kent, and also received the order of St. Maurice and 8t. Lazare of Savoy. For many years he was resident at Teddington, Middlesex, where his sterling character and many kindly deeds wou for him general esteem. He died at Teddington on 22 February 1863, at the age of eighty-nine years.
