= Hewett (surname) =

Hewett is a surname. Notable people with the surname include:

- Adrian Paul Hewett (born 1959), British actor, director, and philanthropist
- Alfie Hewett (born 1997), British wheelchair tennis player
- Ben Hewett (born 1978), Australian actor and television presenter
- Charles Thomas Hewett, South Australian explorer and politician
- Christopher Hewett (1921–2001), British actor and theatre director
- Colleen Hewett (born 1950), Australian actress and singer
- Cornwallis Hewett (1787–1841), Royal Physician and Downing Professor of Medicine
- Dave Hewett (born 1971), New Zealand rugby union player
- Donnel Foster Hewett (1881–1971), American geologist and mineralogist
- Dorothy Hewett (1923–2002), Australian poet, novelist and playwright
- Edgar Lee Hewett (1865–1946), American archaeologist and anthropologist
- George Hewett (British Army officer) (1750 - 1840), British army general
- Rear Admiral George Hayley Hewett (1855–1930), Royal Navy Admiral
- Herbie Hewett (1864–1921), English cricketer
- Howard Hewett (born 1955), American singer
- Ivan Hewett, British music journalist
- Rev. John Hewett (1830–1911), British priest
- Sir John Prescott Hewett (1854–1941), British Member of Parliament and Colonial administrator
- Rev. John Short Hewett (1781–1835), British academic and priest
- Lauren Hewett (born 1981), Australian actress
- Paul Hewett (1956-2026), British astronomer, professor of Observational Cosmology and Astrophysics at the Institute of Astronomy, Cambridge
- Sir Prescott Gardner Hewett, 1st Baronet (1812–1891), Royal Physician
- William Nathan Wrighte Hewett (1834–1888), English Royal Navy admiral and Victoria Cross recipient

== See also ==
- Hewitt (name)
