= Cornwallis Hewett =

Cornwallis Hewett M.D., F.R.C.P.
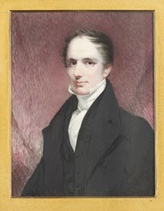
- Portrait of Dr. Cornwallis Hewett by John Hargreaves
- Born: 1787
- Died: 1841 (aged 53–54)
- Occupation: physician
- Title: Dr.

1. Cornwallis Hewett FRSC (1787 – 13 September 1841) was a physician who served as Downing Professor of Medicine and Physician-Extraordinary to the King. His younger half-brother Prescott Gardner Hewett also served as Physician-Extraordinary as well as Serjeant Surgeon.

== Early life ==
Hewett was born in the East Indies in 1787 to William Nathan Wright Hewett of Calcutta and Bilham House, Doncaster. His father was initially a very wealthy man who lost his fortune from his love of horse-racing. Even though his father's change in fortune meant that he had to remove to France, he still managed to have a strong education at Charterhouse School followed by matriculation at Trinity College, Cambridge in 1806, and received his Bachelor of Arts degree in 1809 with a Members' Prize. He later transferred to Downing College, Cambridge and graduated with a Master of Arts degree in 1812, his medical license in 1814, along with a further Bachelor of Medicine from Downing College, Cambridge as well as an incorporated Bachelor of Medicine from Brasenose College, Oxford.

== Medical career ==
After receiving his M.L. Hewett was appointed Downing Professor of Medicine, one of the most senior medical appointments in the gift of the University of Cambridge. Hewett was also appointed a Fellow and Tutor at Downing College, Cambridge in 1814 and later he received his Doctorate of Medicine in 1822. On receiving his M.D. on 9 August 1822 he was also appointed as a Member of the Royal College of Physicians, becoming a fellow on 12 April 1824. On 25 March 1825 he was appointed the physician to St George's Hospital, London a position in which he served until 1833. He was also appointed Physician-Extraordinary to the King, William IV on 20 July 1832, although no works were published under his name during that appointment. His distinguished career although outdone by his younger half-brother Prescott Gardner Hewett did inspire him to also join St George's Hospital in his wake.

== Personal life ==
Hewett lived at Berkeley Street, St George Hanover Square, Middlesex. He died at Brighton on 13 September 1841.

As well as being brother to Rev. John Short Hewett and Sir Prescott Gardner Hewett, Bt., he was also uncle of Rev. John Hewett and Vice-Admiral William Hewett, great uncle of John Prescott Hewett and of Rear Admiral George Hayley Hewett.
