= Peter Wallwork Latham =

English physician and professor of medicine

- Born: 21 October 1832; Wigan, Lancashire
- Died: 29 October 1923 (aged 91); Clifton, Bristol
- Occupation: Physician

Peter Wallwork Latham FRCP (1832–1923) was an English physician and professor of medicine at the University of Cambridge.

== Biography ==
Peter Latham served as an apprentice to this father, who was a physician, and then studied at the University of Glasgow, before he matriculated in 1854 at Caius College, Cambridge. He graduated there BA in 1858. After studying medicine at St Bartholomew's Hospital and in Germany, he was elected in 1860 a Fellow of Downing College, Cambridge. in 1861 he graduated MA and MB from the University of Cambridge and qualified MRCP. In April 1862 he was appointed assistant physician to the Westminster Hospital, but in 1863 he returned to Cambridge as physician to Addenbrooke's Hospital and lecturer at Downing College. He graduated in 1864 with the higher MD degree from the University of Cambridge. He was elected FRCP in 1866.

Latham was the Downing Professor of Medicine from 1874 to 1894, after serving from 1868 to 1874 as deputy to his predecessor William Webster Fisher. (Latham's successor was John Buckley Bradbury.)

Apart from conducting a large consulting practice, Latham did much, in association with George Humphry and Michael Foster, to increase the efficiency and prestige of the Cambridge Medical School as well as the prosperity of Downing College.

Latham gave the Croonian Lectures in 1886 and the Harveian Oration in 1888. He resigned from Addenbrooke's in 1899, and left Cambridge for London in 1912.

Latham was married twice. The first marriage was in 1862 to Jamima M'Diurmid Burns (d. 1877). They had four sons and a daughter. The second marriage was in 1884 to Marianne Frances, daughter of James Fogo Bernard, F.R.C.P., of Clifton, and niece of John Lawrence, 1st Baron Lawrence and Sir Henry Montgomery Lawrence. There were no children from the second marriage. Four of Peter W. Latham's sons predeceased him. His son Arthur Carlyle Latham (1867–1923) became a physician and was elected FRCP in 1904.

== Selected publications ==
- Latham, P. W. (3 April 1886). "The Croonian Lectures on Some Points in the Pathology of Rheumatism, Gout, and Diabetes. Lecture I". Br Med J. 1 (1318): 629–636. doi:10.1136/bmj.1.1318.629. PMC 2256812. PMID 20751513.
- Latham, P. W. (10 April 1886). "The Croonian Lectures on Some Points in the Pathology of Rheumatism, Gout, and Diabetes. Lecture II". Br Med J. 1 (1319): 674–681. doi:10.1136/bmj.1.1319.674. PMC 2256828. PMID 20751519.
- Latham, P. W. (17 April 1886). "The Croonian Lectures on Some Points in the Pathology of Rheumatism, Gout, and Diabetes. Lecture III". Br Med J. 1 (1320): 730–737. doi:10.1136/bmj.1.1320.730. PMC 2256987. PMID 20751529.
- Latham, P. W. (20 October 1888). "The Harveian Oration, on Blood-Changes in Disease". Br Med J. 2 (1451): 859–864. doi:10.1136/bmj.2.1451.859. PMC 2198486. PMID 20752462.
