= Elmsett Park Wood =

Protected area in Suffolk, England

Coordinates: 52.077°N 1.012°E

- Site of Special Scientific Interest
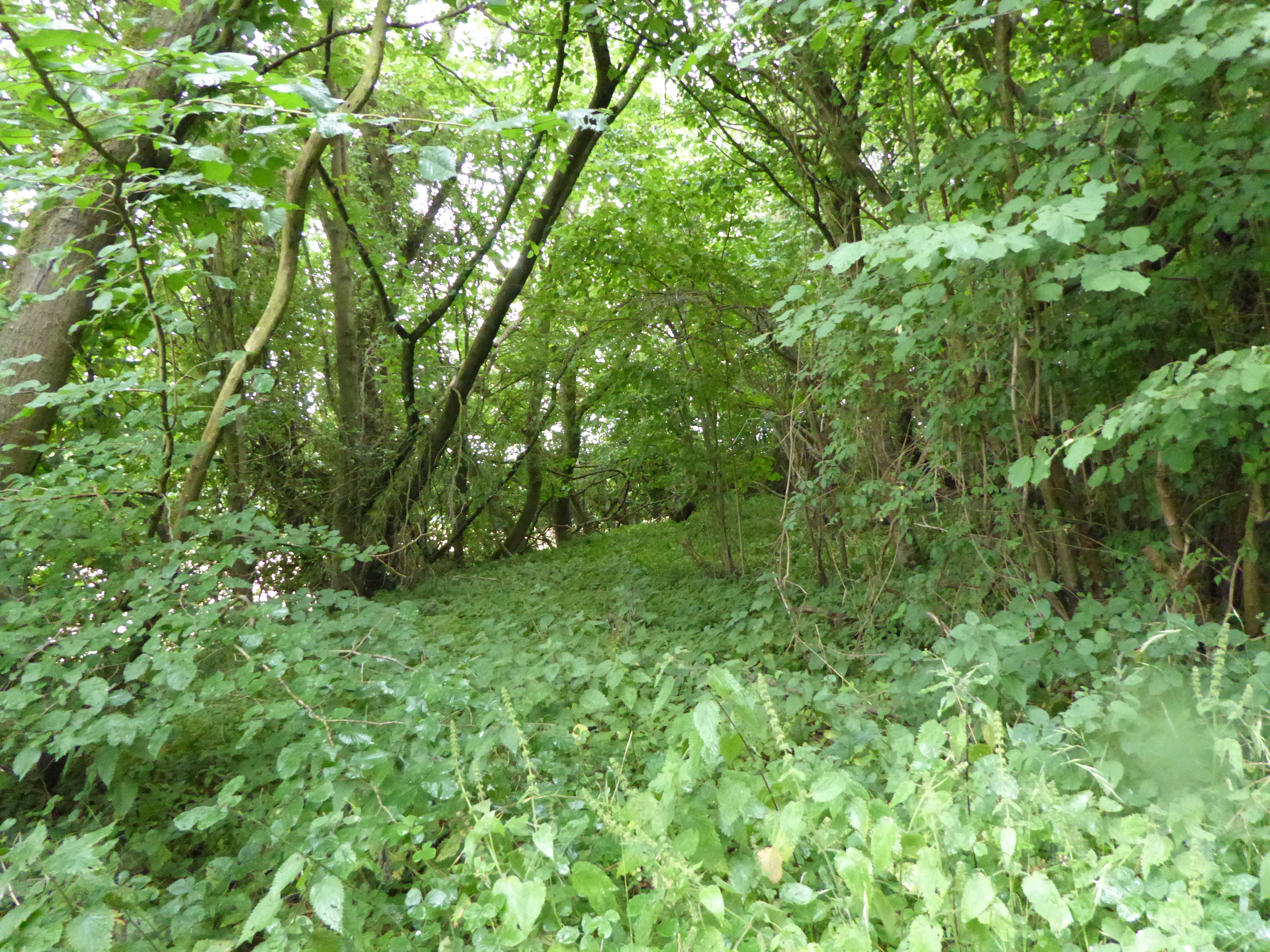
- Location of Elmsett Park Wood.
- Area of search: Suffolk
- Grid reference: TM 065 464
- Interest: Biological
- Area: 8.6 hectares
- Notification date: 1984
- Location map: Magic Map

Elmsett Park Wood is an 8.6-hectare (21-acre) biological Site of Special Scientific Interest east of Elmsett in Suffolk.

This coppice with standards site has diverse woodland types and ground flora. Plants indicative of ancient woodland include nettle-leaved bellflower, wood spurge, butterfly orchid and the uncommon spurge laurel.

The site is private property with no public access.
