= John Short Hewett =

British priest and academic

- Born: 1781; Calcutta
- Died: 12 December 1835 (aged 53–54); Boulogne-sur-Mer
- Education: Clare College, Cambridge
- Occupations: Rector of Rotherhithe Fellow of Clare College, Cambridge Chaplain and Fellow of Downing College, Cambridge
- Spouse: Mary Anne Selby-Hele
- Children: 2 including Rev. John Hewett

John Short Hewett (1781 – 12 December 1835) was an Anglican priest and academic who served as Chaplain and Fellow of Downing College, Cambridge, Fellow of Clare College, Cambridge, Chaplain to the Forces and Rector of Rotherhithe. He came from a distinguished family, his brother was Dr Cornwallis Hewett, his half-brother was Sir Prescott Gardner Hewett, 1st Bt., he was father to Rev. John Hewett and grandfather to Sir John Prescott Hewett and Rear Admiral George Hayley Hewett and his nephew became Vice-Admiral Sir William Nathan Wrighte Hewett, VC.

== Early life ==
Hewett was born in India in 1781, the son of William Nathan Wright Hewett of Bilham Hall, near Doncaster, a once wealthy landowner who lost the majority of his fortune to horse-racing and had to leave the country for Calcutta. Hewett was educated at Clare College, Cambridge which he matriculated into in 1799 and graduated with a Bachelor of Arts degree in 1803.

== Career ==
Following his Bachelor of Arts degree, he was ordained a deacon at Ely Cathedral on 22 October 1803, and appointed curate of Stow cum Quy and Croxton in Cambridgeshire and later was appointed a priest at Norwich Cathedral on 23 September 1804. However, throughout this time he was still studying at the University of Cambridge and graduated with a Master of Arts degree in 1805 and was appointed Fellow of Clare College, Cambridge as well as being Fellow and Chaplain of Downing College, Cambridge. In 1807 he resigned his position as Vicar of Cromer in Norfolk. In 1808 he was appointed Curate of Toft with Caldecote in Cambridgeshire and in 1811 he was appointed Vicar of the Parish Church of Sheringham in Norfolk, although he relinquished that later. Following his appointment as Vicar of Sheringham, Hewett served as Chaplain to the Forces and in 1816 was appointed Rector of Elmsett, Suffolk until 1817 when transferred to the Rectory of Rotherhithe where he served until 1835, along with his apportionment to the Rectory of Ewhurst, East Sussex in 1825 where he also served until 1835. In 1825 Hewett received his Doctorate of Divinity from Clare College, Cambridge. In 1835 he resigned from the church to live in Boulogne-sur-Mer until his death on 12 December 1835.

== Family ==
On 19 February 1828 Hewett married Mary Ann Selby-Hele, daughter of the Rev. Robert Hele Selby-Hele and Felicia Elizabeth Horne, daughter of George Horne, Bishop of Norwich. The marriage took place in Brede, East Sussex. The couple had two children together:

- Rev. John Hewett
- Felicia Hewett, married William Johnstone Bellingham, son of Sir Alan Bellingham, 2nd Bt.

Hewett died in Boulogne-sur-Mer, France on 12 December 1835 and his wife outlived him by almost 40 years dying in Brede, Sussex on 25 September 1873.
