= Le Hamel, Somme =

Le Hamel
- Commune
- View of Le Hamel

- Coat of arms
- Location of Le Hamel
- Location within France Location within Hauts-de-France
- Coordinates: 49°53′00″N 2°34′00″E
- Country: France
- Region: Hauts-de-France
- Department: Somme
- Arrondissement: Amiens
- Canton: Corbie
- Intercommunality: Val de Somme

Government
  - Mayor (2020–2026): Stéphane Chevin
- Area^{1}: 9.12 km^{2} (3.52 sq mi)
- Elevation: 83 m (272 ft)
- Highest elevation: 101 m (331 ft)
- Lowest elevation: 28 m (92 ft)
- Population (2023): 492
  - Density: 53.9/km^{2} (140/sq mi)
- Time zone: UTC+01:00 (CET)
  - Summer (DST): UTC+02:00 (CEST)
- INSEE/Postal code: 80411 /80800
- ^{1} French Land Register data, which excludes lakes, ponds, glaciers > 1 km^{2} (0.386 sq mi or 247 acres) and river estuaries.

Le Hamel (French pronunciation: [lə amɛl]) is a commune in the Somme department and Hauts-de-France region of northern France.

== Geography ==
Le Hamel is situated some 20 km east of Amiens in the valley of the Somme. The surrounding district is the historical Santerre, a lightly wooded and agricultural plateau.

== History ==
The settlement is first documented in 1184 as belonging to the powerful abbey of Corbie. The name has the same root as hameau ("hamlet"), a small rural settlement.

The town and surrounding countryside was the scene of the Battle of Hamel on 4 July 1918, during World War I. The battle, despite being small in scale, is notable for being the first instance in which combined arms tactics were used in warfare.

== Places of interest ==
- A park commemorating the 1000+ Australian troops who died in the Battle of Hamel was inaugurated on 4 July 1998, exactly 80 years after the date of the event. The site symbolises the friendship between France and Australia.
- The lakes of the Somme valley.
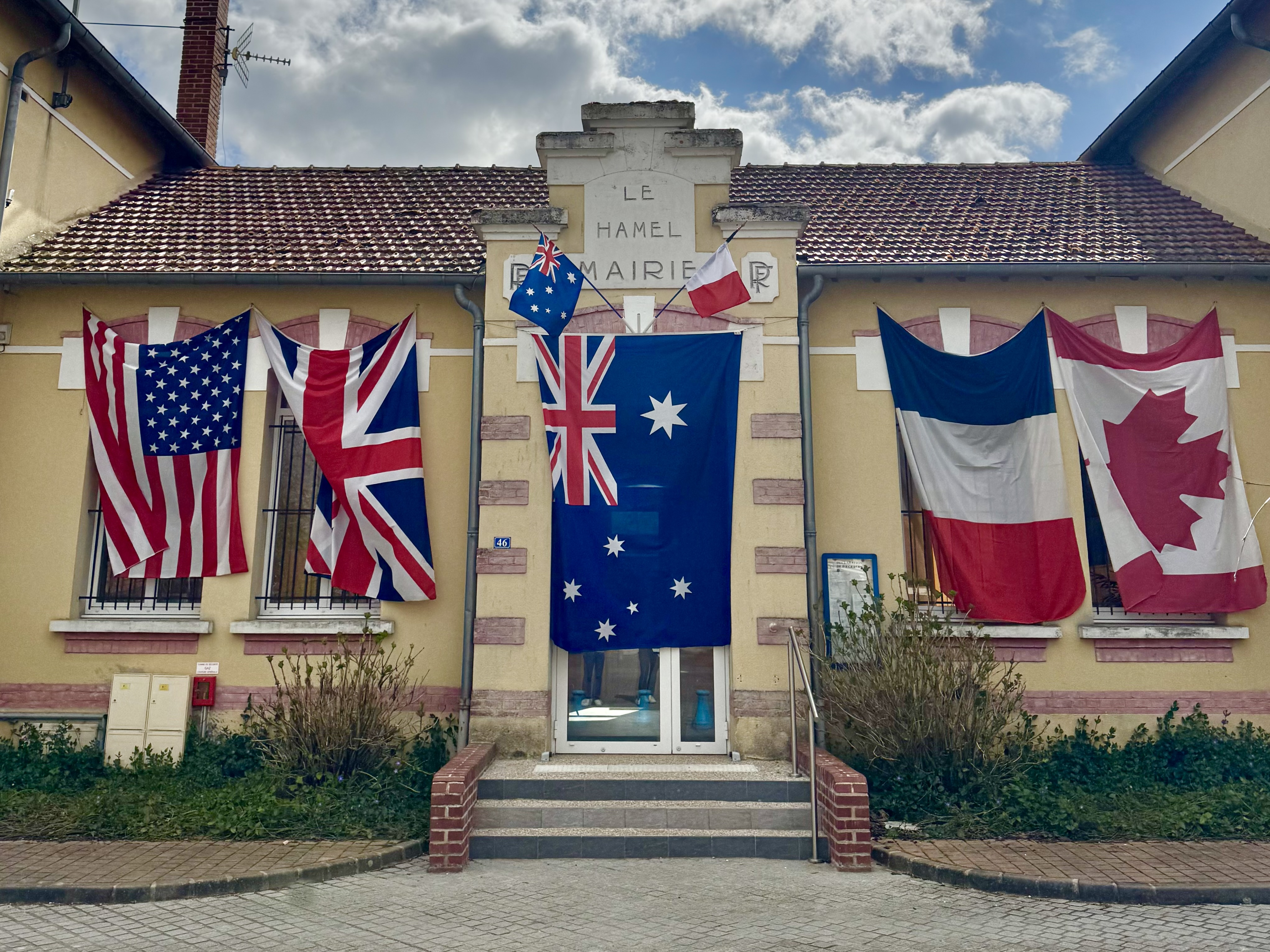
The village hall

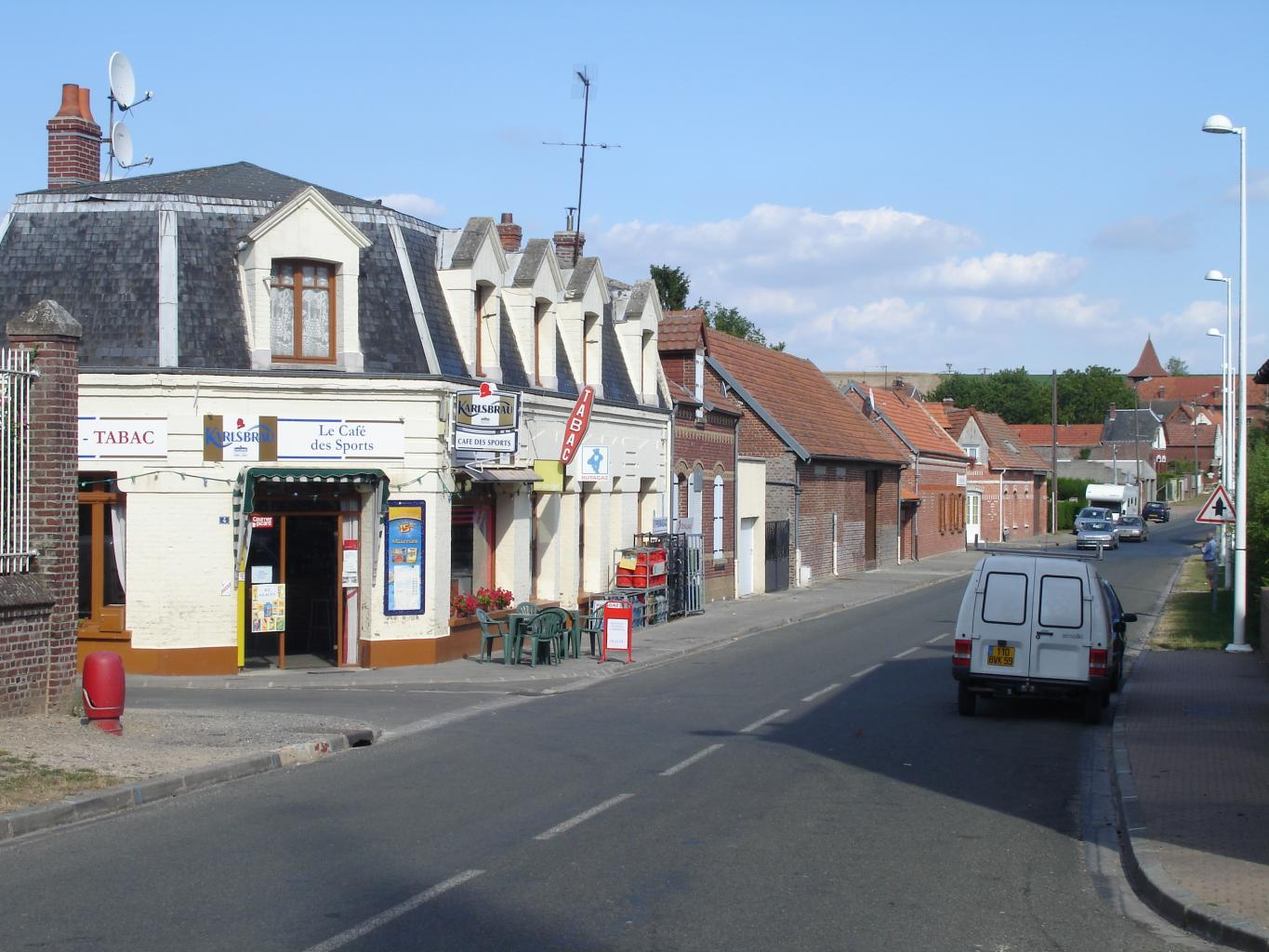
The main street

Australian Corps Memorial

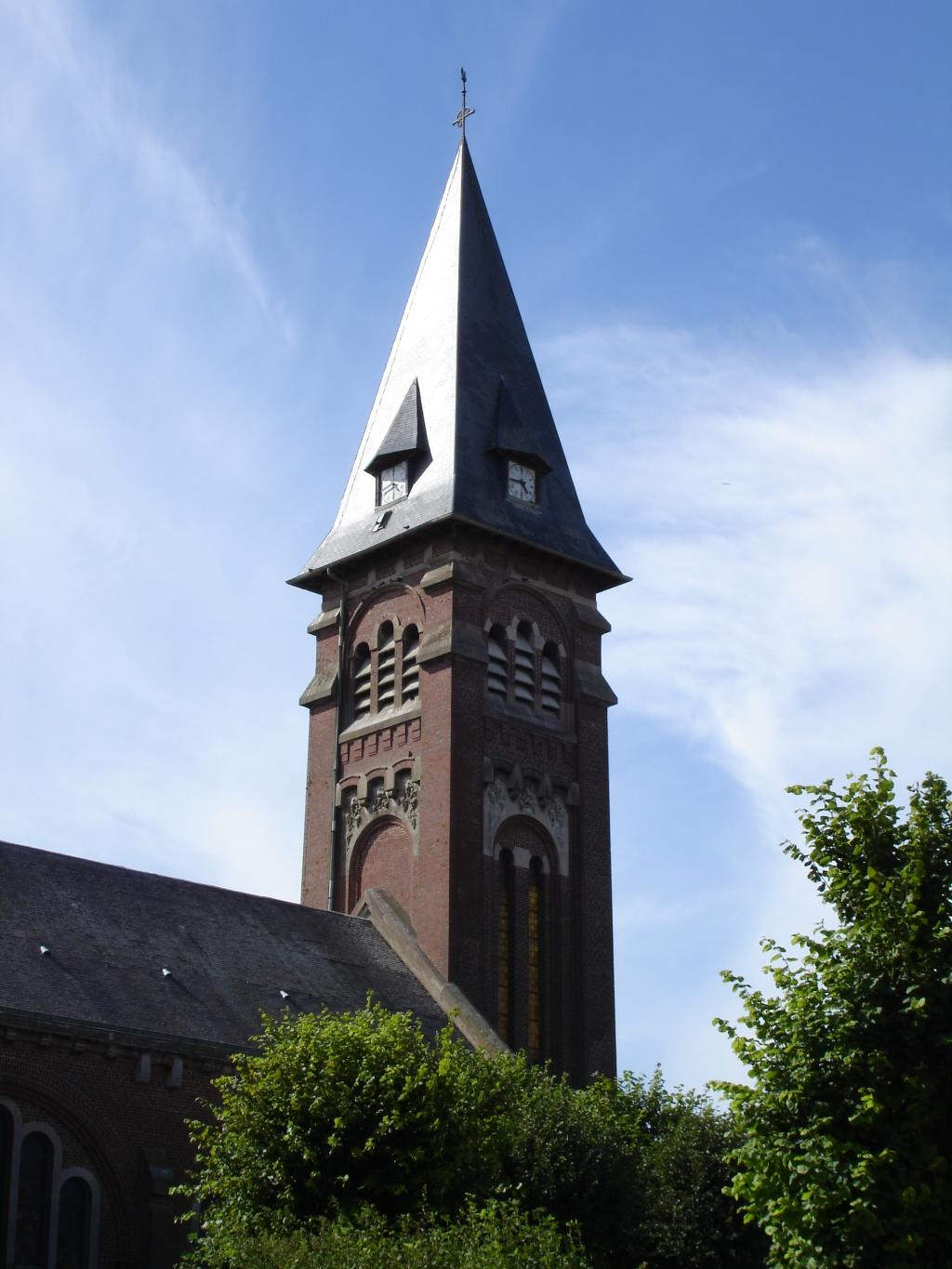
Church

== Population ==
Historical population

Year	Pop.	±% p.a.
1793	595	—
1800	622	+0.64%
1806	736	+2.84%
1821	842	+0.90%
1831	960	+1.32%
1836	1,017	+1.16%
1841	1,063	+0.89%
1846	1,108	+0.83%
1851	1,256	+2.54%
1856	1,146	−1.82%
1861	1,112	−0.60%
1866	1,070	−0.77%
1872	993	−1.24%
1876	961	−0.82%
1881	949	−0.25%
1886	911	−0.81%
1891	927	+0.35%
1896	844	−1.86%
1901	869	+0.59%

Year	Pop.	±% p.a.
1906	799	−1.67%
1911	621	−4.92%
1921	386	−4.64%
1926	484	+4.63%
1931	526	+1.68%
1936	466	−2.39%
1946	453	−0.28%
1954	495	+1.11%
1962	448	−1.24%
1968	472	+0.87%
1975	469	−0.09%
1982	451	−0.56%
1990	489	+1.02%
1999	519	+0.66%
2007	521	+0.05%
2012	515	−0.23%
2017	501	−0.55%
2023	492	−0.30%

Source: EHESS and INSEE (1968-2023)

== See also ==
- Communes of the Somme department
- Battle of Le Hamel
