= William Webster Fisher =

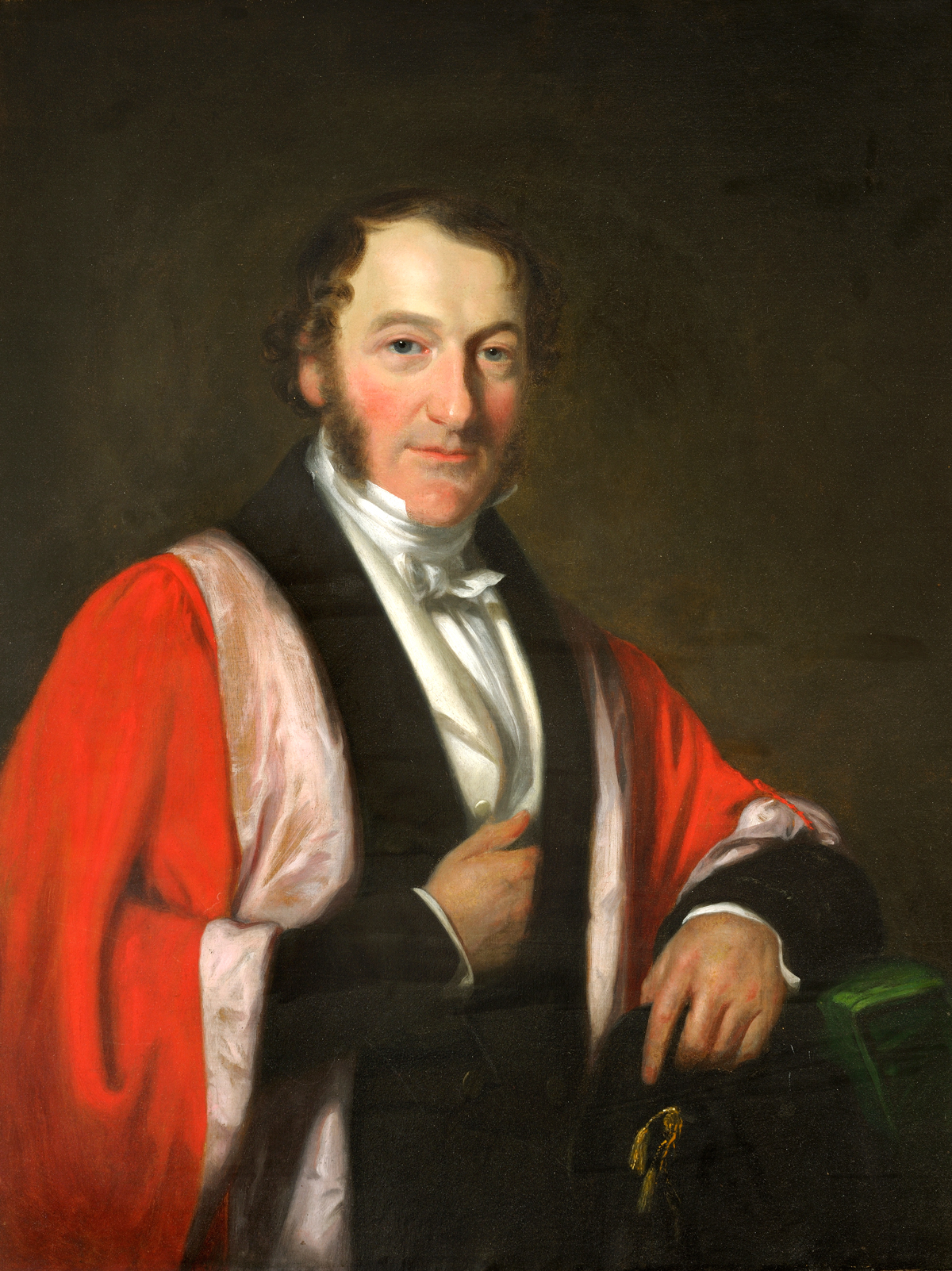
William Webster Fisher by George Richmond, 1848

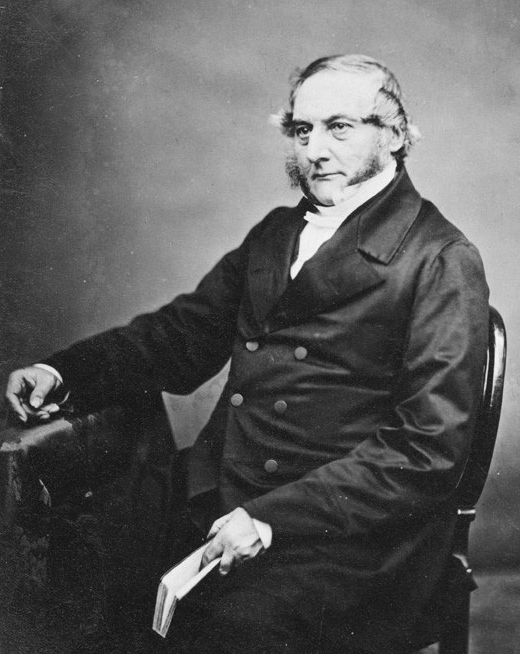
William Webster Fisher c. 1860

William Webster Fisher, M.D, (1798 or 1799 – 4 October 1874), was Downing Professor of Medicine at Cambridge University.

Fisher, a native of Westmoreland, was born in 1798 or 1799. He studied in the first instance at the University of Montpellier, where he befriended Auguste Comte and took the degree of M.D. in 1825. Two years later he was entered at Trinity College, Cambridge, where his brother, the Rev. John Hutton Fisher, was a fellow and assistant-tutor. He later migrated to Downing College, where he graduated M.B. in 1834. Shortly afterwards he succeeded to a fellowship. Elected to the Downing Professorship of Medicine in 1841, Fisher resigned his fellowship in 1844. He, however, continued to hold some college offices.

In 1841 he proceeded M.D. His lectures were well attended. He acted for many years as one of the university examiners of students in medicine, and was an ex officio member of the university board of medical studies. In addition to fulfilling the duties of his professorship, Fisher had a large practice as a physician at Cambridge. He was formerly one of the physicians to Addenbrooke's Hospital, and on his resignation was appointed consulting physician there. Although for some time he had given up medical practice, he regularly delivered courses of lectures until 1868, after which they were read by a deputy, P. W. Latham, M.D., late fellow of Downing. Fisher was a fellow of the Cambridge Philosophical Society, and a contributor to its Transactions. He was highly esteemed in the university for his professional attainments and his conversational powers. He died at his lodge in Downing College, 4 October 1874, in his seventy-sixth year.
