= Prescott Gardner Hewett =

British surgeon

Sir Prescott Gardner Hewett, 1st Baronet, FRCS (3 July 1812 – 19 June 1891) was a British surgeon, and the son of a Yorkshire country gentleman.

== Life ==
Hewett lived for some years in early life in Paris, and started on a career as an artist, but abandoned it for surgery. He entered Saint George's Hospital, London (where his half-brother, Dr Cornwallis Hewett, was a physician from 1825 to 1833), becoming demonstrator of anatomy and curator of the museum. He was the pupil and intimate friend of Sir Benjamin Collins Brodie, and helped the latter in much of his work.

Eventually he rose to be anatomical lecturer, assistant-surgeon and surgeon to the hospital. In 1873 he was elected President of the Clinical Society of London. In 1876, he was president of the College of Surgeons, and in 1877, he was made serjeant-surgeon extraordinary to Queen Victoria, in 1884 serjeant-surgeon, and in 1883 he was created a baronet. In June 1874 he was elected a Fellow of the Royal Society

Hewett was a very good lecturer, but shrank from authorship; his lectures on Surgical Affections of the Head were, however, embodied in his treatise on the subject in Holmes's System of Surgery. As a surgeon, he was always extremely conservative, but hesitated at no operation, no matter how severe, when convinced of its expediency. He was a perfect operator, and one of the most trustworthy of counsellors.

Hewett died in 1891 and is buried in Brompton Cemetery, London.

== Family ==
He married, on 13 September 1849, Sarah, eldest daughter of the Rev. Joseph Cowell of Todmorden, Lancashire, by whom he had one son, who survived him only a few weeks, and two daughters.

Hewett had three older half-brothers including, Dr. Cornwallis Hewett and Rev. John Short Hewett. Through his older brothers, he was uncle to Vice-Admiral Sir William Hewett VC, KCB, KCSI and Rev. John Hewett and great-uncle to Sir John Hewett GCSI, KBE, CIE and Rear Admiral George Hayley Hewett CIE, ADC, RN.

Hewett family tree
- William Hewett of Millbrook, Bedfordshire and Dunton Bassett
  - William Hewett of Dunton Bassett (High Sheriff of Leicestershire in 1645)
    - Neale Hewett of Dunton Bassett
      - Thomas Hewett of Bilham Hall, near Doncaster
        - Selwood Hewett of Bilham Hall
          - William Nathan Wrighte Hewett of Bilham Hall
            - Rev. Dr. John Short Hewett DD
              - Rev. John Hewett
                - Sir John Prescott Hewett GCSI, KBE, CIE
                  - Colonel Henry Micklam Prescott Hewett of the 1st Royal Dragoons
                - Rear Admiral George Hayley Hewett CIE, ADC, RN
                - John Hewett, of The Mount, Wargrave, Berkshire
            - Dr. Cornwallis Hewett FRCP
            - William Wrighte Hewett
              - Vice-Admiral Sir William Hewett VC, KCB, KCSI
            - Sir Prescott Gardner Hewett, 1st Baronet
              - Sir Harry Hammerton Hewett, 2nd Baronet
      - Major Shuckburgh Hewett
        - General Sir George Hewett, 1st Baronet GCB PC (Ire)
          - Hewett baronets of Nether Seale

Baronetage of the United Kingdom
| New creation | Baronet (of Chesterfield Street, London); 1883–1891 | Succeeded by Henry Hammerton Hewett |
