= Anthony Courage =

British Army general

Brigadier-General Anthony Courage DSO MC
- Portrait by Walter Stoneman, 1919
- Born: 22 October 1875; Leatherhead, Surrey, England
- Died: 27 February 1944 (aged 68); Banbury, England
- Spouse: Mable Ada Hewett (m. 1903)
- Children: 4
- Military career
- Allegiance: United Kingdom
- Branch: British Army
- Rank: Brigadier-General
- Service number: 1896–1929
- Unit: 15th The King's Hussars
- Commands: 15th/19th The King's Royal Hussars
- Conflicts: Second Boer War; First World War
- Awards: Distinguished Service Order; Military Cross

Anthony Courage DSO MC (22 October 1875 – 27 February 1944) was a British Army officer who served in the 15th The King's Hussars in India, South Africa and the First World War.

== Early life ==
Courage was born on 22 October 1875 in The Red House, Leatherhead, Surrey, the son of Henry Courage of Gravenhurst House, Bolney, Sussex, and his wife Julia Harriet Knyvett. He was educated at Rugby School, followed by Royal Military College, Sandhurst.

== Military career ==
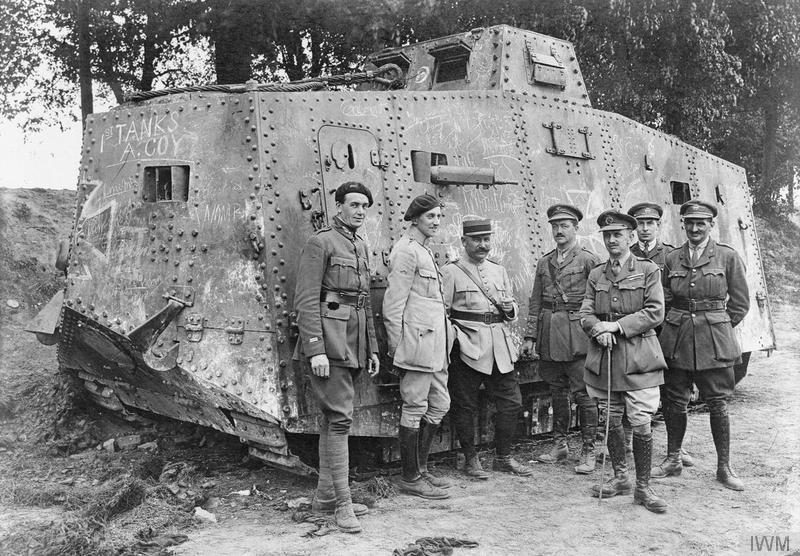
The German Spring Offensive, March–July 1918 with Brigadier-General Courage

Following Sandhurst, Courage commissioned into the 15th The King's Hussars in 1896 and was appointed Adjutant of the regiment. He served in India and South Africa with the Dorset Yeomanry in the Second Boer War. Later in the First World War Courage returned to the 15th The King's Hussars and sailed in the original British Expeditionary Force. On 18 February 1915 Courage was gazetted as having been appointed to the Military Cross. He was wounded during the Second Battle of Ypres and was appointed to the Staff of the General Headquarters in 1916. In 1917 Courage was promoted to Lt Col and appointed commander of the 2nd Tank Brigade during the Battle of Messines, the Battle of Passchendaele and the Battle of Cambrai. Following that he was then appointed commander of the 5th Tank Brigade attached to the Australian Corps during the battles of Hamel, Montdidier, First Battle of Villers-Bretonneux, Second Battle of Villers-Bretonneux, Amiens and against the Hindenburg Line. Following the 5th Tank Brigade, Courage was appointed commander of a Group of Two Tank Brigades. On 5 July 1918 he was awarded the Military Cross for "For conspicuous gallantry and devotion to duty in successfully organising Tanks in their assembly position and making dispositions which were mainly responsible for their successful attack. He showed splendid skill and resource." During the War, Courage was Mentioned in dispatches six times, awarded the Distinguished Service Order, the Military Cross, the Croix de Guerre avec palme. On 7 August 1918 Courage was promoted to temporary Brigadier-General, whilst still brevet Colonel. Following the war, he was confirmed as brevet Colonel. In 1924 he was appointed by the King a member of the Order of St John. He was then appointed Colonel of the 15th/19th The King's Royal Hussars in 1929 and remained in that position until his death in 1944. Whilst remaining Colonel, Courage retired from the Army on 12 February 1932 and was confirmed in his retirement as a Brigadier-General and given the retirement pay of a Colonel.

== Post service career ==
Courage was appointed Chairman of Courage & Co Ltd, the family brewery company, founded by his great-grandfather, John Courage. He was also appointed a Director of White Horse Distillery and of Hyderabad (Deccan), Company, Ltd.

== Personal life ==
Courage married Mable Ada Hewett, daughter of Sir John Hewett GCSI, KBE, CIE in July 1903 in St George's, Hanover Square and had issue.

- Leila May Courage (Jun 1905-Oct 1984), married Richard Leslie Agnew and had issue.
- Nigel Anthony Courage (1906-1965), died unmarried.
- Guy Courage (1908-1983), married Ann Dorothy Mary Stephenson and had issue.
- Anthony John Courage (1922-1944), died unmarried.

Courage was a keen sportsman with hunting, polo, fishing and shooting. He died on 27 February 1944 in Banbury.
