= John Hewett (priest) =

British priest

- Born: 6 August 1830; Ewhurst, East Sussex
- Died: 5 August 1911 (aged 80); Teignbridge
- Education: Clare College, Cambridge
- Occupation: Vicar of Babbacombe
- Spouses: Anna Louisa Lyster Hammon; Anne Robson
- Children: 5 including Sir John Prescott Hewett and George Hayley Hewett
- Parents: John Short Hewett (father); Mary Anne Selby-Hele (mother)

John Hewett, Vicar of Babbacombe (6 August 1830 – 5 August 1911) was a High Church Anglican priest and founder of the church of All Saints', Babbacombe and a friend and confidant of Anne Sutherland-Leveson-Gower, Duchess of Sutherland as well as the priest for Alexandra of Denmark whilst Princess of Wales. Hewett was also father of Sir John Prescott Hewett and of Rear Admiral George Hayley Hewett.

== Early life ==
Hewett was born on 6 August 1830, son of John Short Hewett, Rector of Ewhurst, East Sussex and his wife, Mary Ann Selby-Hele, granddaughter of George Horne, Bishop of Norwich. He came from a well connected family, he was nephew of Sir Prescott Gardner Hewett, 1st Baronet and Dr Cornwallis Hewett and the first-cousin of Vice-Admiral Sir William Nathan Wrighte Hewett. Hewett was educated at Clare College, Cambridge with which he Matriculated in 1849 and graduated with a Bachelor of Arts degree in 1853, he also later received a Master of Arts degree in 1857.

== Early ministry ==
Hewett was ordained as a deacon at Chichester Cathedral in 1855 by the Bishop of Chichester Ashurst Gilbert, whilst still studying for his Master of Arts degree at Clare College, Cambridge. Following ordination he was appointed curate of the Parish of Battle, East Sussex where he served 1855–57, during which time he was ordained as a priest at Peterborough Cathedral in 1856 by the then Bishop of Peterborough, George Davys. In 1857 he was appointed curate of the Parish of Compton Martin, Somerset where he resided for almost 15 years until 1865 when he was appointed to St Marychurch, Devon. During his time there, the population of Devon was increasing greatly as it became a popular holiday destination, particularly the area around Torquay, including the once small hamlet of Babbacombe was growing rapidly and lacked a church.

== All Saints', Babbacombe ==
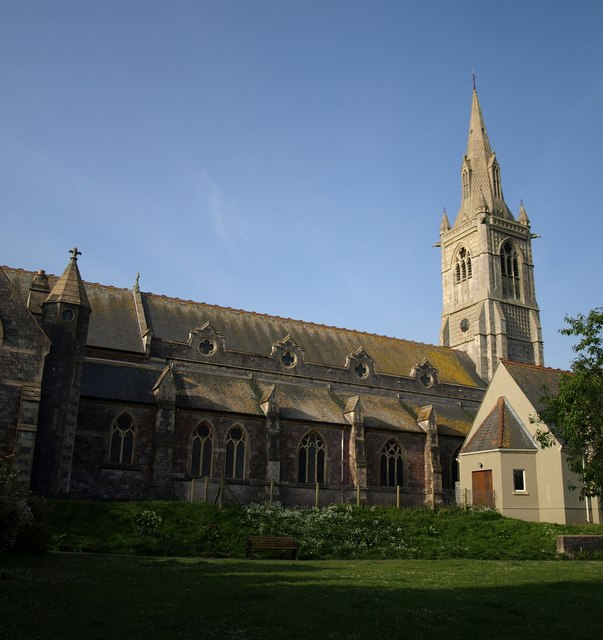
All Saints', Babbacombe

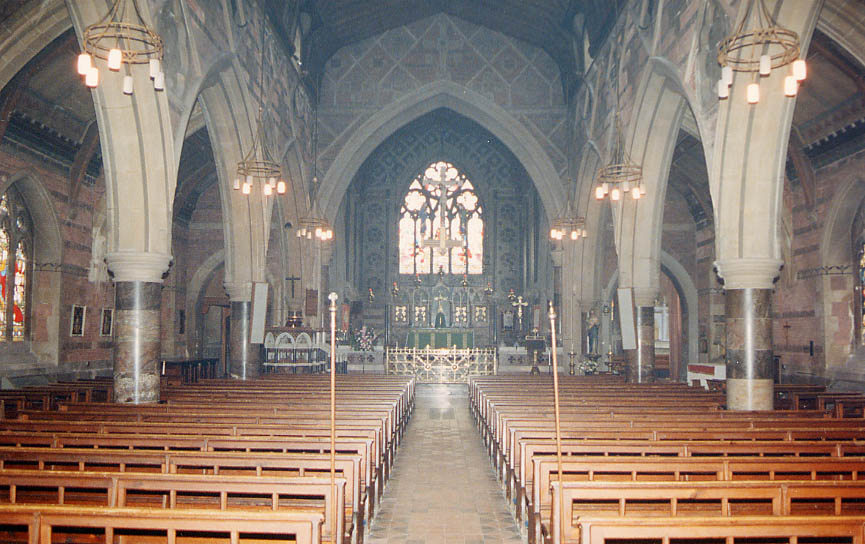
Interior of All Saints', Babbacombe

During his time in St Marychurch, Hewett visited Babbacombe regularly in his capacity as the local priest and realised that with the growing population there was also a need for a local church. With the help of the Duchess of Sutherland, Hewett put together a committee and they advised the Church of England that a Parish Church was required and Hewett was appointed Vicar of Babbacombe. Hewett arranged for the architect William Butterfield to be employed on the designs for the Church. The foundation stone for All Saints', Babbacombe was laid on 1 November 1867, (All Saints' Day) by Samuel Wilberforce, then Bishop of Oxford. Butterfield's design incorporated 50 varieties of Devon marbles into the Church. Work on the chancel began in September 1872 and was finished and opened with a tower and spire on 1 November 1874. Hewett's uncle the Rev. George Selby donated the East Window (depicted in the interior image) to the church. On the Church's completion he remained as Vicar and was a well loved member of the community.

== Later ministry ==
In 1879 as well as being Vicar of Babbacombe, Hewett was also appointed rural dean of Ipplepen. In his time as Vicar of Babbacombe, Hewett became a close confidant of the Anne Sutherland-Leveson-Gower, Duchess of Sutherland who regularly attended his services and was later buried in 1888 at Babbacombe Cemetery and she is commemorated in All Saints'. As well as the Duchess of Sutherland, the Princess of Wales and her children also regularly worshipped at the Church, during March 1886 and Hewett acted as the Princess of Wales' priest.

During his career as Vicar of Babbacombe, he played a very active role in the charitable side of the church, being a patron of the House of Rest of Babbacombe, along with the Duchess of Sutherland. He was also a patron of the House of Mercy which had on its council high members of society, including the Earl of St Germans and Earl of Devon. When he reached the age of 80, he retired from All Saints', Babbacombe to live in Teignmouth where he was later buried.

== Family ==
In October 1853, Hewett married Anna Louisa Lyster Hammon, daughter of Captain William Hammon of the East India Company Navy, they had five children together.

- Sir John Prescott Hewett GCSI, KBE, CIE (25 August 1854 – 27 September 1941), a colonial administrator who organized the 1911 Delhi Durbar Honours and served as MP for Luton.
- Rear Admiral George Hayley Hewett CIE, ADC, RN (12 November 1855 – 7 October 1930)
- John Hewett, of The Mount, Wargrave, Berkshire (1865 – 2 June 1933), married Catherine Rose, daughter of Philip Davies Rose of Norcliffe House, a wealthy landowner in both Devon and Sydney and descendant of the Roses of Kilravock, through her mother, Catherine was great-granddaughter of Charles Manners, 4th Duke of Rutland and first cousin of Sir Henry Josias Stracey, 5th Baronet, George Milles, 1st Earl Sondes and John Wodehouse, 3rd Earl of Kimberley.
- Felicia Louisa Hewett
- Mary Felicia Hewett

His wife Anna died in 1884 aged 55 and he remarried two years later to a Miss Anne Robson of Sunderland. Hewett died in Teignmouth on 5 August 1911, his epitaph was In te domine speravi (“In You, O Lord, have I hoped”), a window was erected in All Saints', Babbacombe in his honour.
