= Elmsett =

Village in Suffolk, England

Coordinates: 52.079°N 1.001°E

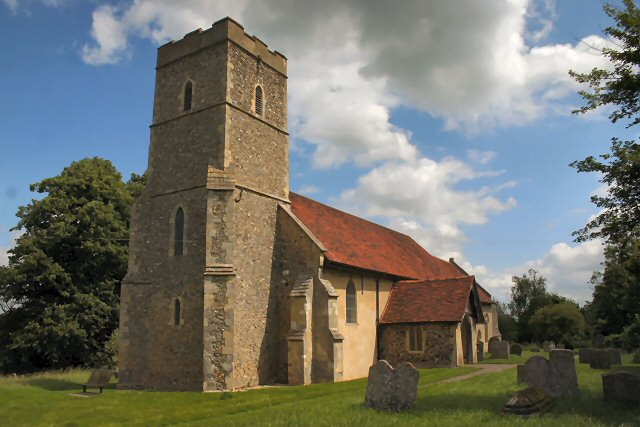
- St Peter's Church, Elmsett

- Location within Suffolk
- Population: 788 (2011)
- District: Babergh
- Shire county: Suffolk
- Region: East
- Country: England
- Sovereign state: United Kingdom
- Post town: Ipswich
- Postcode district: IP7
- UK Parliament: South Suffolk

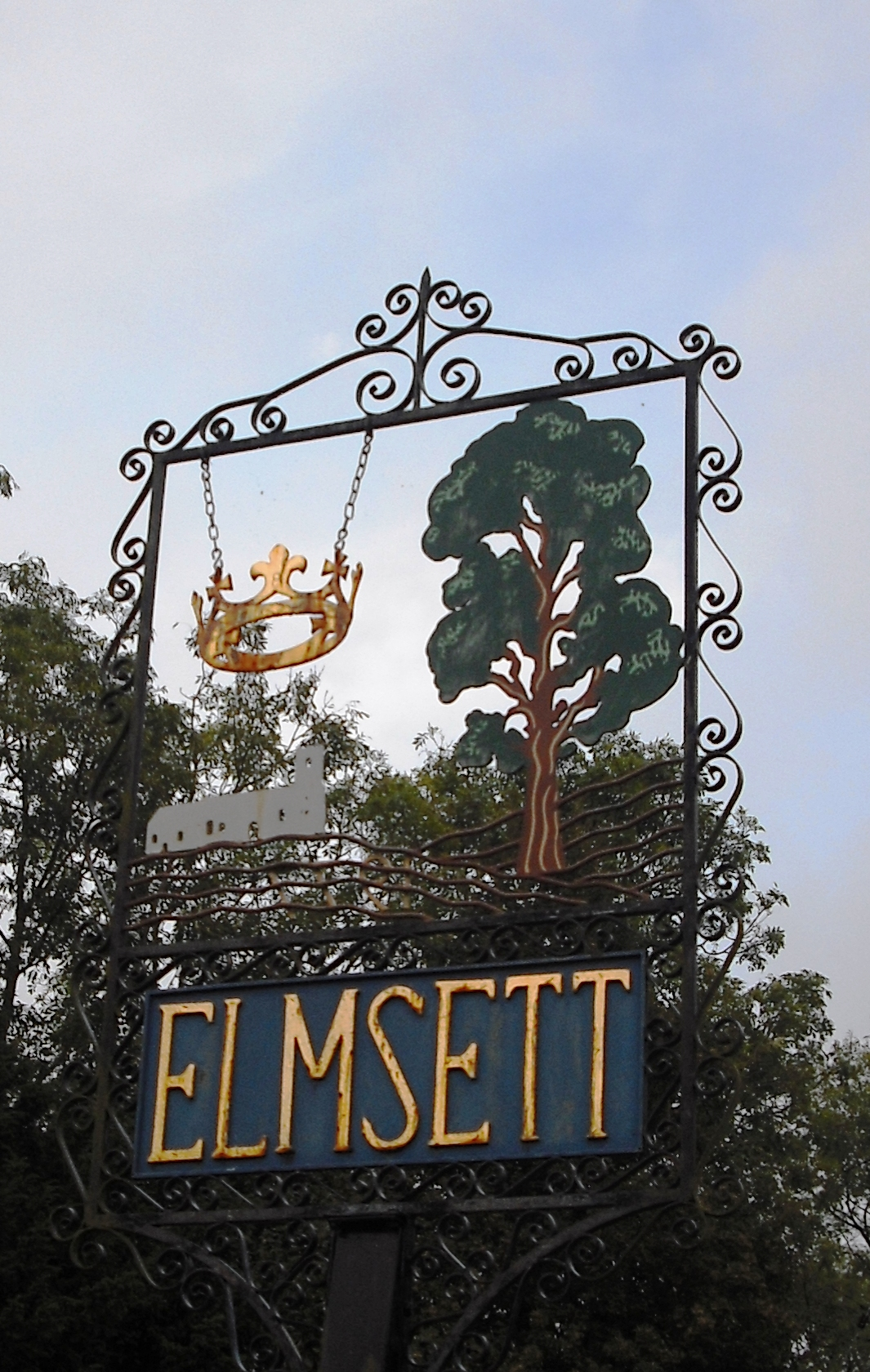
Village sign

Elmsett is a village and civil parish in Suffolk, England. Located around three miles north-east of Hadleigh, it is in Babergh district. In 2005, it had a population of 826, reducing to 788 at the 2011 census.

== History ==
The first record of Elmsett comes from 995 when it was written Ylmesaeton (Ylme for Elm, Saeten for dwellers). The village was in Cosford Hundred. By 1900, the village had around 16 farms and the Elmsett Mill, together employing most of the residents.

In 1932, the village made national news when Charles Westren, a farmer at Elmsett Hall, refused to pay his tithe to the church. As a result, goods were seized from the hall. This is remembered by the Tithe memorial opposite the church, on which it is inscribed (the inscription contains the spelling mistake "commerate" instead of "commemorate"):

1934. To commerate the Tithe seizure at Elmsett Hall of furniture including baby's bed and blankets, herd of dairy cows, eight corn stacks and seed stacks valued at £1200 for tithe valued at £385.

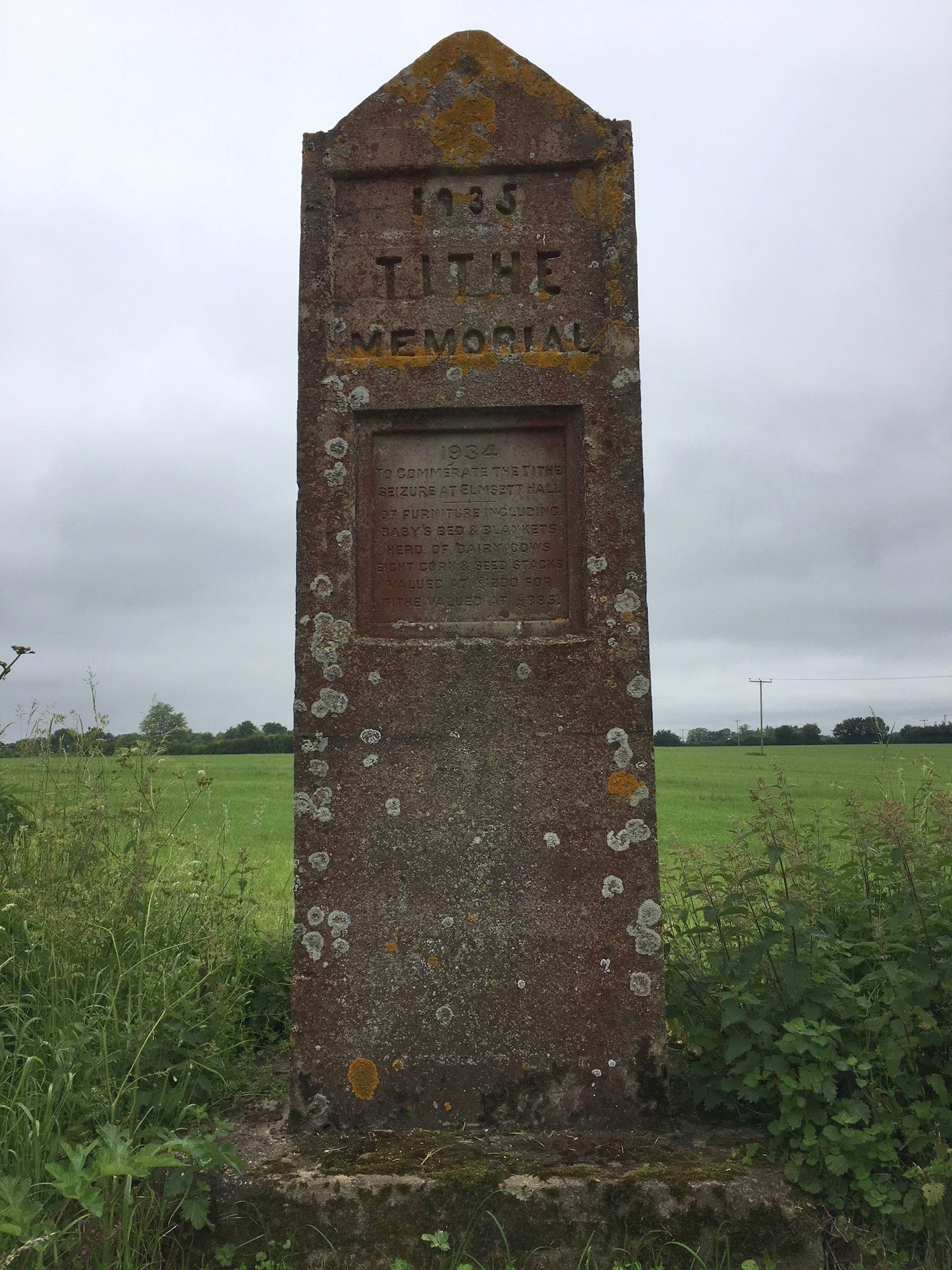
Elmsett tithe memorial

The incident was one of many across the country, and the events were documented by George Orwell in A Clergyman's Daughter.

On the night of 11–12 May 1941, during a widespread German air raid on the district, a bomb demolished a row of cottages in the village and killed 10 civilians.

Today, the village is home to numerous listed buildings, though most of its Elm trees were killed off by Dutch Elm Disease in the 1960s and 1970s. The parish contains Elmsett Park Wood, an area of Ancient Woodland classified as an SSSI. Borley's Wood, Langham Close Wood and Lucy Wood are also protected Ancient Woodland.

In 2005, Elmsett Greenlife Grove Scheme (EGGS) created a community wood near the school

There is a small grass airfield in the west of the parish.

== St Peter's Church ==
The parish church of St Peter is a Grade I listed building.

== Notable people ==
- Jade Holland Cooper (born 1986/87), British fashion designer
- John Short Hewett, cleric and academic, was Rector of Elmsett
