= Sir John Hewett =

ICS officer in British India (1854–1941)

Sir John Hewett GCSI KBE CIE GCStJ
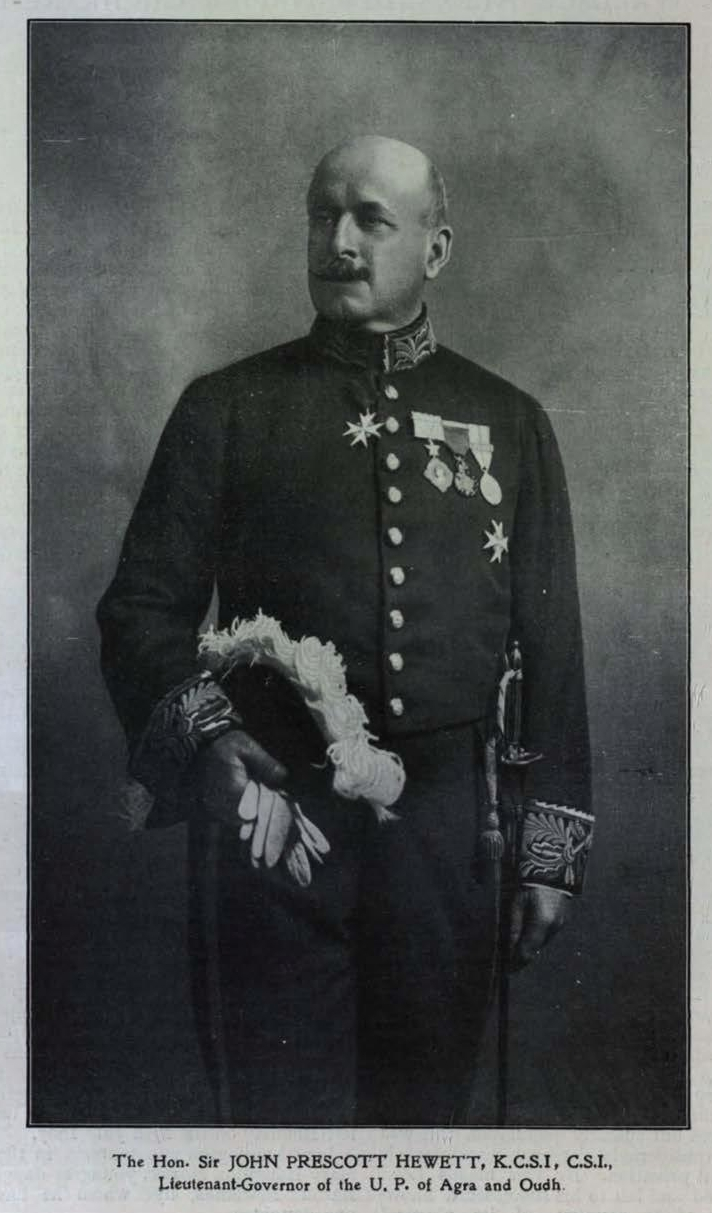
- c. 1907

Member of Parliament for Luton
- In office 15 November 1922 – 16 November 1923
- Preceded by: Cecil Harmsworth
- Succeeded by: Geoffrey Howard

Personal details
- Born: 25 August 1854 London, England
- Died: 27 September 1941 (aged 87) Chipping Norton, Oxfordshire, England
- Spouse: Ethel Charlotte Webster
- Parents: Rev. John Hewett (father); Anna Hammon (mother)
- Education: Winchester College
- Alma mater: Balliol College, Oxford
- Occupation: Colonial Administrator

Sir John Prescott Hewett, GCSI, KBE, CIE, GCStJ (25 August 1854 – 27 September 1941) was a British Indian civil servant who served as Lieutenant Governor of the United Provinces of Agra and Oudh and later as a Conservative MP for Luton.

== Early life ==
Hewett was born in Barham, Kent, son of Rev. John Hewett, vicar of Babbacombe, Torquay, and his wife, Anna Louisa Lyster, daughter of Captain William Hammon and Mary Bellingham. Hewett was older brother of Rear Admiral George Hayley Hewett RN, his father Rev. John Hewett was the nephew of Sir Prescott Gardner Hewett, 1st Baronet and the first-cousin of Vice-Admiral Sir William Nathan Wrighte Hewett. He was educated at Winchester College and Balliol College, Oxford.

== Biography ==
Hewett joined the Indian Civil Service in 1875 and worked in Agra, Bulandshahr and Mathura. He enjoyed travel and hunting in the Himalayan terai and later wrote on his hunting. In 1898 he was a member of the Indian plague commission. In 1902 Lord Curzon posted him as acting chief commissioner to the Central Provinces, and he was confirmed in the post in 1903. He was involved in famine relief during 1907 and was knighted in the same year. He was posted lieutenant governor of the United Provinces of Agra and Oudh in the same year and helped develop industry in the region. He was keen on vocational education and obtained funds for establishing an agricultural college in Kanpur and organized a trade exhibition in 1910. He was a conservative who preferred Indian peasants as workers rather than be swayed by Western-educated Indians in the Indian National Congress. He tried to persuade John Morley to go slow on reforms to allow Indians in the civil service. In 1911 he was relieved from his position as governor and sent to Delhi to organize the coronation durbar of King George V and Queen Mary.

He retired in 1912, but continued to invest in tea and rubber companies across the colonies. He served as the founding chairman of the governing body of the School of Oriental and African Studies in London. In 1918 he was sent to Mesopotamia to examine the move to a civilian rule there. He angered Lord Montagu by speaking to the army officers there against the proposed reform and removal of military rule. He became the Member of Parliament for Luton as a Unionist in 1922, but lost it in 1923. He continued to make hunting trips to India.

== Personal life ==
Hewett married Ethel Charlotte, daughter of Henry Binny Webster in 1879. They had three children:

- Mabel Ada Hewett, married Anthony Courage in July 1903 in St George's, Hanover Square
- Colonel Henry Micklam Prescott Hewett of the 1st Royal Dragoons
- Lorna Ethel Hewett

He wrote Jungle Trails in Northern India (1938) which was autobiographical in which he appeared to avoid mention of his wife. Lord Curzon had suggested conflict in the household. His daughter Lorna, undertook a trek in Ladakh in 1921 and was a keen outdoors woman was featured in his book. Hewett died at his home The Court House, Chipping Warden and was buried there.

== Sources ==
- Craig, FWS British Parliamentary Election Results 1885-1918
- Whitaker's Almanack, 1923 and 1924 editions

Parliament of the United Kingdom
Preceded by Cecil Harmsworth	Member of Parliament for Luton; 1922–1923	Succeeded by Geoffrey Howard
