= Downing Professor of Medicine =

Senior Professorship at University of Cambridge

The Downing Professorship of Medicine was one of the senior professorships in medicine at the University of Cambridge.

The chair was founded in 1800 as a bequest of Sir George Downing, the founder of Downing College, Cambridge. The original electors were the Archbishop of Canterbury, the Archbishop of York, and the masters of the colleges of Clare, St John's and Downing.

The chair was discontinued on the death of its final holder in 1930.

== Downing Professors of Medicine ==
- Busick Harwood (1800–1814)
- Cornwallis Hewett (1814–1841)
- William Webster Fisher (1841–1874)
- Peter Wallwork Latham (1874–1894)
- John Buckley Bradbury (1894–1930)
