= John Buckley Bradbury =

English medical doctor and professor of medicine

Professor John Buckley Bradbury FRSE FRCP
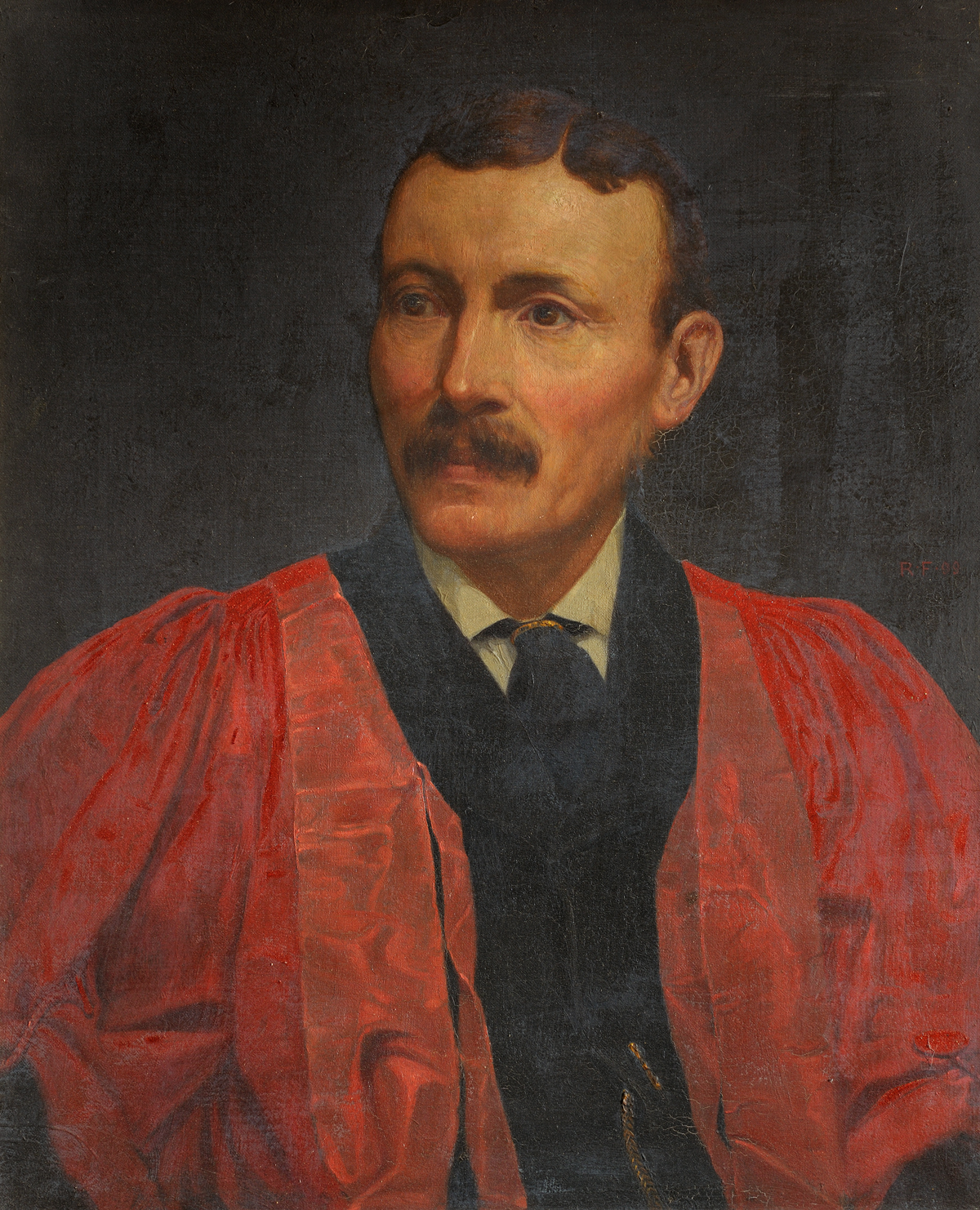
- Bradbury in 1899.

Downing Professor of Medicine, University of Cambridge
- In office 1894–1930

Personal details
- Born: 27 February 1841 Saddleworth, West Riding of Yorkshire, England
- Died: 4 June 1930 (aged 89)
- Occupation: Physician

John Buckley Bradbury (27 February 1841 – 4 June 1930) was a medical doctor and Downing Professor of Medicine. The chair was discontinued on his death in 1930.

== Life ==
He was born in Saddleworth in Yorkshire the eldest son of John Bradbury a merchant and manufacturer.

He was educated at King's College, London and then Caius College, Cambridge University. From 1866 to 1876 he was a lecturer in Comparative Anatomy at Downing College in Cambridge.

He served as a physician at Addenbrooke's Hospital in Cambridge from 1869 to 1919.

He delivered the Bradshaw Lecture in 1895 and the Croonian Lecture in 1899. He was an expert on sleep disorders and vertigo.

During the First World War he served as a lieutenant-colonel in the Royal Army Medical Corps at the Eastern General Hospital.

He died on 4 June 1930 after a week's illness.

He is buried in the Parish of the Ascension Burial Ground in Cambridge, with his second wife Jane Gwatkin. They had one son and two daughters.
