= Babbacombe =

District of Torquay, Devon, England

Coordinates: 50.47°N 03.52°W

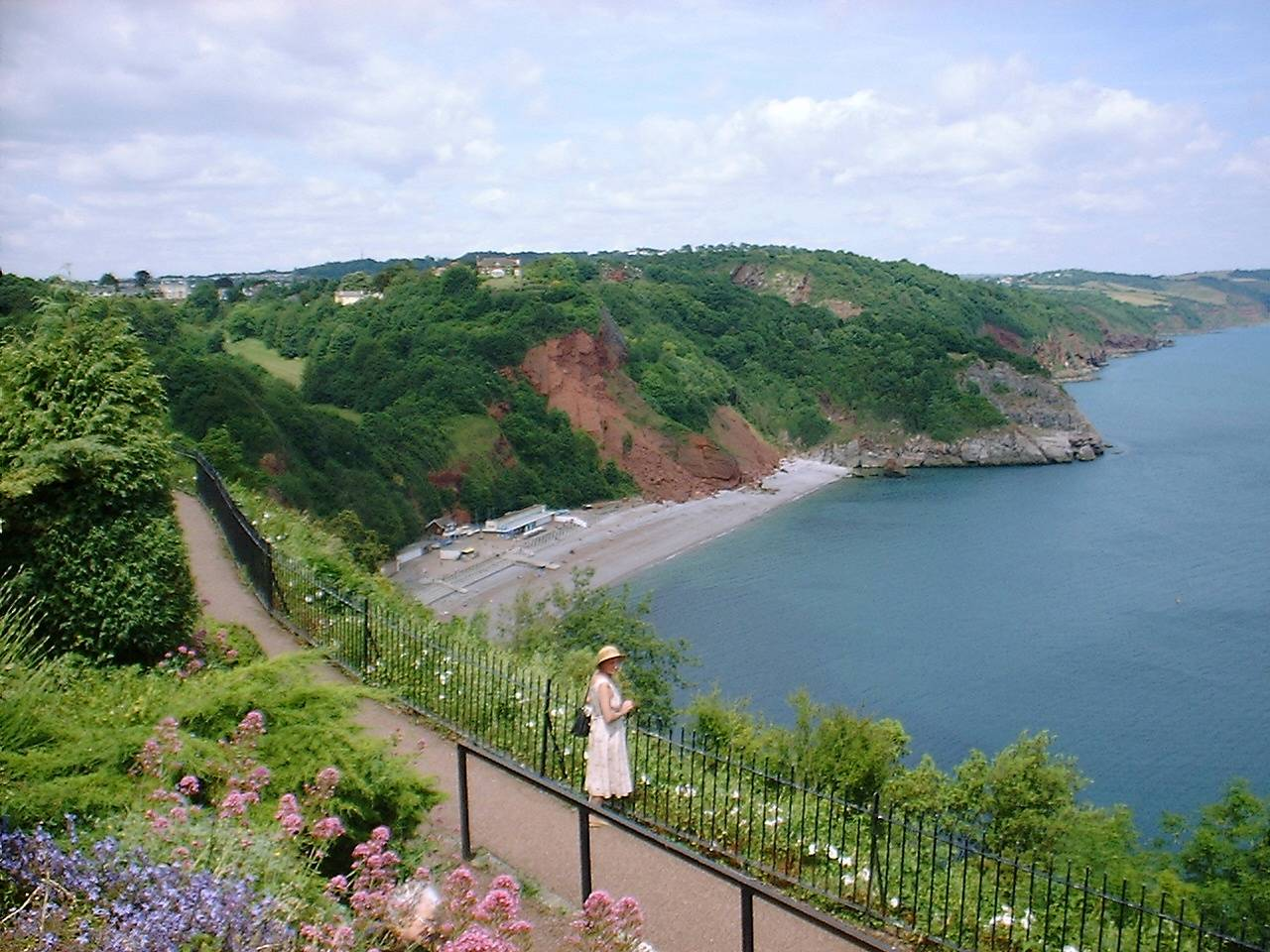
- Oddicombe Beach from Babbacombe Downs

- Location within Devon
- OS grid reference: SX9265
- Unitary authority: Torbay
- Ceremonial county: Devon
- Region: South West
- Country: England
- Sovereign state: United Kingdom
- Post town: Torquay
- Postcode district: TQ1
- Police: Devon and Cornwall
- Fire: Devon and Somerset
- Ambulance: South Western

Babbacombe is a district of Torquay, Devon, England. It is notable for Babbacombe Model Village, the Babbacombe Theatre and its clifftop green, Babbacombe Downs, from which Oddicombe Beach is accessed via Babbacombe Cliff Railway. Frequent buses connect Babbacombe with Torquay town centre while service 22 operates between Dawlish Warren and South Devon College.

== Churches and schools ==
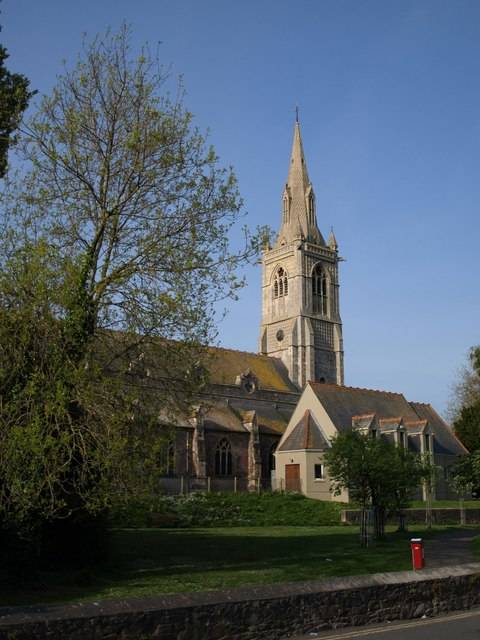
All Saints Church, Babbacombe

The Church of All Saints was designed by the architect William Butterfield and built in 1868-74 under the aegis of Rev. John Hewett whose initiative it had been to build it. It is in the Neogothic style and has fine polychrome stonework in the font, pulpit and the chancel floor made from Devon marble. All Saints Church belongs to the Anglo-Catholic tradition within the Church of England, and its parish is one of those in the Diocese of Exeter. The first vicar was Fr. John Hewitt, whose ministry began when the church was founded and continued to his retirement in 1910.

Babbacombe has a primary school, All Saints Babbacombe Church of England Primary School.

== Notable people ==
Rev. John Hewett was Vicar of Babbacombe and founded the church there.

The actress and dancer Rosina Vokes (1854-1894) died in Babbacombe.
