= William Hewett =

Recipient of the Victoria Cross

Vice-Admiral Sir William Hewett VC KCB KCSI
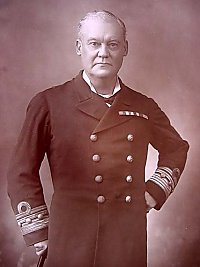
- Born: 12 August 1834; Brighton, Sussex
- Died: 13 May 1888 (aged 53); Portsmouth, Hampshire
- Burial place: Highland Road Cemetery, Portsmouth
- Military career
- Allegiance: United Kingdom
- Branch: Royal Navy
- Service years: 1847–1888
- Rank: Vice-Admiral
- Commands: Channel Fleet; Commander-in-Chief, East Indies; HMS Achilles; Cape of Good Hope Station; HMS Devastation; HMS Basilisk; HMS Rinaldo; HMS Viper
- Conflicts: Second Anglo-Burmese War; Crimean War; Mahdist War; Abyssinian War
- Awards: Victoria Cross; Knight Commander of the Order of the Bath; Knight Commander of the Order of the Star of India; Knight of the Legion of Honour (France); Order of the Medjidie, Second Class (Ottoman Empire); Silver Medal of Military Valor (Sardinia)

Vice-Admiral Sir William Nathan Wrighte Hewett, VC, KCB, KCSI (12 August 1834 – 13 May 1888) was a Royal Navy officer and a recipient of the Victoria Cross, the highest award for gallantry in the face of the enemy that can be awarded to British and Commonwealth forces. The Hewett Treaty is named after him.

== Early life and Crimean War ==
Hewett was born at Brighton on 12 August 1834 to William Hewett, physician to King William IV. William Hewett was the son of William Nathan Wright Hewett of Bilham Hall, near Doncaster, a once wealthy landowner who lost the majority of his fortune to horse-racing and had to leave the country for Calcutta. Hewett's uncles included Sir Prescott Gardner Hewett, 1st Bt., John Short Hewett and Dr Cornwallis Hewett. He entered the Royal Navy in 1847, and served as a midshipman in the Second Anglo-Burmese War. In 1854, while acting mate of HMS Beagle, he was attached to the Naval Brigade during the Siege of Sevastopol during the Crimean War.

Hewett was in charge of the Right Lancaster Battery at Sevastopol on 26 October 1854. The battery was being threatened by the enemy and, through a misunderstanding, he was ordered to spike his gun and retreat. Disregarding the order, Hewett pulled down the parapet of the battery and with the assistance of some soldiers slewed his gun round and poured on the advancing enemy a most destructive and effectual fire. On 5 November, at the Battle of Inkerman, he again acted with great bravery. For these two actions, he was given the rank of acting lieutenant and later awarded the Victoria Cross, one of the first ever awarded. Hewett's promotion was made official after passing his examinations at Portsmouth; he was subsequently appointed to the royal yacht, from which he was promoted to commander on 13 September 1858.

== Senior commands ==
Hewett's other commands included HMS Viper, HMS Rinaldo and, following his promotion to captain on 24 November 1862, HMS Basilisk as flag-captain to Sir Henry Kellett. He was then captain of HMS Devastation from 1872 to 1873. He was Commander-in-Chief, Cape of Good Hope and West Coast of Africa, in charge of naval operations during the Third Anglo-Ashanti War, from 1873. For his services during this conflict, he was made a Knight Commander of the Order of the Bath on 31 March 1874. He commanded HMS Achilles from 1877 until he was drawn into service in the Mahdist War. In 1882 he was appointed Commander-in-Chief, East Indies. Following the British defeat at El Teb, Hewett commanded the naval brigade that landed at Suakin on 6 February 1884, and was appointed governor of Sudan on 10 February by Baker Pasha.

In April 1884, Hewett led a delegation to Emperor Yohannes IV which negotiated, in exchange for free transit of guns and ammunition through Massawa, access through Ethiopian territory for the successful evacuation of the Egyptian garrisons that had been isolated in southern Sudan by the revolt of Muhammad Ahmad (also known as the Mahdi) against the Egyptian rulers. From May 1885 to July 1885 he was .

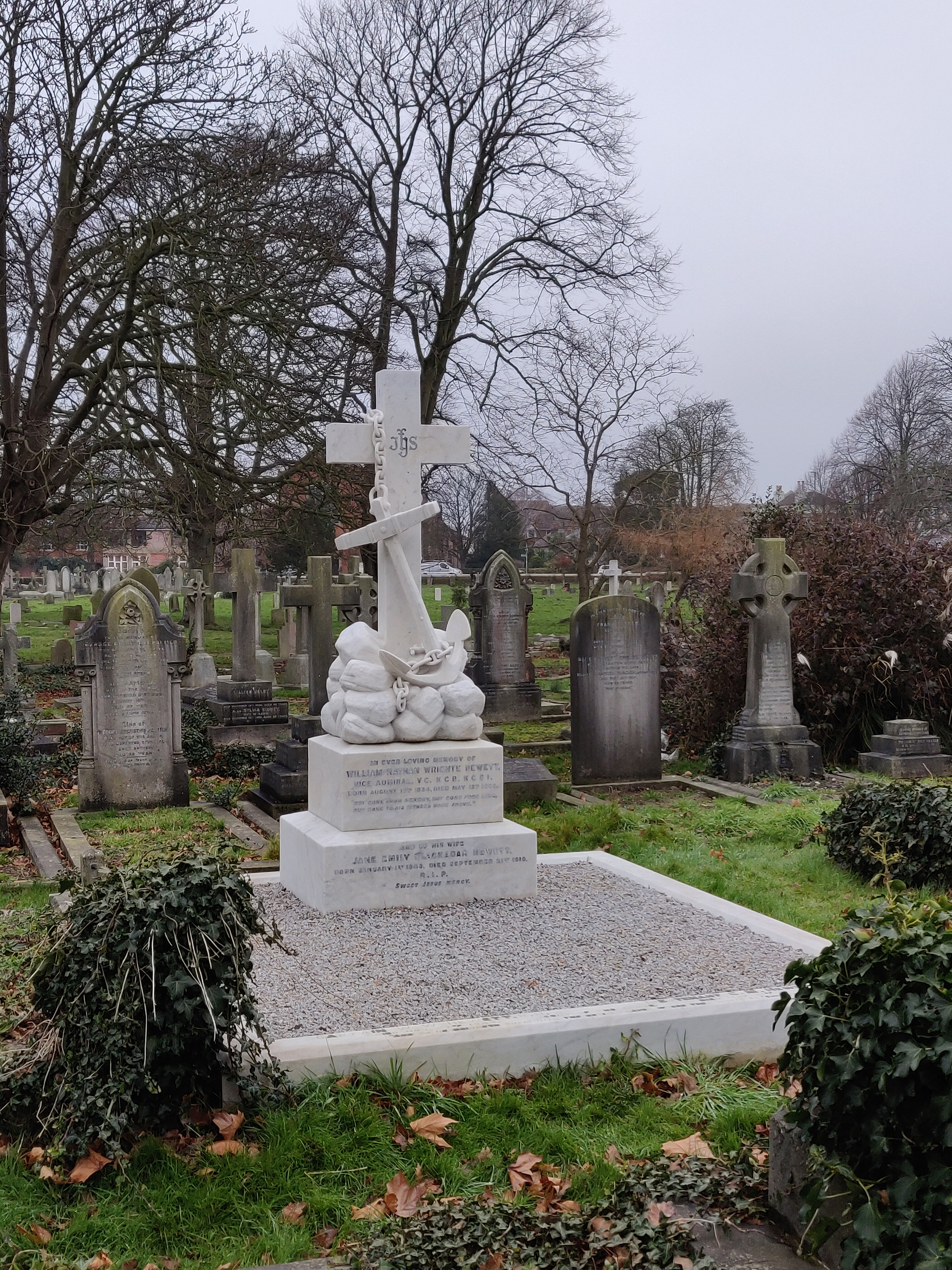
Grave of William Hewett

After his return from Ethiopia, Hewett was appointed Junior Naval Lord and, on 8 July 1884, was promoted to vice admiral. From March 1886 to April 1888 he was in command of the Channel Fleet; however, his delicate health worsened and he died shortly after his retirement.

Hewett's Victoria Cross is displayed at the National Maritime Museum in Greenwich, London.

== Notes ==
Military offices
Preceded by Sir John Commerell	Commander-in-Chief, Cape of Good Hope Station; 1873–1876	Succeeded by Sir Francis Sullivan
Preceded by William Jones	Commander-in-Chief, East Indies; 1882–1885	Succeeded by Sir Frederick Richards
Preceded by Sir Frederick Richards	Junior Naval Lord; 1885	Succeeded by William Codrington
Preceded by Charles Fellowes	Commander-in-Chief, Channel Fleet; 1886–1888	Succeeded by Sir John Baird
