= George Hayley Hewett =

British Royal Naval Admiral

Rear-Admiral George Hayley Hewett CIE ADC
- Born: George Hayley Hewett; 12 November 1855; Catsfield, East Sussex
- Died: 7 October 1930 (aged 74); Alverstoke, Hampshire
- Relatives: John Hewett (father)
- Military career
- Allegiance: United Kingdom
- Branch: Royal Navy
- Rank: Rear-Admiral
- Commands: Director of the Royal Indian Marine
- Conflicts: Anglo-Zulu War
- Awards: Order of the Star of India

George Hayley Hewett, CIE (12 November 1855 – 7 October 1930) was a British naval officer in the Royal Indian Navy who rose to become Director of the Royal Indian Marine. Hewett was also the brother of the colonial administrator and Member of Parliament, Sir John Prescott Hewett.

== Early life ==
Hewett was born in Catsfield, Sussex, the son of Rev. John Hewett, then curate of Battle, East Sussex and later Vicar of Babbacombe, and his wife, Anna Louisa Lyster Hammon, daughter of Capt. William Hammon of the East India Company Navy, and the younger brother of Sir John Prescott Hewett. He went to prep school in Lancing, West Sussex and entered the Royal Navy 1869.

== Naval career ==
Following his entry into the Navy in 1869, Hewett was promoted to the rank of Lieutenant on 30 December 1879 whilst serving in the Anglo-Zulu War for which he received the Zulu War Medal. He was aboard HMS Bonetta for the Jubilee Manoeuvres in the summer of 1887. In 1889 he was appointed commander of HMS Pigmy where he served until 1893 at which point he was appointed Captain of the gunboat HMS Magpie. He was then promoted to the rank of Commander on 30 June 1893. He commanded the torpedo cruiser HMS Racoon on the East Indies Station from 1897 through 1899, when he was promoted to the rank of Captain. As a captain, he commanded the coast defence Breastwork monitor HMS Magdala, which was then at Bombay.

In 1904 he was appointed Director of the Royal Indian Marine, a position in which he served until 1908 at which point he retired as a rear-admiral and was appointed Commander of the Order of the Star of India.

== Family ==
On 11 March 1895 Hewett married Elanthea Leonora Grant, daughter of Charles Coote Grant of the Bedfordshire and Hertfordshire Regiment, a descendant of Sir Charles Coote. Hewett and Grant had one daughter together, Genevieve Felicia Hewett.

Elanthea died in 1914, however Hewett lived another 16 years, dying on 7 October 1930 in Alverstoke, Hampshire.
