= List of Guggenheim Fellowships awarded in 1957 =

Three hundred and forty-four scholars and artists were awarded a total of $1,500,000 Guggenheim Fellowships in 1957.

== 1957 U. S. and Canadian Fellows ==
Category	Field of Study	Fellow	Institutional association	Research topic	Notes	Ref
Creative Arts	Fiction	Holger Cahill		Novel writing		
Creative Arts	Fiction	Alfred Chester		Novel writing	Also won in 1967	
Creative Arts	Fiction	Lucy Daniels		Novel writing		
Creative Arts	Fiction	Borden Deal		Novel writing		
Creative Arts	Fiction	Herbert Gold	State University of Iowa	Novel writing		
Creative Arts	Fiction	Robert Conroy Goldston		Novel writing		
Creative Arts	Fiction	Roger Lemelin		Novel writing	Also won in 1946	
Creative Arts	Fiction	Byron Herbert Reece	Young Harris College	Novel writing	Also won in 1952	
Creative Arts	Fiction	Mary Lee Settle		Novel writing	Also won in 1960	
Creative Arts	Fiction	Adele Wiseman		Novel writing		
Creative Arts	Fine Arts	William Barnett	Philadelphia Museum School of Art	Painting		
Creative Arts	Fine Arts	Frederick G. Becker	St. Louis School of Fine Arts	Printmaking		
Creative Arts	Fine Arts	Virgil David Cantini	University of Pittsburgh	Creative design in enamels		
Creative Arts	Fine Arts	Carmen Cicero	Roselle Park High School	Painting	Also won in 1963	
Creative Arts	Fine Arts	Robert Aaron Frame	Pasadena School of Fine Arts	Painting		
Creative Arts	Fine Arts	Paul Theodore Granlund	Minneapolis School of Art	Sculpture	Also won in 1958	
Creative Arts	Fine Arts	Dimitri Hadzi		Sculpture		
Creative Arts	Fine Arts	Barbara Hult Lekberg	University of the Arts in Philadelphia	Sculpture	Also won in 1959	
Creative Arts	Fine Arts	Max Loehr	University of Michigan			
Creative Arts	Fine Arts	Joseph S. Sheppard	Dickinson College	Painting		
Creative Arts	Music Composition	Dominick Argento	University of Minnesota	Composing	Also won in 1964	
Creative Arts	Music Composition	Mark Bucci		Composing	Also won in 1953	
Creative Arts	Music Composition	Chou Wen-chung	Columbia University	Composing	Also won in 1959	
Creative Arts	Music Composition	Jacob Druckman		Composing	Also won in 1968	
Creative Arts	Music Composition	Earl George	Syracuse University	Composing		
Creative Arts	Music Composition	Peggy Glanville-Hicks		Composing	Also won in 1955	
Creative Arts	Music Composition	Edmund Thomas Haines	Sarah Lawrence College	Composing	Also won in 1956	
Creative Arts	Music Composition	Attilio Joseph Macero	TEO Productions	Composing	Also won in 1958	
Creative Arts	Music Composition	Ned Rorem		Composing	Also won in 1978	
Creative Arts	Music Composition	Robert Starer	Juilliard School	Composing	Also won in 1963	
Creative Arts	Music Composition	Gregory Tucker	Massachusetts Institute of Technology	Composing		
Creative Arts	Music Composition	David Van Vactor	University of Tennessee, Knoxville	Composing		
Creative Arts	Music Composition	Stanley Wolfe	Juilliard School	Interpretive dance number King's Heart		
Creative Arts	Photography	John Collier Jr.		Uses of photography in social sciences		
Creative Arts	Photography	W. Eugene Smith			Also won in 1956, 1968	
Creative Arts	Poetry	Paul Hamilton Engle	University of Iowa	Writing	Also won in 1953, 1959	
Creative Arts	Poetry	Marcia Nardi		Writing		
Creative Arts	Poetry	Alastair Reid		Writing	Also won in 1958	
Creative Arts	Poetry	Jonathan C. Williams		Recording annals and writing the archaeology and other phases of the Etowah Indian Mounds from the poet's point of view		
Humanities	American Literature	Curtis Dahl	Wheaton College	19th century archaeological discoveries in relation to the cultural history of the West		
Humanities	American Literature	Charles Andrew Fenton	Yale University	Completion of previously started biography about Stephen Vincent Benét		
Humanities	American Literature	Robert Clay Humphrey	University of North Carolina, Greensboro	Role of the poet in mid-century America		
Humanities	American Literature	Henry Dan Piper	California Institute of Technology			
Humanities	American Literature	Walter B. Rideout	Northwestern University			
Humanities	American Literature	Louis Decimus Rubin Jr.	Richmond News Leader	Key themes and formal concepts in the literature of the South		
Humanities	American Literature	Albert Douglass Van Nostrand	Brown University			
Humanities	American Literature	Richard Walser	North Carolina State College	Regional basis of literary interpretations of the South		
Humanities	Architecture, Planning and Design	W. Burlie Brown	Tulane University	American architectural thought and expression, 1865-1914		
Humanities	Architecture, Planning and Design	William Bell Dinsmoor				
Humanities	Architecture, Planning and Design	Allan Bernard Temko	San Francisco Chronicle, University of California, Berkeley	Architecture on the West Coast of the United States		
Humanities	Bibliography	Ernst Maximilian Posner	American University	History of archives administration		
Humanities	Biography	Flora Anne Armitage				
Humanities	Biography	Karl J. R. Arndt	Clark University			
Humanities	Biography	Laura Fermi		Benito Mussolini		
Humanities	British History	Joseph O. Baylen	Delta State College	W. T. Stead		
Humanities	British History	John Leonard Clive	Harvard University	Transition from 18th to 19th century thought and opinion in England		
Humanities	British History	Paul H. Hardacre	Vanderbilt University	Edward Hyde, 1st Earl of Clarendon		
Humanities	British History	J. Jean Hecht	Haverford College	The upper-class family in 18th century England		
Humanities	British History	Gustave Lanctot	Ottawa University		Also won in 1956	
Humanities	British History	Arthur J. Marder	University of Hawaii	English seapower in the 20th century	Also won in 1941, 1946	
Humanities	Classics	Darrell Arlynn Amyx	University of California, Berkeley	Greek vase painting	Also won in 1973	
Humanities	Classics	George Eckel Duckworth	Princeton University	Virgil as the poet of Augustan Rome		
Humanities	Classics	Demetrius J. Georgacas	University of North Dakota		Also won in 1964	
Humanities	Classics	Philip Levine	Harvard University			
Humanities	Classics	Paul Lachlan MacKendrick	University of Wisconsin	Roman colonization in the Republican period		
Humanities	Classics	John Brodie McDiarmid	University of Washington			
Humanities	Classics	Lionel Pearson	Stanford University	Popular ethics in ancient Greece		
Humanities	Classics	Wilson Gerson Rabinowitz	University of California, Berkeley	Certain writings by Aristotle		
Humanities	Classics	Renata von Scheliha		Musical and poetical contests of the Greeks		
Humanities	Classics	Herbert Chayyim Youtie	University of Michigan	Scholarly use of papyrological literature		
Humanities	East Asian Studies	Shih-Hsiang Chen	University of California, Berkeley	Historical study of Chinese literature		
Humanities	East Asian Studies	James Robert Hightower	Harvard University			
Humanities	East Asian Studies	Emanuel Sarkisyanz	Bishop College	Buddhist influence on Burmese social thought		
Humanities	East Asian Studies	Robert Shafer	University of California	Sino-Tibetan languages		
Humanities	English Literature	Donald Lemen Clark			Also won in 1944	
Humanities	English Literature	Arthur Morse Eastman	University of Michigan	Suspended judgement in Shakespeare's plays		
Humanities	English Literature	Thomas Cary Duncan Eaves	University of Arkansas	Samuel Richardson		
Humanities	English Literature	Richard David Ellmann	Northwestern University		Also won in 1949, 1970	
Humanities	English Literature	Arthur Friedman	University of Chicago	18th century literature		
Humanities	English Literature	Donald Johnson Greene	University of California, Riverside	Relation between English literature and politics in the 18th century	Also won in 1979	
Humanities	English Literature	Bruce Harkness	University of Illinois at Urbana-Champaign	Influence of certain English publishing firms on authors in the 20th century		
Humanities	English Literature	Benjamin B. Hoover	University of Washington	Relationship of literature and politics in 18th century England		
Humanities	English Literature	Richard Meredith Hosley	University of Missouri	Elizabethan stage and methods of presenting plays		
Humanities	English Literature	John Henderson Long	Morehead State College	Shakespeare's use of performed music in his plays		
Humanities	English Literature	Thomas Francis Parkinson	University of California, Berkeley	Later poetry by William Butler Yeats		
Humanities	English Literature	Fannie Elizabeth Ratchford	University of Texas	19th century literary forgeries	Also won in 1929, 1937	
Humanities	English Literature	Irving Ribner	Tulane University	Shakespeare's growth and development as a writer of tragedy		
Humanities	English Literature	William Andrew Ringler Jr.	Washington University in St. Louis	Complete poetical works of Sir Philip Sidney; history of Tudor poetry	Also won in 1947	
Humanities	English Literature	Robert Wentworth Rogers	University of Illinois at Urbana-Champaign	Alexander Pope		
Humanities	English Literature	Eleanor Rosenberg	Barnard College	Literature in the New World as known in Tudor England		
Humanities	English Literature	John Calhoun Stephens Jr.	Emory University	Richard Steele and Joseph Addison as editors of The Guardian		
Humanities	English Literature	Wilfred Healey Stone	Stanford University	E. M. Forster	Also won in 1967	
Humanities	English Literature	Alvin Whitley	University of Wisconsin	Victorian popular poetry		
Humanities	Fine Arts Research	Alfred Neumeyer	Mills College	Naturalistic elements in medieval art		
Humanities	Fine Arts Research	John Goldsmith Phillips	Metropolitan Museum	Works of Andrea del Verrocchio and the young Leonardo da Vinci		
Humanities	Fine Arts Research	Benjamin Rowland Jr.	Harvard University			
Humanities	Fine Arts Research	Aline B. Saarinen	The New York Times			
Humanities	Fine Arts Research	Pauline Simmons				
Humanities	Folklore and Popular Culture	George Korson	Pennsylvania Folklore Society	Anthracite region		
Humanities	Folklore and Popular Culture	David Park McAllester	Wesleyan University	Navajo ceremonial chants		
Humanities	Folklore and Popular Culture	Donald Knight Wilgus	Western Kentucky University	History of the Anglo-American ballad since 1898		
Humanities	French Literature	Joel Colton	Duke University	Léon Blum and French Socialism		
Humanities	French Literature	Carl Albert Viggiani	Wesleyan University	Works by Albert Camus		
Humanities	French Literature	Konrad Ferdinand Bieber	Connecticut College	Contemporary Franco-German literary relations		
Humanities	French Literature	Durand Echeverria	Brown University	Meaning of liberty in French thought of the 18th century		
Humanities	French Literature	Oscar Alfred Haac	Emory University	French novel of the 18th century		
Humanities	French Literature	Armand Hoog	Princeton University			
Humanities	French Literature	Georges J. Joyaux	Michigan State University	Influence of North African writers on contemporary French letters		
Humanities	French Literature	Félix-Antoine Savard				
Humanities	French Literature	Laurence Wylie	Haverford College	Attitudes and values of villages in two contrasting regions of rural France		
Humanities	German and East European History	Klemens von Klemperer	Smith College	Alternatives to the Anschluss of Austria		
Humanities	German and Scandinavian Literature	Robert Livingston Beare				
Humanities	German and Scandinavian Literature	Sigurd Burckhardt	Ohio State University	Comparative study of the dramatic poetry of Shakespeare and Goethe		
Humanities	German and Scandinavian Literature	Walter G. Johnson	University of Washington	Research in Stockholm	Also won in 1964	
Humanities	German and Scandinavian Literature	James Woodrow Marchand	Washington University in St. Louis	Dating Old High German and Gothic manuscripts		
Humanities	German and Scandinavian Literature	André von Gronicka	Columbia University		Also won in 1969	
Humanities	German and Scandinavian Literature	Werner Vordtriede	University of Wisconsin	Conception of the poet in German Romanticism		
Humanities	History of Science and Technology	Giorgio Diaz de Santillana	Massachusetts Institute of Technology	Vincenzio Viviani		
Humanities	Iberian and Latin American History	Ernest Joseph Burrus	St. Louis University	Documents in Italian archives bearing on Latin American history		
Humanities	Iberian and Latin American History	Joseph Newman				
Humanities	Iberian and Latin American History	Watt Stewart	New York State College for Teachers	Business activities of Minor Cooper Keith in Costa Rica		
Humanities	Intellectual and Cultural History	Walter M. Simon	Cornell University	History of European positivism in the 19th century		
Humanities	Intellectual and Cultural History	Gertrude Himmelfarb		Development of Darwin's thought and of contemporary response to his work	Also won in 1955	
Humanities	Intellectual and Cultural History	Frank Edward Manuel	Brandeis University	Mythology and primitive religion in 18th century thought		
Humanities	Literary Criticism	Meyer H. Abrams	Cornell University		Also won in 1960	
Humanities	Literary Criticism	John Jacob Enck	University of Wisconsin	Restoration comedy		
Humanities	Literary Criticism	Martin Price	Yale University	Ideas of order in representative 18th century English writers	Also won in 1971	
Humanities	Literary Criticism	Wilbur Samuel Howell	Princeton University	Theories of logic and rhetoric in 18th century England	Also won in 1948	
Humanities	Literary Criticism	Joseph Holmes Summers	University of Connecticut	Milton's Paradise Lost		
Humanities	Medieval Literature	Albert B. Friedman	Harvard University		Also won in 1965	
Humanities	Medieval Literature	Paul Murray Kendall	Ohio University	Warwick the Kingmaker	Also won in 1961	
Humanities	Medieval Literature	Durant Waite Robertson Jr.	Princeton University	Poetry of Chaucer in the light of medieval tradition		
Humanities	Music Research	Karl J. Geiringer	Boston University			
Humanities	Music Research	Hans Nathan	Michigan State University	Italian instrumental ensemble music of the early 17th century		
Humanities	Music Research	Walter H. Rubsamen	University of California, Los Angeles	15th century Italian vocal music	Also won in 1947	
Humanities	Music Research	Eric Werner	Hebrew Union College-Jewish Institute of Religion	Liturgy and their influence on the history of church and synagogue music		
Humanities	Near Eastern Studies	George Makdisi	University of Michigan	History of Islamic socio-religious movements in the 11th century	Also won in 1966	
Humanities	Near Eastern Studies	Jacob J. Rabinowitz	Hebrew University			
Humanities	Near Eastern Studies	Arthur Võõbus	Chicago Lutheran Theological Seminary	Syrian monasticism from the 2nd to the 5th century, A.D.	Also won in 1958, 1968	
Humanities	Philosophy	Lewis White Beck	University of Rochester	Immanuel Kant's ethical theory		
Humanities	Philosophy	Burton Spencer Dreben	Harvard University			
Humanities	Philosophy	William Bernard Peach	Duke University	Richard Price and British moral philosophy		
Humanities	Religion	Ralph Harper	Bard College		Also won in 1965	
Humanities	Religion	John Thomas McNeill	Union Theological Seminary	Works of John Calvin		
Humanities	Renaissance History	Franklin Dickey	University of Oregon	The concept of 'the learned poet' in Renaissance England		
Humanities	Renaissance History	Paul O. Kristeller	Columbia University	Philosophical and humanistic manuscripts of the Renaissance from the 14th to the 16th centuries	Also won in 1968	
Humanities	Russian History	Marc Raeff	Clark University	The nobility's relationships to the Russian state, 1725-1861	Also won in 1987	
Humanities	Science Writing	Donald Greame Kelley				
Humanities	Slavic Literature	Victor Erlich	University of Washington	Research in London and Bristol	Also won in 1964, 1976	
Humanities	Slavic Literature	Olga Scherer	Yale University	Russian short story		
Humanities	Spanish and Portuguese Literature	Carlos Blanco Aguinaga	Ohio State University	Literary style of Miguel de Unamuno		
Humanities	Spanish and Portuguese Literature	Sherman Hinkle Eoff	Washington University in St. Louis	Philosophic attitudes of 19th and 20th century novels, with particular emphasis on the emotional impact of modern science on the literary mind		
Humanities	Spanish and Portuguese Literature	Vicente Llorens	Princeton University	Blanco White		
Humanities	Spanish and Portuguese Literature	Juan López-Morillas	Brown University	Intellectual history of modern Spain	Also won in 1950	
Humanities	Spanish and Portuguese Literature	Juan Marichal	Bryn Mawr College	Manuel Azaña	Also won in 1972	
Humanities	Spanish and Portuguese Literature	Walter T. Pattison	University of Minnesota			
Humanities	United States History	Robert V. Bruce	Boston University	1877 railroad strikes and labor riots in the USA		
Humanities	United States History	Lyman Henry Butterfield	Harvard University			
Humanities	United States History	Louis L. Gerson	University of Connecticut	Impact of American immigrant groups on US foreign policies		
Humanities	United States History	Robert V. Hine	University of California, Riverside	Edward, Richard, and Benjamin Kern	Also won in 1967	
Humanities	United States History	William Turrentine Jackson	University of California, Davis	British contributions to the development of the American West	Also won in 1964	
Humanities	United States History	Weymouth Tyree Jordan	Florida State University	Scientific agriculture in the Old South		
Humanities	United States History	Aubrey Christian Land	University of Nebraska	The merchant-planter class of the Chesapeake Colonies		
Humanities	United States History	Robert Alexander Lively	Princeton University	Herbert Hoover and the American enterprise		
Humanities	United States History	Richard Lowitt	Connecticut College	George W. Norris		
Humanities	United States History	Andrew Forest Muir	Polytechnic Institute (Puerto Rico), Rice Institute	William Marsh Rice		
Humanities	United States History	Bessie Louise Pierce	University of Chicago	History of the city of Chicago	Also won in 1955	
Humanities	United States History	Frederick Rudolph	Williams College	History of higher education in the USA	Also won in 1968	
Humanities	United States History	Helen C. Shugg		The part played by the search for health in westward migration in the USA		
Humanities	United States History	Alice Elizabeth Smith	Wisconsin State Historical Society	Scottish leadership and capital in the development of the lower Lake Michigan area in the 19th century		
Humanities	United States History	George Brown Tindall	Louisiana State University	History of the South, 1913-1946		
Humanities	United States History	John Chalmers Vinson	University of Georgia	US Senate and American foreign policy, 1931-1941		
Humanities	United States History	Bell Irvin Wiley	Emory University	History of the Confederate States of America, 1861-1865		
Natural Science	Applied Mathematics	Ronold W. P. King	Harvard University	Antennae and ultra-high frequency phenomena	Also won in 1937	
Natural Science	Applied Mathematics	Geoffrey Stuart Stephen Ludford	University of Maryland	Mathematical theory of compressible flow		
Natural Science	Applied Mathematics	Shih-I Pai	University of Maryland	Fluid dynamics of high-speed and high-temperature gas flows		
Natural Science	Applied Mathematics	William Prager	Brown University			
Natural Science	Applied Mathematics	Shan-Fu Shen	University of Maryland	Hydrodynamic stability		
Natural Science	Applied Mathematics	Armand Siegel	Boston University	Problems of applied statistical mechanics		
Natural Science	Astronomy and Astrophysics	Masahisa Sugiura	University of Alaska	Solar influences on the Earth's upper atmosphere		
Natural Science	Chemistry	Robert Byron Bird	University of Wisconsin-Madison	Applications of equations of change to engineering		
Natural Science	Chemistry	Gordon M. Barrow	Northwestern University	Electronic structure of certain functional groups		
Natural Science	Chemistry	Gunnar Bror Bergman	California Institute of Technology			
Natural Science	Chemistry	Warren William Brandt	Purdue University	Certain aspects of gas chromatography		
Natural Science	Chemistry	Norman Henry Cromwell	University of Nebraska	Organic reaction mechanisms	Also won in 1950	
Natural Science	Chemistry	Victor R. Deitz	United States Naval Research Laboratory			
Natural Science	Chemistry	Renato Dulbecco	California Institute of Technology			
Natural Science	Chemistry	Paul Stephen Farrington	University of California, Los Angeles			
Natural Science	Chemistry	Harold Leo Friedman	University of California, Los Angeles			
Natural Science	Chemistry	Garman Harbottle	Brookhaven National Laboratory	Chemical consequences of nuclear transformation in certain crystalline solids		
Natural Science	Chemistry	Edward L. King	University of Wisconsin	Kinetics and mechanisms of chemical reactions in solution		
Natural Science	Chemistry	David Emerson Mann	National Bureau of Standards	Nature and origin of potential barriers hindering internal rotation in molecules		
Natural Science	Chemistry	Foil A. Miller	Mellon Institute	Nuclear magnetic resonance		
Natural Science	Chemistry	Rollie John Myers Jr.	University of California, Berkeley	Chemical reactions of radicals, atoms and ions		
Natural Science	Chemistry	Martin A. Paul	Harpur College	Kinetics and mechanisms of nitration reactions in the solvent acetic anhydride		
Natural Science	Chemistry	Raymond Pepinsky	Pennsylvania State University	Crystal design of salts of complex and organic ions		
Natural Science	Chemistry	Lloyd Hilton Reyerson	University of Minnesota		Also won in 1927	
Natural Science	Chemistry	Ernest Haywood Swift	California Institute of Technology			
Natural Science	Chemistry	Bernard Weinstock	Argonne National Laboratory	Thermodynamic properties of liquid Helium-3-Helium-4 mixtures		
Natural Science	Chemistry	John Edward Wertz	University of Minnesota	Interactions of unpaired electron systems with their environment in the solid state		
Natural Science	Chemistry	George Landis Zimmerman	Bryn Mawr College			
Natural Science	Earth Science	Jacob A. Bjerknes	University of California, Los Angeles			
Natural Science	Earth Science	John Edwin Brush	Rutgers University	Land use and settlement in Old Piscataway Township, New Jersey		
Natural Science	Earth Science	Don Kirkham	Iowa State University	Fertility of intensely cultivated soils of Belgium		
Natural Science	Earth Science	Merle Charles Prunty Jr.	University of Georgia	Effect of contemporary occupance forms on plantation landholdings in the South		
Natural Science	Earth Science	Howel Williams	University of California, Berkeley	Central American and the West Indian volcanoes	Also won in 1949	
Natural Science	Engineering	Diogenes James Angelakos	University of California, Berkeley	Electromagnetic radiation from regions filled with anisotropic materials		
Natural Science	Engineering	Edward Walter Comings	Purdue University	High pressure technology; European education in chemical engineering		
Natural Science	Engineering	Ladislas Goldstein	University of Illinois at Urbana-Champaign	High energy condensed discharges in the heavy rare gases		
Natural Science	Engineering	André Laurent Jorissen	Cornell University			
Natural Science	Engineering	Erik Leonard Mollo-Christensen	Massachusetts Institute of Technology	Unsteady aerodynamics		
Natural Science	Engineering	Herbert Mark Neustadt	U.S. Naval Academy		Also won in 1956	
Natural Science	Engineering	George William Preckshot	University of Minnesota			
Natural Science	Engineering	Stanley Eugene Rauch	University of California, Santa Barbara	Certain characteristics of systems of nonlinear differential equations		
Natural Science	Engineering	Paul Southworth Symonds	Brown University			
Natural Science	Engineering	Mahinder S. Uberoi	University of Michigan	Turbulent motion of fluids		
Natural Science	Geography and Environmental Studies	Robert Eric Dickinson	Syracuse University			
Natural Science	Mathematics	William Werner Boone	Catholic University		Also won in 1977	
Natural Science	Mathematics	Charles L. Dolph	University of Michigan	Partial differential equations as they occur in the applied mathematical fields of scattering and fluid mechanisms		
Natural Science	Mathematics	Harish-Chandra	Institute for Advanced Study	Research in Paris		
Natural Science	Mathematics	Orville Goodwin Harrold Jr.	University of Tennessee	Three-dimensional topologies		
Natural Science	Mathematics	Kenkichi Iwasawa	Massachusetts Institute of Technology			
Natural Science	Mathematics	George Daniel Mostow	Johns Hopkins University	Compact Lie transformation groups		
Natural Science	Mathematics	Jerzy Neyman	University of California, Berkeley	Statistical studies toward a theory of the spatial distribution of galaxies		
Natural Science	Mathematics	Erich Rothe	University of Michigan			
Natural Science	Mathematics	Leo Reino Sario	University of California, Los Angeles			
Natural Science	Medicine and Health	Herbert Leon Borison	University of Utah	Forebrain and hindbrain structures in the regulation of visceral activities		
Natural Science	Medicine and Health	Averill Abraham Liebow	Yale University School of Medicine	Pathophysiology of pulmonary circulation		
Natural Science	Medicine and Health	Frederick Sargent, II	University of Illinois at Urbana-Champaign	Physiological mechanisms of sweat gland fatigue		
Natural Science	Molecular and Cellular Biology	Christian B. Anfinsen Jr.	National Institutes of Health			
Natural Science	Molecular and Cellular Biology	Jay Vern Beck	Brigham Young University	Methods of isolation and mass propagation of iron-oxidizing bacteria		
Natural Science	Molecular and Cellular Biology	Edward George Boettiger	University of Connecticut	Insect flight muscle		
Natural Science	Molecular and Cellular Biology	Ernest Borek	City College of New York		Also won in 1950	
Natural Science	Molecular and Cellular Biology	Jefferson M. Crismon	Stanford University	Mechanisms of inactivation of certain amines in peripheral blood vessels		
Natural Science	Molecular and Cellular Biology	Thomas Timothy Crocker	University of California, Irvine			
Natural Science	Molecular and Cellular Biology	Tihamer Zoltan Csaky	University of North Carolina	Mechanism of carbohydrate transfers in biological systems		
Natural Science	Molecular and Cellular Biology	Sanford S. Elberg	University of California, Berkeley	Effectiveness of the vaccine developed to prevent Brucella infection in cattle		
Natural Science	Molecular and Cellular Biology	Wilburn John Eversole	University of New Mexico	Endocrine regulation of salt and water metabolism		
Natural Science	Molecular and Cellular Biology	Paul Fredric Fenton	Brown University	Stephen Vincent Benét		
Natural Science	Molecular and Cellular Biology	Halvor Orin Halvorson	University of Illinois at Urbana-Champaign	Studies of micro-organisms important in food microbiology		
Natural Science	Molecular and Cellular Biology	John William Kelly	Medical College of Virginia	Use of micro-spectrophotometry	Also won in 1960	
Natural Science	Molecular and Cellular Biology	Richard Fuller Kimball	Oak Ridge National Laboratory	Nucleic acid and protein content of parts of the protozoan cell		
Natural Science	Molecular and Cellular Biology	Irvin E. Liener	University of Minnesota			
Natural Science	Molecular and Cellular Biology	Boris Magasanik	Harvard University			
Natural Science	Molecular and Cellular Biology	Harry Wilbur Seeley Jr.	Cornell University			
Natural Science	Molecular and Cellular Biology	Alvin Ferner Sellers	University of Minnesota	Nervous mechanisms regulating stomach functions; absorptive mechanisms in the intestines		
Natural Science	Molecular and Cellular Biology	Martin Sonenberg	Cornell University Medical College			
Natural Science	Molecular and Cellular Biology	David B. Sprinson	Columbia University Vagelos College of Physicians and Surgeons			
Natural Science	Molecular and Cellular Biology	Mortimer Paul Starr	University of California, Davis	Plant disease bacteria	Also won in 1968	
Natural Science	Molecular and Cellular Biology	Kenneth V. Thimann	Harvard University		Also won in 1950	
Natural Science	Molecular and Cellular Biology	Oscar Touster	Vanderbilt University School of Medicine	Metabolism and biochemistry of sub-cellular particles		
Natural Science	Molecular and Cellular Biology	Robert Philip Wagner	University of Texas	Genetic control of metabolism		
Natural Science	Molecular and Cellular Biology	Philip E. Wilcox	University of Washington	Fundamental studies on proteins		
Natural Science	Molecular and Cellular Biology	Cecil Edmund Yarwood	University of California, Berkeley	Acquired immunity to virus infections in plants		
Natural Science	Organismic Biology and Ecology	George Anastos	University of Maryland	Ticks found on reptiles		
Natural Science	Organismic Biology and Ecology	John Tyler Bonner	Princeton University	Role of cell variations in the development of cellular slime molds	Also won in 1971	
Natural Science	Organismic Biology and Ecology	Arthur Merton Chickering	Albion College	Taxonomy of spiders	Also won in 1958	
Natural Science	Organismic Biology and Ecology	Louie Irby Davis		Songs and calls of Mexican birds		
Natural Science	Organismic Biology and Ecology	Paul Lester Errington	Iowa State College	Periodic cycles in vertebrate populations		
Natural Science	Organismic Biology and Ecology	George Evelyn Hutchinson	Yale University	Biological limnology	Also won in 1949	
Natural Science	Organismic Biology and Ecology	Karl Frank Lagler	University of Michigan			
Natural Science	Organismic Biology and Ecology	Alden H. Miller	University of California, Berkeley	Breeding activity of birds at equatorial latitudes		
Natural Science	Organismic Biology and Ecology	John Luther Mohr	University of California, Los Angeles			
Natural Science	Organismic Biology and Ecology	Val Nolan Jr.	Indiana University	Northern Prairie Warbler and marketable title to land		
Natural Science	Organismic Biology and Ecology	Donald Frederick Poulson	Yale University	Comparative biology of copper accumulation in animals		
Natural Science	Organismic Biology and Ecology	Albert Glenn Richards	University of Minnesota			
Natural Science	Organismic Biology and Ecology	Bradley T. Scheer	University of Oregon	Isolation of crustacean hormones		
Natural Science	Organismic Biology and Ecology	Frank John Vernberg	Duke University	Activity and metabolism of marine animals at various temperatures		
Natural Science	Organismic Biology and Ecology	Charles Edward Wilde Jr.	University of Pennsylvania	Biochemical mechanisms of cellular differentiation		
Natural Science	Organismic Biology and Ecology	Walter LeRoy Wilson	University of Vermont College of Medicine	Inhibition of cell division		
Natural Science	Physics	Arnold B. Arons	Amherst College, Woods Hole Oceanographic Institute	Stability and overturn of sea water columns in winter cooling		
Natural Science	Physics	Nicolaas Bloembergen	Harvard University	Nuclear and electron spin magnetic resonance		
Natural Science	Physics	Owen Chamberlain	University of California, Berkeley	Theoretical physics of the fundamental particles		
Natural Science	Physics	Morrel H. Cohen	University of Chicago	Electron theory of alloys		
Natural Science	Physics	Clyde Lorrain Cowan	Los Alamos Laboratory	Physics of the neutrino and its interactions with atomic nuclei		
Natural Science	Physics	Jay Gregory Dash	Los Alamos Laboratory	Critical velocity in liquid Helium-2		
Natural Science	Physics	Robert Briggs Day	Los Alamos Laboratory	Low-lying odd-parity levels in heavy even-even nuclei		
Natural Science	Physics	Claude Geoffrion			Also won in 1958	
Natural Science	Physics	Roy Jay Glauber	Harvard University	Interactions of elementary particles	Also won in 1972	
Natural Science	Physics	Edwin L. Goldwasser	University of Illinois at Urbana-Champaign	Effect of nucleon recoils in photo-meson production		
Natural Science	Physics	Melville Saul Green	National Bureau of Standards	Theoretical researches in statistical mechanics of time-depenedent phenomena	Also won in 1973	
Natural Science	Physics	Dieter Kurath	Argonne National Laboratory	Methods for the calculation of nuclear properties		
Natural Science	Physics	John Selden Kirby-Smith	Oak Ridge National Laboratory	Radiation biology and biophysics		
Natural Science	Physics	Leo Silvio Lavatelli	University of Illinois at Urbana-Champaign	Nature of the interactions of pions with nucleons		
Natural Science	Physics	John Hundale Lawrence				
Natural Science	Physics	Joseph S. Levinger	Louisiana State University	Theory of the nuclear photoelectric effect		
Natural Science	Physics	Ralph Stuart Mackay Jr.	University of California, Berkeley, University of California Medical Center		Also won in 1956	
Natural Science	Physics	Allan Henry Morrish	University of Minnesota	Solid state at low temperatures		
Natural Science	Physics	Lorne Albert Page	University of Pittsburgh	Photons, electrons, and positrons by precision beta ray and gamma ray spectroscopy techniques		
Natural Science	Physics	Robert Vivian Pound	Harvard University	Nuclear moments of short-lived nuclear states	Also won in 1971	
Natural Science	Physics	Frederick Reines	Los Alamos Laboratory	Physics of the neutrino and its interaction with the atomic nucleus		
Natural Science	Physics	Isadore Rudnick	University of California, Los Angeles	Thermoelastic waves in metals at low temperatures		
Natural Science	Physics	Ellis Philip Steinberg	Argonne National Laboratory	Process of nuclear fission		
Natural Science	Plant Science	Enrique Balech	Ministry of the Navy (Argentina)		Also won in 1958	
Natural Science	Plant Science	Lawrence Rogers Blinks	Stanford University	Bioelectric phenomena	Also won in 1939, 1948	
Natural Science	Plant Science	Jules Brunel	University of Montreal			
Natural Science	Plant Science	Alden Springer Crafts	University of California, Davis	Herbicidal chemicals	Also won in 1938	
Natural Science	Plant Science	Emanuel Epstein	University of California			
Natural Science	Plant Science	Donald Sankey Farner	Washington State College	Physiological cycles of birds		
Natural Science	Plant Science	Leslie Andrew Garay	Harvard University			
Natural Science	Plant Science	Charles William Hagen Jr.	Indiana University	Differentiation within plant species		
Natural Science	Plant Science	Leonard Machlis	University of California, Berkeley	Physiology of the water mold Allomyces		
Natural Science	Plant Science	Roy Overstreet	University of California, Berkeley	Mineral absorption by plant and animal cells	Also won in 1945	
Natural Science	Plant Science	Daniel Altman Roberts	University of Florida			
Natural Science	Plant Science	Stanley George Stephens				
Natural Science	Plant Science	Rufus Henney Thompson				
Natural Science	Plant Science	Harry Ernest Wheeler				
Social Sciences	Anthropology and Cultural Studies	Arthur J. O. Anderson	New Mexico Museum of Art	Aztec accounts of Spanish colonization	Also won in 1955	
Social Sciences	Anthropology and Cultural Studies	Ralph Leon Beals	University of California, Los Angeles			
Social Sciences	Anthropology and Cultural Studies	Svend E. Frederiksen			Also won in 1958	
Social Sciences	Anthropology and Cultural Studies	Alfred Vincent Kidder				
Social Sciences	Anthropology and Cultural Studies	Donald Stanley Marshall	Peabody Museum of Salem, Harvard University	Mangaia in Polynesian dialects		
Social Sciences	Anthropology and Cultural Studies	Sidney Wilfred Mintz	Yale University	Haitian internal marketing system		
Social Sciences	Anthropology and Cultural Studies	John Howland Rowe	University of California, Berkeley	Incas during Spanish colonial rule		
Social Sciences	Economics	Arnold C. Harberger	University of Chicago			
Social Sciences	Economics	George Herbert Hildebrand	University of California, Los Angeles		Also won in 1952	
Social Sciences	Economics	Gerald Marvin Meier	Wesleyan University	International trade and economic development in the British tropics, 1870-1914	Also won in 1958	
Social Sciences	Education	Lawrence Arthur Cremin	Teachers College at Columbia University, The Spencer Foundation	History of American educational thought, 1880-1940		
Social Sciences	Education	Alfred Novak	Michigan State University	Teaching of natural science		
Social Sciences	Law	George Lee Haskins	University of Pennsylvania	Early colonial law		
Social Sciences	Law	John O. Honnold Jr.	University of Pennsylvania Law School	Law governing sales of goods under civil law systems		
Social Sciences	Law	Leonard Williams Levy	Brandeis University	Provisions against compulsory self-incrimination in Anglo-American law		
Social Sciences	Law	Arthur Selwyn Miller	Emory University	Domestic goals of modern nation-states in relation to international trade		
Social Sciences	Political Science	George Arthur Codding Jr.	University of Pennsylvania	International postal communication		
Social Sciences	Political Science	Howard Jay Graham	Los Angeles County Law Library	History of the Fourteenth Amendment to the United States Constitution	Also won in 1953	
Social Sciences	Political Science	Lennox Algernon Mills	University of Minnesota		Also won in 1936, 1959	
Social Sciences	Political Science	Theodore Lucien Shay	Willamette University	Hindu principles on current Indian political policy		
Social Sciences	Psychology	Magda B. Arnold	Loyola University, Chicago, Spring Hill College			
Social Sciences	Psychology	Andrew Laurence Comrey Jr.	University of California, Los Angeles			
Social Sciences	Psychology	Herschel Leibowitz	University of Wisconsin	Sensory and neurophysiological correlates of perception		
Social Sciences	Psychology	Richard Lester Solomon	Harvard University			
Social Sciences	Sociology	Leonard Broom	University of California, Los Angeles			
Social Sciences	Sociology	Ronald Freedman	University of Michigan	University of Michigan		
Social Sciences	Sociology	Herbert Hyman	Columbia University	Comparative study of public opinion on civil liberties in the USA and Great Britain		
Social Sciences	Sociology	Marvin Eugene Wolfgang	University of Pennsylvania	Florentine contributions to the history and philosophy of punishment for crime	Also won in 1968	

== 1957 Latin American and Caribbean Fellows ==
Category	Field of Study	Fellow	Institutional association	Research topic	Notes	Ref
Creative Arts	Fine Arts	Epifanio Irizarry	Puerto Rican Division of Community Education	Painting		
Creative Arts	Fine Arts	Antonio Joseph		Painting	Also won in 1953	
Creative Arts	Fine Arts	Julio Rosado del Valle	Puerto Rico Department of Education	Painting		
Creative Arts	Fine Arts	Enrique Echeverría		Painting		
Creative Arts	Music Composition	José Serebrier		Composing	Also won in 1958	
Humanities	Folklore and Popular Culture	Emile Marcelin				
Humanities	History of Science and Technology	Francisco Guerra	Universidad Nacional de México			
Humanities	Iberian and Latin American History	José Miranda González	Universidad Nacional de México		Also won in 1966	
Humanities	Linguistics	John Corominas	University of Chicago		Also won in 1945, 1948	
Natural Science	Earth Science	Horacio Homero Camacho	University of Buenos Aires			
Natural Science	Earth Science	Fernando Vila	YPF			
Natural Science	Mathematics	Leopoldo Nachbin	University of Brazil		Also won in 1949, 1958	
Natural Science	Medicine and Health	Alejandro Arce Queirolo	Asunción Military Hospital			
Natural Science	Medicine and Health	Joaquín Luco Valenzuela			Also won in 1937, 1938, 1968	
Natural Science	Molecular and Cellular Biology	Fernando Mönckeberg Barros	Universidad de Chile			
Natural Science	Molecular and Cellular Biology	Adolfo Max Rothschild	Biological Institute of São Paulo		Also won in 1956	
Natural Science	Organismic Biology and Ecology	Clare R. Baltazar	National Institute of Science and Technology		Also won in 1964	
Natural Science	Organismic Biology and Ecology	Virgilio Biaggi Jr.	University of Puerto Rico, Mayagüez		Birds in Puerto Rico	
Natural Science	Organismic Biology and Ecology	Leopoldo E. Caltagirone-Zamora	La Cruz National Entomological Station		Also won in 1958	
Natural Science	Organismic Biology and Ecology	Newton Dias dos Santos	National Museum of Brazil			
Natural Science	Organismic Biology and Ecology	Diva Diniz Corrêa	University of São Paulo			
Natural Science	Organismic Biology and Ecology	Bernardo Alberto Houssay				
Natural Science	Organismic Biology and Ecology	Frederico Lane	Ministry of Agriculture (Brazil)		Also won in 1952	
Natural Science	Organismic Biology and Ecology	Dalcy de Oliveira Albuquerque	National Museum of Brazil		Also won in 1960	
Natural Science	Organismic Biology and Ecology	Herminio R. Rabanal		Fish culture in fresh water ponds	Also won in 1959	
Natural Science	Organismic Biology and Ecology	Francisco Silvério Pereira	Claretiano College			
Natural Science	Physics	Alfredo Baños Jr.	University of California, Los Angeles	All possible cases of dipole radiation in the presence of a dissipative half-space	Also won in 1935, 1936, 1937	
Natural Science	Plant Science	Fausto Folquer	National University of Tucumán		Also won in 1957	
Natural Science	Plant Science	Alvaro Fernández-Pérez	Colombian Institute of Natural Sciences		Also won in 1975	
Natural Science	Plant Science	Roberto Fresa	Ministry of Agriculture (Argentina)			
Natural Science	Plant Science	Juan Héctor Hunziker	Ministry of Agriculture (Argentina)		Also won in 1958, 1980	
Natural Science	Plant Science	Enrique Liogier y Allut	La Salle College		Also won in 1950, 1953	
Natural Science	Plant Science	Edgardo Raúl Montaldi	Ministry of Agriculture (Argentina)		Also won in 1955	
Natural Science	Plant Science	Jorge A. Soria Vasco	University of Guayaquil		Also won in 1955	
Social Science	Anthropology and Cultural Studies	Carlos Angulo Valdés	Colombian National Ethnographic Institute			
Social Science	Anthropology and Cultural Studies	Néstor Uscátegui Mendoza	Colombian National Ethnographic Institute		Also won in 1958	
Social Science	Economics	Hastings Dudley Huggins				

== See also ==
- Guggenheim Fellowship
- List of Guggenheim Fellowships awarded in 1956
- List of Guggenheim Fellowships awarded in 1958
