= Xiaofeng Cao =

Chinese plant scientist

Cao Xiaofeng
- Born: May 1965 (age 61); Beijing, china
- Citizenship: China
- Education: Peking University; China Agricultural University
- Scientific career
- Institutions: Centre for Excellence in Molecular Plant Sciences

Cao Xiaofeng (Chinese: 曹晓风; born May 1965) is a Chinese plant scientist who researches epigenetics in plants using model species in the genus Arabidopsis and rice plants. She is an elected member of the Chinese Academy of Sciences and the US National Academy of Sciences

== Early life and education ==
Xiaofeng Cao was born and grew up in Beijing. She was interested in the sciences from a young age, and knew she wanted to be a scientist since she was in middle school. She attended Peking University, graduating in 1988 with a bachelor's degree in applied biochemistry. She graduated from China Agricultural University in 1991 with a master's degree in biochemistry, and from Peking University once more in 1997 for her PhD. Her doctoral advisor was Chen Zhangliang.

== Career ==
After finishing her PhD, Cao came to the US for a postdoctoral research appointment at Washington State University. She then worked as a research associate at the University of California, Los Angeles before becoming a principal investigator at the Institute of Genetics and Developmental Biology (Chinese Academy of Sciences).

As of 2020, Cao is the Distinguished Professor in the Chinese Academy of Sciences – John Innes Centre (CAS-JIC) Centre for Excellence in Molecular Plant Sciences (CEPAMS). She is also the head of the Center for Genome Biology within the CAS Institute of Genetics and Developmental Biology. She has been part of the editorial boards of several journals, including Journal of Genetics and Genomics, The Plant Cell, Annual Review of Plant Biology, Science China Life Sciences, National Science Review, and Current Opinion in Plant Biology.

== Awards and honors ==
She is an elected member of the Chinese Academy of Sciences in 2015. In 2020, she was elected as an international member of the US National Academy of Sciences in its plant biology division. She was elected a Fellow of the Royal Society in 2026.
