= Rosel George Brown =

American science fiction author (1926–1967)

Rosel George Brown c.1966

Rosel George Brown (March 15, 1926 – November 26, 1967) was an American science fiction author.

== Biography ==
Born in New Orleans, Louisiana, she lived in the city of her birth with her husband after concluding her formal education at Sophie Newcomb College, where she majored in ancient Greek, and at the University of Minnesota where she received her M.A. in Greek. Several of her books were dedicated to her husband W. Burlie Brown, who was a history professor at Tulane University. The couple had two children, a son born in 1954 and a daughter born in 1959. In addition to writing, she worked as a teacher and a welfare visitor in Louisiana. In 1959, she was nominated for the Hugo Award for best new author. Her life and career were cut short when she died of lymphoma at the age of 41 in 1967. The fourth Nebula Award Anthology contains an obituary written by Daniel F. Galouye, and Anne McCaffrey dedicated her 1970 anthology Alchemy & Academe to Brown, along with several other people. Brown and McCaffrey had met at a Milford Writer's Workshop.

== Works ==
Brown's works were mainly written in the late 1950s to the mid-1960s and generally were favorably received by critics and readers. Her main novels are Sibyl Sue Blue a.k.a. Galactic Sibyl Sue Blue, and its sequel, The Waters of Centaurus, which chronicle the life of Sybil Sue Blue, a female detective. The Waters of Centaurus was published after her death and was copyrighted by her husband in 1970. She also collaborated on the novel Earthblood (1966) with Keith Laumer.

Rob Latham, reviewing Galactic Suburbia: Recovering Women's Science Fiction by Lisa Yaszek, notes that Yaszek's inclusion of Rosel George Brown is important viewing her, along with Margaret St. Clair, Zenna Henderson, Mildred Clingerman, and Doris Pitkin Buck as "significant 1950s talents now in danger of lapsing into obscurity."

Her short stories appeared in The Magazine of Fantasy and Science Fiction, Amazing Stories, Fantastic Universe and elsewhere. A collection of Brown's short stories, entitled A Handful of Time, was published by Ballantine Books in 1963.

== Short stories ==
A list of some of Brown's short stories follows:

- "From an Unseen Censor", Galaxy, Sep. 1958
- "Hair-Raising Adventure", Star Science Fiction #5, 1959
- "Virgin Ground", Worlds of If, Feb. 1959
- "Lost in Translation", Fantasy & Science Fiction, May 1959
- "Car Pool", Worlds of If, Jul. 1959
- "Save Your Confederate Money, Boys", Fantastic Universe, Nov. 1959
- "Flower Arrangement", Galaxy, Dec. 1959
- "Signs of the Times", Amazing Stories, Dec. 1959
- "David's Daddy", Fantastic, Jun. 1960
- "Step IV", Amazing Stories, Jun. 1960
- "There's Always a Way", Fantastic, Jul. 1960
- "A Little Human Contact", Fantasy & Science Fiction, Apr. 1960
- "Just a Suggestion", Fantasy & Science Fiction, Aug. 1960
- "Of All Possible Worlds", Fantasy & Science Fiction, Feb. 1961 (also republished in Rediscovery: science fiction by women (1958-1963))
- "Visiting Professor", Fantastic, Feb. 1961
- "The Ultimate Sin", Fantasy & Science Fiction, Oct. 1961
- "And a Tooth", Fantastic, Aug. 1962
- "Fruiting Body", Fantasy & Science Fiction, Aug. 1962
- "Smith's Revenge", original in A Handful of Time (1963)
- "The Devaluation of the Symbol", original in A Handful of Time (1963)
- "The Artist", Amazing Stories, May 1964

== Novels ==
- Earthblood (with Keith Laumer) (1966)
- Sibyl Sue Blue series
  - Sibyl Sue Blue (1966) - Also published as Galactic Sibyl Sue Blue (1968)
  - Waters of Centaurus (published posthumously) (1970)
