= Andrew Muir =

Andrew Muir may refer to:

- Andrew Muir (chess player), Scottish chess player
- Andrew Muir (politician), member of the Alliance Party of Northern Ireland
- Andrew Forest Muir (1916–1969), American historian and professor

== See also ==
- Andrew Muirhead, 15th-century bishop of Glasgow
