= Marvin Weintraub =

Polish-Canadian plant pathologist (1924–2021)

- Born: Moszeck-Szymon Wajntrob; October 17, 1924; Radom, Poland
- Died: April 2, 2021 (age 96); Vancouver, Canada
- Citizenship: Canadian
- Education: University of Toronto, BA Honours Biology (1947) University of Toronto, PhD Botany (1950)
- Occupation: Plant Pathologist
- Known for: Plant Pathology, Electron Microscopy
- Awards: New York Academy of Sciences, Elected Fellow (1960) National Research Council of Canada – Soviet Academy of Sciences Agreement, Eminent Scientist on Exchange to USSR (1968) Queen Elizabeth II Silver Jubilee Medal (1977) Canada-France Scientific Exchange Program, Exchange with France (1981)

Marvin Weintraub (October 17, 1924 – April 2, 2021) was a Polish-born, Jewish, Canadian plant pathologist.

== Early life ==
Marvin Weintraub (Moszeck-Szymon Wajntrob) was born in Radom, Poland on October 17, 1924. He emigrated to Toronto in 1930 with his father Abraham, mother Rachel, and brother Jerry. Weintraub became a Canadian citizen in 1935.

Weintraub attended the University of Toronto, where he earned a Bachelor of Arts in honours biology (1947) and a Doctor of Philosophy in botany (1950). Two years later, his thesis, "Leaf Movements in Mimosa pudica L.", was published in the New Phytologist.

== Career ==
He joined the Dominion Laboratory of Plant Pathology in St. Catharines, Ontario, where he was a member of the team that made the first direct isolation of the necrotic ring spot and sour cherry yellows viruses. His research focused on the role of immunity and protection in virus infection, chemotherapeutic control of viral infections, and the cytopathology of virus-infected plants using electron microscopy.

In 1956, Weintraub spent a year as a Research Fellow at the virus laboratory at University of California, Berkeley, where he worked with Wendell Meredith Stanley and Cecil Edmund Yarwood. In 1959, Weintraub was appointed as principal research scientist and head of the virus chemistry and physiology section of the newly opened Canada Department of Agriculture, Vancouver Research Station (VRS), where he established an electron microscopy facility for the study of plant viruses. Weintraub served as an associate editor of Virology and reviewed manuscripts for the Canadian Journal of Botany, Canadian Journal of Plant Pathology, Phytopathology, and Science between 1966 and 1969. In 1968, Weintraub was designated as the Eminent Scientist on Exchange to the USSR under the National Research Council of Canada. In 1971, upon the retirement of the previous director, Weintraub became director of the VRS and served in this capacity until his retirement in 1989.

Weintraub was an honorary professor at the University of British Columbia in the department of plant science, and was appointed by the minister of agriculture as BC's chief liaison officer to the federal department of agriculture in 1977.

== Awards and honours ==
- 1960 – Fellow of the New York Academy of Sciences
- 1977 – Queen Elizabeth II Silver Jubilee Medal
- 2019 – The Legislative Assembly of British Columbia recognized Weintraub's 95th birthday
