= Galactic Sibyl Sue Blue =

1966 novel by Rosel George Brown

(Galactic) Sibyl Sue Blue
- Dust-jacket from the first edition
- Author: Rosel George Brown
- Cover artist: John Alcorn
- Language: English
- Genre: Science fiction novel
- Publisher: Doubleday Books
- Publication date: 1966
- Publication place: United States
- Media type: Print (Hardback)
- Pages: 183 pp
- Followed by: The Waters of Centaurus

Sibyl Sue Blue, better known under its paperback title, Galactic Sibyl Sue Blue, is a science fiction detective novel by Rosel George Brown, originally published in hardcover by Doubleday in 1966. The retitled paperback reprint appeared from Berkley Books in 1968. A German translation, Die Plasmagötter, followed in 1971.

Sibyl Sue Blue, Brown's first novel, is also her first of two novels featuring the title character, "the interstellar adventures of a tough female cop and her teenage daughter". In the initial story, Blue investigates "a foreign virus that caused suicides", leading to a confrontation with "the mass vegetable mind of a menacing planet, an aspirant dictator, and an ex-husband who has become part of the plant life".

== Reception ==
Judith Merril noted that the title heroine, far from being a sexless genre stereotype, was instead "the swingingest mama since -- well, since." She received the "wildly entertaining" novel quite favorably, concluding that "under all the froth and fun and furious action, there is more acute comment on contemporary society than you are likely to find in any half dozen deadly serious social novels". Kirkus Reviews also praised Blue as "latter day mass madness with just enough new twists to intrigue the escapegoat". P. Schuyler Miller compared the heroine to Modesty Blaise, "older, with better sense and a better figure" and concluded "I hope we see more of her".
