= Russell L. Jones =

Welsh botanist

- Born: Dyserth, Wales
- Citizenship: United Kingdom
- Education: University of Wales, Aberystwyth
- Scientific career
- Institutions: University of California, Berkeley

Russell Lewis Jones is a Welsh botanist who researches plant communication molecules, particularly those that regulate the activity of seeds. He was awarded a Guggenheim Fellowship in 1972. From 1993 to 1994 he was the president of the American Society of Plant Physiologists. He was the editor of the Annual Review of Plant Physiology and Plant Molecular Biology (later the Annual Review of Plant Biology) from 1994–2001.

== Early life and education ==
Russell Lewis Jones was born in Dyserth in rural Wales. Unsatisfied with his high school, which did not offer courses in zoology or botany, he began attending college at the age of sixteen. He then attended the University of Wales, Aberystwyth for his bachelor's degree and PhD. For his doctoral research under Irving David James Phillips, he researched gibberellins, which are plant hormones.

== Career ==
Upon finishing his PhD, he conducted postdoctoral research at Michigan State University's Plant Research Laboratory. At Michigan State he worked with Anton Lang and Joe Varner. He then joined the botany department at the University of California, Berkeley in 1966 as an assistant professor. From 1981 to 1986, Jones was the chair of the botany department. Jones researched how plants process environmental cues, including via hormones and other signalling molecules. In particular, he focused on the regulation of dormancy and germination in seeds. He remained at Berkeley until his retirement in 2010. He was the editor of the Annual Review of Plant Physiology and Plant Molecular Biology (later the Annual Review of Plant Biology) from 1994–2001 and a managing editor of Planta from 1991–2001. He also served on the advisory board of Aberystwyth.

== Awards and honors ==
He was awarded a Guggenheim Fellowship in 1972 in the plant sciences category. From 1993–1994 he was the president of the American Society of Plant Physiologists (now the American Society of Plant Biologists). He was elected as a fellow of the American Society of Plant Biologists in 2007. In 2010 he won the Berkeley Citation Award for his service to the university.

== Personal life ==
Jones met his wife, Frances Margaret Jones, in 1959 while attending the University of Wales, Aberystwyth. He speaks English and Welsh.
