= Annual Review of Plant Biology =

- Discipline: Botany
- Language: English
- Edited by: Sabeeha Merchant

Publication details
- Former names: Annual Review of Plant Physiology (1950–1987); Annual Review of Plant Physiology and Plant Molecular Biology (1988–2001)
- History: 1950–present; 76 years old
- Publisher: Annual Reviews (US)
- Frequency: Annually
- Open access: Subscribe to Open
- Impact factor: 26.4 (2025)

Standard abbreviations
- ISO 4: Annu. Rev. Plant Biol.

Indexing
- CODEN: ARPBDW
- ISSN: 1543-5008 (print); 1545-2123 (web)
- LCCN: 2002229900
- OCLC no.: 50119292

Links
- Journal homepage

Annual Review of Plant Biology is a peer-reviewed scientific journal published by Annual Reviews (AR). It was first published in 1950 as the Annual Review of Plant Physiology. Sabeeha Merchant has been the editor since 2005, making her the longest-serving editor in the journal's history after Winslow Briggs (1973–1993). As of 2026, Journal Citation Reports lists the journal's 2025 impact factor as 26.4, ranking it second of 285 journal titles in the category "Plant Sciences". As of 2023, it is being published as open access, under the Subscribe to Open model.

== History ==
Annual Reviews (AR) is a nonprofit organization whose stated mission is to synthesize knowledge "for the progress of science and the benefit of society." Beginning in 1947, AR began asking plant physiologists if it would be useful to have an annual journal that published review articles summarizing the recent literature in the field. Responses indicated that this would be very favorable, and the Annual Review of Plant Physiology published its first volume in 1950. Its founding editor was Daniel I. Arnon. It was thus the seventh journal title to be published by AR. Its scope was somewhat reduced by the publication of the Annual Review of Phytopathology, first released in 1963. In 1988, its named changed to the Annual Review of Plant Physiology and Plant Molecular Biology. In the 1990s, it began having color illustrations and was published online for the first time. Its name was changed once again in 2002 to its current version, the Annual Review of Plant Biology. As of 2020, it was published both in print and electronically.

The journal covers developments in the field of plant biology, including cell biology, genetics, genomics, molecular biology, cell differentiation, tissue, acclimation (including adaptation), and methods. The journal is abstracted and indexed in the following databases.

- Chemical Abstracts Service
- MEDLINE/PubMed
- Science Citation Index
- BIOSIS Previews

== Editorial processes ==
The Annual Review of Plant Biology is helmed by the editor. The editor is assisted by the editorial committee, which includes associate editors, regular members, and occasionally guest editors. Guest members participate at the invitation of the editor, and serve terms of one year. All other members of the editorial committee are appointed by the AR board of directors and serve five-year terms. The editorial committee determines which topics should be included in each volume and solicits reviews from qualified authors. Unsolicited manuscripts are not accepted. Peer review of accepted manuscripts is undertaken by the editorial committee.

=== Editors of volumes ===
Dates indicate publication years in which someone was credited as a lead editor or co-editor of a journal volume. The planning process for a volume begins well before the volume appears, so appointment to the position of lead editor generally occurred prior to the first year shown here. An editor who has retired or died may be credited as a lead editor of a volume that they helped to plan, even if it is published after their retirement or death.

- Daniel I. Arnon (1950–1955)
- Lawrence Rogers Blinks (1956)
- Alden Springer Crafts (1957–1959)
- Leonard Machlis (1959–1972)
- Winslow Briggs (1973–1993)
- Russell L. Jones (1994–2001)
- Deborah Delmer (2002–2004)
- Sabeeha Merchant (2005–present)

=== Current editorial committee ===
As of 2022, the editorial committee consists of the editor and the following members:

- Wilhelm Gruissem
- Donald R. Ort
- Ian T. Baldwin
- Magdalena Bezanilla
- Xiaofeng Cao
- Mark Estelle
- Patricia León
- Keiko U. Torii
- Cyril Zipfel
