= Herschel Leibowitz =

Herschel Weldon Leibowitz
- Born: February 21, 1925; York, Pennsylvania
- Died: February 13, 2011; State College, Pennsylvania
- Education: University of Pennsylvania Columbia University
- Known for: Night vision, visual illusions, visual-vestibular interactions, symbiotic psychology, Leibowitz's Law
- Awards: American Psychological Association's Distinguished Scientific Contribution Award for the Applications of Psychology (1994); Honorary doctor of science from the State University of New York (1991); American Academy of Optometry Prentice Medal (1987); Pennsylvania Optometric Association Van Essen Award (1987).
- Scientific career
- Fields: Visual perception
- Workplaces: Pennsylvania State University
- Doctoral advisor: Clarence Henry Graham

Scholar, educator, and philanthropist Herschel Leibowitz is widely recognized for his research in visual perception and for his symbiotic approach to conducting research that both advanced theory and helped in the understanding and relief of societal problems. His research on transportation safety included studies of nearsightedness during night driving, vision during civil twilight, an illusion that underlies the behavior of motorists involved in auto-train collisions, susceptibility of pilots to illusions caused by visual-vestibular interactions, and the design of aircraft instrument panels.

== Life, education and career ==
Herschel Leibowitz was the only child of Lewis and Nettie Wolfson Leibowitz. He was born and raised in York, Pennsylvania and attended school in York. He later earned his B.A. at the University of Pennsylvania and M.A. (Experimental Psychology) and Ph.D. (Physiology) at Columbia University.

Leibowitz's early studies at University of Pennsylvania were interrupted by World War II. He served in the U.S. Army during World War II, 75th Infantry Division, European Theater, and fought in the Battle of the Bulge. He studied at the Sorbonne during his military service, and then resumed his studies at the University of Pennsylvania. He later earned his M.A. (Experimental Psychology) and his Ph.D. (Physiology) from Columbia University under the guidance of Clarence Graham. Leibowitz's dissertation explored the effect of pupil size on visual acuity for photometrically matched stimuli.

In 1949, he married the former Eileen Wirtshafter. They had two children, Marjorie (1950) and Michael (1953).

He began his career as a faculty member in the Department of Neurophysiology at the University of Wisconsin (1951–1960). Following this, Leibowitz was an advisory psychologist and manager of behavioral research at IBM (1960–1962). He returned to academia in 1962 as a member of the Department of Psychology at The Pennsylvania State University where he was named Evan Pugh Professor in 1977. He retired from Penn State in 1995.

By the time of his retirement in 1995 Leibowitz had published more than 250 articles in scientific journals and had been recognized as one of the most influential researchers in perception (White, 1987). He was also a tireless advocate for psychological science. Once when offering testimony to a Congressional committee, Leibowitz pointed out that the military was investing less annually in human factors research than the cost of a single aviation mishap despite the fact that the military was blaming many such mishaps on human error.

His extended family of former graduate students and colleagues gathered in State College on several occasions for LeiboFest celebrations of science, friendship, and mentorship. The book “Visual Perception: The Influence of H.W. Leibowitz” was written by his students and close colleagues in 2002; the book contains pearls of wisdom that continue to prove useful. In general, Leibowitz enjoyed bringing into the laboratory the visual challenges that are routinely faced by people in highly demanding situations.

Leibowitz also became an avid runner; he was 50 when he completed the first of his 15 marathons. You can read more about Hersh from his family, friends, colleagues and students on posterous and Facebook.

== Research ==
Leibowitz's research investigated basic issues of visual psychophysics, perception of size, distance & motion, peripheral vision and oculomotor functioning. He also studied problems of aviation, traffic safety, motion sickness, postural instability (especially during stair descent), and the effects of stress on perception. Indeed, one of the striking characteristics of Leibowitz's research was his symbiotic view of “basic” and “applied” science. In the early 1970s, for example, Leibowitz's lab developed the laser optometer and used it to advance our basic understanding of the eyes’ focusing behavior (visual accommodation); these “basic” experiments simultaneously addressed real-world difficulties such as night myopia (Leibowitz & Owens, 1978) and visual fatigue (Tyrrell & Leibowitz, 1990).

He also connected advances in visual psychophysics and neuroscience with a wide range of matters in health science, national defense, child development, and transportation safety. He proposed that the hazards of night driving, for example, can be better understood through the neurological concept of two visual systems, explaining drivers’ over-confidence at night as resulting from sustained efficiency of visual guidance combined with selective degradation of focal recognition abilities (Leibowitz, Shupert & Post, 1985).

A defining characteristic of Leibowitz's approach to science was his enthusiasm for cultivating the development of younger scientists. He encouraged his graduate students to indulge their curiosity (“study what bugs you!”), while always insisting on attention to his favorite question “Why is that important?” Leibowitz loved inter-disciplinary collaboration and he built productive friendships with colleagues in fields ranging from anthropology to zoology, including athletics, biomechanics, health science, law, physiology, and physics.

== Accomplishments ==
=== Author ===
Leibowitz is the author of more than 250 articles in scholarly publications, in addition to a book, "Visual Perception" (1965). In 2002, the book "Visual Perception: The Influence of Herschel W. Leibowitz" was written by several of his former students and published in his honor. Hersh always said that his greatest professional achievement was the number of students who passed through his classroom on their way to success in psychology and other fields. Over the years his former students have returned to Penn State to celebrate Hersh and his continuing influence on them.

=== Editor ===
Leibowitz served on the editorial board of Psychological Research (1965–88) and Perception and Psychophysics (1969–93). He was a consulting editor for International Journal of Vision Research, Journal of Experimental Psychology, Psychological Bulletin, SCIENCE, Behavior Research Methods and Instrumentation, Contemporary Psychology, Human Factors, and Journal of Experimental Psychology: Applied.

=== Consultant ===
He served in many government and public service roles, including consultant to the Veterans Administration, Gallaudet College, Institute for Defense Analyses, Department of the Interior, University of Michigan Infrared Physics Laboratory and Transportation Research Institute, Department of Defense, Institute for Environmental Medicine, Council of Graduate Schools, U.S. Air Force, Pennsylvania College of Technology, and Essex Corporation. He also served as an expert witness in cases involving crashes between motor vehicles and trains.

Among the other organizations he served are the National Science Foundation, National Research Council, American Psychological Association (chair, 1991–92; president of Division of Experimental Psychology, 1986–87), NATO symposiums on Image Evaluation and Motion Perception, National Institute of Mental Health, National Eye Institute, American Academy of Optometry, University of California at Berkeley School of Optometry, Aerospace Medical Association, Optical Society of America, Federal Railway Administration, and the American Federation for Aging Research.

He served on the U.S. Olympic Committee's Sports Medicine Division's Committee on Visual Performance and Safety. In 1983, he testified before the U.S. House of Representatives' Sub-Committee on Science, Research and Technology, and in 1990, testified before the U.S. Senate Appropriations Committee for Defense.

== Honors and awards ==
Among his numerous honors, Leibowitz received the American Psychological Association’s Distinguished Scientific Contribution Award for the Applications of Psychology (1994), the American Academy of Optometry’s Prentice Medal (1987), Pennsylvania Optometric Association's Van Essen Award (1987), and honorary Doctor of Science from the State University of New York (1991). He launched distant collaborations with the support of fellowships from the Guggenheim Fellowship (1957-58) for research at LMU Munich, Senior von Humboldt Fellowship (1976–78). In 1983, he was a Fellow at the Center for Advanced Study in the Behavioral Sciences at Stanford University.

He also served on the advisory board of the Pennsylvania Transportation Institute, Penn State Applied Research Laboratory, Center for Higher Education, National Society to Prevent Blindness, and Life-Sight Advisory Committee. In addition, he was active on the National Research Council Vision Committee, chairing numerous initiatives.

Leibowitz was a Fellow of the American Psychological Association, American Association for the Advancement of Science, American Academy of Optometry, Human Factors Society, and Optical Society of America, and a member of the International Perimetric Society, Eastern Psychological Association, American Medical Athletic Association, Association for Research in Vision and Ophthalmology, Society for Scientific Exploration, International Society for Ecological Psychology, American Psychological Society, and Sigma Xi.
