= Anne Catherine Hof Blinks =

Botanist, weaver and textile scholar (1903–1995)

Anne Catherine Hof Blinks (1903–1995) was an American botanist and textiles scholar.

Blinks worked at the Hopkins Marine Station of Stanford University and Harvard University Herbaria where she primarily studied and curated algae. Species that she described included Derbesia osterhoutii (L.R.Blinks & A.C.H.Blinks) J.Z.Page from Great Sound, Bermuda, as Halicystis osterhoutii L.R.Blinks & A.C.H.Blinks.

Blinks was also known for her work on historic and pre-historical textiles. For over 45 years, she studied, wrote about, collected and created unusual textiles, traveling widely. She amassed a large collection, which later became the basis for a teaching collection. Her work in textiles was acknowledged with the publication of the Festschrift In Celebration of the Curious Mind: A Festschrift to Honor Anne Blinks on Her 80th Birthday (1983).

== Personal life ==
Anne Hof and Lawrence Rogers Blinks (1900-1989) were married in 1928. He became a professor of biology at Stanford and director of Stanford's Hopkins Marine Station in Pacific Grove from 1943 to 1965. They had a child, John Rogers Blinks.

== Botany career ==
Blinks enrolled at Radcliffe College, the women's partner to then-all-male Harvard University, studying marine biology at Farlow Herbarium. After marrying Lawrence Blinks, she accompanied him to the Bermuda Biological Laboratory. While there they discovered a species of Halicystis that they named for Winthrop Osterhout, Halicystis osterhoutii.

Blinks worked at the Hopkins Marine Station of Stanford University and Harvard University Herbaria studying and curating algae.

The Anne Hof Blinks Fellowship in Marine Biology at the University of Washington was established in her memory to support students from diverse backgrounds. It is now part of the university's Blinks-REU Program of research experiences and internships.

== Textiles career ==
Blinks was also known for her work on historic and pre-historical textiles. She focused on the "whole cloth", studying the fibers, dyes, tools, and techniques used to create textiles. Blinks took an experimental archaeology approach through attempting ancient methods of fiber preparation and weaving methods. She is credited with discovering and popularizing techniques such as the "overspin" or "collapse" technique, in which the yarn is twisted so that it "kinks on itself". This technique has been used by fiber artist Lillian Elliott.

Blinks studied, collected and created unusual textiles, amassing a large collection between 1949 and 1995. This became the basis of a teaching collection assembled by members of the Santa Cruz Handweavers' Guild (later the Santa Cruz Textile Arts Guild).

She was particularly interested in South American textiles. Among those she studied were the Andean Indians, visiting Santiago, Chile, and the Mayoruna Indians of Peru. She also visited, studied and wrote about the production of textiles in Thailand, describing the use of an elaborate supplementary harness of as many as 300 additional lease rods used in the production of royal textiles.

Blinks was actively engaged in studying the genetics of sheep, and breeding for particular fleece characteristics such as a deep brown wool which she used in her textiles. She bred sheep at her home on Jack's Peak, 522 Loma Alta Road, Carmel, California.

Her many years of work in the study, practice and teaching of textiles were acknowledged with the publication of the Festschrift In Celebration of the Curious Mind: A Festschrift to Honor Anne Blinks on Her 80th Birthday (1983).
