= Winslow Briggs =

American plant biologist (1928–2019)

Winslow R. Briggs
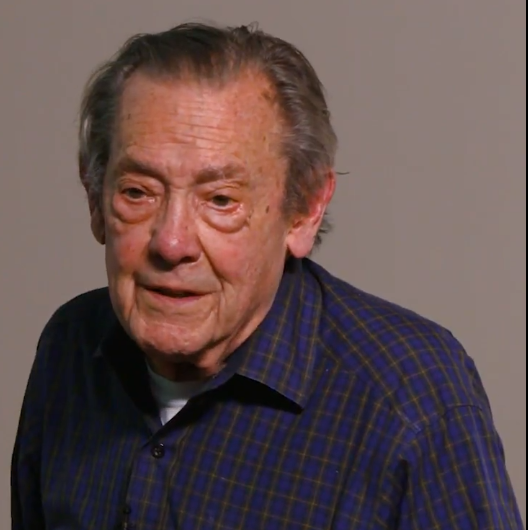
- Born: April 29, 1928; Saint Paul, Minnesota
- Died: February 11, 2019 (aged 90); Stanford, California
- Education: Harvard University
- Known for: Phototropism
- Spouse: Ann Morrill
- Awards: International Prize for Biology; Guggenheim fellowship
- Scientific career
- Fields: Plant biology
- Workplaces: Stanford University

Winslow Russell Briggs (April 29, 1928 – February 11, 2019) was an American plant biologist who introduced techniques from molecular biology to the field of plant biology. Briggs was an international leader in molecular biological research on plant sensing, in particular how plants respond to light for growth and development and the understanding of both red and blue-light photoreceptor systems in plants. His work has made substantial contributions to plant science, agriculture and ecology.

Briggs served as President of the American Institute of Biological Sciences in 1981. He was the editor of the Annual Review of Plant Physiology and Plant Molecular Biology (later the Annual Review of Plant Biology) from 1973 to 1993.

== Education ==
Briggs graduated from Harvard University with a Bachelor of Arts in 1951, a Master of Arts in 1952, and a Doctor of Philosophy in 1956.

== Career ==
Between 1955 and 1967, Briggs was an instructor in the Department of Biological Sciences at Stanford University and successively became an assistant professor in 1957. In 1962 he was promoted to associate professor and became a professor in 1966. In 1967 he moved to Harvard University as a professor in the Department of Biology.

In 1973 he returned to Department of Biological Sciences at Stanford University as a professor and as a Director of the Department of Plant Biology, Carnegie Institution for Science. From 1993 until his death in 2019, he continued to do research as a director emeritus in the Department of Plant Biology at Carnegie Institution for Science.

In addition to memberships in the National Academy of Sciences (NAS) and the American Academy of Arts and Sciences (AAAS), Briggs was a member of the American Institute of Biological Sciences (President in 1981), the American Society of Plant Physiologists (chairman 1975-1976), the Botanical Society of America, the Nature Conservancy, and the American Society for Photobiology.

== Research ==
Briggs conducted research on the physiology and biochemistry in the development of plants in response to light. He made major contributions to understanding the biochemical and physical characteristics of photoreceptors of plants. He demonstrated through experiments that the phototropic bending of plant stems to follow a light source has its basis in the transport of auxin. He identified and studied both the red and far-red light photoreceptors of plants and the blue light receptor that mediates phototropism. Using thale cress (Arabidopsis thaliana) Briggs was able to clone the gene for phototropin.

According to ISIHighlyCited, Briggs is one of the most cited scientists in the field of botany and zoology. Briggs was (co-) author of articles in journals such as American Journal of Botany, Nature, Philosophical Transactions of the Royal Society of London, Proceedings of the National Academy of Sciences of the United States of America, Science and Scientific American. Along with John L. Spudich he was editor of the Handbook of Photosensory Receptors (2005).

He was an avid mountaineer and had scaled several prominent peaks. He was a volunteer at Henry W. Coe State Park for 40 years. He organized volunteers in 2007 to study the park's recovery from a wildfire, and discovered that the smoke contained chemicals that helped to stimulate the sprouting of seeds of rare plants that lie dormant and return after a fire.

Briggs died on February 11, 2019, at Stanford Medical Center at the age of 90.

== Awards and honors ==
Briggs received many honors during his career.

- 1973, Guggenheim fellowship for natural sciences, US & Canada
- 1973, Certificate of Merit, Botanical Society of America
- 1974, Member, US National Academy of Sciences (NAS)
- 1975, Member, American Academy of Arts and Sciences (AAAS)
- 1983, Distinguished Fellow, Botanical Society of America
- 1986, Member, Deutsche Akademie der Naturforscher Leopoldina.
- 1995, Sterling Hendricks Medal, United States Department of Agriculture and the American Chemical Society
- 2001, Bernard Axelrod Lecturer, Purdue University
- 2002, Honorary doctorate, Albert-Ludwigs-Universität Freiburg
- 2007, Adolph E. Gude, Jr. Award, American Society of Plant Biologists
- 2009, International Prize for Biology, Japan Society for the Promotion of Science
- 2010, Einstein Professor, Chinese Academy of Sciences
- 2016, doctoral degree honoris causa, Hebrew University of Jerusalem
- 2018, Albert Nelson Marquis Lifetime Achievement Award, Marquis Who's Who

Briggs has been recognized as a Pioneer Member of the American Society of Plant Biologists.
