= Alden Springer Crafts =

American botanist (1897–1990)

- Born: June 25, 1897; Fort Collins, Colorado, U.S.
- Died: February 9, 1990 (aged 92); Yolo, California, U.S.
- Education: University of California, Davis
- Scientific career
- Fields: Botany
- Workplaces: University of California, Davis

Alden Springer Crafts (25 June 1897, Fort Collins, Colorado – 9 February 1990, Davis, California) was an American professor of botany, known as the first person in the United States to have the title "Weed Control Scientist" in academic employment. He was President of the American Society of Plant Physiologists for 1955, and President of the Weed Society of America (later renamed the Weed Science Society of America) for 1958–1960. Crafts was the editor of the Annual Review of Plant Physiology (now the Annual Review of Plant Biology) from 1957 to 1959.

== Biography ==
After graduating from Oakland High School. the sixth oldest high school in the state of California, Crafts matriculated in 1916 at the College of Agriculture of the University of California, Berkeley (UC Berkeley). After completing one year of academic study, he left college to work as an agricultural laborer at the Kearney field station. In 1918 he and his two brothers, Andrew B. Crafts (1885–1966) and Henry Alonzo Crafts, Jr. (1889–1964), purchased a farm in Potter Valley near Ukiah, California. Alden Crafts worked on the farm until 1925 when he enrolled at the University of California, Davis (UC Davis). He graduated there in 1927 with B.S. and in 1930 with Ph.D. Wilfred William Robbins (1884–1952), who was on Crafts's thesis committee, offered him an academic position in weed control at UC Davis. However, Crafts declined the offer because he had accepted a National Research Council fellowship at Cornell University. For the academic year 1930–1931 he worked at Cornell on translocation in plants under the supervision of O. F. Curtis. At Cornell, Crafts was also influenced by Walter C. Muenscher (1891–1963), a botanist noted for his expertise on weeds.

In 1932 Crafts returned to California to work as an assistant botanist with the title "Weed Control Scientist" at the California Agricultural Experiment Station. In the department of botany at UC Davis, he became in 1936 an assistant professor and in 1946 a full professor, retiring in 1964 as professor emeritus.

Beginning with studies of dilute foliar application of sodium arsenite for control of deep-rooted field bindweed led to Dr. Crafts's primary research interest—the mechanism of translocation in plants, particularly phloem translocation (e.g. Crafts, 1935). He pioneered research on autoradiography to follow translocation in plants. That work resulted in more than one hundred refereed scientific papers and ten books.

He published articles in Plant Physiology, Hilgardia, Stain Technology, the American Journal of Botany, Science, the Botanical Gazette, California Agriculture, and the Journal of the American Society of Agronomy. The textbook Weed Control with co-authors, Wilfred W. Robbins, Alden S. Crafts, and Richard N. Raynor, was published in 1942 (2nd edition, 1952; 3rd edition, 1962). The fourth edition was published in 1975 with the title Modern Weed Control.

Crafts married Alice E. Hardesty (1903–1974) on June 25, 1926. His body was buried at Potter Valley Cemetery in Mendocino County, California.

== Awards and honors ==
- 1938 — Guggenheim Fellowship for the academic year 1938–1939
- 1955 — President of the American Society of Plant Physiologists for the year 1955 (elected in 1954)
- 1957 — Guggenheim Fellowship for the academic year 1957–1958
- 1957 — Fulbright Fellowship for the academic year 1957–1958
- 1958 — President of the Weed Society of America for 2 academic years 1958–1960
