= Lawrence Rogers Blinks =

American botanist (1900–1989)

- Born: April 22, 1900; Michigan City
- Died: March 4, 1989 (aged 88)
- Education: Harvard University, Carnegie Institution for Science
- Employer: Stanford University
- Spouse(s): Anne Catherine Hof Blinks
- Awards: Guggenheim Fellowship (1938)

Lawrence Rogers Blinks (April 22, 1900 – March 4, 1989) was an American biologist with research interests in photosynthesis and electrophysiology. He served as the editor of the Annual Review of Plant Physiology (now the Annual Review of Plant Biology) for 1956.

== Life and education ==
Lawrence Rogers Blinks was born in Michigan City, Indiana, on April 22, 1900, to parents Walter Moulton Blinks and Ella Little (Rogers) Blinks. He attended Kalamazoo College and Stanford University, before attending Harvard University where he was awarded a BS in 1923 and MA in 1925. He also completed his PhD at Harvard in 1926 under the direction of Winthrop Osterhout. Blinks married botanist Anne Catherine Hof in 1928 and they had one son. At age 88, Lawrence Blinks died on March 22, 1989, in Pacific Grove, California.

== Career ==
After graduation, Blinks continued to work with Osterhout at the Bermuda Biological Station and Rockefeller Institute. In 1933, he joined the faculty of Stanford University and worked on the main campus before serving the director of Stanford's Hopkins Marine Station in Pacific Grove from 1943 to 1965. After retiring from Stanford, he worked as a visiting professor at UC Santa Cruz from 1966 to 1973 and helped to develop the new UC campus's Department of Biological Sciences.

== Awards ==
- Guggenheim Fellowship (1939, 1948)
- Fellow of the American Academy of Arts and Sciences (1949)
- American Society of Plant Biology Stephen Hales Award (1952)
- Member of the National Academy of Sciences (1955)
- Fulbright Scholarship (1957)
