= Shan-Fu Shen =

Chinese-American aerospace engineer (1921–2006)

Shan-Fu Shen (Chinese: 沈申甫; 31 August 1921 – 22 December 2006) was a Chinese-American aerospace engineer.

A native of Shanghai, Shen graduated from National Central University (later Southeast University, then Nanjing University) in 1941. He won governmental scholarships for graduate level study, and completed his Doctor of Science degree at the Massachusetts Institute of Technology in 1949, advised by Chia-Chiao Lin and Qian Xuesen. Shen remained at MIT for the next two years as a research associate, before joining the Aeronautical Engineering Department at the University of Maryland, College Park. At the suggestion of William R. Sears, Shen moved to Cornell University in 1961. Shen was later appointed to the John Edison Sweet Professorship, and gained emeritus status upon retirement in 1991.

Over the course of his career, Shen was awarded a Guggenheim Fellowship in 1957, and elected to a member of the Academia Sinica and the United States National Academy of Engineering in 1972 and 1985, respectively.

Shen died on 22 December 2006 in Ithaca, New York, aged 85.
