= Leonard Machlis =

American botanist

- Born: April 13, 1915; Seattle, Washington
- Died: March 26, 1976 (aged 60); Berkeley, California
- Citizenship: US
- Education: Washington State University; University of Hawaiʻi; University of California, Berkeley
- Partner: Gertrude Therese née Rafferty
- Children: 4
- Scientific career
- Institutions: U.S. Department of Agriculture; University of Illinois; University of California, Berkeley

Leonard Machlis (April 13, 1915 – March 26, 1976) was an American botanist. He was best known for his research on plant hormones involved in sexual reproduction. He was the editor of the Annual Review of Plant Physiology from 1959 to 1972 and received a Guggenheim Fellowship in 1957.

== Early life and education ==
Leonard Machlis, who went by "Len", was born on April 13, 1915 in Seattle, Washington to parents Beatrice and Samuel, both immigrants from Russia. He had two younger siblings, Miriam and Jack. He first attended Washington State University, graduating in 1937. Next, he went to the University of Hawaiʻi to complete a master's degree with Harry Clements, followed by a PhD at the University of California. Berkeley under Dennis Robert Hoagland in 1943.

== Career ==
Machlis's early career was spent on war-related projects. He first worked for the U.S. Department of Agriculture for propagation of guayule plants for rubber production. Next, he worked on a guided missile project. After the war's conclusion, he briefly taught botany at the University of Illinois before accepting a position at University of California, Berkeley in 1946. There, he researched the nutrition of fungi, as well as chemical signalling between fungi gametes. He and Berkeley colleague Henry Rapoport discovered sirenin, which was "the first-known lower plant sex hormone or pheromone". He was made the chair of the botany department in 1962, and remained thus until 1968. He was the editor of the Annual Review of Plant Physiology (now the Annual Review of Plant Biology) from 1959–1972.

== Awards and honors ==
Machlis received a Guggenheim Fellowship in 1957 in the field of plant sciences.

== Personal life and death ==
He met Gertrude Therese née Rafferty while he was at the University Illinois; they married in 1946. Gertrude had a doctorate in anatomy and physiology. After they moved to California, she taught at Mills College. They had four children together. He died on March 26, 1976, at his home in Berkeley, California.
