= California Agriculture =

- Discipline: Agriculture
- Language: English
- Edited by: Jim Downing, Deborah Thompson

Publication details
- History: 1946–present
- Publisher: University of California Division of Agriculture and Natural Resources (United States)
- Frequency: Quarterly
- Open access: Yes

Standard abbreviations
- ISO 4: Calif. Agric.

Indexing
- ISSN: 0008-0845
- OCLC no.: 1552530

Links
- Journal homepage; Online access; Online archive

California Agriculture is a quarterly peer-reviewed, scientific journal reporting news and research on agricultural, natural, and human resources that is published by the University of California Division of Agriculture and Natural Resources. The journal was established in December 1946.

== Special issues ==
California Agriculture often has special issues that explore timely topics, which have recently included biofuels, climate change, and food as medicine.

== Awards ==
California Agriculture has won several awards from the Association for Communication Excellence in Agriculture, Natural Resources, and Life and Human Sciences (ACE).

== Open access ==
Full text is available for free on the journal's website, which has the complete contents dating back to 1946.
