= Helen Clapesattle =

American historian (1908–1993)

Director of the University of Minnesota Press
- In office 1947–1965

Personal details
- Born: November 11, 1908 Fort Wayne, Indiana, U.S.
- Died: June 15, 1993 (aged 84) New Mexico, U.S.
- Spouse: Roger W. Shugg (died 1993)
- Occupation: Historian
- Awards: Guggenheim Fellowship (1957)

Academic background
- Education: Oberlin College; University of Minnesota

Helen Berniece Clapesattle (November 11, 1908 – June 15, 1993) was an American historian and publisher. While working as an editorial assistant at the University of Minnesota Press, she was hired to work on The Doctors Mayo, released in 1941. She was the UMP's director from 1953 until 1956, as well as a 1957 Guggenheim Fellow.

== Biography ==
Helen Berniece Clapesattle was born on November 11, 1908, in Fort Wayne, Indiana, the daughter of Laura Rehrer and Fort Wayne pharmacist George Adam Clapesattle. After her parents died in the 1920s, she was a caretaker for three of her siblings and worked at the Allen County Public Library. Following her recovery from headaches sustained by a streetcar injury, she started attending Oberlin College, where she obtained her BA in 1934.

From 1934 to 1937, Clapesattle worked as a history teaching assistant at the University of Minnesota, where she obtained her MA during the latter year. In 1937, she moved to the University of Minnesota Press, becoming an editorial assistant. While working at UMP, the university hired her to write a biography of William James Mayo and Charles Horace Mayo, one of the co-founders of the Mayo Clinic. She had been given the job due to her history degree, and her lack of knowledge allowed her to write without confusing a general audience with unfamiliar medical terminology. In 1941, she published The Doctors Mayo, her serialized biography of the brothers in The Atlantic, as a book; it was so popular it sold out during its first three printings. Her book also spurred interest in working at the Mayo Clinic.

Clapesattle was promoted to assistant editor in 1942 and, after The Doctors Mayo became a success, editor-in-chief in 1945. She was a 1942-1945 Rockefeller Foundation regional writing fellow. She was director of UMP from 1953, holding the position before stepping down in 1956 following her marriage. In 1957, she was awarded a Guggenheim Fellowship "for a study of the part played by the search for health in westward migration and the settlement of frontier areas in the United States". In 1958, she published "When Minnesota Was Florida's Rival", a pamphlet on the trend of 19th-century climate migration to Minnesota. In 1984, she published another physician biography, Dr. Webb of Colorado Springs, centered on Gerald Bertram Webb. Following the release of the book, Shugg confirmed her formal retirement.

Clapesattle was married to Roger W. Shugg, a historian who once served as director of University of Chicago Press, until his death in 1993. They had no children. They moved to Albuquerque in 1967. Known to shun publicity, Clapesattle did not allow an image of her to be added to Dr. Webb of Colorado Springs's jacket.

Clapesattle died on June 15, 1993, in New Mexico; she was 84.

== Works ==
- The Doctors Mayo (1941) (Note: Reviews of this work:)
- Dr. Webb of Colorado Springs (1984) (Note: Reviews of this work:)
