= Eleanor Rosenberg =

American literary scholar (1908–1998)

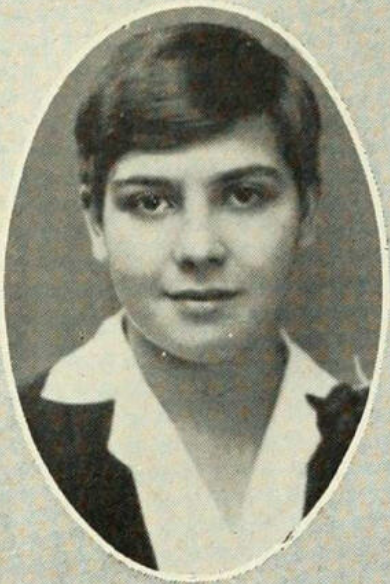
- Rosenberg, from the 1929 yearbook of Barnard College
- Born: April 9, 1908; New York, New York, U.S.
- Died: June 13, 1998 (aged 90); New York, New York, U.S.
- Occupations: College professor, literary scholar

Eleanor Rosenberg (April 9, 1908 – June 13, 1998) was an American professor of English literature. She was on the faculty at Barnard College from 1951 to 1973, and received a Guggenheim Fellowship in 1957.

== Early life and education ==
Rosenberg was born in New York City, the daughter of Bernard Rosenberg and Helen L. Rosenberg. Her father was a dentist. She attended Hunter College High School, and graduated from Barnard College in 1929.

== Career ==
Rosenberg began teaching at Barnard College as a visiting professor in 1951, published her book on the first Earl of Leicester in 1955, achieved full professor status in 1959, and retired in 1973; she remained active in campus life as professor emeritus, and served on the Barnard Library committee in 1976. In 1973, she was presented with Barnard's Distinguished Alumna Award.

Rosenberg received a Guggenheim fellowship in 1957, for her studies concerning "literature on the New World, as known in Tudor England".

== Publications ==
- "Giacopo Castelvetro: Italian Publisher in Elizabethan London and His Patrons" (1943)
- Leicester, Patron of Letters (1955)
- "Giacopo Castelvetro in Scandinavia" (1976)

== Personal life ==
Rosenberg shared an apartment with Ruth J. Dean in retirement. She died in 1998, at the age of 90, in New York.
