= Journal of Genetics and Genomics =

- Discipline: Genomics, genetics
- Language: English
- Edited by: Jianru Zuo

Publication details
- Former name: Acta Genetica Sinica
- History: 1974–present
- Publisher: Elsevier (China)
- Frequency: Monthly
- Impact factor: 5.9 (2022)

Standard abbreviations
- ISO 4: J. Genet. Genom.

Indexing
- ISSN: 1673-8527
- LCCN: 2007203310
- OCLC no.: 180161630

Links
- Journal homepage; Online access; Online archive

The Journal of Genetics and Genomics (sometimes abbreviated JGG) is a monthly peer-reviewed scientific journal covering the fields of genetics and genomics. It was established in 1974 as Acta Genetica Sinica, obtaining its current name in 2007. It is published by Elsevier and the editor-in-chief is Jianru Zuo (Institute of Genetics and Developmental Biology Chinese Academy of Sciences). According to the Journal Citation Reports, the journal has a 2022 impact factor of 5.9.
