= Marcia Nardi =

American poet (1901–1990)

Marcia Nardi (1901–1990), born Lillian Massell in Boston, Massachusetts, was an American poet.

== Biography ==
Nardi attended Girls’ Latin School and Wellesley College but decided to drop out of university in 1921, at which time she moved to Greenwich Village and remade herself as the poet Marcia Nardi. During this period, Nardi contributed poetry and book reviews to publications such as The Nation, The New Republic, Quarterly Review of Literature, The New York Times, and the New York Herald Tribune.

The birth of Nardi's son, Paul, in 1926 and the responsibilities of motherhood required Nardi to curtail her writing in order to earn a living through odd jobs (such as clerking at a department store, waitressing, and proofreading). In 1942, Nardi met William Carlos Williams with whom she began a correspondence. Williams used Nardi's letters, which discuss the difficulties of being a female poet in contemporary literary circles, in his epic poem Paterson. Williams also encouraged Nardi to publish her poetry, an endeavor that came to fruition with Nardi's first book Poems published by Swallow Press in 1956. In the 1940s, Nardi married painter and writer John Charles Lang and the couple resided in a community of artists called Maverick Colony.

Nardi worked extensively with John Edmunds between 1972 and 1983, with the intention of publishing a collection of her poetry; however this project did not result in a publication before Nardi's death in 1990.

== Sources ==
- The Marcia Nardi Papers are at the Beinecke Rare Book and Manuscript Library
- Oliphant, Dave, ed. Rossetti to Sexton: Six Women Poets at Texas. Austin, Texas: Harry Ransom Humanities Research Center, University of Texas at Austin, 1992.
- O’Neil, Elizabeth Murrie, ed. The Last Word: Letters Between Marcia Nardi and William Carlos Williams. Iowa City: University of Iowa Press, 1994.
- Nardi, Marcia. Poems. Denver: A. Swallow, 1956.
