= Cecil Edmund Yarwood =

- Born: September 16, 1908; Sumas, Washington
- Died: September 10, 1981 (age 73); Brisbane, Australia
- Citizenship: Canadian and American
- Education: University of British Columbia, BSA Purdue University, MS University of Wisconsin-Madison, PhD
- Partner: Evangeline Alderman
- Children: Ann, Kathryn, Peggy, Mary, and Edward
- Scientific career
- Fields: Plant pathology
- Institutions: University of California, Berkeley
- Thesis: (1934)
- Doctoral advisor: James G. Dickson

Cecil Edmund Yarwood (1908–1981) was an American-Canadian plant pathologist whose work focused on obligate parasites of plants, viruses, and conditions that predisposed plants to infections. He is considered an authority on rust (fungus) and powdery mildew.

== Education and career ==
Yarwood was the third of four children of Clare and Helma Yarwood. He grew up on the Canadian–American border near Sumas, Washington, giving him dual citizenship. Graduating from high school at the age of 15, he spent much of his time managing the family farm. He received a BSA in agriculture from the University of British Columbia in 1929 and an MS in plant pathology from Purdue University in 1931, where he studied under Edwin Butterworth Mains and M. W. Gardner. He received his PhD in plant pathology in 1934 from the University of Wisconsin-Madison. His doctoral thesis, supervised by James G. Dickson, was titled, "The diurnal cycle of the powdery mildew, Erysiphe polygoni".

Yarwood spent his entire career at the University of California, Berkeley, starting in 1934 as an instructor and junior plant pathologist and retiring in 1975 as a full professor. He served on the editorial board for the scientific journals Phytopathology and Virology, and was also the president of the Pacific Division of the American Phytopathological Society in 1946. He continued to research and publish after retiring.

== Research ==
Yarwood published on a variety of plant pathology topics including fungi, powdery mildew, rusts, viruses, and predisposing factors. Some of his earlier work demonstrated that, contrary to what was previously believed, powdery mildew conidia could germinate in dry conditions. This was possible, he found, because powdery mildew fungi (Erysiphe polygoni, E. graminis, and E. cichoracearum) had 4.5 times higher water content than some other fungal conidia. He also showed that about half of all known basidiospores at the time had a vertical orientation while attached to the basidium. Work previously done by Arthur Henry Reginald Buller had stated that the spores were horizontally oriented.

Yarwood's work on predisposition examined biotic and abiotic contributing factors. He investigated how one infection could enable or enhance a secondary infection that was otherwise not common, coining the phrase "absolute predisposition" to describe situations where one infection was required for the secondary infection. He also demonstrated that some plant leaves were able to tolerate higher temperatures (55 °C) after being exposed to lower temperatures (50 °C) 12–48 hours prior.

Although not a virologist, Yarwood did some work on virus transmission, interaction, and characterization. Some of this work focused on improving inoculation methods from the standard Carborundum-dependent methods. He also worked to improve the timing of virus assays by demonstrating that there is sometimes a latent period after inoculation when the virus is difficult to detect.

== Awards and recognition ==
- Guggenheim Fellowship to the University of Cambridge, 1957
- Miller Research Professorship, awarded by the Miller Institute at UC Berkeley, 1963–4
- Fellow of the American Phytopathological Society, 1965
- Honorary D.Sc. degree from the University of British Columbia, 1979
- A. D. Thomas J. D. Ferguson dedicated a 1982 paper on powdery mildew to Yarwood
