= W. Burlie Brown =

American historian (1922–2005)

William Burlie Brown (March 3, 1922 – June 29, 2005) was a historian at Tulane University, in New Orleans, for more than three decades.

W. Burlie Brown, who never used his first name, was a native of New Orleans. He entered Tulane as a pre-law student to please his parents. He was the first in his family to go to college. After two years in the Pacific during World War II, as part of the Marines, Brown received his law degree from Tulane. He married Rosel George, science fiction writer and specialist in ancient Greece, in 1947; they had two children. He practiced law for two years, but eventually went back to school as a student in 1949, and left with a Doctorate in history from the University of North Carolina at Chapel Hill. Brown joined Tulane's history faculty in 1951. He was awarded a Danforth teacher grant in 1955 and a Guggenheim Fellowship in 1957. He was a consultant to the federal Department of Health, Education and Welfare from 1963 to 1967. His wife died that year, of lymphoma.

Brown, who retired in 1987, also was active in the Episcopal Church, serving on local and national committees and teaching classes for people considering joining the church. He was a member of the vestry at the Chapel of the Holy Spirit, the campus ministry for Tulane and Loyola universities. At 83, he died leaving behind his wife, Gillian Fansler Brown, along with a son Robin Ernest Brown, and a daughter Jennifer Jo Brown. He also had three stepsons—Stephen Hammond, Justin Hammond, and John Hammond—along with eight grandchildren and two great-grandchildren.
