= Andrew Forest Muir =

American historian (1916–1969)

Andrew Forest Muir (January 8, 1916 – February 3, 1969) was an American historian and university professor.

== Early life ==
Andrew Forest Muir was born on January 8, 1916, in Houston to J.B. and Annie Jane (Ewing) Muir. He grew up in Houston and attended public schools. He enrolled at the Rice University and earned a baccalaureate degree in 1838.

== Career ==
Muir remained at Rice University until he completed his master's degree in 1942. He moved to Austin, where he entered the University of Texas. Before earning his doctorate in 1949, he taught at various schools in Hawaii. During most of the 1950s, he taught at Daniel Baker College in Brownwood, Texas, and at the Polytechnic Institute in Puerto Rico. Rice University hired him as a professor of history in 1957, where he was also a Guggenheim Scholar.

Muir was also a writer and editor. He wrote a column for the Houston Post and he wrote entries for the Handbook of Texas. Muir was associate editor of the Journal of Southern History and editor of the memoir, Texas in 1837.

== Death and legacy ==
Muir died in Houston on February 3, 1969. At his death, he was researching the biography of William Marsh Rice, the founder of Rice University. These notes were edited and published posthumously in 1972.
