= St George's Hospital Reports =

19th-century medical journal

St. George's Hospital Reports was a medical journal. The journal was published on behalf of St George's Hospital by John Churchill & Sons and then by J & A Churchill after John Churchill, Sr.'s retirement in 1870. There were ten volumes with articles dated from 1866 to 1879.

== Issues ==
- Volumes I–VI, one volume per year from 1866 to 1871, edited by John William Ogle and Timothy Holmes
- Volume VII, 1872–1874, edited by John William Ogle and Timothy Holmes
- Volume VIII, 1874–1876, edited by William Howship Dickinson and Timothy Holmes
- Volume IX, 1877–1878, edited by William Howship Dickinson and T. Pickering Pick
- Volume X, 1879 (published 1880), edited by Thomas Tillyer Whipham and T. Pickering Pick
