= Timothy Holmes =

English surgeon (1825–1907)

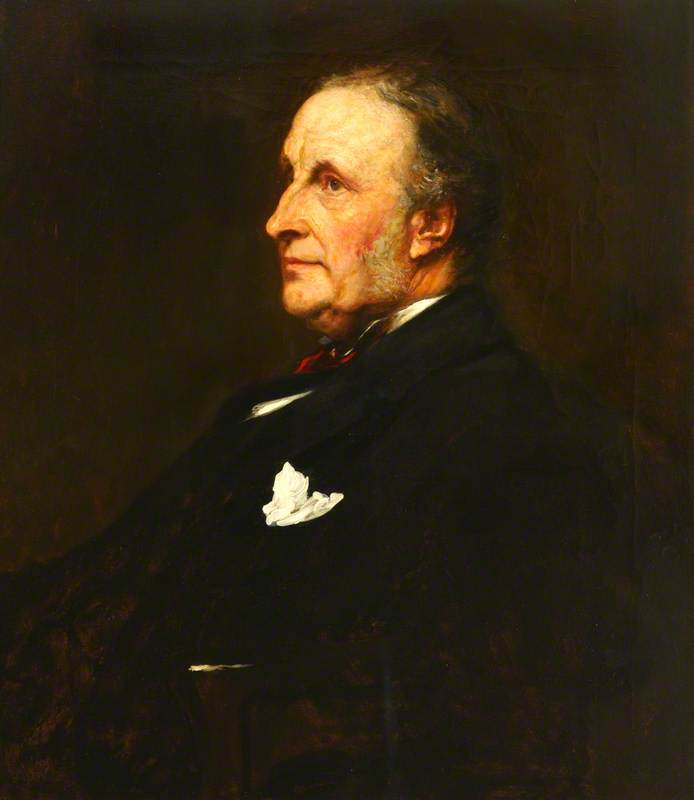
- Timothy Holmes by William Blake Richmond in 1889
- Born: 9 May 1825
- Died: 8 September 1907 (aged 82)

Timothy Holmes FRCS (9 May 1825 in Islington, Greater London – 8 September 1907) was an English surgeon, known as the editor of several editions of Gray's Anatomy.

== Life ==
Holmes was the third child of Elizabeth (Hanby) and John Holmes, warehouseman /merchant of 68 Watling St, London. In 1841, Holmes was living in Colebrooke Row, Islington. His siblings were Thomas Holmes, born 1821, and Elizabeth (Peterson Ward) born 1823.

Holmes was educated at Merchant Taylors' School and then at Pembroke College, Cambridge with B.A. in 1847 and M.A. in 1850. He studied medicine at St George's Hospital. In 1853 he was made a Fellow of the Royal College of Surgeons without previously having acquired the usual diploma of M.R.C.S. At St George's Hospital he became house surgeon, surgical registrar, and in 1867 full surgeon. Also, at the Hospital for Sick Children in Great Ormond Street, Holmes was assistant surgeon from 1859 and then full surgeon from 1861 to 1868. He was also appointed Chief Surgeon of the Metropolitan Police in 1865.

In 1889 Holmes was the chairman of the Building Committee of the Royal Medical and Chirurgical Society of London; the committee was in charge of moving the Society from its old quarters in Berners Street to a house in Hanover Square. In 1890 he was elected the Society's president.

== Works ==
Holmes wrote A Treatise on the Surgical Treatment of the Diseases of Infancy and Childhood (1868) and was the editor of the third through ninth editions of Gray's Anatomy, preceded in the editorship by Henry Gray and succeeded by T. Pickering Pick. Holmes was the co-editor of the first 8 volumes of the journal St George's Hospital Reports. With John S. Bristowe, Holmes published in 1863 a report, commissioned by the Privy Council, on the state of hospitals and their administration in the U.K. He was the editor of 4 editions of A Treatise on Surgery: Its Principles and Practice (1st edition, 1875; 2nd, 1878; 3rd, 1882; 4th, 1886). He wrote a biography of Sir Benjamin Collins Brodie published in 1898. He was a friend of the pathologist and syphilologist Henry Lee, writing his obituary in The Lancet in 1898. Holmes also created the first English translation of Lay Down Your Arms! (Die Waffen nieder!) by Bertha von Suttner in 1892. The second edition of his translation was published in 1908.

Police appointments
Preceded by John William Fisher	Chief Surgeon of the Metropolitan Police; 1865-1885	Succeeded by Alexander Oberlin Mackellar
