= John William Ogle =

English physician

John William Ogle FRCP FSA (30 July 1824, Leeds – 8 August 1905) was an English physician, honoured as the 1880 Harveian Orator.

Ogle was educated at Trinity College, Oxford with B.A. in 1847. After medical training at the medical school of St George's Hospital, he became L.R.C.P. in 1850. At Oxford he became M.A. and B.M. in 1851 and D.M. in 1857. In 1855 he was made F.R.C.P. At St George's Hospital he was curator of the museum of morbid anatomy with Henry Gray, upon whose death in 1861 he succeeded to the lecturership on pathology. Ogle became In 1857 Assistant Physician and in 1866 Full Physician. In 1869 he delivered the Croonian Lectures. At the Royal College of Physicians he was censor in the three years 1873, 1874, and 1884 and vice-president in 1886.

Ogle was active in medical literature. Together with Timothy Holmes [q. v. Suppl. II] he founded the now extinct 'St. George's Hospital Reports’ (1866-79) and edited seven out of the ten volumes. He was also editor of the 'British and Foreign Medico-Chirurgical Review.' He contributed widely to the medical papers and societies, making 160 communications to the 'Transactions of the Pathological Society of London' alone. His independently published works were the Harveian oration for 1880 at the Royal College of Physicians, which contains much scholarly information, and a small work 'On the Relief of Excessive and Dangerous Tympanites by Puncture of the Abdomen,' 1888.

Ogle married in 1854 and the marriage produced five sons and one daughter. He was a devout Anglican and in the last years of his life, suffering from paralytic weakness, he lived at Highgate vicarage with one of his sons.
