= Gray's Anatomy =

Textbook on human anatomy

Anatomy: Descriptive and Surgical
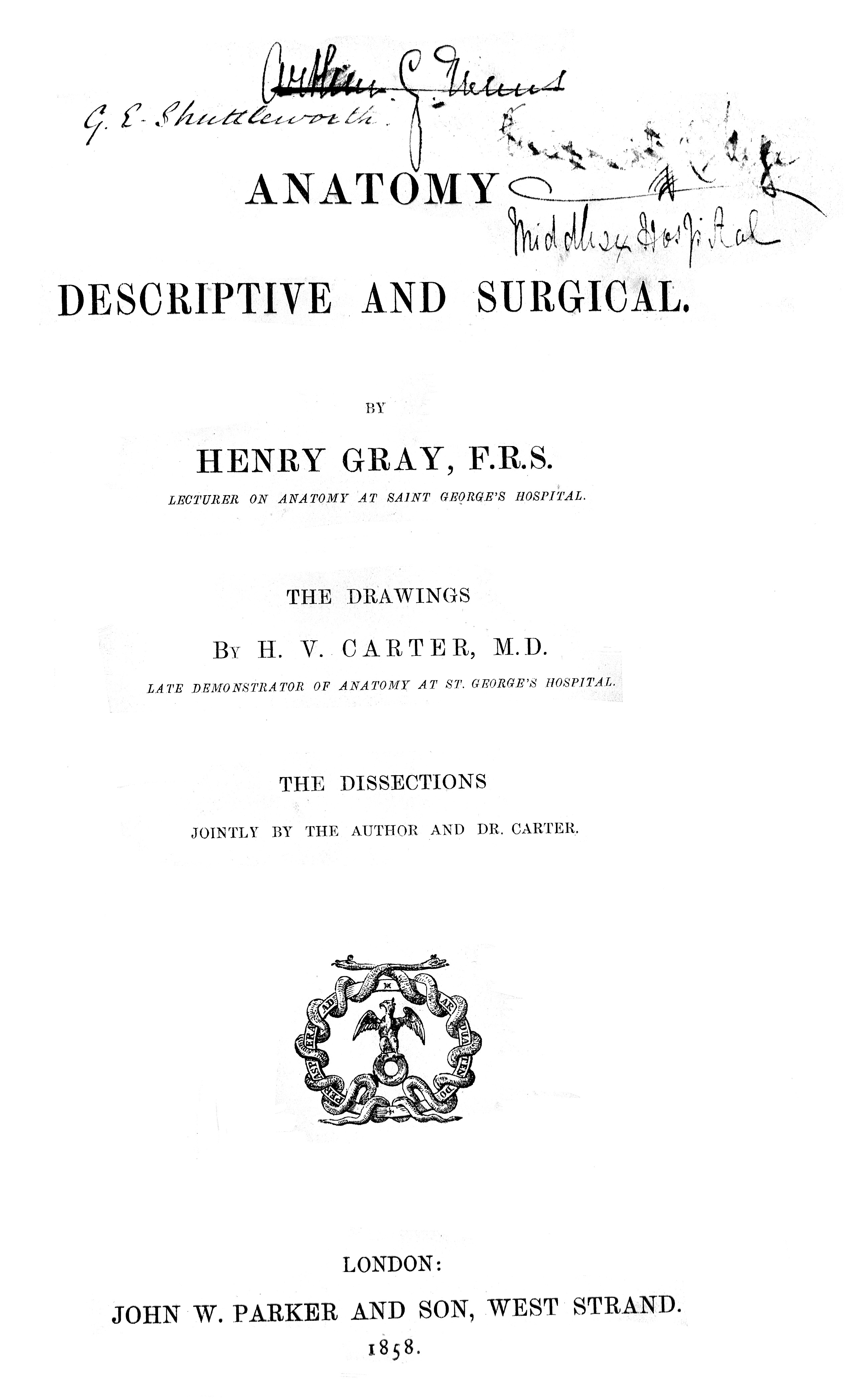
- Author: Henry Gray
- Illustrator: Henry Vandyke Carter
- Language: English
- Publisher: John William Parker & Son
- Publication date: 1858
- Publication place: England

Gray's Anatomy: The Anatomical Basis of Clinical Practice
- Editor: Susan Standring (editor-in-chief)
- Language: English
- Publisher: Elsevier
- Publication date: 2020
- Pages: 1,606
- ISBN: 9780702077050
- Forty-second edition

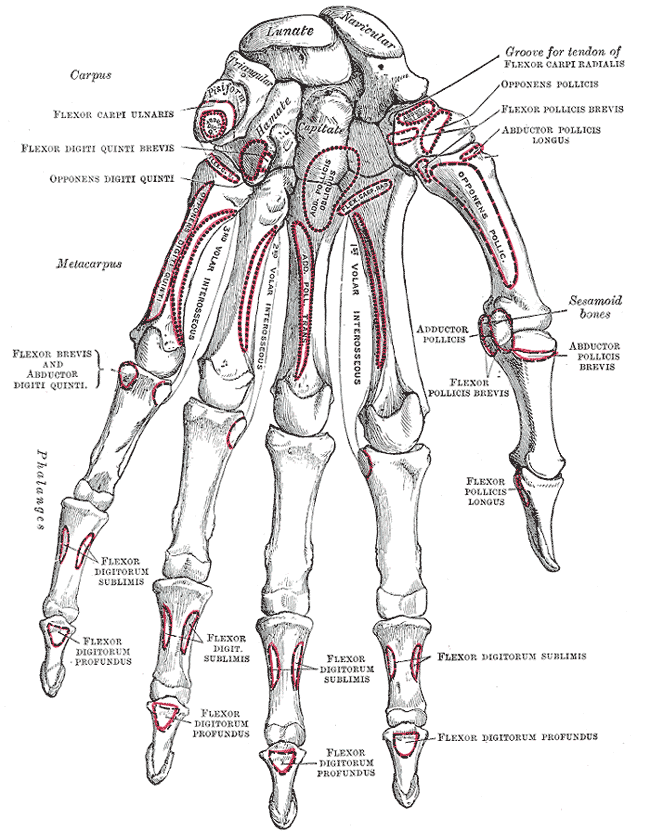
An illustration from the American 1918 edition

Gray's Anatomy is a reference book on human anatomy written by Henry Gray, illustrated by Henry Vandyke Carter and first published in London in 1858. It continues to be considered one of the most important modern medical textbooks ever written. There have been many revisions of the book, with the latest, the 43rd, being published in December 2025.

Earlier editions were called Anatomy: Descriptive and Surgical, Anatomy of the Human Body and Gray's Anatomy: Descriptive and Applied, but the book's name is commonly shortened to, and later editions are titled, Gray's Anatomy.

== Publication history ==
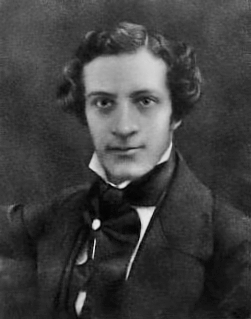
Henry Gray

=== Origins ===
The English anatomist Henry Gray was born in 1827. He studied the development of the endocrine glands and spleen and in 1853 was appointed Lecturer on Anatomy at St George's Hospital Medical School in London. In 1855, he approached his colleague Henry Vandyke Carter with his idea to produce an inexpensive and accessible anatomy textbook for medical students. Dissecting unclaimed bodies from workhouse and hospital mortuaries through the Anatomy Act 1832, the two worked for 18 months on what would form the basis of the book. Their work was first published in 1858 by John William Parker in London. It was dedicated by Gray to Sir Benjamin Collins Brodie, 1st Baronet.

An imprint of this English first edition was published in the United States in 1859, with slight alterations.

Gray prepared a second, revised edition, which was published in the United Kingdom in 1860, also by J.W. Parker. However, Gray died the following year, at the age of 34, having contracted smallpox while treating his nephew (who survived). His death had come just three years after the initial publication of his Anatomy Descriptive and Surgical.

Even so, the work on his much-praised book was continued by others.

Longman's publication reportedly began in 1863, after their acquisition of the J.W. Parker publishing business. This coincided with the publication date of the third British edition of Gray's Anatomy. Successive British editions of Gray's Anatomy continued to be published under the Longman, and more recently Churchill Livingstone/Elsevier imprints, reflecting further changes in ownership of the publishing companies over the years.

=== American editions ===
The full American rights were purchased by Blanchard and Lea, who published the first of twenty-five (Note: This count excludes the previously mentioned 1859 US publication of the English first edition.) distinct American editions of Gray's Anatomy in 1862, and whose company became Lea & Febiger in 1908. Lea & Febiger continued publishing the American editions until the company was sold in 1990.

The first American publication was edited by Richard James Dunglison, whose father Robley Dunglison was physician to Thomas Jefferson. Dunglison edited the next four editions. These were: the Second American Edition (February 1862); the New Third American from the Fifth English Edition (May 1870); the New American from the Eighth English Edition (July 1878); and the New American from the Tenth English Edition (August 1883). W. W. Keen edited the next two editions, namely: the New American from the Eleventh English Edition (September 1887); and the New American from the Thirteenth English Edition (September 1893).

In September 1896, reference to the English edition was dropped and it was published as the Fourteenth Edition, edited by Bern B. Gallaudet, F. J. Brockway, and J. P. McMurrich, who also edited the Fifteenth Edition (October 1901). There is also an edition dated 1896 which does still reference the English edition stating it is "A New Edition, Thoroughly Revised by American Authorities, from the thirteenth English Edition" and edited by T. Pickering Pick, F.R.C.S. and published by Lea Brothers & Co., Philadelphia and New York.

The Sixteenth Edition (October 1905) was edited by J. C. DaCosta, and the Seventeenth (September 1908) by DaCosta and E. A. Spitzka. Spitzka edited the Eighteenth (October 1910) and Nineteenth (July 1913) editions, and in October 1913, R. Howden edited the New American from the Eighteenth English Edition. The "American" editions then continued with consecutive numbering from the Twentieth onwards, with W. H. Lewis editing the 20th (September 1918), 21st (August 1924), 22nd (August 1930), 23rd (July 1936), and 24th (May 1942). Charles Mayo Goss edited the 25th (August 1948), 26th (July 1954), 27th (August 1959), 28th (August 1966), and 29th (January 1973). Carmine D. Clemente edited and extensively revised the 30th edition (October 1984). With the sale of Lea & Febiger in 1990, the 30th edition was the last American Edition.

=== Discrepancies in numbering of American and British editions ===
Sometimes separate editing efforts with mismatches between British and American edition numbering led to the existence, for many years, of two main "flavours" or "branches" of Gray's Anatomy: one American and the other British. This could easily cause misunderstandings and confusion, especially when quoting from or trying to purchase a certain edition. For example, a comparison of publishing histories shows that the American numbering kept roughly apace with the British up until the 16th editions in 1905, with the American editions either acknowledging the English edition, or simply matching the numbering in the 14th, 15th and 16th editions. Then the American numbering crept ahead, with the 17th American edition published in 1908, while the 17th British edition was published in 1909. This increased to a three-year gap for the 18th and 19th editions, leading to the 1913 publication of the New American from the Eighteenth English, which brought the numbering back into line. Both 20th editions were then published in the same year (1918). Thereafter, it was the British numbering that pushed ahead, with the 21st British edition in 1920, and the 21st American edition in 1924. This discrepancy continued to increase, so that the 30th British edition was published in 1949, while the 30th and last American edition was published in 1984.

== Currently available editions ==
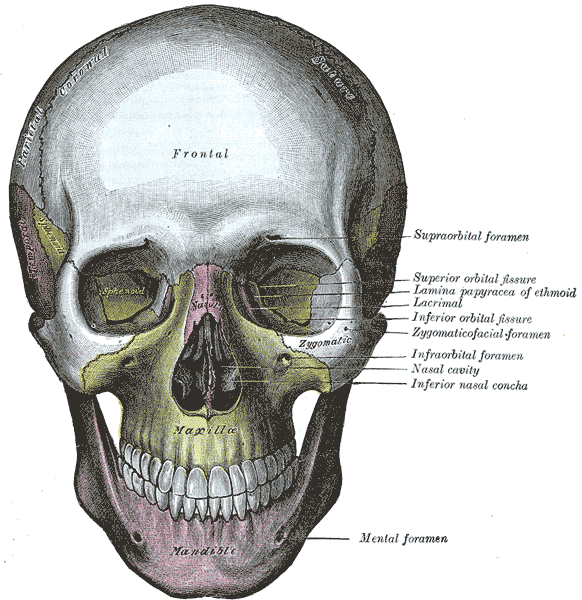
An illustration from the American 1918 edition

The current editions also contain material on histology, embryology, and pathology that complements the anatomical information. The newest edition is the 43rd edition. The more popular 41st edition of Gray's Anatomy was published on 25 September 2015 by Elsevier in both print and online versions, and is the first edition to have enhanced online content including anatomical videos and a bonus Gray's imaging library. The 41st edition also has 24 specially invited online commentaries on contemporary anatomical topics such as advances in electron and fluorescent microscopy; the neurovascular bundles of the prostate; stem cells in regenerative medicine; the anatomy of facial aging; and technical aspects and applications of diagnostic radiology.

The senior editor of this book and accompanying website on ExpertConsult is Professor Susan Standring, who is Emeritus Professor of Anatomy at King's College London. The three most recent editions differ from all previous editions in an important aspect: they present anatomical structures by their regional anatomy (i.e., ordered according to what part of the body the structures are located in – e.g. the anatomy of the bones, blood vessels and nerves, etc. of the upper extremity is described in one place). All editions of Gray's Anatomy previous to the 39th were organized by systemic anatomy (i.e., there were separate sections for the body's entire skeletal system, entire circulatory system and entire nervous system, etc.). The editors of the 39th edition acknowledged the validity of both approaches but switched to regional anatomy by popular demand.

Older, out-of-copyright editions of the book continue to be reprinted and sold, particularly on the internet. However it is not always clear which (British or American) edition these books are republications of. Many seem to be reprints of the 1901 (probably U.S.) edition. Additionally, there are several sites where various older versions can be read online.

Henry Gray wrote Gray's Anatomy with a readership of medical students and physicians in mind, especially surgeons. For many decades however, precisely because Gray's textbook became such a classic, successive editors made major efforts to preserve its position as possibly the most authoritative text on the subject in English. Toward this end, a long-term strategy appears to have been to make each edition come close to containing a fully comprehensive account of the anatomical medical understanding available at the time of publication. The explosion of medical knowledge in the 20th century led to a vast expansion of the book, which threatened to collapse under its own weight metaphorically and physically. From the 35th edition onward, increased efforts were made to reverse this trend and keep the book readable by students. Nevertheless, the 38th edition contained 2,092 pages in large format – the highest page count of any and an increase from the 35th edition, which had 1,471 pages. The 41st edition has 1,584 pages. Newer editions of Gray's Anatomy – and even several recent older ones – are still considered to be the most comprehensive and detailed textbooks on the subject. Despite previous efforts to keep Gray's Anatomy readable by students, when the 39th edition was published, students were identified as a secondary market for the book, and companion publications such as Gray's Anatomy for Students, (Note: Written by Richard L. Drake, Wayne Vogl and Adam W. M. Mitchell) Gray's Atlas of Anatomy and Gray's Anatomy Review have also been published in recent years.

== List of editions ==
Edition	Year	Main author/editor(s)	Publisher
1st	1858	Henry Gray	John William Parker & Son
2nd	1860	Henry Gray	John William Parker & Son
3rd	1864	Timothy Holmes	Longman
4th	1866	Timothy Holmes	Longman
5th	1869	Timothy Holmes	Longman
6th	1872	Timothy Holmes	Longman
7th	1875	Timothy Holmes	Longman
8th	1877	Timothy Holmes	Longman
9th	1880	Timothy Holmes	Longman
10th	1883	Thomas Pickering Pick	Longman
11th	1887	Thomas Pickering Pick	Longman
12th	1890	Thomas Pickering Pick	Longman
13th	1893	Thomas Pickering Pick	Longman
14th	1897	Thomas Pickering Pick	Longman
15th	1901	Thomas Pickering Pick & Robert Howden	Longman
16th	1905	Thomas Pickering Pick & Robert Howden	Longman
17th	1909	Robert Howden	Longman
18th	1913	Robert Howden & Arthur John Jex-Blake & W. Fedde Fedden	Longman
19th	1916	Robert Howden & Arthur John Jex-Blake & W. Fedde Fedden	Longman
20th	1918	Robert Howden & Arthur John Jex-Blake & W. Fedde Fedden	Longman
21st	1920	Robert Howden	Longman
22nd	1923	Robert Howden	Longman
23rd	1926	Robert Howden	Longman
24th	1930	Thomas Baillie Johnston	Longman
25th	1932	Thomas Baillie Johnston	Longman
26th	1935	Thomas Baillie Johnston	Longman
27th	1938	Thomas Baillie Johnston & James Whillis	Longman
28th	1942	Thomas Baillie Johnston & James Whillis	Longman
29th	1946	Thomas Baillie Johnston & James Whillis	Longman
30th	1949	Thomas Baillie Johnston & James Whillis	Longman
31st	1954	Thomas Baillie Johnston & James Whillis	Longman
32nd	1958	Thomas Baillie Johnston & David Vaughan Davies & Francis Davies	Longman
33rd	1962	David Vaughan Davies & Francis Davies	Longman
34th	1967	David Vaughan Davies & Rex Ernest Coupland	Longman
35th	1973	Peter L. Williams & Roger Warwick	Longman
36th	1980	Roger Warwick & Peter L. Williams	Churchill Livingstone
37th	1989	Peter L. Williams	Churchill Livingstone
38th	1995	Peter L. Williams	Churchill Livingstone
39th	2005	Susan Standring	Elsevier
40th	2008	Susan Standring	Elsevier
41st	2016	Susan Standring	Elsevier
42nd	2021	Susan Standring	Elsevier
43rd	2025	Susan Standring & R. Shane Tubbs	Elsevier

== General and cited references ==
- Gray, Henry (1858), Anatomy: Descriptive and Surgical, London: John W. Parker and Son, OL 24780759M Online- and PDF versions of the 1st edition at Open Library/Internet Archive. Several other editions are also available at this site.
- Gray's Anatomy: The Anatomical Basis of Clinical Practice (40th ed.), Churchill-Livingstone, Elsevier, 2008, ISBN 978-0-443-06684-9
- Richardson, Ruth (2005), "A Historical Introduction to Gray's Anatomy" (PDF), in Susan Standring (ed.), Gray's Anatomy: The Anatomical Basis of Clinical Practice (39th (electronic version) ed.), Edinburgh: Elsevier Churchill Livingston, a brief history of the British Edition of the book.
- Richardson, Ruth (2008), The Making of Mr. Gray's Anatomy, Oxford University Press, ISBN 978-0-19-955299-3
- Hayes, Bill (2007), The Anatomist: A True story of Gray's Anatomy, Ballantine, ISBN 978-0-345-45689-2
