= Alpine distress signal =

Mountain rescue communication protocol

The Alpine distress signal is a distress signal in the case of mountain emergency, an emergency in alpine areas. It involves repeating a sound or other signal six times within a minute, then pausing for a minute before repeating. There are also special emergency call numbers, for use with the telephone service by which the emergency services can be contacted.

The signal was introduced in 1894 on the suggestion of Clinton Thomas Dent and was soon adopted internationally.

== Performance ==
The Alpine distress signal traditionally consists of a signal by blasts from a whistle (may also be an air horn), which is repeated six times in the minute (every ten seconds). It is to be repeated after one minute of break in same manner.

The reply to such a signal is given with three successive indications per minute and likewise repeated after one minute of break. Thus it can be confirmed to the person/party in trouble that its distress signal was received.

Whoever receives distress signals, should confirm and alert the emergency services.

The distress signal can also be a sound, light, or visible signs:

- Audible signals: e.g. loud calling, whistles, yodeling (Deep tones are audible over a long distance.)
- Optical signals: e.g. flashlights, blinkers, sunlight mirrors, flares, flames
- Visible signs with remarkable articles of clothing, branches, smoke, etc.

Any abuse of emergency signals may lead to prosecution.

== See also ==
- Distress hand signal
- International Commission for Alpine Rescue
