= Henry Vandyke Carter =

English anatomist, illustrator of Gray's Anatomy

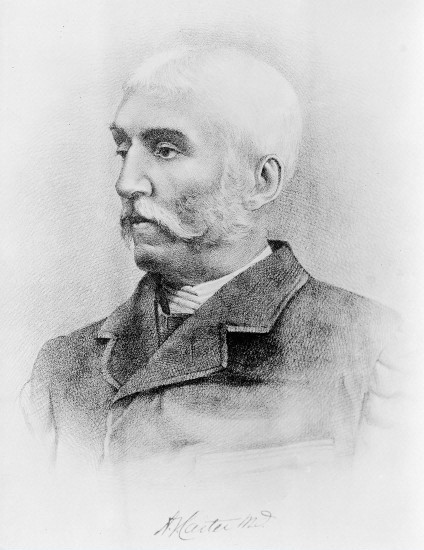
Henry Vandyke Carter, self-portrait, c.1870

Henry Vandyke Carter (born 22 May 1831 – 4 May 1897) was an English anatomist, surgeon, and anatomical artist most notable for his illustrations of the book Gray's Anatomy.

== Childhood ==
Henry Vandyke Carter was born on 22 May 1831 in Hull, England, the eldest son of the painter Henry Barlow Carter and his wife Eliza Barlow. Soon after, his parents moved to Scarborough, where he grew up. Information on Carter's private life is known in large part due to the diary that his grandmother gave him at age 14 and that he kept for life. His family was also very religious (Protestant) and Carter kept the diary as a kind of spiritual notebook.

== Early studies ==
He studied at Hull Grammar School but later abandoned his medical studies for economic reasons to pursue pharmacy-surgery. His parents expressed discomfort with the academic and social environment he was in so he transferred to London under the guidance of surgeon John Sawyer and took medical courses at St George's Hospital in London at age 17. Carter matriculated at the University of London in 1848 passed the Intermediate Examination in Medicine of the University of London in 1851, gaining honours in Anatomy and Physiology (one subject: 7th place) and in Chemistry (5th place). After the completion of his preclinical studies he took a trip to Paris (1852-1853) to further his studies and reflect on what his specialization would be. Upon returning to London, however, he realized that in spite of his talent, all seats had already been awarded with no recommendation, and his career could not take off.

== Early career ==
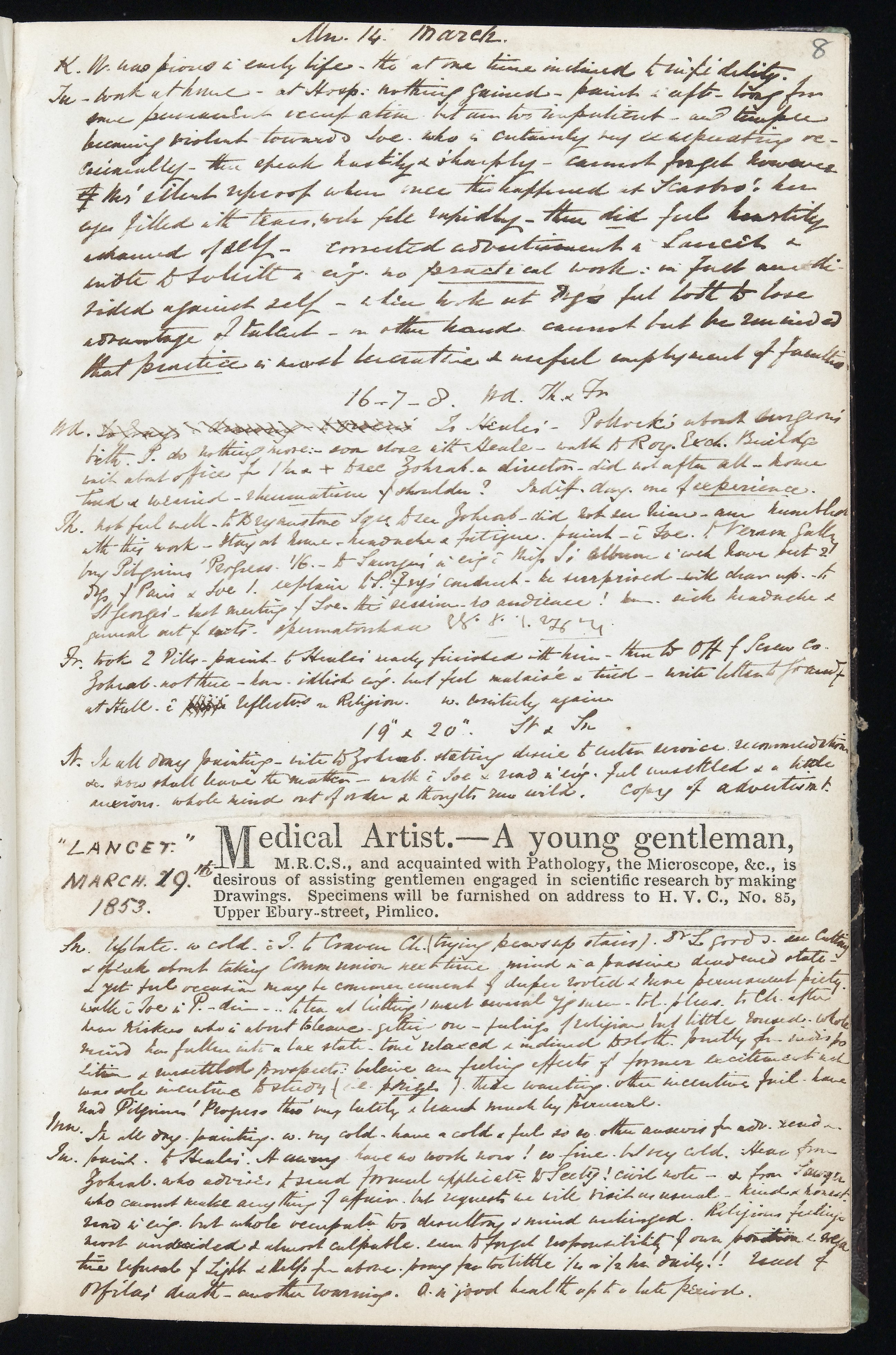
Insert published in "The Lancet"

In June 1853, Carter became a student in human and comparative anatomy at the Royal College of Surgeons. Carter sacrificed part of his small budget for an insert in the medical journal The Lancet in which he supported researchers in the medical field as an artist and illustrator. The same year he was commissioned for a large number of designs for the St. George's School of Medicine and worked for John Queckett, the first expert of microscopy, and Richard Owen, one of the best anatomists of the Victorian era. However, the working conditions and livelihood at the Royal College were difficult for Carter because of the meager salary conferred on him by Queckett and Owen, who later managed to renegotiate, and his housing situation which consisted of a small room located in the attic of the museum adjacent to the Royal College. In addition, he was too absorbed in his illustrating job. In November 1853, he failed the exam for the Bachelor of Medicine degree at the University of London, which he eventually completed with honours in Physiology & Comparative Anatomy (one subject: 3rd place) and in Surgery (4th place) in December the following year. Meanwhile, Carter grew into the idea of fully devoting himself to research and microscopy. Back in London, he was approached by his colleague and professor of anatomy, Henry Gray, with a proposal: a new fully illustrated anatomy textbook for students, which he himself created.

== Collaborations with Gray and Gray's Anatomy ==
=== The first project ===
Carter began work for Henry Gray and others in 1852, and in 1856–1857 he drew the illustrations for the now famously illustrated Gray's Anatomy. The first meeting between the two authors of Gray's Anatomy occurred probably around 1850 while they were both working at St. George's School of Medicine. In the summer of 1850 (when the two began working together in an essay on the spleen, titled "On the structure and Use of the Spleen"), Carter described Gray in his journal as a snob. However, over time there emerged similarities between the two, especially with regard to the passion and seriousness with which both dedicated themselves to medicine, which helped to bring Carter and Gray together. Initial conflict occurred with respect to the payment that Carter received from Gray for his designs, being in need of money, and that he judged inadequate for his commitment.

=== Gray's proposal and Carter's decision ===
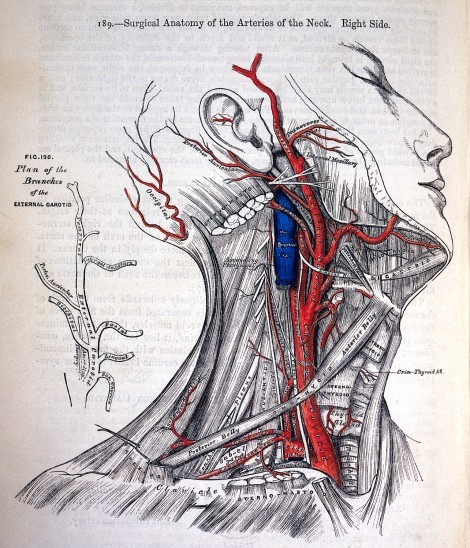
Illustration of large arteries and veins in the neck; Henry Vandyke Carter

Around 1855, Gray presented Carter the opportunity to partner with him in the drafting of an anatomy textbook for university students, tentatively titled Gray's Anatomy. Carter had, in fact, many doubts regarding the project. First, the Bachelor in Medicine did not allow him to acquire the rank of Doctor, permit him to visit, prescribe medication and perform operations. If he did not receive his doctorate in medicine he would remain assistant pharmacist, and he would be in economic need. Second, Carter was affected by the behavior of Gray concerning illustrations he made for the essay "On the structure and Use of the Spleen." The career of Gray, who was now a member of the Royal Society, had been helped greatly by Carter's illustrations, who he had not even mentioned. All this made Carter very reticent on the proposal. Finally, Carter had almost completed the drawings requested by Gray on behalf of the School of Medicine, but had not yet been paid. In his diary, he expressed the stress which the already heavy workload for the doctorate and commissioned designs subjected him.

In December 1855, the dire need for money prevailed on doubts about the honesty of Gray who, knowing the conditions of his colleague, had promised a monthly salary of ten pounds, which would surely manage to cover expenses until completion of his doctorate. On 8 January 1856, Carter and Gray came to a verbal agreement. The partnership was working, they worked well together, continuing smoothly until Christmas 1857. In December, Carter finally obtained his doctorate in medicine as well as the nomination for the post of "curatorship of pathology," for which he harbored many reservations due to his already busy schedule and, after a long reflection, he refused.

=== First edition and controversy over the title ===
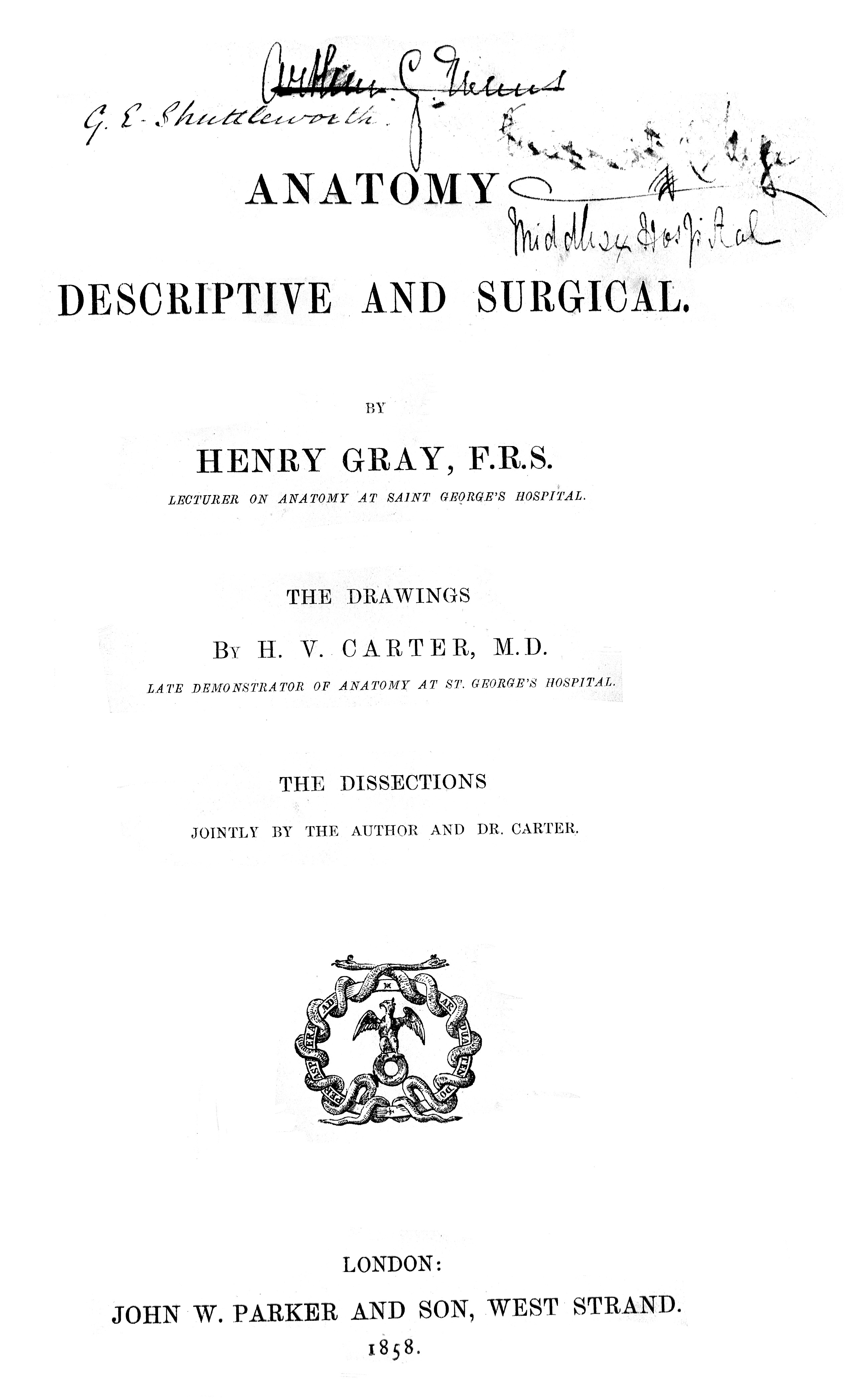
Draft of the first edition cover of Gray's Anatomy

In January 1858, while he was finishing up the latest fixes on Gray's Anatomy, Carter passed an exam to provide medical services in India, where he stayed from the following 23 March.

The first version of Gray's Anatomy, published by Parker, presented Gray and Carter in equal-sized characters names, followed by a caption on a smaller scale with each's titles. Gray was strongly opposed, believing that it took advantage of the absence of his colleague to claim that the name of his illustrator was written in smaller letters with no titles that Carter had obtained. Publishers, however, considered his contributions significant, as seen in this caption in the introduction to the first edition:

"This work is illustrated by 363 woodcuts, from original drawings, chiefly from nature, by HV Carter..."
(Gray's Anatomy, Descriptive and Surgical, introduction to the first edition by Parker Sr and Jr)

In the final cover, a compromise was reached: the removal of the Carter title, while retaining an acceptable character illustration credit. The first edition of Gray's Anatomy was published in London in 1858 and Philadelphia in 1859, which was followed by a second in 1860.

== India and later life ==
Meanwhile, Carter, who wrote the Indian Medical Service examination and joined the service in January 1858, had moved to Bombay and was married to a woman named Harriet Bushell, only to discover that her real name was Amelia Adams, previously married and whose first marriage had been canceled because of her adultery. Carter could not legally obtain the annulment of the marriage as this would entail the loss of the legitimacy of his daughter, Eliza Lily, born in September 1860. However, he never saw his wife, and came out destroyed by an experience that became publicly known quickly throughout Bombay. Carter was employed by the Indian Medical Service in Bombay from 1858 for the rest of his career. There he took up the post of Professor of Anatomy at Grant Medical College, enjoying with satisfaction the good fortune of his book. He served in Satara from 1863 to 1872. Between 1872 and 1875 he took leave and returned to Europe and worked with visiting researchers of various European nationalities. Upon his return to India, he was sent to the peninsula of Junagadh and after a short residence he published a report on leprosy in the area. He was eventually awarded the titles of "Principal of Grant Medical College" and "First Physician at JJ Hospital" and was the secretary, and then president, of the Bombay Medical Society, and went off to conduct medical research regarding the most common infectious diseases in poor sections of the Indian population, being the first researcher in the Indian subcontinent to confirm the presence of endemic diseases such as tuberculosis, (of which Robert Koch would only discover the pathogen, the "Koch bacillus", in 1892) and malaria. He worked on Spirillum or relapsing fever, for which he received a Stewart Prize in 1882.

After thirty years in India (1858-1888), Carter returned to England to settle down next to Lily's sister and family at Scarborough. In retirement, Carter was appointed "Honorary Deputy Surgeon-General and Honorary Surgeon to the Queen". He married Ellen Robinson in 1890, with whom he had two children before dying of tuberculosis on 4 May 1897, at the age of 65. He and his wife are buried together in the cemetery in Scarborough. A commemorative plaque in Belgrave Square honors his work as a physician and illustrator.

== Published work ==
- Henry Gray: On the Structure and Use of the Spleen. J. W. Parker & Son, London 1854
- Henry Gray: Anatomy, descriptive and surgical. J. W. Parker & Son, London 1858
- An account of the calculi contained in the Grant Medical College Museum, with some general remarks on calculi in India. 1860.
- Report on the prevalence & characters of leprosy in the Bombay Presidency, India, based on the official returns of 1867. Education Society's Press, 1872
- The microscopic structure and mode of formation of urinary calculi. London: J. & A. Churchill, 1873.
- On mycetoma or the fungus disease of India. London: J. & A. Churchill, 1874.
- Report on leprosy and leper-asylums in Norway, with references to India. London: G.E. Eyre and W. Spottiswoode, 1874.
- On leprosy and elephantiasis. London: Eyre & Spottiswoode, 1874.
- Postscript to a note on the histology of lepra leprosa. Transactions of the Pathological Society of London ss. 300-302 (1875)
- Modern Indian leprosy: being the report of a tour in Kattiawar, 1876, with addenda on Norwegian, Cretan and Syrian leprosy. Bombay: Times of India Steam Press, 1876.
- Tilbury Fox, T. Farquhar: On certain endemic skin and other diseases of India and hot climates generally
- Reports on leprosy, second series. London: 1876.
- Contributions to the experimental pathology of spirillum fever / by H. Vandyke Carter; communicated by James Andrew. London : J.E. Adlard, 1880
- Spirillum fever: synonyms famine or relapsing fever as seen in Western India. London: J. & A. Churchill, 1882.
- Memoir on leprosy by Brigade-Surgeon Henry Vandyke Carter, published for general information, in continuation of Government notification No. 4900, dated 7 December 1882: 'Memorandum on the prevention of leprosy by segregation of the affected. Govt. Central Press Bombay 1884
- The later history of spirillum fever at Bombay, 1882-83: memoir based upon cases read before the Medical and Physical Society. 1884.
- On a Peyerian ulcer-lesion of the small intestines, apparently new. Education Society's Press, 1886.
- Observations on the prevention of leprosy by segregation. 1887.
- Note on the occurrence of a minute blood spirillum in an Indian rat. „Scientific Memoirs by Officers of the Medical and Sanitary Departments of the Government of India". 3, ss. 45–48, 1888.
- Note on some aspects and relations of the blood-organisms in ague. Calcutta, 1888
