= Alexander Oberlin Mackellar =

Alexander Oberlin Mackellar (29 December 1845 - 15 June 1904) was a British surgeon.

== Life ==
Born in Berbice in British Guiana to the wife of a missionary who had died of yellow fever six months earlier, he remained there until summer 1846, when he was brought to England to be looked after by an uncle. Studying medicine in Manchester, Edinburgh, Paris, and Vienna and at Queen's College Belfast and University College London, he also became fluent in German and French.

After graduation he became ship's surgeon to sailors and soldiers in the East Indies and China being invalided back to Britain, before gaining the notice of William MacCormac whilst serving as an ambulance surgeon during the Franco-Prussian War. Next he joined Bernhard von Langenbeck as he inspected German military hospitals (for which Mackellar was appointed a Knight of the Military Order of Merit of Bavaria) then in February 1872 became the Royal Free Hospital's Assistant Medical Officer (and ultimately in 1887 its Surgeon and in 1894 its Senior Surgeon).

In 1873 he became a Fellow of the Royal College of Surgeons and shortly afterwards became Resident Assistant Surgeon at St Thomas's Hospital, a position he held until becoming that hospital's Assistant Surgeon. He returned to the battlefield as Surgeon-in-Chief of the Stafford House Committee's Ambulance during the Turco-Serbian War in 1876 and as Consulting Surgeon to the 5th Ambulance of the Red Crescent during the 1877 Russo-Turkish War, gaining the Knighthoods of the Gold Cross of Takovo and of the Order of Medjidie respectively.

He taught operative and practical surgery, lectured on forensic medicine and served as Examiner in Surgery at the University of Glasgow, Surgeon to both the French Hospital in Soho and from 1885 to 1904 Chief Surgeon of the Metropolitan Police, that final role proving so intense he had to give up his private practise. He suffered a severe bout of pneumonia in 1895 and retired from 7A Wimpole Street to Pinner in 1903, dying of another (this time short but acute) attack in 1904.

== Works ==
- "Introductory Address", 1885

Police appointments
Preceded by Timothy Holmes	Chief Surgeon of the Metropolitan Police; 1885-1904	Succeeded by Clinton Thomas Dent
