= Clinton Thomas Dent =

English surgeon, author and mountaineer (1850–1912)

Clinton Thomas Dent FRCS
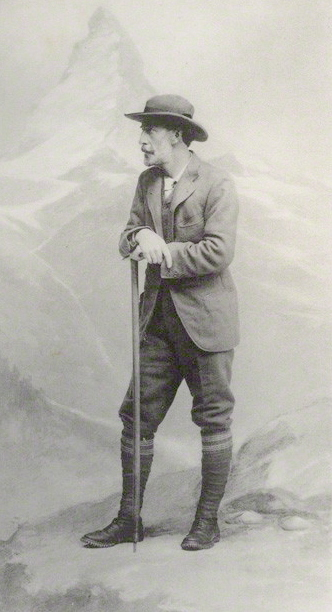
- Dent c. 1904
- Born: 7 December 1850
- Died: 26 August 1912 (aged 61)
- Education: Eton College; Trinity College; Cambridge

Clinton Thomas Dent FRCS (7 December 1850 – 26 August 1912) was an English surgeon, author and mountaineer.

== Early life ==
The fourth surviving son of Thomas Dent, he was educated at Eton College and Trinity College, Cambridge.

== Alpinism ==
Alongside Albert Mummery, Dent was one of the most prominent of the British climbers who attempted the few remaining unclimbed mountains in the Alps in the period known as the silver age of alpinism. As an alpinist, Dent was very different from Mummery:

[He] lacked the other's fiery touch, nor did he yield to the call of the mountains with Mummery's zest. Dent's expeditions had an almost austerely classic perfection ... While Mummery's alpine career hardly met with any ill will from the mountains until the very end, Dent had to wage a long and protracted war against his greatest conquest, the Dru.

Dent's first ascents in the Alps include the Lenzspitze (4,294 m) in the Pennine Alps in August 1870, with Alexander Burgener and a porter, Franz Burgener (of whom Dent wrote 'his conversational powers were limited by an odd practice of carrying heavy parcels in his mouth'), and the Portjengrat (Pizzo d'Andollo, 3,654 m) above the valley of Saas-Fee in 1871. On 5 September 1872 the combined parties of Dent and guide Alexander Burgener, with George Augustus Passingham, and his guides Ferdinand Imseng and Franz Andermatten, made the first ascent of the south-east ridge of the Zinalrothorn (4,221 m); this is the current voie normale on the mountain.

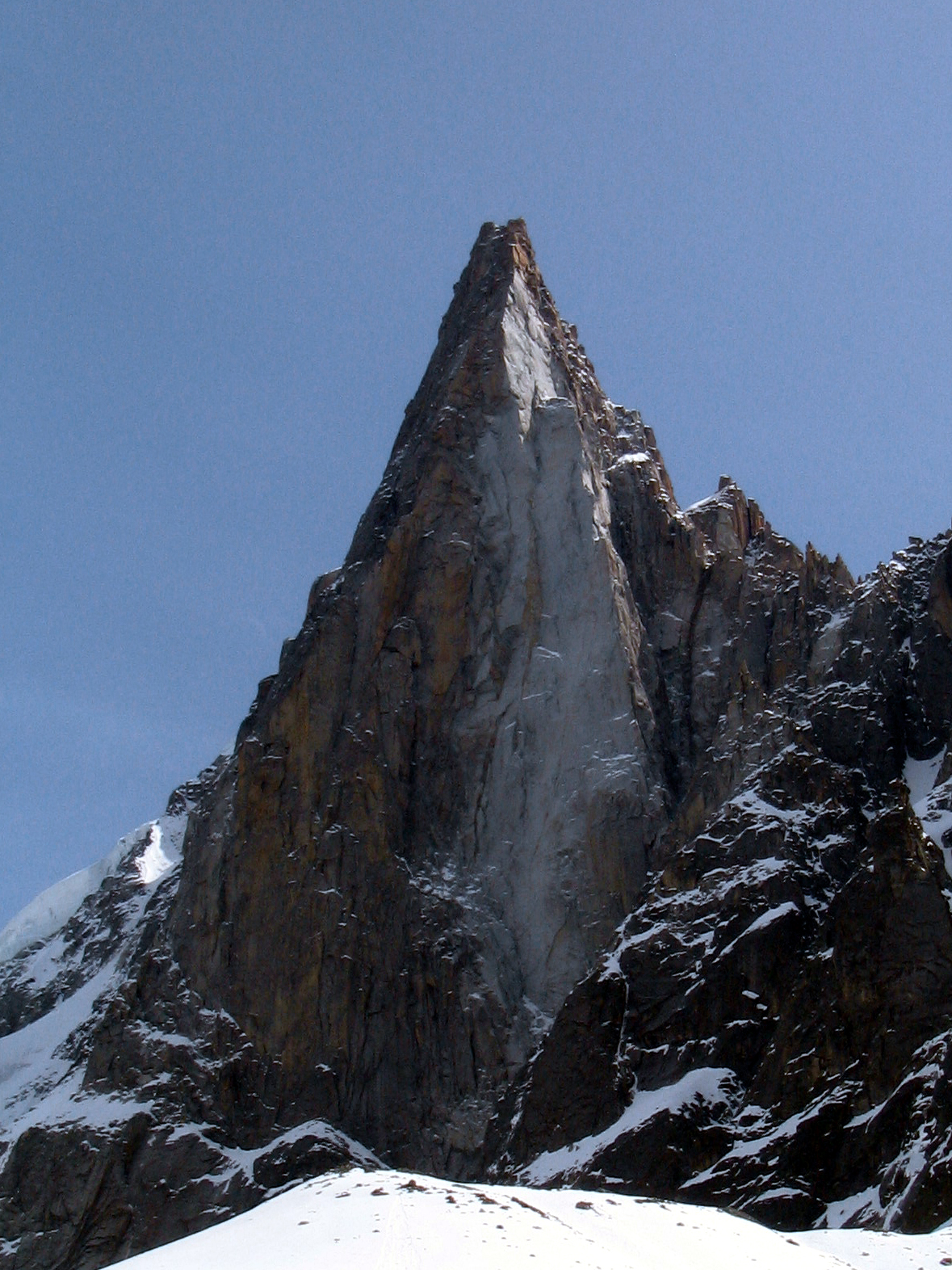
The Aiguille du Dru

He then turned his attention to the Aiguille du Dru (3,754 m), a steep granite peak in the Mont Blanc massif that had been ignored by the early generation of alpinists whose ambitions had been focused more on the higher mountains. After eighteen failed attempts with a number of different guides and companions (during which he used ladders to overcome difficulties), Dent at last made the first ascent of the Grande Aiguille du Dru (the higher of the mountain's two summits) on 12 September 1878, with James Walker Hartley and the guides Alexander Burgener and Kaspar Maurer. He wrote of the Dru:

Those who follow us, and I think there will be many, will perhaps be glad of a few hints about this peak. Taken together, it affords the most continuously interesting rock climb with which I am acquainted. There is no wearisome tramp over moraine, no great extent of snow fields to traverse. Sleeping out as we did, it would be possible to ascend and return to Chamonix in about 16 to 18 hrs. But the mountain is never safe when snow is on the rocks, and at such times stones fall freely down the couloir leading up from the head of the glacier. The best time for the expedition would be, in ordinary seasons, in the month of August. The rocks are sound and are peculiarly unlike those of other mountains. From the moment the glacier is left, hard climbing begins, and the hands as well as the feet are continuously employed. The difficulties are therefore enormously increased if the rocks be glazed or cold; and in bad weather the crags of the Dru would be as pretty a place for an accident as can well be imagined.

Together with British alpinists such as Mummery, A. W. Moore and D. W. Freshfield, Dent was involved in the pioneering of climbing in the Caucasus, where he made the first ascent of Gestola (4,860 m) with W. F. Donkin in 1886. Writing in the Alpine Journal a year later, Dent strongly encouraged the members of the Alpine Club (of which he was President from 1886 to 1889) to travel to the region:

To those that have the health, strength, experience and energy, I can but say – THERE, in that strange country, those giant peaks wait for you – silent, majestic, unvisited. Would you revive in all their freshness the pleasures which the founders of our [British Alpine] Club discovered thirty years ago? If the old feeling still is as strong as I think, as I know it to be, go there. If you love mountains for their own sakes; if you like to stand face to face with Nature where she mixes sublimity of grandeur and delicacy of beauty in perfect harmony; if these sights fill and satisfy you of themselves – go there! If you prefer the grandeur, with some of the rough edges knocked off (and carried away in tourists' pockets); if you choose rather to play at travelling and roughing it, you will stay at home in the Alps. You will have missed much, and your mountains education will have been imperfect. If you think your temper is perfectly equable – go there; you will be undeceived, and your family circle may benefit therefrom. If you wish to be far from the madding crowd, far from the noise, bustle, and vulgarity of the buzzing, clustering swarms of tourists – go there. Nature will, as it were, take you gently by the hand and seem to say, 'I am glad to welcome you; come, and you shall look upon sights that I don't choose to show to everybody. Yet more, I will make a present of them to you; and in after times you shall call up in memory recollections of me, as I can be when in the mood, and you shall hug these memories with delight and even dream on them with enthusiasm.' If you wish for this – go there. To the end of your days you will remember it with pleasure. Go there!

Dent may have been the first person to have written – in his book Above the Snow Line (1885) – that an ascent of Mount Everest was possible. According to Geoffrey Winthrop Young, 'He has often been quoted as saying that the Alps were exhausted as far back as the 1880s, and he once wrote me a friendly warning not to attempt new Alpine ways, "since there is really nothing left worth risking much for"'. He also took part in the establishment of the Alpine distress signal in 1894.

In Who's Who 1912, Dent gave his recreations as "mountaineering and travel, or any form of hard exercise; art collecting; photography".

== Medical career ==
Dent was a well-known Senior Surgeon at the St George's Hospital medical school, London, Consulting Surgeon at the Belgrave Hospital for Children, Chief Surgeon of the Metropolitan Police from 1904, and a Fellow of the Royal College of Surgeons. The University of Cambridge awarded him the honorary degree of MCh. He wrote extensively, and his publications include studies of post-surgical insanity and heart surgery, and an account of the wounded in the Transvaal War, to which he had been posted as a correspondent for the British Medical Journal. He also had a special interest in dermatology.

== Death ==
Dent died at the age of 61 after a 'mysterious attack of blood poisoning' and is buried at Kensal Green Cemetery. There is a memorial tablet to him on the Britannia Hut above Saas-Fee.

== Publications ==
- Dent, Clinton Thomas, 'The Ascent of Gestola', in On the Edge of Europe: Mountaineering in the Caucasus, ed. Audrey Salkeld, Mountaineers Books, 1994, ISBN 0-89886-388-0
- Dent, Clinton Thomas, Above The Snow Line: Mountaineering Sketches Between 1870 And 1880, Kessinger Publishing, 2007, ISBN 1-4304-9731-9
- Dent, Clinton Thomas, Mountaineering, London: Longmans, Green, 1892. 2nd edition (pp. xx + 439, with 2 pages of advertisements, 13 plates and illustrations in text by H. G. Willink and others, with contributions by W. M. Conway, D. W. Freshfield, C. E. Mathews, C. Pilkington, F. Pollock). Republished by Kessinger Publishing, 2007, ISBN 1-4304-9727-0
- Dent, Clinton Thomas and Christian Albert Theodor Billroth, Clinical Surgery. Extracts from the reports of surgical practice between the years 1860–1876, translated and edited, with annotations, by C. T. Dent and C. A. T. Billroth, New Sydenham Society, vol. 94

== Bibliography ==
- Dumler, Helmut and Burkhardt, Willi P. (1994) The High Mountains of the Alps. London: Diadem. ISBN 0906371430
- Engel, Claire (1971) Mountaineering in the Alps, London: George Allen and Unwin

Police appointments
| Preceded by Alexander Oberlin Mackellar | Chief Surgeon of the Metropolitan Police; 1904-1912 | Succeeded by Charles Alfred Ballance |
