= Susan Standring =

Neuroscientist and editor-in-chief of Gray's Anatomy

Susan Standring MBE
- Born: February 1947 (age 79); England
- Education: Guy's Hospital Medical School (PhD in Anatomy)
- Occupations: Neuroscientist, teacher, research, textbook editor
- Employer: King's College London
- Known for: Editor in chief of Gray's Anatomy
- Title: Emeritus professor
- Honours: 2015 Member of the Most Excellent Order of the British Empire (MBE)
- Website: kclpure.kcl.ac.uk/portal/en/persons/susan-standring/

Susan Standring MBE is a British neuroscientist serving as the editor-in-chief of Gray's Anatomy, a reference book for human anatomy. She is an emeritus professor of anatomy at King's College London, where she previously served as head of anatomy. From 2008 to 2010, Standring was president of the Anatomical Society. In addition to educating medical and dental students in anatomy for over forty years, Standring has led an extensive research career with over 150 papers published.

== Education ==
Standring began her education studying medicine at Guy's Hospital Medical School in 1964 before switching to pursue a PhD.

== Career ==
After completing her PhD, Standring worked as a neuroscientist, publishing over 150 articles relating to her research on repair of the peripheral nervous system. Standring previously served as president of the Peripheral Nerve Society and the Anatomical Society. Early in her career, Standring was assigned the job of creating a bibliography for 36th edition of Gray's Anatomy, after having suggested the idea to her colleague and then-editor of the book, Peter Williams. Having completed her work on the bibliography, Standring then edited the peripheral nerve section of the following edition before being promoted to editor-in-chief of the 39th edition. Standring holds this position from the 39th to the 42nd edition and has moved the text forward, introducing new online editions and incorporating interactive and motion-based graphic to further demonstrate and aid in teaching of the complexity of many structure processes. During her career as an anatomist, Standring has spent over 40 years teaching anatomy to medical and dental students. For her services to anatomical education, Standring was awarded a Member of the Most Excellent Order of the British Empire (MBE) in 2015.

Standring also served as an admissions tutor for Medicine for seven years at UMDS and King's College London (King's), helping to develop the Access to Medicine Programme at King's, which aims to expand access to healthcare professions for students studying at less selective state schools in the Greater London area or who participate in the Realising Opportunities programme of England. Through this work, she later served as an advisor in the development of similar programmes at the universities of Bradford and Southampton.

In addition to her work as editor-in-chief of Gray's Anatomy, she continues to write on applied anatomical topics and on the histories of topographical anatomy and of peripheral nerve repair. Standring currently acts as an external examiner of anatomy to several medical schools in the UK and is a trustee of the Hunterian Collection at the Royal College of Surgeons of England (RCS England), and previously presided on the Council of the Hunterian Society. Standring is also an honorary fellow of RCS England and has been a trustee of the Damiliola Taylor Trust and of Changing Faces.

== Research ==
Standring's research career has produced over 150 articles. A large part of her research consisted of nerve work, which led to her initial involvement in Gray's Anatomy. Her more recent works has involved contributions to nerve communication and anomalies that have been studied through neck dissections. Standring's work has led to the discovery of nerve variants including that of the hypoglossal nerve, anatomical variants of other branches of the cervical plexus, and the marginal mandibular nerve. Such discoveries will have implications involving operations on the neck and face. Standring has also contributed to work on nerve regeneration and nerve repair, specifically in the book Peripheral Neuropathy (2005). In retirement, Standring continues to write on applied anatomical topics and on the histories of topographical anatomy and of nerve repair.
