= Henry Lee (surgeon) =

English surgeon (1817–1898)

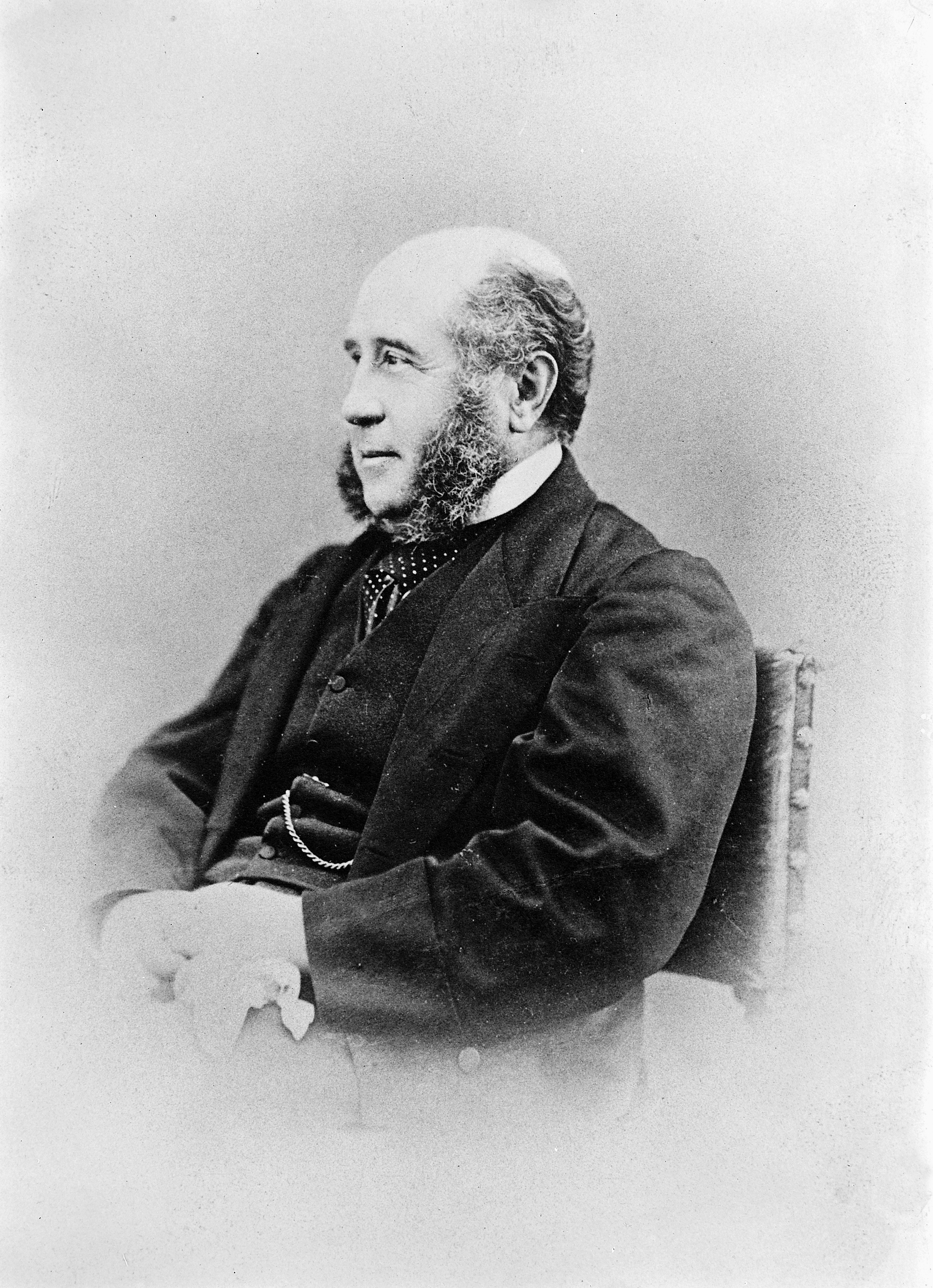
- 1873 photo (Wellcome Collection)
- Born: 18 February 1817; White Waltham, England
- Died: 11 June 1898 (aged 81)
- Resting place: Highgate Cemetery
- Occupation: Surgeon

Henry Lee (18 February 1817 – 11 June 1898) was an English surgeon, pathologist and syphilologist.

== Early life ==
Henry Lee was born on 18 February 1817 at Wooley Firs, White Waltham, near Maidenhead, Berkshire, the eldest son of Henry Pincke Lee and Matilda Lee.

His father, a captain in the Royal Artillery rose to be a lieutenant-colonel. Lee started his medical education at King's College in 1833, transferring to St George's Hospital in the following year, later becoming one of its first surgical registrars. He became MRCS in February 1839 and FRCS in December 1844.

== Career ==
In 1847 Lee was appointed assistant surgeon at the newly founded King's College Hospital and also became a consulting surgeon to Queen Charlotte's Hospital and the London Lock Hospital where he started work as a syphilologist. In 1861 he returned to St George's Hospital, becoming a full surgeon there two years later. Lee had a long connection with the Royal College of Surgeons, having been awarded its Jacksonian Prize in 1849 with his dissertation on the Causes, Consequences and Treatment of Purulent Deposits. He was a member of the Council between 1870 and 1878, and in 1875 delivered the Museum Lectures on Surgery and Pathology as Hunterian Professor, his subject being "Syphilis and Local Diseases affecting principally the Organs of Generation". At St George's Hospital he became the curator of its museum and was a lecturer in physiology.

Lee was a follower of the teaching of John Hunter. His friend Timothy Holmes, who wrote his obituary notice in the Lancet, was of the opinion that his works most likely to stand the test of time were his treatise on practical pathology, his lectures on syphilis and his treatise on venereal diseases in Holmes's System of Surgery. Lee was the author of many works and contributions to scientific journals.

== Later life ==
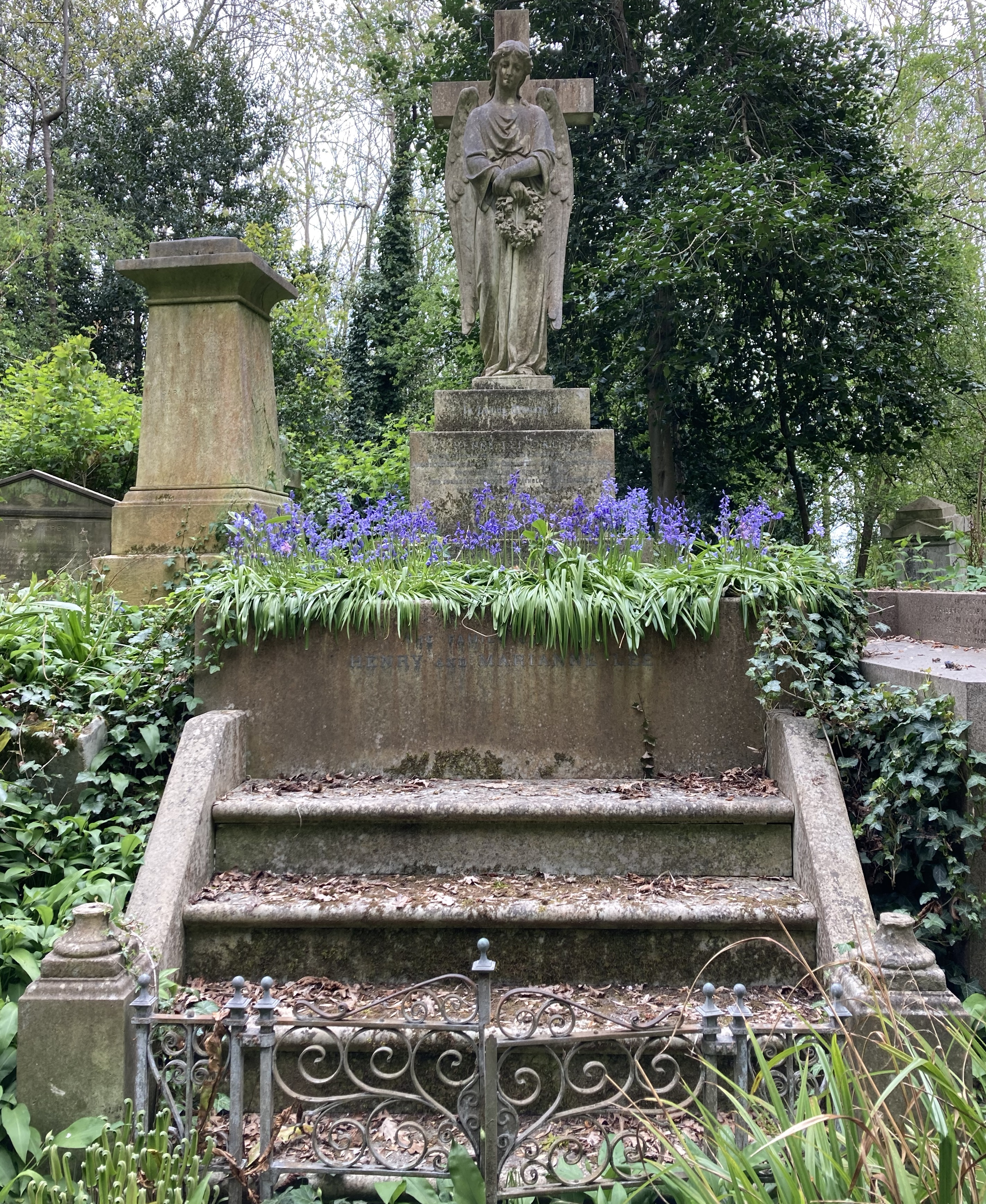
Grave of Henry Lee in Highgate Cemetery

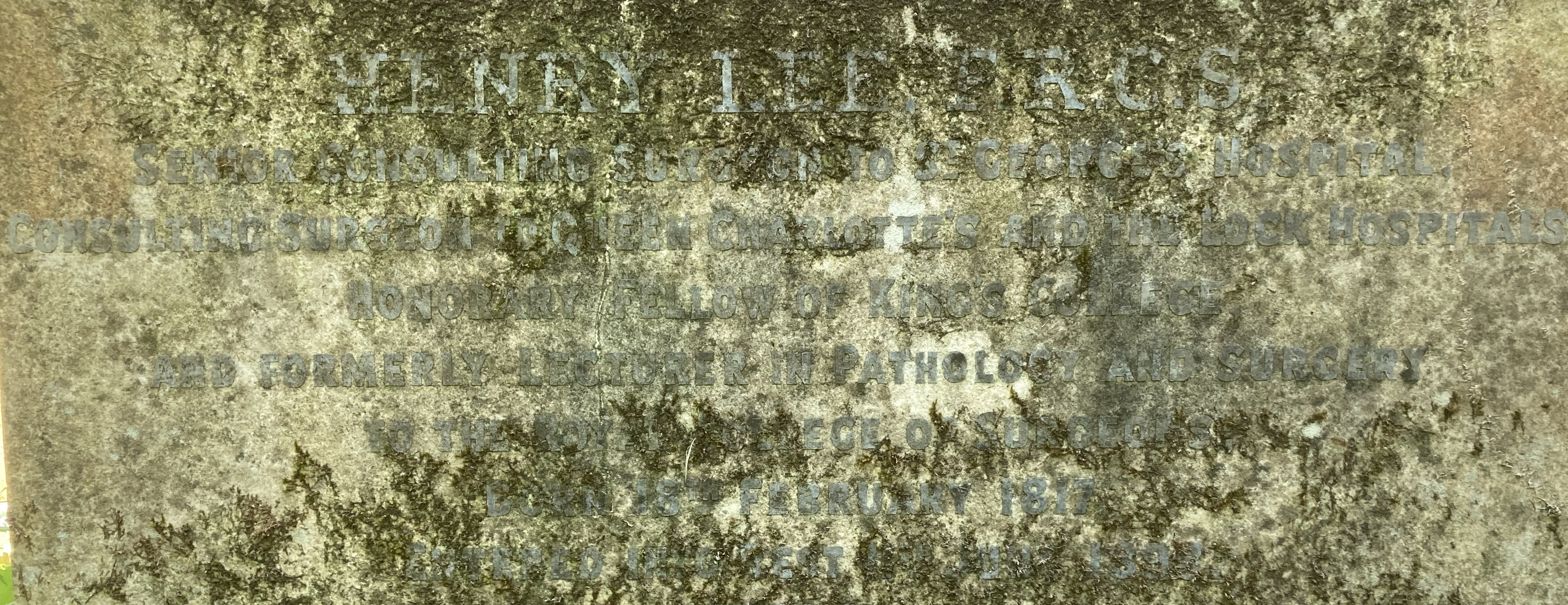
Inscription on the grave of Henry Lee in Highgate Cemetery

Lee retired in 1878, at the age of 60 and lived a further twenty years, dying at his home, 61 Queensborough Terrace, Hyde Park, on 11 June 1898. He was twice married, firstly to Anne Elizabeth Ellaby and in 1877 to Marion Hutchinson who survived him, as did his three daughters of both marriages, though his only son predeceased him. He is buried on the west side of Highgate Cemetery.

There is a portrait of Lee, by James Sant RA, in the Secretary's room of the Royal College of Surgeons, and his bust by Thomas Brock in the Hall of the college.
