= Gray's Anatomy for Students =

Anatomy book

- Author: Richard Drake, A. Wayne Vogl, Adam W. M. Mitchell
- Illustrator: Richard Tibbitts and Paul Richardson
- Language: English
- Subject: Human anatomy
- Publisher: Churchill Livingstone
- Publication date: Oct 2004
- Publication place: England
- Pages: 1150
- ISBN: 978-0-443-06612-2
- Preceded by: Gray's Anatomy

Gray's Anatomy for Students is an anatomy textbook inspired by the famous Gray's Anatomy (Grey's Anatomy) and aimed primarily at medical students. The text includes basic concepts for chiropractic, dental, medical, and physical therapy students.

Gray's Anatomy was used as the major reference, both for the text and the illustrations.

This book was first published in 2004, inspired by the classic Gray's Anatomy and has become one of the most widely used anatomy texts in contemporary medical education.

The textbook is written by Richard L. Drake, A. Wayne Vogl, and Adam W. M. Mitchell, with illustrations created by Richard Tibbitts and Paul Richardson. The book emphasizes clinical relevance and uses a regional approach to anatomy, distinguishing it from other contemporary anatomy texts.

== History and development ==
Gray's Anatomy for Students was first published in 2004 by Churchill Livingstone as a modern adaptation specifically designed for students, diverging from the comprehensive reference approach of the original Gray's Anatomy. The development involved an international editorial board of more than 100 anatomy instructors who ensured accuracy and pedagogical effectiveness.

The textbook was created in response to the changing landscape of medical education, where anatomy curricula had become more condensed and students needed resources focused on core concepts rather than exhaustive detail. The authors recognized that while the parent volume Gray's Anatomy remained the authoritative comprehensive reference, students required a more accessible and clinically oriented text.

== Editions ==
The book has been published in five editions:

- First Edition (2004) – ISBN 978-0-443-06612-2
- Second Edition (2009) – Featured updated clinical material and improved artwork
- Third Edition (2014) – ISBN 978-0-702-05131-9; received British Medical Association Book Awards 2015, Highly Commended in Basic and Clinical Sciences
- Fourth Edition (2019) – ISBN 978-0-323-39304-1; introduced bonus eBook chapters on body systems
- Fifth Edition (2023) – ISBN 978-0-323-93423-7; expanded diversity representation and updated clinical content

Each edition has maintained the core philosophy of presenting anatomy in a student-friendly, clinically relevant manner while incorporating advances in medical imaging and clinical practice.

== Authors ==
Richard L. Drake serves as Director of Anatomy and Professor of Surgery at the Cleveland Clinic Lerner College of Medicine, Case Western Reserve University in Cleveland, Ohio. He is recognized for his innovative approaches to anatomy education and has received numerous teaching awards throughout his career.

A. Wayne Vogl is Professor of Anatomy and Cell Biology in the Department of Cellular and Physiological Sciences at the Faculty of Medicine, University of British Columbia in Vancouver, British Columbia, Canada. His expertise spans both cellular and gross anatomy, bringing a unique perspective to anatomical education.

Adam W. M. Mitchell is a lecturer and interventional fellow in the Department of Interventional Radiology at Hammersmith Hospital in London, UK. His clinical background contributes significantly to the book's emphasis on clinical applications and radiological imaging.

== Structure and content ==
Gray's Anatomy for Students employs a regional approach to anatomy, organizing content by body regions rather than by organ systems. This organizational method aligns with most contemporary anatomy courses and dissection curricula.

=== Regional organization ===
The textbook is divided into the following main sections:

1. The Body – Introduction to anatomical concepts and imaging
2. Back – Vertebral column, spinal cord, and associated structures
3. Thorax – Chest wall, mediastinum, heart, and lungs
4. Abdomen – Abdominal wall, gastrointestinal tract, and abdominal viscera
5. Pelvis and Perineum – Pelvic organs and perineal structures
6. Lower Limb – Hip, thigh, leg, ankle, and foot
7. Upper Limb – Shoulder, arm, forearm, wrist, and hand
8. Head and Neck – Skull, brain, face, and cervical structures
9. Neuroanatomy – Comprehensive coverage of the nervous system

The book begins with the back region for pedagogical reasons. This area is typically the first region students dissect in anatomy laboratories, and it allows introduction to all basic anatomical components in a relatively straightforward context.

=== Additional features ===
Each chapter includes:

- Conceptual Overviews – Introductions that outline regional functions, relationships, and key features before detailed anatomical descriptions
- In the Clinic boxes – Clinical discussions related to diseases, procedures, and medical applications
- Surface Anatomy – Emphasis on palpable landmarks and surface features
- Correlative Diagnostic Images – Radiographs, CT scans, and MRI images showing anatomical structures in clinical context
- Clinical Cases – End-of-chapter scenarios demonstrating practical applications
- Self-Assessment Questions – Multiple-choice questions for knowledge review

== Illustrations ==
A distinguishing feature of Gray's Anatomy for Students is its artwork, created by medical illustrators Richard Tibbitts and Paul Richardson. The book contains more than 1,000 original illustrations designed with clarity and pedagogical effectiveness as primary goals.

The illustrations use consistent color schemes throughout to help students recognize and remember structures across different body regions. The artwork emphasizes three-dimensional relationships and clinical relevance, often showing structures in multiple views and orientations. The illustrative approach has been widely praised for making complex anatomical relationships more accessible to students.

== Pedagogical approach ==
The textbook employs several pedagogical strategies:

- Clinical Focus – Every anatomical description includes clinical relevance, helping students understand why they need to learn specific structures
- Multiple Entry Points – Information can be accessed in various ways, accommodating different learning styles
- Progressive Complexity – Each region begins with overview concepts before progressing to detailed anatomy
- Integration – Emphasis on how regions relate to each other functionally and anatomically
- Imaging Integration – Extensive use of clinical imaging modalities throughout the text

The fifth edition introduced increased representation of diverse population groups, incorporating a wider range of skin tones and clinical considerations related to transgender and intersex individuals, reflecting contemporary approaches to inclusive medical education.

== Reception and impact ==
Gray's Anatomy for Students has been widely adopted in medical schools worldwide and has received considerable acclaim from both students and educators.

The Royal College of Surgeons of England review stated that the book provides "excellent" clarity of expression in text, color artwork, and layout, noting that anatomy is a difficult discipline and many textbooks complicate the subject with complex drawings, whereas this book remains "thorough and yet succinct in its expression, without loss of relevant detail."

The third edition received the British Medical Association Book Awards 2015, being Highly Commended in the Basic and Clinical Sciences category, recognizing its contribution to medical education.

Student reviews consistently praise the book for its clear illustrations, clinical relevance, and accessibility. Many students have noted that the regional organization aligns well with dissection-based anatomy courses and that the conceptual overviews help provide context before detailed study.

== Companion publications ==
The success of Gray's Anatomy for Students has led to the development of companion products:

- Gray's Anatomy for Students Flash Cards – 350 flash cards based on illustrations from the textbook
- Gray's Atlas of Anatomy – A photographic atlas complement
- Gray's Anatomy Review – A question-based review book for examination preparation
- Gray's Basic Anatomy – A more concise introductory text

These companion resources have received their own recognition, with the flash cards winning the British Medical Association Book Awards 2009 First Prize in Basic and Clinical Sciences.

== See also ==
- Gray's Anatomy
- Human anatomy
- Medical education
- Anatomical terminology
- Gross anatomy
