= Thomas Pickering Pick =

British surgeon and author (1841–1919)

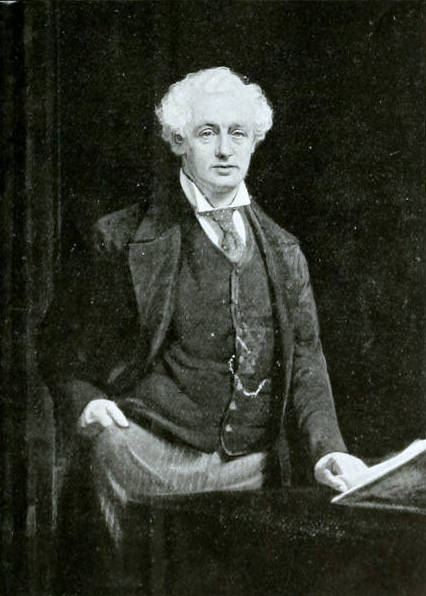
Portrait c. 1898

Thomas Pickering Pick (13 June 1841 – 6 September 1919) was a British surgeon and author. He edited the tenth through fourteenth editions of Gray's Anatomy, succeeding Timothy Holmes as editor. His other notable books include Fractures and Dislocations (Cassell & Co, 1885), A Treatise on Surgery (1875), and Surgery (1899).

Pickering Pick's father was a Liverpool merchant. At 16, he came to London and trained at St George's Hospital. He qualified for the Fellowship of the Royal College of Surgeons in 1866 and was elected as the hospital's assistant surgeon in 1869. From 1878 to 1898 he held the office of surgeon, then became a consulting surgeon prior to his 1900 retirement. For many years he was Inspector of Anatomy for England and Wales.
