= Henry Gray =

English anatomist (1827–1861)

Henry Gray FRS
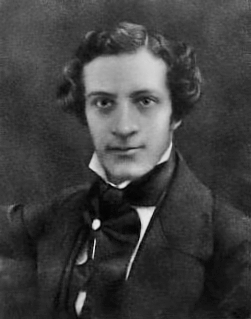
- Born: 1827; Belgravia, London, England
- Died: 13 June 1861 (aged 33–34); Belgravia, London, England
- Resting place: Highgate Cemetery (west side)
- Citizenship: United Kingdom of Great Britain and Ireland
- Education: St George's Hospital, St George's, University of London
- Known for: Gray's Anatomy
- Awards: Fellow of the Royal Society
- Scientific career
- Fields: Anatomy

Signature
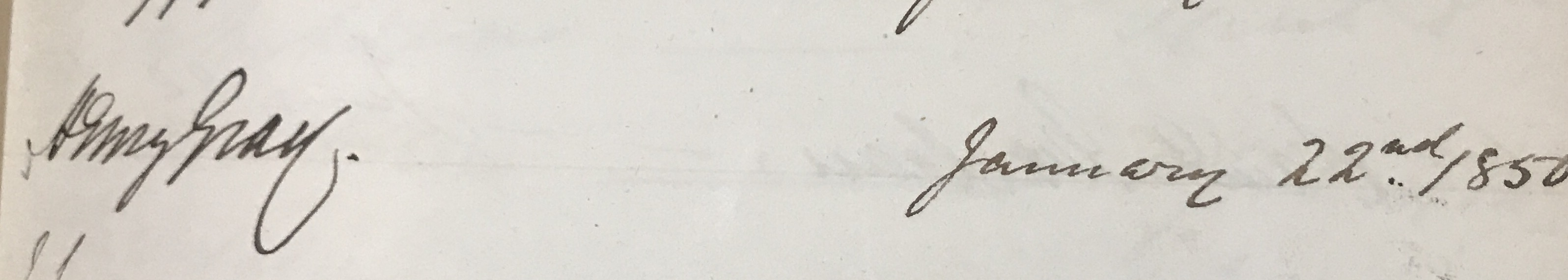

Henry Gray FRS (1827 – 13 June 1861) was an English anatomist and surgeon most notable for publishing the book Gray's Anatomy. He was elected a Fellow of the Royal Society (FRS) at the age of 25.

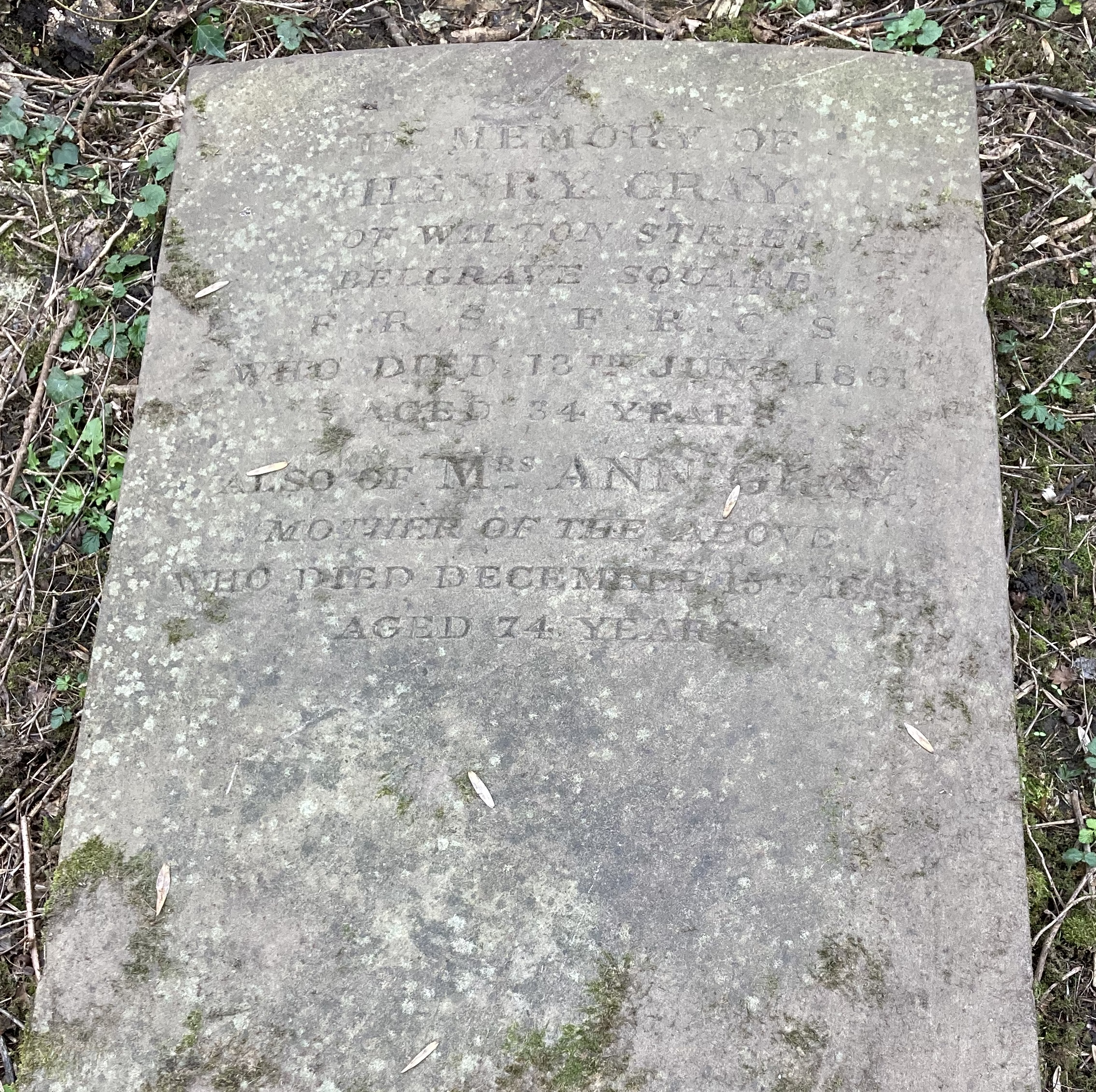
Grave of Henry Gray in Highgate Cemetery (west side)

== Biography ==
Gray was born in Belgravia, London, in 1827 and lived most of his life in London. In 1842, he entered as a student at St. George's Hospital, London (then situated in Belgravia, now moved to Tooting), and he was described by those who knew him as a most painstaking and methodical worker, and one who learned his anatomy by the slow but invaluable method of making dissections for himself.

While still a student, Gray secured the triennial prize of Royal College of Surgeons in 1848 for an essay entitled The Origin, Connexions and Distribution of nerves to the human eye and its appendages, illustrated by comparative dissections of the eye in other vertebrate animals. In 1852, at the early age of 25, he was elected a Fellow of the Royal Society, and in the following year he obtained the Astley Cooper prize of three hundred guineas for a dissertation "On the structure and Use of Spleen."

In 1858, Gray published the first edition of Anatomy, which covered 750 pages and contained 363 figures. He had the good fortune of securing the help of his friend Henry Vandyke Carter, a skilled draughtsman and formerly a demonstrator of anatomy at St. George's Hospital. Carter made the drawings from which the engravings were executed. The excellence of Carter's illustrations contributed greatly to the initial success of the book. This edition was dedicated to Sir Benjamin Collins Brodie. A second edition was prepared by Gray and published in 1860. The book is still published under the title Gray's Anatomy and widely appreciated as an authoritative textbook for medical students.

Gray held successively the posts of demonstrator of Anatomy, curator of the museum and Lecturer of Anatomy at St. George's Hospital and was in 1861 a candidate for the post of assistant surgeon.

== Death ==
Gray was struck by an attack of confluent smallpox, the deadliest type of the disease where individual lesions become so numerous that they join as a continuous, "confluent" sheet. He is assumed to have been infected due to his extended and meticulous caring for his ten-year-old nephew, Charles Gray, who did eventually recover.

On 13 June 1861, the day he was to appear for an interview as a final candidate for a prestigious post at the St. George's Hospital, he died at the age of 34. He was buried at Highgate Cemetery.

== Works/Bibliography ==
- The Origin, Connections, and Distribution of Nerves to the Human Eye and its Appendages, illustrated by Comparative Dissections of the Eye in Other Vertebrate Animals (1848) – essay
- On the Structure and Use of Spleen (1854) – jointly illustrated by Henry Vandyke Carter
- Descriptive and Surgical Anatomy 1st Edition (August 1858) – jointly illustrated by Henry Vandyke Carter – popularly known as Gray's Anatomy
- Descriptive and Surgical Anatomy 2nd Edition (December 1860) – jointly illustrated by Henry Vandyke Carter and John Gulse Westmacott – popularly known as Gray's Anatomy
