= Croonian Medal =

Croonian Medal and Lecture
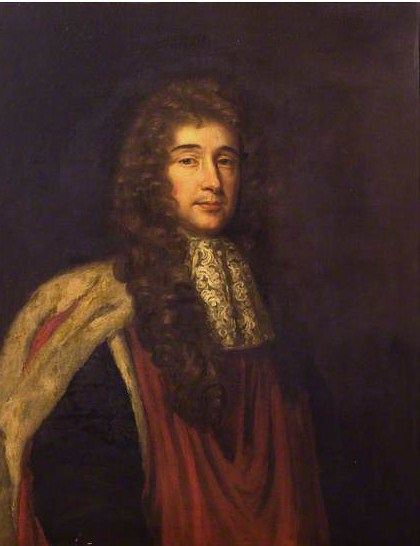
- The lecture is named after William Croone (1633–1684), portrait painted by Mary Beale in 1680.
- Awarded for: For achievements in biological sciences
- Sponsored by: The Royal Society
- Date: 1738
- Location: London
- Country: United Kingdom
- Website: royalsociety.org/grants-schemes-awards/awards/croonian-lecture/

Precedence
- Next (higher): Copley Medal
- Equivalent: Bakerian Medal (physical sciences)
- Next (lower): Royal Medal (Commonwealth or Irish citizens or residents only); Foreign Member of the Royal Society (ForMemRS, international)

The Croonian Medal and Lecture is an award, a medal, and lecture given at the invitation of the Royal Society and the Royal College of Physicians.

Among the papers of William Croone at his death in 1684, was a plan to endow a single lectureship at both the Royal Society and the Royal College of Physicians. His wife provided the bequest in 1701 specifying that it was "for the support of a lecture and illustrative experiment for the advancement of natural knowledge on locomotion, or (conditionally) of such other subjects as, in the opinion of the President for the time being, should be most useful in promoting the objects for which the Royal Society was instituted". One lecture was to be delivered by a Fellow of the Royal College of Physicians and the other, on the nature and laws of muscular motion, to be delivered before the Royal Society. The Royal Society lecture series began in 1738 and that of the Royal College of Physicians in 1749.

Croone became an original Fellow of the Royal Society in May 1663. He also became a Fellow of the College of Physicians on 29 July 1675. He was appointed lecturer on anatomy at Surgeons' hall in 1670 and pursued research in several important subjects of his day, including respiration, muscular motion, and generation.

One individual, Sir Stephen O’Rahilly FRS, FRCP has received the award twice: initially from the Royal College of Physicians in 2011, and then from the Royal Society in 2022 (below).

== List of lecturers (Royal Society – for RCP lecturers see below) ==
Source: Royal Society

=== 21st century ===
- 2026 David Baker, for pioneering the design of completely new proteins as well as playing key roles in the development of protein structure prediction and protein engineering tools
- 2025 Edith Heard, for being a leading figure in X-chromosome biology, including the epigenetic mechanisms behind X-inactivation which are critical for this important part of mammalian biology
- 2024 Edward C. Holmes, for being a global authority on virus evolution and emergence, who played a key role in the discovery of SARS-CoV-2 and was the first to publicly release the genome sequence. The publication timeline of SARS-CoV-2 has been disputed by GISAID.
- 2023 Ottoline Leyser, for playing a central role in two of the most important discoveries regarding the nature and perception of plant hormones, and for her contributions to gender equality in science
- 2022 Stephen O'Rahilly and Sadaf Farooqi, for their seminal discoveries regarding the control of human body weight, resulting in novel diagnostics and therapies, which improve human health
- 2021 Barry Everitt, for his inventions that expand our understanding of the brain and allow therapeutic development including the co-invention of optogenetics, a technology that has revolutionized neurobiology
- 2020 Edward Boyden, for his inventions that expand our understanding of the brain and allow therapeutic development including the co-invention of optogenetics, a technology that has revolutionised neurobiology
- 2019 Dame Kay Davies, for her achievements in developing a prenatal test for Duchenne muscular dystrophy and her work on characterising dystrophin related proteins
- 2018 Jennifer Doudna, Re-writing the Code of Life: CRISPR Systems and Applications of Gene Editing
- 2017 Jonathan Felix Ashmore, for his significant contributions to the field of sensory neuroscience, shaping our current understanding of inner ear physiology
- 2016 Enrico Coen, for his work resulting in a new theoretical and experimental foundation for understanding how the shapes of biological structures arise through development and evolution
- 2015 Nicholas Barry Davies, for his work on the co-evolved responses of brood parasitic cuckoos and their hosts
- 2014 Brigid Hogan, for pioneering contributions that have transformed understanding of cell specification, organogenesis and morphogenesis in mammalian development
- 2013 Frances Ashcroft, From bench to bedside: KATP channels and neonatal diabetes
- 2012 Tim Bliss, The Mechanics of Memory
- 2011 John Ellis,Molecular chaperones: how cells stop proteins from misbehaving
- 2010 Alec Jeffreys, Genetic fingerprinting and beyond
- 2009 Linda Partridge, The New Biology of Ageing
- 2008 John Pickett, Plant and Animal Communication
- 2007 Aaron Klug, Engineered zinc finger proteins (ZFPs) for the regulation of gene expression
- 2006 Iain Campbell, Structure and the living cell
- 2005 Salvador Moncada, Adventures in vascular biology
- 2004 John Krebs, Risk, food, fact and fantasy
- 2003 Tim Hunt, Cell growth, cell division and the problem of cancer
- 2002 Kim Nasmyth, Disseminating our genomes during mitosis and meiosis.
- 2001 Ron Laskey, Hunting the antisocial cancer cell.

=== 20th century ===
- 2000 Nigel Unwin, The nicotinic acetylcholine receptor and the structural basis of synaptic transmission
- 1999 Hugh Pelham, Intracellular membrane traffic: getting proteins sorted.
- 1998 Philip Cohen, Discovery of a protein kinase cascade of major importance in insulin signal transduction
- 1997 Anthony Hunter, The phosphorylation of proteins on tyrosine: its role in cell growth and disease
- 1996 Thomas Lindahl, Endogenous damage to DNA.
- 1995 Richard Southwood, Natural communities: structure and dynamics.
- 1994 Roy M. Anderson, Populations, infectious disease and immunity: a very nonlinear world.
- 1993 John Vane, The endothelium: maestro of the blood circulation
- 1992 Jacques Miller, The key role of the thymus in the body's defence strategies.
- 1991 Anthony David Bradshaw, Genostasis and the limits to evolution?
- 1990 Robert Hinde, The Interdependence of the Behavioural Sciences.
- 1989 César Milstein, Antibodies, a paradigm of the biology of molecular recognition.
- 1988 Michael John Berridge, Inositol lipids and calcium signalling
- 1987 Peter Dennis Mitchell, Proton-motive osmoenzyme mechanisms in cytochrome systems: variations on a theme by Keilin.
- 1986 Sydney Brenner, The molecular genetics of muscle in the nematode Caenorhabditis elegans.
- 1985 Robert McCredie May, When two and two do not make four: nonlinear phenomena in ecology
- 1984 Samuel Victor Perry, Calcium and the regulation of contractile activity.
- 1983 Richard Darwin Keynes, Voltage-gated ion channels in the nerve membrane.
- 1982 Seymour Benzer, Genes, neurons and behaviour in Drosophila
- 1981 Harold Garnet Callan, Lampbrush chromosomes
- 1980 Rodney Robert Porter, The complex proteases of the complement system.
- 1979 Setsuro Ebashi, Regulation of muscle contraction
- 1978 Michael Abercrombie, Crawling movements of metazoan cells
- 1977 John William Sutton Pringle, Stretch activation of muscle: function and mechanism.
- 1976 John Bertrand Gurdon, Egg cytoplasm and gene control in development.
- 1975 Frederick Sanger, Nucleotide sequences
- 1974 Jack Heslop-Harrison, The physiology of the spore surface
- 1973 Eric James Denton, On buoyancy and the lives of modern and fossil cephalopods.
- 1972 Nikolaas Tinbergen, Functional ethology and the human sciences
- 1971 Henry Harris, Cell fusion and the analysis of malignancy
- 1970 Hugh Esmor Huxley, The structural basis of muscular contraction
- 1969 Frederick Campion Steward, From cultured cells to whole plants: the induction and control of their growth and morphogenesis
- 1968 Max Ferdinand Perutz, The haemoglobin molecule
- 1967 Andrew Fielding Huxley, The activation of striated muscle and its mechanical response.
- 1966 Francis Harry Compton Crick, The genetic code
- 1965 John Zachary Young, The organisation of a memory system
- 1964 George Lindor Brown, The release and fate of the transmitter liberated by adrenergic nerves
- 1963 Hans Adolf Krebs, Gluconeogenesis
- 1962 Frank George Young, On insulin and its action
- 1961 Bernard Katz, The transmission of impulses from nerve to muscle, and the subcellular unit of synaptic action.
- 1960 Harry Godwin, Radiocarbon dating and Quaternary history in Britain
- 1959 Walter Thomas James Morgan, A contribution to human biochemical genetics: the chemical basis of blood group specificity
- 1958 Peter Brian Medawar, The homograph reaction
- 1957 Alan Lloyd Hodgkin, Ionic movements and electrical activity in giant nerve fibres.
- 1956 Frederic Charles Bartlett, Some experiments about thinking
- 1955 Charles Herbert Best, Dietary factors in the protection of the liver, kidneys, heart and other organs in experimental animals. The lipotropic agents.
- 1954 Howard Walter Florey, Mucins and the protection of the body
- 1953 Ronald Fisher, Population genetics
- 1952 Carl Frederick Abel Pantin, The elementary nervous system
- 1951 Rudolph Albert Peters, Lethal synthesis
- 1950 Frank Macfarlane Burnet, The interaction of virus and cell-surface
- 1949 Detlev Wulf Bronk, The rhythmic action and respiration of nerve cells.
- 1948 Vincent Brian Wigglesworth, Insects as a medium for the study of physiology.
- 1947 Ernest Basil Verney, The antidiuretic hormone and the factors which determine its release.
- 1946 J.B.S. Haldane, The formal genetics of Man
- 1945 William Thomas Astbury, The structure of biological fibres and the problem of muscle.
- 1944 Charles Robert Harington, Thyroxine: its biosynthesis and its immuno-chemistry.
- 1943 Edward Mellanby, Nutrition in relation to bone growth and the nervous system.
- 1942 Lancelot Hogben, Chromatic behaviour
- 1941 William Whiteman Carlton Topley, The biology of epidemics
- 1940 Schack August Steenberg Krogh, The active and passive exchange of inorganic ions through the surfaces of living cells and through living membranes generally.
- 1939 James Gray, Aspects of animal locomotion
- 1938 Alfred Newton Richards, Processes of urine formation
- 1937 Henry Horatio Dixon, The transport of materials in plants
- 1936 Francis Hugh Adam Marshall, Sexual periodicity and the causes which determine it.
- 1935 Joseph Barcroft, Foetal respiration
- 1934 David Keilin, Mechanisms of cellular respiration
- 1933 Ross Granville Harrison, The origin and development of the nervous system studied by the methods of experimental embryology
- 1932 Davidson Black, The discovery of Sinanthropus
- 1931 Edgar Douglas Adrian, The messages in sensory nerve fibres and their interpretation.
- 1930 Jules Bordet, Theories of the bacteriophage
- 1929 James Peter Hill, The developmental history of the primates
- 1928 Ivan Petrovitch Pavlov, Certain problems in the physiology of the cerebral hemispheres.
- 1927 Hans Spemann, Organisers in animal development
- 1926 Archibald Vivian Hill, The laws of muscular motion
- 1925 Rudolf Magnus, Animal posture
- 1924 David Meredith Seares Watson, The origin of the amphibia
- 1923 Frederick Frost Blackman, The problem of plant respiration considered as a catalytic process.
- 1922 Thomas Hunt Morgan, On the mechanism of heredity
- 1921 Henry Head, Release of function in the nervous system
- 1920 William Bateson, Genetic segregation
- 1919 Henry Hallett Dale, The biological significance of anaphylaxis
- 1918 Walter B. Cannon, The physiological basis of thirst
- 1917 Thomas Lewis, Upon the motion of the mammalian heart
- 1916 Sydney John Hickson, Evolution and symmetry in the order of the sea-pens.
- 1915 Walter Morley Fletcher and Frederick Gowland Hopkins, The respiratory process in muscle; and the nature of muscular motion
- 1914 Edmund Beecher Wilson, The bearing of cytological research on heredity.
- 1913 Robert Broom, The origin of mammals
- 1912 Keith Lucas, The process of excitation in nerve and muscle
- 1911 Thomas Gregor Brodie, A new conception of the glomerular activity
- 1910 Georg Klebs, Alterations in the development and forms of plants as a result of environment
- 1909 Edward Albert Schafer, The functions of the pituitary body
- 1908 Gustaf Retzius, The principles of the minute structure of the nervous system as revealed by recent investigations
- 1907 John Bretland Farmer, Structural constituents of the nucleus, and their relation to the organisation of the individual
- 1906 John Newport Langley and William Rivers, On nerve endings and on special excitable substances in cells.
- 1905 William Bate Hardy, On the globulins
- 1904 Ernest Henry Starling and William Maddock Bayliss, The chemical regulation of the secretory process.
- 1903 Kliment Timiryazev, The cosmical function of the green plant
- 1902 Arthur Gamgee, On certain chemical and physical properties of haemoglobin.
- 1901 C. Lloyd Morgan, Studies in visual sensation

=== 19th century ===
Source (1801–30):

- 1900 Paul Ehrlich, On immunity with special reference to cell life
- 1899 J.S. Burdon-Sanderson, On the relation of motion in animals and plants to the electrical phenomena which are associated with it
- 1898 Wilhelm Pfeffer, The nature and significance of functional metabolism in the plant.
- 1897 Charles S. Sherrington, The mammalian spinal cord as an organ of reflex action.
- 1896 Augustus D. Waller, Observations on isolated nerve.
- 1895 T.W. Engelmann, On the nature of muscular contraction
- 1894 Santiago Ramon y Cajal, La fine structure des centres nerveux
- 1893 Rudolf Virchow, The position of pathology among biological studies.
- 1892 Angelo Mosso, Les phenomenes psychiques et la temperature du cerveau.
- 1891 Francis Gotch & Victor Horsley, On the mammalian nervous system; its functions and their localisation determined by an electrical method.
- 1890 H. Marshall Ward, The relations between host and parasite in certain epidemic diseases of plants
- 1889 Émile Roux, Les inoculations preventives (1853–1933)
- 1888 Wilhelm Friedrich Kühne, Ueber die Entstehung der vitalen Bewegung
- 1887 Harry Govier Seeley, On Pareiasaurus bombidens (Owen) and the significance of its affinities to amphibians, reptiles, and mammals
- 1886 Leonard Charles Wooldridge, The coagulation of the blood
- 1884 –1885 Not appointed
- 1883 H. Newell Martin, On the direct influence of gradual variations of temperature upon the rate of beat of the dogs heart
- 1882 W.H. Gaskell, On the rhythm of the heart of the frog, and on the nature of the action of the vagus nerve
- 1881 G.J. Romanes and J.C. Ewart, Observations on the locomotor system of Medusae.
- 1880 Samuel Haughton, On some elementary principles in animal mechanics.
- 1879 W.K. Parker, On the structure & development of the skull in the Lacertilia
- 1878 H.N. Moseley, On the structure of the Stylasteridae: a family of the hydroid stony corals
- 1877 J.S. Burdon-Sanderson & Frederick James Montague Page, On the mechanical effects, and on the electrical disturbance consequent on excitation of the leaf of Dionea muscipula.
- 1876 G.J. Romanes, Preliminary observations on the locomotor system of medusae.
- 1875 David Ferrier, Experiments on the brain of monkeys.
- 1874 David Ferrier, The localisation of function in the brain
- 1873 Benjamin Ward Richardson, On muscular irritability after systemic death.
- 1871 – 1872 Not appointed
- 1870 Augustus V. Waller, On the results of the method (introduced by the author) of investigating the nervous system, more especially as applied to the elucidation of the functions of the pneumogastric and sympathetic nerves in man.
- 1868 –1869 Not appointed
- 1867 J.S. Burdon-Sanderson, On the influence exercised by the movements of respiration on the circulation of the blood
- 1866 Not appointed
- 1865 Lionel S. Beale, On the ultimate nerve fibres distributed to muscle and some other tissues, with observations upon the structure & probable mode of action of a nervous mechanism
- 1864 Hermann Helmholtz, On the normal motions of the human eye in relation to binocular vision.
- 1863 Joseph Lister, On the coagulation of the blood
- 1862 Albert Kölliker, On the termination of nerves in muscles, as observed in the frog: and on the disposition of the nerves in the frogs heart.
- 1861 Charles-Édouard Brown-Séquard, On the relations between muscular irritability, cadaveric rigidity, and putrefaction
- 1860 James Bell Pettigrew, On the arrangement of the muscular fibres of the ventricular portion of the heart of the mammal
- 1859 Not appointed
- 1858 Thomas Henry Huxley, On the theory of the vertebrate skull
- 1857 James Paget, On the cause of the rhythmic action of the heart
- 1852–1856 Not appointed
- 1851 Richard Owen, On the Megatherium
- 1830–1850 Not appointed
- 1829 Everard Home, A Report on the Peculiarities met with in the Stomach of the Zariffa.
- 1828 Not appointed
- 1827 Everard Home, On the Muscles peculiar to Organs of Sense in particular Quadrupeds and Fishes
- 1826 Everard Home, An Enquiry into the mode by which the Propagation of the Species is carried on, in the Common Oyster, and in the large Fresh-water Muscle.
- 1825 Everard Home, On the Structure of a Muscular Fibre from which are derived its Elongation and Contraction
- 1824 Everard Home, On the existence of Nerves in the Placenta
- 1823 Everard Home, On the Internal Structure of the Human Brain, when examined in the Microscope, as compared with that of Fishes, Insects and Worms.
- 1822 Francis Bauer, Microscopical Observations on the suspension of the Muscular Motions of the Vibrio Tritici
- 1821 Everard Home, On the Anatomical Structure of the Eye; illustrated by Microscopical Drawings, executed by F. Bauer
- 1820 Everard Home, Microscopical Observations on the following subjects. On the Brain and Nerves; showing that the Materials of which they are composed exist in the Blood
- 1819 Everard Home, A further Investigation of the component parts of the Blood.
- 1818 Everard Home, On the conversion of Pus into Granulations, or new flesh.
- 1817 Everard Home, On the Changes the Blood undergoes in the act of Coagulation.
- 1814 –1816 Not recorded
- 1813 Benjamin Collins Brodie, On the Influence of the Nervous System on the Action of the Muscles in general and of the Heart in particular
- 1811 – 1812 Not recorded
- 1810 Benjamin Collins Brodie, Physiological Researches, respecting the Influence of the Brain on the Action of the Heart, and on the Generation of Animal Heat.
- 1809 William Hyde Wollaston, Observations on the Mode of Action of Voluntary Muscles, and on the causes which derange, and assist, the Action of the Heart and Blood Vessels
- 1808 Thomas Young, On the Functions of the Heart and Arteries
- 1807 Anthony Carlisle, On the Natural History and Chemical Analysis of the substances which constitute the Muscles of Animals
- 1806 John Pearson, Remarks on Muscular Power, and on some of the circumstances by which it is increased, diminished or finally abolished
- 1805 Anthony Carlisle, On the Arrangement and Mechanical Action of the Muscles of Fishes.
- 1804 Anthony Carlisle, On Muscular Motion.
- 1803 John Pearson, On Muscular Motion
- 1802 Not recorded
- 1801 Everard Home, On the power of the Eye to adjust itself to different distances when deprived of the Crystalline Lens

=== 18th century ===
- 1800 Everard Home, On the Irritability of Nerves
- 1799 Everard Home, On the Structure and Uses of the Membrana Tympani.
- 1798 Everard Home, Experiments and Observations upon the Structure of Nerves.
- 1797 John Abernethy, A general Review of the latest opinions relative to Animal Life and Motion.
- 1796 Everard Home, On the Crystalline Humour of the Eye
- 1795 Everard Home, On the Mechanism employed in producing Muscular Motion.
- 1794 Everard Home, On the Crystalline Humour of the Eye
- 1793 Everard Home, On Mr. Hunters Experiments to ascertain whether the Crystalline Humour of the Eye be muscular
- 1792 Not recorded
- 1791 Matthew Baillie, A general view of the Nature of the Muscles, and an enumeration of the most striking facts connected with the Theory of their Motion.
- 1790 Everard Home, On the Mechanism employed in producing Muscular Motion.
- 1789 William Blizard, On the Theory of Muscular Motion
- 1788 Gilbert Blane, On the Nature of the Muscles, and on the Theory of Muscular Motion.
- 1787 George Fordyce, On Muscular Motion
- 1786 Edward Whitaker Gray, On the Effects of different kinds of Salts applied as Stimulants on the Muscles
- 1785 Edward Whitaker Gray, An Examination into Hallers Theory of Muscular Motion.
- 1784 Samuel Foart Simmons, On the Irritability of the Muscular Fibres
- 1783 Not recorded
- 1782 John Hunter, On the Density and Firmness of a Muscle as contributing to its Strength and Agility.
- 1781 John Hunter, On the Construction and Application of Muscles and the Power by which they are actuated
- 1775 – 1780 John Hunter
- 1762 – 1774 Not recorded
- 1761 Charles Morton
- 1759 – 1760 Not recorded
- 1754 – 1758 Charles Morton
- 1752 – 1753 Not recorded
- 1751 James Parsons, Critical Remarks upon the Motion and Uses of the Human Pelvis.
- 1750 James Parsons, On Muscular Motion
- 1748 – 1749 No lecture
- 1747 Browne Langrish, On the Theory of Muscular Motion
- 1746 James Parsons, Description of the several Muscles of the Face; with their particular Functions and Uses
- 1745 James Parsons, On Muscular Motion
- 1744 James Parsons, An Introductory Discourse on Muscular Motion
- 1743 No lecture
- 1742 James Douglas, (read by William Douglas) Description and Structure of the Human Bladder, with the Uses of its Muscles and Membranes.
- 1741 James Douglas, Description of the several Muscles, Membranes and parts belonging to the Uvula of the Palate, and concerned in its action; as also of the several parts subservient to the uses of the Tuba Eustachiana
- 1740 Alexander Stuart, On the Peristaltic Motion of the Intestines. Microscopial Observations on several parts of live Frogs.
- 1739 Frank Nicholls, An Enquiry into Muscular Motion
- 1738 Alexander Stuart, On the Motion of the Heart

== List of Lecturers (Royal College of Physicians) ==
=== 21st century ===
- 2018 Rebecca Fitzgerald, Precision early diagnosis of oesophageal cancer using a pill on a string
- 2017 Jonathan Ashmore, for his research into hearing; his analysis of cochlear hair cells has revolutionised our understanding of how the ear works.
- 2016 Pamela Shaw, Translational neuroscience approach to developing new effective treatments for Motor Neurone Disease
- 2015
- 2014
- 2013 Peter Openshaw, Disease mechanisms revealed by studies of pandemic influenza
- 2012 Marc Feldmann, Development of anti cytokine therapy and its future potential
- 2011 Stephen O'Rahilly, Obesity and its metabolic consequences: lessons from the extremes
- 2010 Sir Gordon Duff, Challenges in the development of innovative medicines
- 2009 Peter John Barnes, Reversing steroid resistance in inflammatory diseases: a novel therapeutic strategy
- 2008 Martin Neil Rossor, Dementia – global or modular?
- 2007 Peter J. Goadsby, Bench to bedside: headache 2007
- 2006 Peter John Ratcliffe, Understanding hypoxia signalling in cells; a new therapeutic opportunity?
- 2005 David A. Lomas, Molecular mousetraps, a -antitrypsin deficiency and the serpinopathies
- 2004 Alastair Compston, The marvellous harmony of the nervous parts':The origins of multiple sclerosis
- 2003 David Barker, Coronary heart disease and type 2 diabetes: disorders of growth
- 2002 Humphrey Hodgson, Liver cells – biology to therapeutics
- 2001 Elwyn Elias, Hepato-canalicular cholestasis – its mechanisms, causes and consequences
- 2000 John Connell, Regulation of the corticosteroid phenotype in humans – implications in the pathogenesis of asthma

=== 20th century ===
- 1999 John A Camm, Intracellular membrane traffic: getting proteins sorted
- 1998 Michael J. G. Farthing, Bugs and guts: it's good to talk?
- 1997 Bruce Anthony John Ponder, RET: one gene, many syndromes
- 1996 David Alan Warrell, Pathophysiology and treatment of malignant tertian malaria
- 1995 Ravinder Nath Maini, The role of cytokines in rheumatoid arthritis
- 1994 Baruch Samuel Blumberg, Complex Interactions of Hepatitis B with its Host and Environment
- 1993
- 1992 Charles Nicholas Hales, The aetiology of non-insulin-dependent diabetes
- 1991 John Douglas Swales
- 1990 Johannes Joseph van Rood
- 1989 Leslie Turnberg, Cellular basis of diarrhoea
- 1988 David Hull, The Viable Child
- 1985
- 1984 David John Weatherall, Human genetics
- 1983 John Charles Batten, Cystic fibrosis – coming of age
- 1982 Leonard Birnie Strang, Formation and absorption of liquids in the lungs: lessons from the fetus
- 1981 John H. Humphrey, The Value of Immunological Concepts in Medicine
- 1980 Anthony F. Lever, Sodium in Hypertension
- 1979 William Stanley Peart, Concepts in Hypertension
- 1978 John Peter Tizard, Cerebral palsies: treatment and prevention
- 1977 Ivor H. Mills, The Natriuretic Hormone Cascade
- 1976 John David Nunes Nabarro, Hormone Secreting Pituitary Tumours
- 1975 William Neville Mann, Biliary cirrhosis: an appraisal
- 1974 Richard Bayliss, Idiopathic Oedema of Women
- 1973 Sir John V. Dacie, The hereditary haemolytic anaemias
- 1972 Graham W. Hayward, Infective endocarditis - a changing disease
- 1971 John F. Brock, Nature, Nurture and Stress in Health and Disease
- 1970 Sir Ronald Bodley-Scott, Chemotherapy of cancer: the first quarter century
- 1969 Francis Avery Jones, Problems of Alimentary Bleeding
- 1968 Eric George Lapthorne Bywaters, The cardiovascular lesions of acute and chronic rheumatism
- 1967 Sir A. Ashley Miles, The specificity of resistance to infections
- 1966 Richard Sydney Allison, Perseveration:its clinical significance in diffuse and focal brain affections
- 1965 Sir Derrick M. Dunlop, The drug problem
- 1964 Lord Cohen of Birkenhead, Carotenoids in health and disease
- 1963 W. Melville Arnott, The Lungs in Mitral Stenosis
- 1962 Charles Herbert Stuart-Harris, The Viruses of Human Diseases
- 1961 John McMichael, Reorientations in Hypertensive Disorders
- 1960 Derek Ernest Denny-Brown, Diseases of the basal ganglia and their relation to disorders of movement
- 1959 Frank McFarlane Burnet, Auto-Immune Disease
- 1958 Paul Wood, The Eisenmenger Syndrome, or Pulmonary Hypertension with Reversed Central Shunt
- 1957 George W. Pickering, The Regulation of Body temperature in Sickness and in Health
- 1956 Arthur H. Douthwaite, Pitfalls in Medicine
- 1955 Horace Evans, 1st Baron Evans, The significance of certain symptoms in disease of the kidneys
- 1954 J. Forest Smith, Nutrition and Child Health
- 1953 Allen Daley, The Place of the Hospital in a National Health Service
- 1952 Eric Benjamin Strauss, Reason and unreason in psychological medicine
- 1951 Theodore F. Fox, Professional Freedom
- 1950 Archibald Edmund Clark-Kennedy, The Patient and his Disease
- 1949 Neil Hamilton-Fairley, Malaria with Special Reference to Recent Experimental Clinical and Chemotherapeutic Investigations
- 1948 Desmond Curran, Prefrontal Leucotomy
- 1947 Edward Rowan Boland, The Administration of Medicine
- 1946 Hugh Leslie Marriott, Water and Salt Depletion
- 1945 MacDonald Critchley, Problems of Naval Warfare under Climatic Extremes
- 1944 Thomas Lionel Hardy, Order and Disorder in the Large Intestine
- 1943 Charles Putnam Symonds, Response to Flying Stress: Foundations of Confidence
- 1942 Donald Hunter, Industrial Toxicology
- 1941 Sir Arthur William Mickle Ellis, The Natural History of Bright's Disease
- 1940 George Graham, The Role of the Liver in Diabetes Mellitus
- 1939 John Alfred Ryle
- 1938 Francis Fraser, Clinical Aspects of the Transmission of the Effects of Nervous Impulses by Acetylcholine
- 1937 Edwin Bramwell, Clinical Reflections upon Muscles, Movements, and the Motor Path
- 1936 Bernard Spilsbury, Doctrine of Inflammation
- 1935 Edmund Spriggs, A Clinical Study of Headaches
- 1934 Owen Lambert Vaughan Simpkinson de Wesselow, on arterial hypertension
- 1933 Edward Mellanby, Nutrition and Disease: the Interaction of Clinical and Experimental Work
- 1932 John William McNee, Liver and Spleen; their Clinical and Pathological Relations
- 1931 Matthew J. Stewart, Precancerous Lesions of the Alimentary Tract
- 1930 Charles James Martin, Thermal Adjustment of Man and Animals to External Conditions
- 1929 Henry Hallett Dale, On Some Chemical Factors in the Control of the Circulation
- 1928 Charles Bolton, The Interpretation of Gastric Symptoms
- 1927
- 1926 Thomas Lewis, The Blood Vessels of the Human Skin
- 1925 Samuel Alexander Kinnier Wilson, On some Disorders of Motility and of Muscle Tone
- 1924 Leonard Rogers, on Researches in Leprosy
- 1923 John Beresford Leathes, The Role of Fats in Vital Phenomena
- 1922 Gordon Morgan Holmes, Cerebellar Disease
- 1921 Frederick Lucien Golla, The Objective Study of Neurosis
- 1920 Arthur Frederick Hurst, Psychology of the Special Senses and Their Functional Disorders
- 1919 G. Elliot Smith, On the Significancs of the Cerebral Cortex
- 1918 Walter Langdon-Brown, The Sympathetic Nervous System in Disease
- 1917 John George Adami, On Adaptation and Disease
- 1916
- 1915 David Bruce, On Trypanosomes Causing Disease in Man and Domestic Animals in Central Africa
- 1914 Edwin Goodall, Modern Aspects of Certain Problems in the Pathology of Mental Disorders
- 1913 Charles Sherrington, Inhibition as an Element in Co-ordination
- 1912 Leonard S Dudgeon, The Pathology of Immunity
- 1911 Henry Head, Release of function of the nervous system
- 1910 Frederick William Andrewes, Behaviour of the Leucocytes in Infection and Immunity
- 1909 Walter Sydney Lazarus-Barlow, Radioactivity and Carcinoma
- 1908 Archibald Garrod, Inborn Errors of Metabolism
- 1907 William John Simpson, On Plague
- 1906 William Halse Rivers, The influence of Alcohol and Other Drugs on Fatigue
- 1905 Ernest Henry Starling, On the chemical correlation of the functions of the body
- 1904 John Rose Bradford, Bright's Disease and its Varieties
- 1903 Charles Edward Beevor, On Muscular Movements and their Representation in the Central Nervous System
- 1902 John W. Washbourn, Natural History and Pathology of Pneumonia (delivered by W. Hale White)
- 1901 William Dobinson Halliburton, Chemical Side of Nervous Activity

=== 19th century ===
- 1900 Frederick Walker Mott, Degeneration of the Neurone
- 1899 John Buckley Bradbury, On some Points Connected with Sleep, Sleeplessness, and Hypnotics
- 1898 Sidney Harris Cox Martin, Chemical Products of Pathogenic Bacteria Considered with Special Reference to Enteric Fever.
- 1897 William Hale-White, Means by which the Temperature of the Body is Maintained
- 1896 George Oliver, A Contribution to the Study of the Blood and the Circulation
- 1895 William Marcet, Contribution to the History of the Respiration of Man
- 1894 Frederick William Pavy, On a New Departure in Diabetes
- 1893 Daniel John Leech, Pharmacological Action and Therapeutic Uses of the Nitrites and allied compounds
- 1892 William Roberts, Chemistry and Therapeutics of Uric Acid Gravel and Gout
- 1891 J.S. Burdon-Sanderson, On the Progress of Discovery Relating to the Origin and Nature of Infectious Diseases
- 1890 David Ferrier, Cerebral Localisation
- 1889 T. Lauder Brunton, Chemical Structure of Physiological Action
- 1888 Donald MacAlister, On Antipyretics
- 1887 William Henry Broadbent, The Pulse
- 1886 Peter Wallwork Latham, Some Points in the Pathology of Rheumatism, Gout, and Diabetes
- 1885 Hermann David Weber, Hygienic and Climatic Treatment of chronic pulmonary Phthisis.
- 1884 John Hughlings Jackson, Evolution and Dissolution of the Nervous System
- 1883 James Edward Pollock, Modern Theories and Treatment of Phthisis
- 1882 Joseph Fayrer, The Climate and Fevers of India
- 1881 Walter Moxon, The Influence of the Circulation upon the Nervous System
- 1880 William Cayley, On Some Points in the Pathology and Treatment of Typhoid Fever
- 1879 William H Stone, On some Applications of Physics to Medicine
- 1878 Frederick William Pavy, A New Departure in Diabetes
- 1877 J. Braxton Hicks, On the Difference between the Sexes in Regard to the Aspect and Treatment of Disease
- 1876 William Howship Dickinson, The Pathology and Relations of Albuminuria
- 1875 Edward Headlam Greenhow, On Addison's Disease
- 1874 Charles Murchison, Functional Derangements of the Liver
- 1873 Charles Bland Radcliffe, Mind, Brain, and Spinal Cord, in Certain Morbid Conditions
- 1872 John Syer Bristowe, On Disease and its Medical Treatment
- 1871 Edmund Alexander Parkes, Some Points connected with the Elimination of Nitrogen from the Human Body
- 1870 Francis Sibson, Aneurisms of the Aorta
- 1869 John William Ogle
- 1868 Henry Bence Jones, On Matter and Force
- 1867 Andrew Clark on Chronic Pulmonary Phthisis
- 1866 Edward Henry Sieveking, Localisation of Disease
- 1865 Thomas B. Peacock, Some of the Causes and Effects of Valvular Disease of the Heart
- 1864 William Richard Basham, Dropsy: its Significance as a Symptom in Renal, Cardiac and Hepatic Disease
- 1863 James Risdon Bennett, On some Points connected with Bronchitis and its Results
- 1862 Robert Lee
- 1861
- 1860 William Augustus Guy, The Numerical Method and its Application to the Science and Art of Medicine
- 1859 William Brinton, On Intestinal Obstruction
- 1858 Alexander John Sutherland, On the Pathology, Morbid Anatomy, and Treatment of Insanity
- 1857
- 1856 G. Owen Rees, On Calculous Disease and its Consequences
- 1855 Patrick Black
- 1854 Charles West, Pathological Importance of Ulceration of the Os Uteri
- 1853 Thomas Mayo, Medical Testimony and Evidence in Cases of Lunacy
- 1852 Marshall Hall, On Apoplexy and Epilepsy
- 1850 Marshall Hall, The Diastaltic Nervous System
- 1849 John Conolly, Some of the Forms of Insanity
- 1848
- 1847 George Budd
- 1844–1846 James Copland
- 1843 Robert Bentley Todd, Practical Remarks on Gout, Rheumatic Fever and Chronic Rheumatism of the Joints
- 1842
- 1841 Benjamin Guy Babington
- 1838–39 John Clendinning on the Heart
- 1835–36 George Burrows
- 1833 George Leith Roupell, On Cholera
- 1832 George Leith Roupell, General Pathology
- 1831 Edward James Seymour, On the Medical Treatment of Insanity
- 1828–1829 Francis Hawkins
- 1827 Grant David Yeats, On the Colon
- 1822–1823 Thomas Young
- 1819–1821 John Cooke, On the Nature and Uses of the Nervous System : in Treatise of Nervous Diseases
- 1817–1818 George William Carrey
- 1814–1816 William Lambe
- 1812–1813 James Haworth
- 1802–1804 Edward Roberts

=== 18th century ===
- 1799–1801 John Hunter
- 1796–1798 Matthew Baillie
- 1795 John Latham
- 1793 John Ash
- 1791 James Robertson Barclay
- 1788–1790 Francis Riollay
- 1787 George Fordyce
- 1784-1786 Thomas Heald
- 1781 Francis Milman An Inquiry into the Source from whence the Symptoms of the Scurvy and of Putrid Fevers arise
- 1774–1775 Donald Monro
- 1770 Thomas Heald
- 1763 Richard Brocklesby
- 1760 William Heberden
- 1758–1759 Thomas Lawrence
- 1756 Mark Akenside
- 1749–1755 Thomas Lawrence, De natura musculorum
