= John Arnott (disambiguation) =

Sir John Arnott, 1st Baronet (1814–1898), was an Irish entrepreneur.

John Arnott may also refer to:

- John Arnott (English footballer) (1932–2017), English footballer
- John Arnott (Scottish footballer), Scottish footballer
- John Arnott (politician) (1871–1942), Scottish politician
- Sir John Arnott, 2nd Baronet (1853–1940) of the Arnott baronets
- Sir John Arnott, 5th Baronet (1927–1981) of the Arnott baronets

== See also ==
- John Arnot (disambiguation)
- Arnott (disambiguation)
