= John Arnot =

John Arnot may refer to:

- John Arnot Jr. (1831–1886), American politician
- John Arnot, prisoner on the St. Michael of Scarborough
- Sir John Arnot (1530–1616) of Berswick, twice Lord Provost of Edinburgh
- Sir John Arnot, 3rd Baronet (died 1750) of the Arnot baronets
- Sir John Arnot, 4th Baronet (died c. 1762) of the Arnot baronets
- Sir John Arnot, 5th Baronet (died c. 1765) of the Arnot baronets

== See also ==
- John Arnott (disambiguation)
- Arnot (disambiguation)
