= Arnot (surname) =

Arnot is a surname of Scottish origin. Notable people with the surname include:

- Hugo Arnot of Balcormo (1749–1786), Scottish advocate, writer and campaigner
- Frederick Stanley Arnot (1858–1914), Scottish missionary to Africa
- Lizzie Arnot (born 1996), Scottish footballer
- Madeleine Arnot (born 1950), sociologist
- Blair Arnot, skateboarder
- David Arnot (disambiguation), multiple people
- John Arnot Jr. (1831–1886), US politician
- Robert Page Arnot (1890–1986), British Communist politician

== See also ==
- Arnott (disambiguation)
- Arnup, a surname
