= David Arnot =

David Arnot may refer to:

- David Arnot (bishop), 16th century Scottish bishop
- David Arnot (Canadian politician) (born 1952), Canadian senator
- David Arnot (minister) (1803–1877), Scottish minister
- Sir David Arnot, 2nd Baronet (died 1711) of the Arnot baronets, represented Parliament of Scotland constituency Kinross-shire
- David Arnot, see Nooitgedacht Glacial Pavements

== See also ==
- David Arnott (disambiguation)
