= David Arnott (disambiguation) =

David Arnott (born 1963) is an American actor, screenwriter and composer.

David Arnott may also refer to:

- David Arnott, played the role of Chris Cross in the 1992 film, CrissCross
- David Arnott (minister) (born 1945), Moderator of the General Assembly of the Church of Scotland
- David Arnott (marine engineer), winner of the David W. Taylor Medal
- David Arnott (politician) (1899–1960), Australian politician
- David Whitehorn Arnott (1915–2004), British scholar of African languages
- David Arnott (rugby union), Irish rugby union player

== See also ==
- Arnott (disambiguation)
- David Arnot (disambiguation)
