= Arnot =

Arnot may refer to:

- Arnot (surname)
- Arnót, a Hungarian village
- Arnot Mall, a shopping mall in New York
- Arnot Hill Park, a park in Arnold, Nottinghamshire
- The Arnot baronets
- Arnot Tower, a castle in Perth and Kinross
- Arnot Power Station, South African Power Station

== See also ==
- Arnott (disambiguation)
