= Roupell =

Roupell is a surname. Notable people with the surname include:

- Arabella Elizabeth Roupell (1817–1914), English flower painter
- George Roupell, VC (1892–1974), British army officer
- George Leith Roupell (1797–1854), English physician
- William Roupell (1831–1909), English politician, forger and fraudster
