= Edmund Ivens Spriggs =

British physician (1871–1949)

Sir Edmund Ivens Spriggs
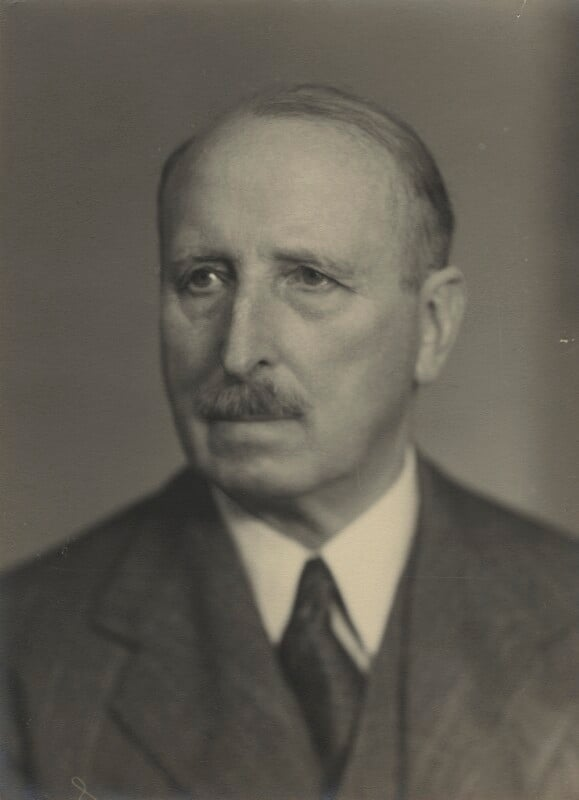
- Spriggs in 1943
- Born: 25 September 1871; Foxton, Leicestershire
- Died: 5 February 1949 (aged 77); Ruthin Castle, Denbighshire
- Occupations: Physician and medical researcher

Sir Edmund Ivens Spriggs KCVO FRCP JP (1871–1949) was a British physician and medical researcher for gastric and intestinal disorders.

After education at Market Harborough Grammar School and Wycliffe College, Gloucestershire, Edmund Spriggs was indentured at the age of eighteen to a dentist in Rotherham. By means of scholarships, he studied at Firth College and then in 1892 began medical study at Guy's Hospital Medical School. There he graduated MB in 1896 and MD in 1898 and held junior appointments until 1901. He qualified MRCP in 1899.

As a Gull Research Student, he worked in 1901 at Albrecht Kossel's laboratory in Heidelberg. Spriggs was appointed assistant physician in 1902 to the Royal Hospital for Diseases of the Chest, in 1903 to the Victoria Hospital for Children, and in 1904 to the St George's Hospital, where he was also lecturer in pharmacology. He was elected FRCP in 1905 and became dean of the St George's Hospital Medical School.

In 1911, Spriggs developed pleurisy and in 1911, suffered a relapse, which lasted for 15 months. After a year of recovery at Nordrach-on-Dee Sanatorium, he accepted the offer of Dr. David Lawson to become a senior physician at a new clinic for gastric disorders. The clinic was at Duff House, Banff, for ten years before being moved to Ruthin Castle, North Wales. At Duff House, Spriggs published seventeen papers, including one on examination of the stomach with X-rays. From 1917 to 1918, he was a medical adviser to the Ministry of Food. He worked at the Ruthin Castle clinic until 1944 when he retired.

In 1923, with D. V. Pickering and A. J. Leigh Spriggs recorded one of the earliest cases, if not the earliest in this country, of severe diabetes treated with insulin. A few years later (with J. H. Anderson), he was able to describe the recovery of the first two cases of pernicious anaemia treated in this country with the Minot-Murphy liver diet.

Spriggs was in 1906, the Oliver-Sharpey Lecturer, in 1935, the Croonian Lecturer, and in 1944, the Harveian Orator. He was appointed KCVO in 1935. He served as High Sheriff of Denbighshire in 1945. He was a J.P. in Banffshire in 1919 and in Denbighshire in 1929.

On 31 August 1905, in Foxton, he married Alice Mary Watson (b. 1879). They had two daughters, Josephine Mary (1906–1919) and Barbara (1908–1919), and two sons, Edmund Anthony (1918–1988) and Arthur Ivens (1919–2015). The two daughters died together from drowning in the ocean of the Banff seashore. Edmund A. Spriggs and Arthur I. Spriggs both became physicians and were elected FRCP. Edmund Ivens Spriggs married his second wife, Janet MacIntosh, in 1936. Lady Janet died in 1949 a few hours before Sir Edmund died.

== Selected publications ==
- Spriggs, E. I. (1902). "Eine neue Methode zur Bestimmung der Pepsinwirkung". Hoppe-Seyler's Zeitschrift für physiologische Chemie. 35 (6): 465–494. doi:10.1515/bchm2.1902.35.6.465.
- Spriggs, E. I. (3 April 1909). "Remarks on the treatment of gastric ulcer by immediate feeding". Br Med J. 1 (2518): 825–828. doi:10.1136/bmj.1.2518.825. PMC 2318510. PMID 20764384.
- "A Case of Acromegaly". Proc R Soc Med. 3(Clin Sect): 149–150. 1910. PMC 1961459. PMID 19974112.
- Spriggs, E. I. (17 June 1916). "The fasting treatment of diabetes". Br Med J. 1 (2894): 841–845. doi:10.1136/bmj.1.2894.841. PMC 2347891. PMID 20768170.
- Spriggs, E. I. (9 May 1918). "Invalid Rations". Br Med J. 1 (299): 505–507. doi:10.1136/bmj.1.2992.505. PMC 2340495. PMID 20769024.
- with O. A. Marxer: Spriggs, E. I.; Marxer, O. A. (1919). "The Examination of the Vermiform Appendix by X Rays". Archives of Radiology and Electrotherapy. 23 (10): 301–321. doi:10.1259/are.1919.0069 (inactive 12 July 2025).
- Spriggs, E. I. (24 April 1920). "An Address On Surprises in Diagnosis Delivered to the Royal Medico-Chirurgical Society of Glasgow". Br Med J. 1 (3095): 563–567. doi:10.1136/bmj.1.3095.563. PMC 2337394. PMID 20769870.
- with D. V. Pickering and A. J. Leigh: Spriggs, E. I.; Pickering, D. V.; Leigh, A. J. (14 July 1923). "Report on a case of diabetes treated with insulin". Br Med J. 2 (3263): 58–60. doi:10.1136/bmj.2.3263.58. PMC 2316915. PMID 20771226.
- with O. A. Marxer: Spriggs, E. I.; Marxer, O. A. (23 January 1926). "An Address on Intestinal Diverticula". Br Med J. 1 (3395): 130–134. doi:10.1136/bmj.1.3395.130. PMC 2522801. PMID 20772326.
- Spriggs, E. I. (28 September 1929). "Diverticulitis". Br Med J. 2 (3586): 569–574. doi:10.1136/bmj.2.3586.569. PMC 2452267. PMID 20774948.
