= Alexander Stuart (scientist) =

British natural philosopher and physician

Alexander Stuart FRS FRCP (1673 - 15 September 1742) was a British natural philosopher and physician.

== Personal life ==
Born in Aberdeen, Scotland Stuart graduated from Marischal College, University of Aberdeen, in 1691 with an MA and became a ship's surgeon, serving on the London from 1701 to 1704 and on the Europe from 1704 to 1707. While at sea he kept records of his operations and sent specimens of new creatures to Hans Sloane, with several reports on such animals being published in the Philosophical Transactions of the Royal Society.

== Education and career ==
After returning to land in 1708 he started a medical degree at Leiden University, and he graduated on 22 June 1711. He served as a doctor for the British Army for a short time but returned to England where he was elected a Fellow of the Royal Society on 30 November 1714. In 1719 he became a doctor at Westminster Hospital before transferring to St George's Hospital in 1733. He became a physician to the queen and was elected a Fellow of the Royal College of Physicians. He retired in 1736.

In 1738 he gave the first Croonian Lecture of the Royal Society, and in 1740 he was awarded the Copley Medal by the same institution. He delivered the Croonian Lecture again in 1740.
