= Eric Benjamin Strauss =

British psychiatrist (1894–1961)

- Born: 1894
- Died: 1961 (aged 66–67)
- Education: University of Oxford
- Scientific career
- Fields: Psychiatry, hypnosis

Eric Benjamin Strauss (1894–1961) was a British psychiatrist.

== Career ==
Strauss initially studied languages at the University of Oxford. He then undertook training in medicine at King's College Hospital where he became interested in hypnosis. He then trained in Psychological medicine with Ernst Kretschmer at Marburg University. On his return he worked at the Cassel Hospital in Richmond upon Thames which specialised in the treatment of people with various psychological problems. He was also attached to the Tavistock Clinic. He eventually was appointed Physician in Psychological Medicine at St. Bartholomew's Hospital, London where he worked until he retired in 1960.

== Work ==
Strauss promoted various forms of psychotherapy and other treatments for psychological problems. He published on psychological factors in asthma in Guy's Hospital Reports and on the theme of multiple aetiology which was the topic of his Croonian lectures. He was also in correspondence with Carl Jung who emphasised with regard to speakers at his society: I cannot and shall not exclude non-Aryan speakers.

== Publications ==
- Strauss, E.B. (1953). Reason and Unreason in Psychological Medicine.

== Honours ==
- President, British Psychological Society, 1959–60
- President, Section of Psychiatry, Royal Society of Medicine
