= Leonard Charles Wooldridge =

English physician and physiologist (1857–1889)

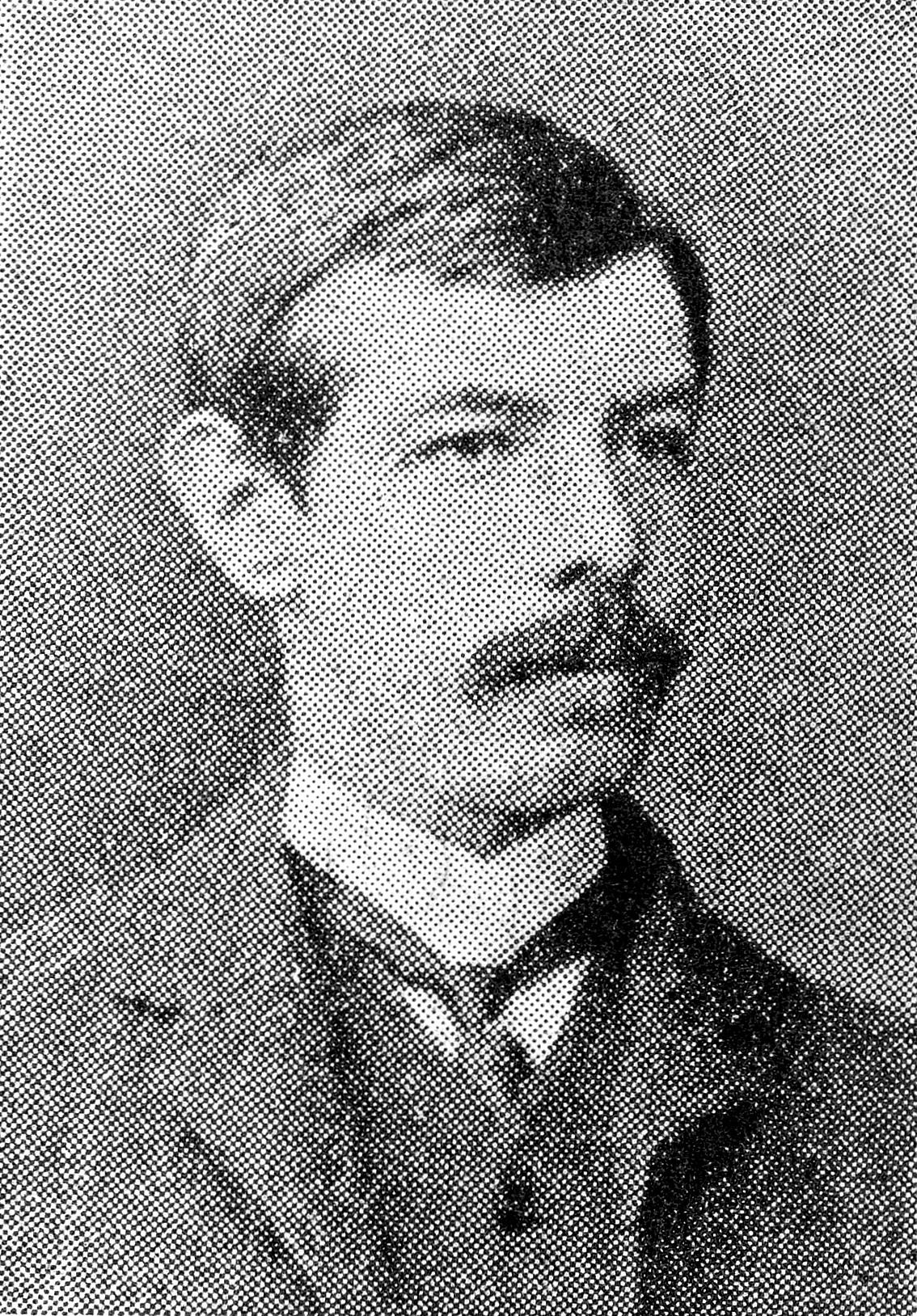
- Leonard Charles Wooldridge at the Wellcome Collection
- Born: December, 1857; Overton, Hampshire
- Died: June 6, 1889 (31)
- Years active: 1879-1889
- Board member of: Local Government Board
- Spouse: Florence Amelia Sieveking
- Children: Dorothy
- Parent: Charles Wooldridge
- Relatives: Sir Edward Henry Sieveking (father in law)
- Awards: Croonian Lecture(1886)

Academic background
- Education: Cranleigh School
- Alma mater: Guy's Hospital

Academic work
- Discipline: Medicine
- Institutions: Guy's Hospital
- Main interests: Blood coagulation

Leonard Charles Wooldridge (December 1857 – 6 June 1889) was an English physician and physiologist. He is known for his contributions to the study of blood coagulation. His pioneering work on tissue fibrinogens provided new insights into thrombosis, cirrhosis, and immunity, influencing the field of experimental medicine.

== Early life and education ==
Wooldridge was born in 1857 in Overton, Hampshire, where his father, Charles Wooldridge, had a large medical practice. He attended the Surrey County School, now known as Cranleigh School, in Cranleigh. After the death of his father, he moved to London alone in 1874 and enrolled at the university, attending preparatory classes at Guy’s Hospital. In 1875, he was admitted to the hospital as a full-time student.

During his studies, he demonstrated exceptional academic ability, earning multiple distinctions and prizes in examinations for degrees including MB BSc DSc and MD.

== Academic and professional career ==
In 1879, he travelled to Germany, where he worked in the laboratory of Carl Ludwig in Leipzig until 1882. In 1883, he went to study pathology under Rudolf Virchow in Berlin.

In 1884, Wooldridge returned to England and took up a position as a demonstrator in histology and physiology at Guy's Hospital in London. That same year, he was awarded the Research Scholarship of the Grocers’ Company in London, which was renewed for an additional three years in 1887.

In 1887, he joined the staff of Guy's Hospital as an Assistant Physician and Joint Lecturer in Physiology. That same year, he was also appointed as a collaborator with the Local Government Board, a public health authority.

=== Research and scientific contributions ===
Wooldridge was known for his meticulous research and experimental approach. His work on the chemical composition of blood cells led him to observe coagulation phenomena that could not be easily explained by existing scientific theories. His research resulted in a significant reevaluation of blood coagulation processes.

He was particularly recognised for discovering that proteins extracted from various organs, when introduced into circulating blood, immediately induced coagulation. He termed these substances tissue fibrinogens. Wooldridge used these substances to induce thrombosis in the liver, an achievement that had previously eluded pathologists. If the experimental animal survived, it developed cirrhotic changes in the liver, providing valuable insights into the etiology of cirrhosis.

His research also had practical implications in immunology. He found that fibrinogen solutions used as culture mediums for Bacillus anthracis (anthrax) could confer immunity to animals against the disease. More significantly, he observed that immunity could be achieved even without bacterial mediation by making slight chemical modifications to the fibrinogens. This discovery suggested a novel approach to vaccine development and disease prevention.

Wooldridge's findings were particularly significant because the substances he studied were not foreign to the body but were likely a natural component of lymph. Under normal conditions, they entered the bloodstream in small amounts and did not exhibit harmful effects. However, he demonstrated that circulatory disturbances could increase their concentration, altering blood properties and leading to edema or hemorrhage.

=== Awards ===
In 1885, he was elected as a member of the Royal College of Physicians.

In 1881, Wooldridge was awarded the George Henry Lewes travel scholarship by Professor Michael Foster, which enabled him to study pathology under Rudolf Virchow in Berlin during the winter of 1883.

Wooldridge delivered the Croonian Lecture on The Coagulation of the Blood in 1886.

=== Work ethic and health ===
Wooldridge was deeply committed to his work, often pushing himself beyond physical limits. He had an exceptional ability to acquire knowledge quickly and analyse complex problems with clarity. His dedication to research led him to spend long hours in the hospital and laboratory, frequently foregoing rest and proper meals.

Although he had a strong constitution, his relentless work habits took a toll on his health. He occasionally experienced periods of exhaustion, which were noticeable to those around him. Despite these challenges, he remained focused on his scientific pursuits and career aspirations.

== Death ==
In the spring of 1889, during a period of extreme overwork, Wooldridge fell ill after eating a late lunch at Guy's Hospital, which he suspected contained spoiled fish. He contracted an intestinal infection, experiencing diarrhoea and vomiting for several hours and remained unwell in the following days. Despite attempting to recover with a day's train journey to Hastings, his condition deteriorated, and he died a week later.

== Legacy ==
Wooldridge's contributions to the understanding of blood coagulation, thrombosis, and immunology left a lasting impact on the medical community. His ability to integrate and reinterpret scientific findings set him apart as a pioneer in his field. His work inspired further research into the biochemical mechanisms of coagulation and disease immunity.
