= William Brinton =

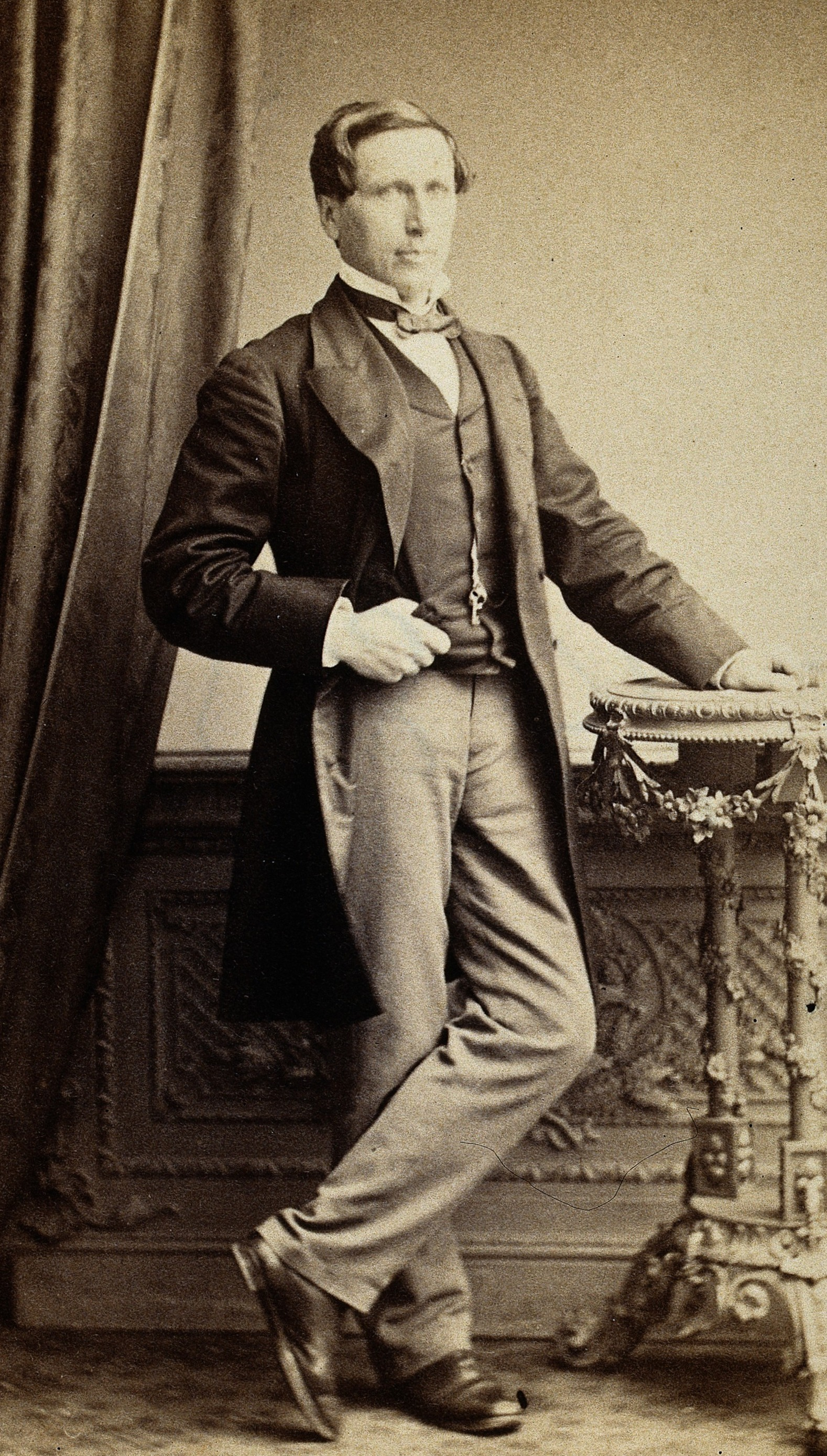
William Brinton in 1862

William Brinton (20 November 1823 – 17 January 1867) was an English physician.

== Life ==
He was born at Kidderminster, where his father was a carpet manufacturer. After education at private schools and as apprentice to a Kidderminster surgeon he matriculated at London University in 1843, and began medical studies at King's College, London. He won several prizes, and graduated M.B. from London University in 1847, M.D. in 1848. In 1849 he became a member of the College of Physicians, and in 1854 a fellow.

After holding some minor appointments at his own medical school he was elected lecturer on forensic medicine at St. Thomas's Hospital. He early acquired a considerable practic, became physician to St. Thomas's Hospital, and in addition to his other lectureship was made lecturer on physiology there. He married in 1854 Mary Danvers, daughter of Frederick Danvers of London, and lived in Brook Street, Grosvenor Square, and his practice steadily increased. Intestinal obstruction and diseases of the alimentary canal in general were subjects to which he had paid special attention, and on which he was often consulted. His Croonian lectures at the College of Physicians in 1859 were on intestinal obstruction. He was elected Fellow of the Royal Society in 1864.

His vacations were often spent in the Tyrol, where he was an active member of the Alpine Club. Two papers by him appear in 'Peaks, Passes, and Glaciers' (series ii. vol. i.). In 1863 Brinton showed symptoms of renal disease, and he died on 17 January 1867.

He left six children, and one of his sons graduated in medicine at Cambridge.

== Works ==
In 1848 he sent to the Royal Society a paper, 'Contributions to the Physiology of the Alimentary Canal.' He published a series of 'clinical remarks' in The Lancet. In 1857 he published the Pathology, Symptoms, and Treatment of Ulcer of the Stomach, the first complete treatise on that subject which had appeared in England, and in 1859 he brought out 'Lectures on the Diseases of the Stomach,' of which a second edition was published in 1864. This book contains an account of the existing knowledge of the subject, with many notes of cases and a few observations new to medicine, for example the description (p. 87, ed. 1864) of the condition of stomach sometimes discovered after death in cases of scarlet fever. In the last chapter Brinton demonstrates the absence of pathological ground for the affection often named "gout in the stomach".

Brinton published many papers in the medical periodicals of his time. He translated Gabriel Valentin's 'Text Book of Physiology' from the German in 1853; wrote a short treatise 'On the Medical Selection of Lives for Assurance' in 1856, and in 1861 'On Food and its Digestion, being an Introduction to Dietetics,' besides six articles in Robert Bentley Todd's Cyclopædia of Anatomy and Physiology, and some papers read before the Royal Society.

After his death a treatise on 'Intestinal Obstruction,' based on his Croonian lectures, was edited by his friend Dr. Buzzard. In all his books assertions rest on a basis of observation. A memoir of Brinton by Dr. Thomas Buzzard appeared in the Lancet for 26 January 1867, and was reprinted.
