= Soulden Lawrence =

British judge

Sir Soulden Lawrence (1751–1814), judge, son of Thomas Lawrence, M.D., president of the College of Physicians, by Frances, daughter of Charles Chauncy, M.D., of Derby, was born in 1751, and educated at St. Paul's School and St. John's College, Cambridge, where he graduated B.A. in 1771 as seventh wrangler, and proceeded M.A. and was elected fellow in 1774. At college he was a contemporary of Edward Law, afterwards Lord Ellenborough.

He was called to the bar at the Inner Temple in June 1784, and to the degree of serjeant-at-law on 9 February 1787, and in March 1794 succeeded Sir Henry Gould the younger [q. v.] as justice of the common pleas, being at the same time knighted. In the following June he was transferred to the court of King's bench on the resignation of Sir Francis Buller [q. v.] He was a member of the special commission that tried Thomas Hardy, Horne Tooke, and other partisans of the French republic for high treason in 1794–6, and concurred with Lord Kenyon in dismissing the prosecution for libel brought by Tooke after his acquittal against the printer and publisher of a report of the House of Commons, which reflected on him and his colleagues as disaffected to the government.

Lawrence was a judge of great ability and independence of mind, and sometimes differed from Lord Kenyon, notably in the case of Haycraft v. Creasy in 1801, an action for damages for false representation made in good faith, when Kenyon gave judgment for the plaintiff. Kenyon's vexation at being overruled — for the other members of the court agreed with Lawrence — is supposed to have hastened his death. Lawrence's extreme scrupulousness is evinced by the fact that his will contained a direction for the indemnification out of his estate of the losing party in a suit in which he considered that he had misdirected the jury.

In consequence of a difference with Lord Ellenborough, he resigned his seat on the king's bench in March 1808, and returned to the common pleas, succeeding to the place vacant by the death of Sir Giles Rooke. His health failing, he retired in Easter term 1812, and was succeeded by Sir Vicary Gibbs He died unmarried on 8 July 1814, and was buried in the church of St. Giles-in-the-Fields, where there is a monument to him. He was something of a connoisseur in art, and had a small collection of pictures, including works by Spagnoletto, Franz Hals, Sir Joshua Reynolds, Opie, Morland, and other celebrated artists, which was sold after his death.
