= Arnup =

Arnup is a surname. Notable people with the surname include:

- Sally Arnup (1930–2015), English sculptor
- John Arnup (1911–2005), Canadian judge

- Arnup Cup, award in Canadian law student contest

== See also ==
- Arnot (surname)
