= Fayrer baronets =

Extinct baronetcy in the Baronetage of the United Kingdom

- Escutcheon of the Fayrer baronets of Devonshire Street
- Creation date: 1896
- Status: extinct
- Extinction date: 2017
- Motto: Ne Tentes Aut Perfice (All or nothing)
- Arms: Argent on a bend inverted Sable between in chief an Eastern crown Gules and in base the staff of Æsculapius Proper enfiled with a like crown three horse-shoes Or
- Crest: In front of a sword erect Proper pommel and hilt Gold a horse-shoe Or between two wings Gules.

The Fayrer baronetcy, of Devonshire Street in St Marylebone in the County of London, was a title in the Baronetage of the United Kingdom. It was created on 11 February 1896 for the physician Joseph Fayrer. The baronetcy became extinct on the death of the 4th Baronet in 2017. The family surname was pronounced "Fairer".

== Fayrer baronets, of Devonshire Street (1896) ==
- Sir Joseph Fayrer, 1st Baronet (1824–1907)
- Sir Joseph Fayrer, 2nd Baronet (1859–1937)
- Sir Joseph Herbert Spens Fayrer, 3rd Baronet (1899–1976)
- Sir John Lang Macpherson Fayrer, 4th Baronet (18 October 1944 – 9 March 2017)

The baronetcy became extinct on the death of the 4th Baronet.

== Notes ==
Baronetage of the United Kingdom
Preceded by Forwood baronets	Fayrer baronets of Devonshire Street; 11 February 1896	Succeeded by Arnott baronets
