= John Cooke (physician) =

English physician

John Cooke (1756–1838) was an English physician.

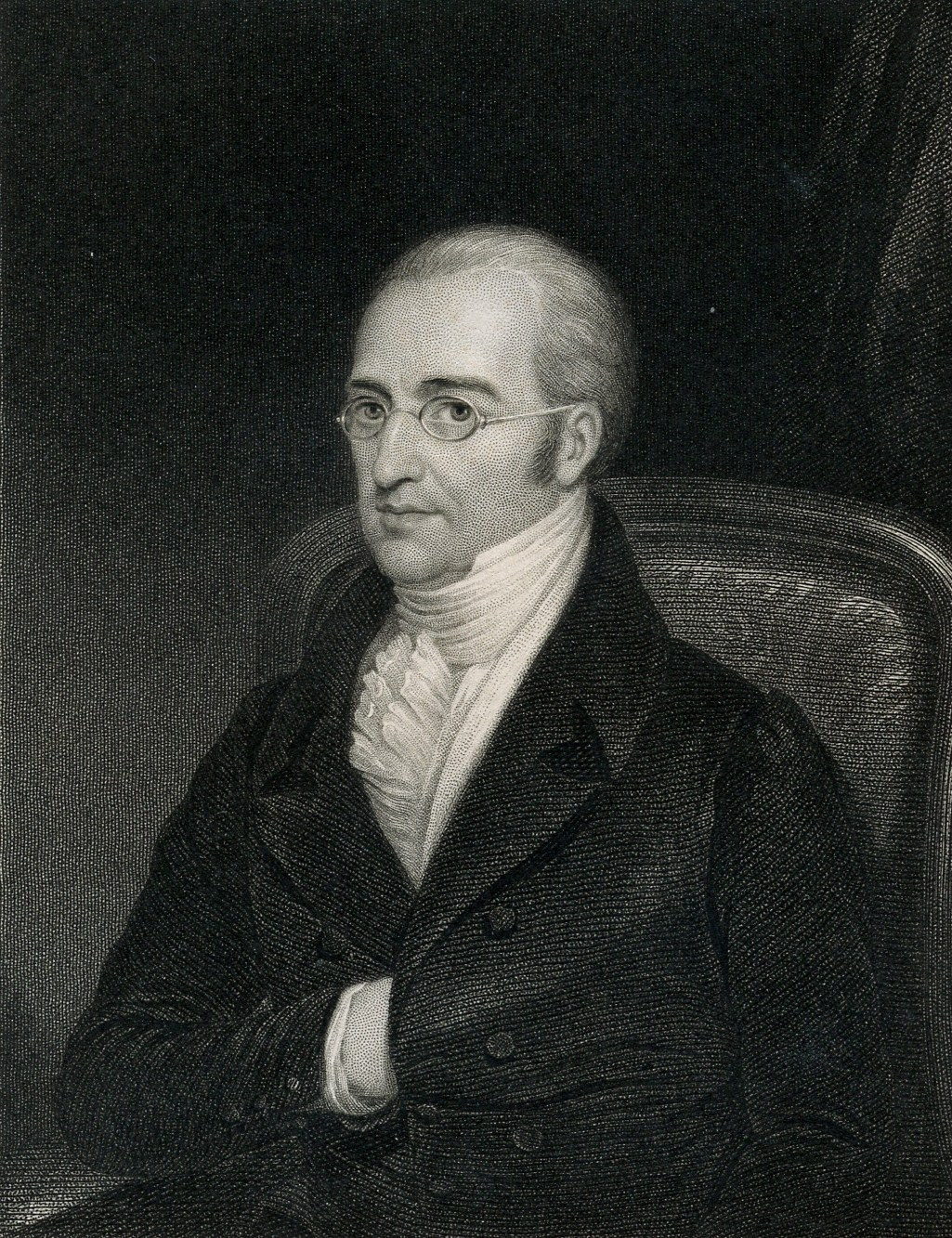
John Cooke

== Life ==
Cooke was born in Lancashire, and was educated by Philip Doddridge to be a dissenting minister. He preached at Rochdale and at Preston. He then became a medical student at Guy's Hospital in London, going on to the University of Edinburgh and University of Leyden, where he graduated.

Cooke became physician to the Royal General Dispensary in Bartholomew Close, in the City of London. In April 1784 he was elected physician to the London Hospital, a post he held for 23 years, and delivered the first clinical lectures given there. On 25 June in the same year he was admitted a licentiate of the Royal College of Physicians. In 1807 he was elected a fellow of the College of Physicians, and ten years later a Fellow of the Royal Society. He delivered the Croonian lectures at the College of Physicians in 1819, 1820, and 1821, and the Harveian oration in 1828.

Cooke was president of the Medical and Chirurgical Society of London in 1822 and 1823. He was also a Fellow of the Society of Antiquaries of London. In his latter years he gave up practice and went out little. He died at his house in Gower Street, London, 1 January 1838.

== Works ==
Cooke's thesis was on the use of Peruvian bark, in cases where there is no rise of temperature. In 1820 he began the publication of A Treatise on Nervous Diseases, completed in 1823. An American edition, in one volume, was published at Boston in 1824. This work is based on his Croonian lectures. It gives an account of the existing knowledge of hemiplegia, paraplegia, paralysis of separate nerves, epilepsy, apoplexy, lethargy, and hydrocephalus internus, without major innovations. The method is comparable to that of his friend Thomas Young in his Practical and Historical Treatise on Consumptive Diseases (1815).

== Notes ==
Attribution

This article incorporates text from a publication now in the public domain: Stephen, Leslie, ed. (1887). "Cooke, John (1756-1838)". Dictionary of National Biography. Vol. 12. London: Smith, Elder & Co.
