= William Croone =

English physician

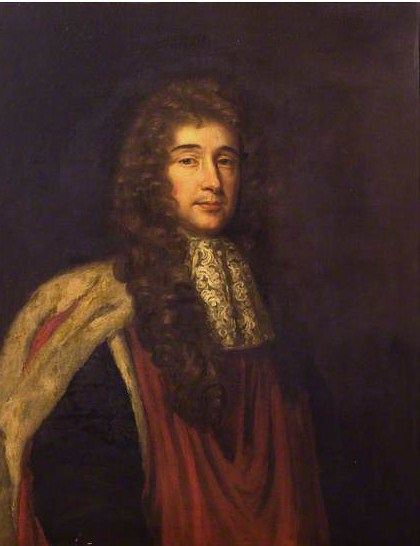
Portrait of William Croone, painted by Mary Beale in 1680

William Croone (15 September 1633 – 12 October 1684) was an English physician and one of the original Fellows of the Royal Society.

== Life ==
He was born in London on 15 September 1633, and admitted to Merchant Taylors' School on 11 December 1642. He was admitted on 13 May 1647 a pensioner of Emmanuel College, Cambridge, graduating B.A. in 1651, and M.A. in 1654. After taking his first degree in arts, he was elected to a fellowship.

In 1659 he was chosen Gresham Professor of Rhetoric in London, and while holding that office he promoted the institution of the Royal Society, the members of which assembled there. At their first meeting after they had formed themselves into a regular body, on 28 November 1660, he was appointed their registrar, and he continued in that office till the grant of their charter, by which John Wilkins and Henry Oldenburg were nominated joint secretaries. On 7 October 1662 he was created doctor of medicine at Cambridge by royal mandate. He was chosen one of the first fellows of the Royal Society on 20 May 1663, after the grant of their charter, and he frequently sat upon the council. On 25 June the same year he was admitted a candidate of the College of Physicians. In 1665 he visited France, where he became acquainted with several learned and eminent men.

The Company of Surgeons appointed him, on 28 August 1670, their anatomy lecturer on the muscles, in succession to Sir Charles Scarborough, and he held that office till his death. Soon after his appointment to it he resigned his professorship at Gresham College. On 29 July 1675, after having waited twelve years for a vacancy, he was admitted a fellow of the College of Physicians. He acquired an extensive and lucrative practice in the latter part of his life. He died on 12 October 1684, and was buried in St Mildred, Poultry. His funeral sermon was preached by John Scott, D.D., canon of Windsor, and published.

== Works ==
He published 'De ratione motus Musculorum,' London, 1664, and Amsterdam, 1667; and read papers to the Royal Society, including 'A Discourse on the Conformation of a Chick in the Egg before Incubation' (28 March 1671). Dr. Goodall states that Croone 'had made most ingenious and excellent observations de ovo, long before Malpighius's book upon that subject was extant.'

== Legacy ==
He was the founder of the Croonian Lectures. Croone left behind him a plan for two lectureships: one lecture was to be read before the College of Physicians, with a sermon to be preached at the church of St Mary-le-Bow in London, the other to be delivered yearly before the Royal Society upon the nature and laws of muscular motion. But as his will contained no provision for the endowment of these lectures, his widow carried out his intention by devising in her will the King's Head Tavern in Lambeth Hill, Knightrider Street, in trust to her executors to settle four parts out of five upon the College of Physicians to found the annual lecture now called the Croonian lecture; and the fifth part on the Royal Society.

His wife, Mary, remarried after he died. Lady Sadleir (as she became) also, out of regard for the memory of her first husband, William Croone, provided for the establishment of the algebra lectures which were afterwards founded at some colleges at Cambridge. These early endowed lectures starting in 1710 eventually were transformed into the Sadleirian Professorship at Cambridge University in 1860.

The date 4 June is celebrated in the natural history museum community as "Old Croone Day", marking Croone's lecture before the Royal Society on 4 June 1662, the first documented use of a preservative fluid (ethanol in this case) for long-term curation of museum specimens.

== Family ==
He married Mary, daughter of Alderman John Lorymer of London. She afterwards became the wife of Sir Edwin Sadleir, bart., of Temple Dinsley, Hertfordshire, and died on 30 September 1706.
