= Browne Langrish =

English physician and medical author

Browne Langrish M.D. (died 1759) was an English physician and medical author.

== Life ==
Born in Hampshire, Langrish was trained as a surgeon. In 1733 he was in practice at Petersfield, Hampshire. On 25 July 1734 he became an extra licentiate of the College of Physicians, and began practice as a physician. He was elected a Fellow of the Royal Society on 16 May 1734, and practised in Winchester. He graduated M.D. in 1748.

Langrish died at Basingstoke, Hampshire, on 12 November 1759, buried at Winchester Cathedral on 28 November 1769.

== Works ==
Langrish published A New Essay on Muscular Motion (1733) in which the structure of muscles and the phenomena of muscular contraction were discussed. In 1735 he published The Modern Theory and Practice of Physic, including original clinical. He described experiments in the analysis of excreta and the examination of the blood. A second edition appeared in 1764.

In 1746 Langrish published Physical Experiments on Brutes, in order to discover a safe and easy Method of dissolving Stone in the Bladder. Experiments on cherry laurel water were included, and he concluded that this poisonous liquid may be used in medicine. He delivered Croonian lectures on muscular motion before the Royal Society in 1747, and they were published in 1748. In the same year he published also Plain Directions in regard to the Small-pox.

== Notes ==
Attribution

This article incorporates text from a publication now in the public domain: Lee, Sidney, ed. (1892). "Langrish, Browne". Dictionary of National Biography. Vol. 32. London: Smith, Elder & Co.
