= Brockhoff Biscuits =

Australian biscuit manufacturer

Brockhoffs Biscuits Pty. Ltd.
- Formerly: A. F. Brockhoff & Co.
- Type: Private
- Industry: Biscuit
- Founded: 1860; 166 years ago in Braidwood, New South Wales, Australia
- Founder: Adolf F. Brockhoff
- Defunct: 1963
- Fate: Merged with Arnott's Biscuits
- Successor: Arnott's Biscuits
- Headquarters: Braidwood, Australia
- Area served: Australia

Brockhoff Biscuits Pty Ltd, formerly known as A. F. Brockhoff & Co., was an Australian manufacturer of biscuits based in Braidwood, New South Wales.

== History ==
The company was founded in 1860 by Adolf F. Brockhoff.

In 1882, A. F. Brockhoff & Co. advertised for staff for a factory in West Melbourne.

In 1963 Arnott's Biscuits and the company merged, although they continued to trade under both names for several years until the "Brockhoff" name was completely dropped in the late 1970s.

== Products ==
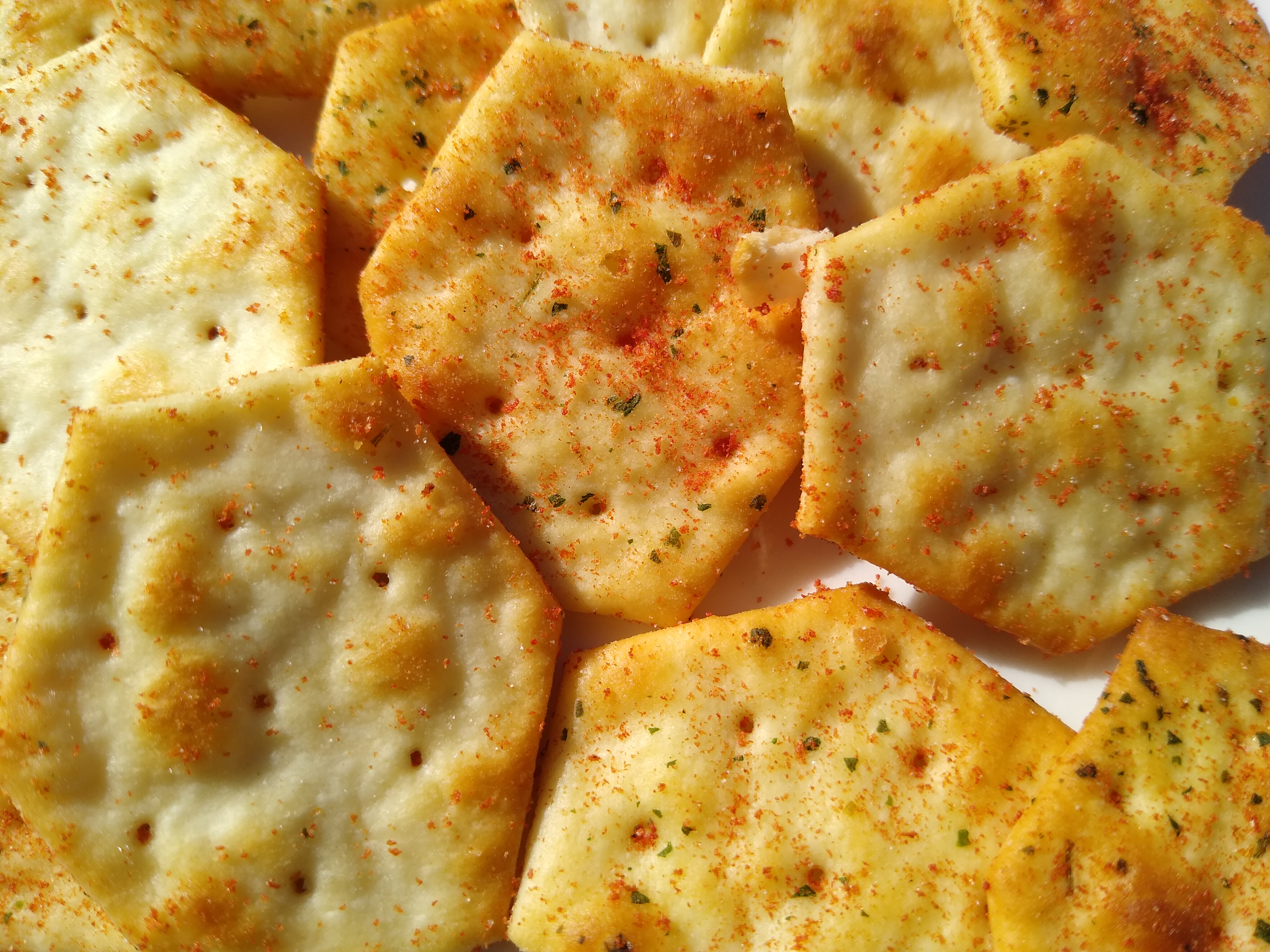
Arnott's Shapes

- Cheds
- Chocolate Cream
- Chocolate Ripple
- Chocolate Royal
- Clix
- Cresta
- Crispette
- Crispo
- Custard Cream
- Dundee Shortbread
- Edinburgh Shortbread
- Golden Cookies
- Golden Crunch
- Gran-O-Meal
- Grain-O-Malt
- Malt
- Malt-O-Milk
- Milk Choco
- Morning Coffee
- Nu-trola
- Orange Cream
- Peanut Crisp
- Raspberry Shortcake
- Salada
- Shapes
- Savoy
- Stirling
- Tartan Shortbread
- Thin Captain
- Tic-Toc
- Vanilla Cream
