= Thomas Healde =

English physician

Thomas Healde (or Heald) FRS (1724 – 26 March 1789) was an English physician.

He was born in Ashbourne, Derbyshire, the son of Robert Healde of Norwich. After attending Repton School he was admitted in 1742 as a sub-sizar at Trinity College, Cambridge, and was awarded M.B. in 1749 and M.D. in 1754.

He started up in practice at Witham, Essex, was admitted a candidate of the Royal College of Physicians (RCP) in 1759, and elected a fellow in 1760. In 1763 he delivered the Gulstonian lectures and in 1765 was the Harveian Orator. He moved to London in 1767 and was made censor of the RCP in 1769 and 1771. He was appointed physician to the London Hospital on 20 June 1770, and elected a Fellow of the Royal Society the following day. In 1771 he was appointed Gresham Professor of Physic at Gresham College, a position he held for life.

He was the RCP Croonian lecturer in 1770 and from 1784 to 1786, and delivered their Lumleian lectures from 1786 until his death.

He died in 1789, leaving his wife and family destitute. His widow worked as a midwife and the RCP voted the family £100 relief.

== Works ==
- ‘The Use of Oleum Asphalti,’ 8vo, London, 1769.
- ‘The New Pharmacopœia of the Royal College of Physicians, translated with Notes,’ 8vo, London, 1788 (another edition, 1793)
