= Occupational and Environmental Medicine =

- Discipline: Occupational and environmental medicine
- Language: English
- Edited by: Michelle Turner

Publication details
- Former name: British Journal of Industrial Medicine
- History: 1944–present
- Publisher: BMJ Group (United Kingdom)
- Frequency: Monthly
- Open access: Hybrid
- Impact factor: 3.2 (2025)

Standard abbreviations
- ISO 4: Occup. Environ. Med.

Indexing
- CODEN: OEMEEM
- ISSN: 1351-0711 (print); 1470-7926 (web)
- LCCN: 99103194
- OCLC no.: 41236398
- British Journal of Industrial Medicine
- ISSN: 0007-1072

Links
- Journal homepage; Online access; Online archive

Occupational and Environmental Medicine is a monthly peer-reviewed medical journal which covers research in occupational and environmental medicine. It is published by the BMJ Group and is the official journal of the Faculty of Occupational Medicine of the Royal College of Physicians of London.

The journal was established in 1944 under founding editor-in-chief Donald Hunter as the British Journal of Industrial Medicine and obtained its present title in 1994.

== Abstracting and indexing ==
The journal is abstracted and indexed by EMBASE, MEDLINE, Scopus, and the Science Citation Index Expanded. According to the Journal Citation Reports, the journal has a 2023 impact factor of 3.9.

== See also ==
- Occupational Health Science (journal)
