= Thomas Lawrence (physician) =

English physician and biographer

Thomas Lawrence (1711–1783) was an English physician and biographer, who became President of the Royal College of Physicians in 1767.

== Life ==
The second son of Captain Thomas Lawrence, R.N., by Elizabeth, daughter of Gabriel Soulden of Kinsale, and widow of a Colonel Piers, Lawrence was born in the parish of St. Margaret, Westminster, on 25 May 1711. He was grandson of another Dr. Thomas Lawrence (died 1714), a royal physician who was nephew of Henry Lawrence. Accompanying his father when appointed to the Irish station about 1715, he was for a time at school in Dublin. His mother died in 1724, and his father then left the navy and settled with his family at Southampton. He attended Southampton grammar school, and in October 1727 was entered Trinity College, Oxford as a commoner. He graduated B.A. in 1730, and M.A. in 1733.

Lawrence chose medicine as profession, and moved to London, where he attended the anatomical lectures of Dr. Frank Nicholls, and the practice of St. Thomas's Hospital. He graduated M.B. at Oxford, 1736, M.D. 1740, and succeeded Nicholls as anatomical reader in the university, but resided in London, where he also delivered anatomical lectures.

Admitted a candidate of the London College of Physicians in 1743, Lawrence was a fellow in 1744. After filling a number of college offices he was elected president in 1767, and was annually re-elected for seven consecutive years. After 1750, finding he had competition from William Hunter, he abandoned his lectures, and concentrated on medical practice, without great success.

About 1773 Lawrence's health began to fail, and he first perceived symptoms of angina pectoris, which continued. In 1782 he had an attack of paralysis, and in the same year moved from London to Canterbury, where he died on 6 June 1783. He was buried in St. Margaret's Church, and a tablet, with a Latin epitaph, was placed in Canterbury Cathedral.

== Works ==
Lawrence's works were all written in Latin, and were:

- Oratio Harvæana, London, 1748.
- Hydrops, disputatio medica, London, 1756, in the form of a dialogue between William Harvey, Sir George Ent, and Baldwin Hamey, based on the doctrines of Georg Ernst Stahl.
- Prælectiones medicæ duodecim de calvariæ et capitis morbis, London, 1757.
- De Natura Musculorum prælectiones tres, London, 1759.
- Life of Harvey prefixed to the college edition of his Opera Omnia, London, 1766.
- Life of Dr. Frank Nicholls, "cum conjecturis ejusdem de natura et usu partium humani corporis similarium", London, 1780, privately printed.

== Family ==
On 25 May 1744 Lawrence was married in London to Frances Chauncy (2 January 1780), daughter of Dr. Chauncy, a physician in Derby; they had six sons and three daughters. Sir Soulden Lawrence was one of the sons. Another went to the East Indies, an occasion commemorated by Samuel Johnson, a personal friend and a patient, with the Latin alcaic ode, Ad Thomam Laurence, medicum doctissimum, cum filium peregre agentem desiderio nimis tristi prosequeretur. Lawrence had met Johnson through Richard Bathurst.

== Notes ==
Attribution

This article incorporates text from a publication now in the public domain: Lee, Sidney, ed. (1892). "Lawrence, Thomas (1711-1783)". Dictionary of National Biography. Vol. 32. London: Smith, Elder & Co.
