= Joseph Fayrer =

Royal British Physician (1824–1907)

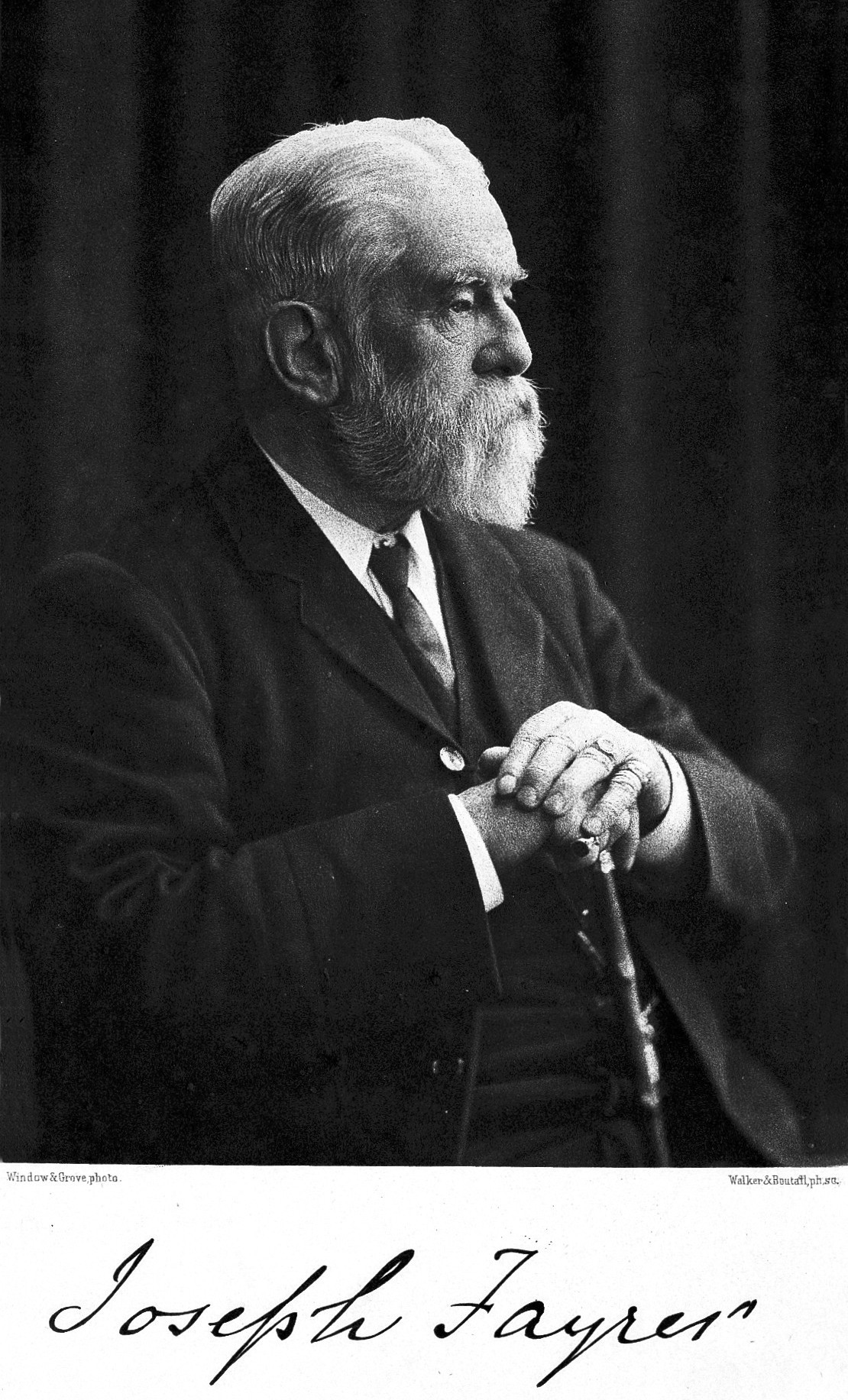
Portrait, 1900

Sir Joseph Fayrer, 1st Baronet KCSI FRS FRSE FRCS FRCP LLD (6 December 1824 – 21 May 1907) was a British physician who served as Surgeon General in India. He is noted for his writings on medicine, work on public health and his studies particularly on the treatment of snakebite, in India. He was also involved in official investigation on cholera, in which he did not accept the idea, proposed by Robert Koch, of germs as the cause of cholera.

== Early life ==
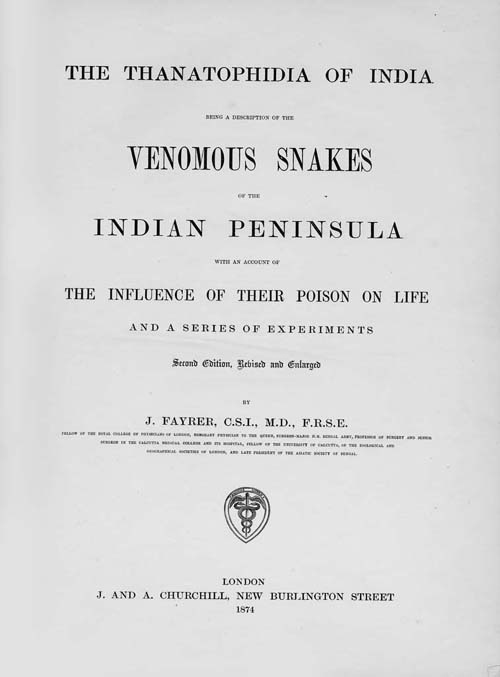
Cover of his book on venomous snakes

The second son of Robert John Fayrer (1788–1869), a Commander in the Royal Navy, and wife Agnes Wilkinson (d. 1861) he was born at Plymouth, Devon. Fayrer's father was in charge of steamships after his retirement from the navy. The family lived for a time at Haverbrack, Westmorland where Joseph became acquainted with William Wordsworth, Hartley Coleridge and John Wilson. Joseph studied some engineering in 1840 and joined as a midshipman and in 1843 he travelled with his father to Bermuda. An outbreak of yellow fever made him interested in medicine. He joined to study medicine at Charing Cross Hospital, London in 1844 and his fellow students included William Guyer Hunter and Thomas Henry Huxley. He became a house surgeon at Westminster Ophthalmic Hospital in his second year and became MRCS in 1847. He was in 1847 appointed medical officer of HMS Victory. He then resigned his commission and travelled around Europe along with Ernest Augustus Edgcumbe, 3rd Earl of Mount Edgcumbe, in the course of which he saw fighting at Palermo and Rome. He then resumed his study of medicine at Rome and received an MD in 1849.

== India ==
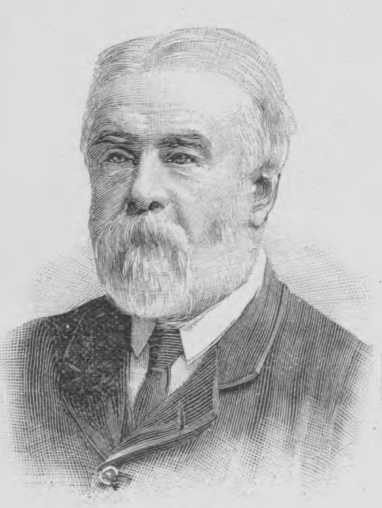

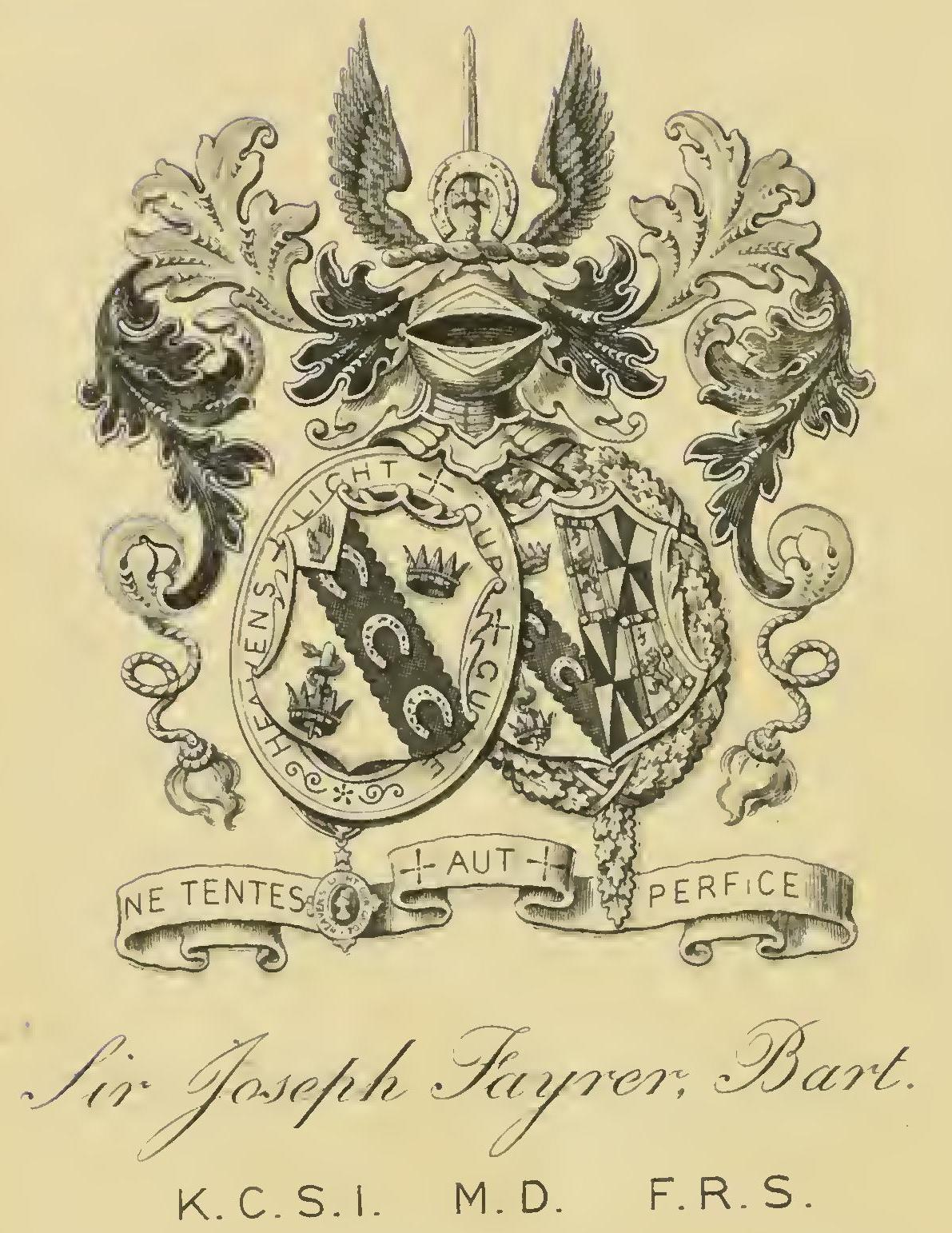
Personal bookplate of "Sir Joeseph Fayrer, Bart. K.C.S.I. M.D. F.R.S." "NE TENTES AUT PERFICE" from his copy, Proceedings of the Asiatic Society of Bengal of 1868

Appointed an assistant surgeon in the Indian Medical Service of Bengal in 1850, he was posted at Chinsura, Cherrapunji and Dacca. He saw action as a field surgeon during the Burmese campaign of 1852. For his service, Lord Dalhousie made him political assistant and Residency surgeon at Lucknow in 1853. He married Bethia Mary, daughter of Brigadier General Andrew Spens, on 4 October 1855, at Lucknow. During the Indian Mutiny, his home in Lucknow became a hospital as well as a fortress. It was at his home that Sir Henry Montgomery Lawrence died. His wife and child survived and they were relieved on 17 November 1857. He left India on furlough in 1858 and obtained an MD from the University of Edinburgh Medical School in March 1859, presenting the thesis "On amputation at the hip-joint and excision of the head of the femur". Returning to India in 1859, he became professor of surgery at the Medical College of Calcutta, and was briefly a personal surgeon to Lord Mayo in 1869 and when the Prince of Wales made his tour in India he was appointed to accompany him as physician. He was later appointed Physician Extraordinary to King Edward VII in 1901. Returning to England in 1872, he acted as president of the Medical Board of the India office from 1874 to 1895, president of the Epidemiological Society for 1879-1881 and on 7 February 1896 he was created a baronet. Fayrer held a position against the germ theory of cholera which had led to the idea of quarantine (which he considered as evil) and preferred the idea that disease was restricted to particular locations, with factors such as air, water, and weather being responsible.

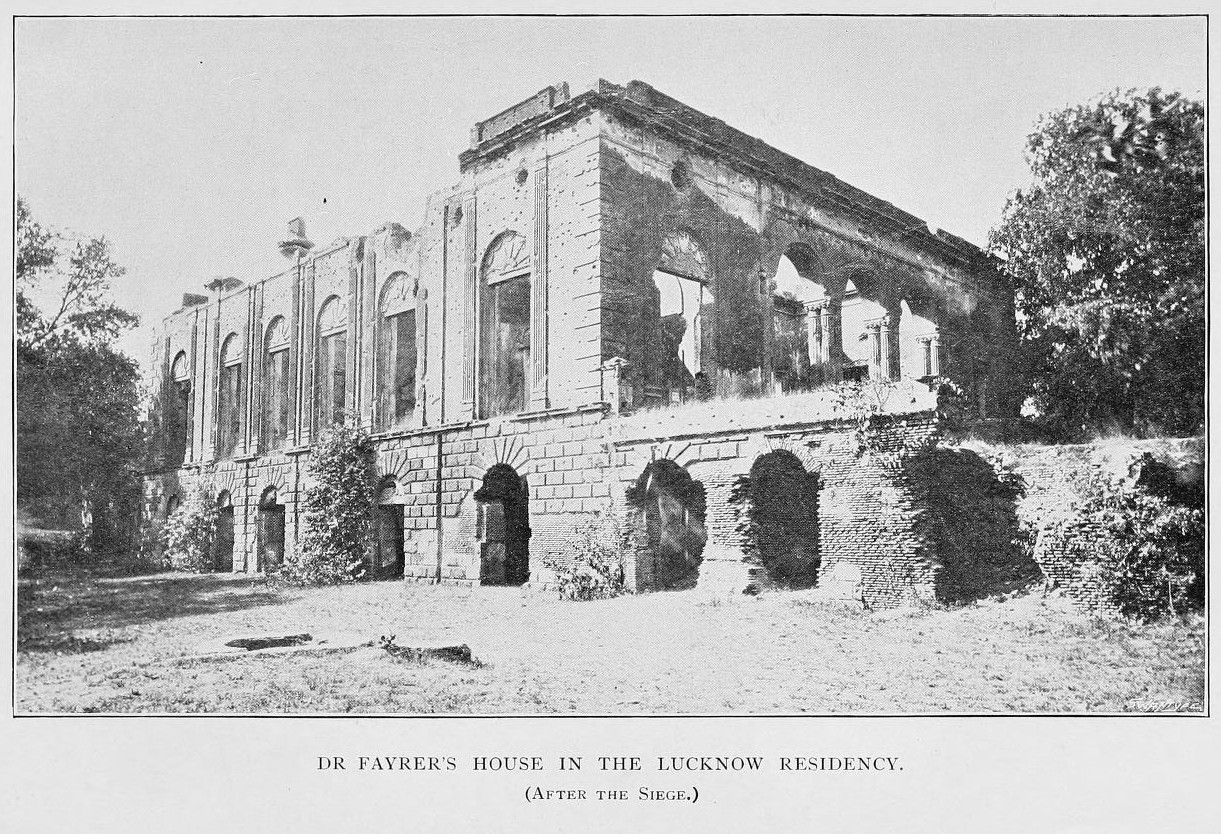
Fayrer's home in Lucknow (after 1857)

He was President of the Asiatic Society of Bengal in 1867 and proposed a scheme for a zoological garden in Calcutta. This was finally opened by the Prince of Wales in 1875. He took considerable interest in the wild animals and wrote a book on the tiger and procured living specimens of the pygmy hogs for the Zoological Society of London. He became a fellow of the Royal Society in 1877, wrote much on subjects connected with the practice of medicine in India, and was especially known for his studies on the poisonous snakes of that country and on the physiological effects produced by their venom (Thanatophidia of India, 1872). He researched snake venom along with Thomas Lauder Brunton in 1867 with assistance of Dr F. C. Webb. The book was printed by the Indian government and illustrated by artists from the Calcutta School of Art. In 1879, he spoke on The progress of epidemiology in India (published in 1880). In 1900 he published his autobiography, Recollections of my Life. Fayrer knew Persian, several Indian languages and Italian. He also took an interest in anthropology and interacted with Thomas Henry Huxley on the topic. He proposed that an Ethnological Congress be held by the Asiatic Society of Bengal in 1866. Although this exhibition was not held, the idea of an Ethnographic survey was realized a few years later by Herbert Hope Risley.

After retirement he took an interest in deep-sea fishing and yachting. He died at his home, Belfield, Wood Lane, Falmouth, Cornwall, on 21 May 1907.

== Honours and arms ==
Fayrer was appointed a Companion of the Order of the Star of India (CSI) in 1868, and promoted to Knight Commander (KCSI) in 1876. In 1876 Fayrer was incharge of the health of the Prince of Wales on his visit to India.

Sir Joseph was created a baronet of Devonshire Street in the parish of St Marylebone in the County of London on 11 February 1896.

Coat of arms of Joseph Fayrer
Crest In front of a sword erect Proper pommel and hilt Gold a horse-shoe Or between two wings Gules. Escutcheon Argent on a bend invected Sable between in chief an Eastern crown Gules and in base the staff of AEsculapius Proper enfiled with a like crown three horse-shoes Or. Motto Ne Tentes Aut Perfice

== Family ==
On 4 October 1855, he married Bethia Mary Spens. They had six sons and two daughters. He was succeeded as second baronet by Sir Joseph Fayrer, 2nd Baronet.

His daughter Bethia Marion Fayrer (1857-1892) married William Dobrees Herries and is buried in Canongate Kirkyard in Edinburgh.

== Select bibliography ==
- Fayrer, Joseph, Sir (1866). "Clinical surgery in India", John Churchill, London.
- Fayrer, Joseph, Sir (1872). "The Thanatophidia of India: Being a Description of the Venomous Snakes of the Indian Peninsula, with an Account of the Influence of Their Poison on Life and a Series of Experiments", pub. J. & A. Churchill, London.
- Fayrer, Joseph, Sir (1873). "Clinical and pathological observations in India", pub. J. & A. Churchill, London.
- Fayrer, Joseph, Sir (1873). "European child-life in Bengal", pub. J. & A. Churchill, London.
- Brunton, T. Lauder, Sir & Fayrer, Joseph, Sir (1873) "On the nature and physiological action of the poison of Naja tripudians and other Indian venomous snakes" , in Proceedings of the Royal Society, No 145 (1873).
- Fayrer, Joseph, Sir (1875). "The royal tiger of Bengal, his life and death", pub. J. & A. Churchill, London.
- Fayrer, Joseph, Sir (1888). 's The natural history and epidemiology of cholera : being the annual oration of the Medical Society of London, May 7, 1888, pub. J. & A. Churchill, London.
- Fayrer, Joseph, Sir (1894). "On preservation of health in India", Macmillan & Co., London.
- Fayrer, Joseph, Sir (1900). "Recollections of my life", pub. William Blackwood & sons, London.

== In popular culture ==
Fayrer appears as a supporting character in the 1977 Hindi film "Shatranj Ke Khilari", directed by Satyajit Ray and based on the short story of the same name by Munshi Premchand. In the film, he is seen having a discussion with Sir James Outram about the annexation of Oudh by the East India Company. He is played by Indian theatre director and teacher Barry John.

Baronetage of the United Kingdom
New creation	Baronet (of Devonshire Street); 1896–1907	Succeeded by Joseph Fayrer
