= Madeleine Arnot =

British sociologist

Madeleine Arnot, née MacDonald (born 1950) is a professor of Sociology of Education at the University of Cambridge, Faculty of Education. She is Director of Studies (Education) at Jesus College. Internationally known for her work on socio-cultural reproduction theory and her use of Basil Bernstein's theory of pedagogy in relation to gender and education.

== Life ==
Madeleine Arnott gained her MA at the University of Edinburgh and her PhD from the Open University. She began her career as part of the Schooling and Society team at the Open University focusing specifically on social class issues, and she has continued to be interested in the role of education in relation to social inequalities and the promotion of social equality. Since the 1980s she has developed theories of gender codes and schooling focusing on, for example, the history of co-education, the curriculum, family and schooling, youth cultures and identities. She was commissioned by the Equal Opportunities Commission to assess the national impact of Conservative educational reforms on equal opportunities in schools. In 1996–97 she directed an OFSTED commissioned project (with J. Gray, M. James and J. Rudduck) reviewing research on gender and educational performance. Her more recent publications analyse the gender policies of New Labour...

She became involved in the development of equal opportunities policy in education internationally, acting as consultant for Ministry for the Advancement of Women, Luxembourg, the Ministry of Education and Science, the Ministry of Culture and Education, Argentina, the Ministry to the Presidency, Greece, and the EC Project on Teacher Training: Ministry for Equality between the Sexes, Portugal. In 2000 she held the George A Miller Visiting Professorship of the University of Illinois, USA, and in 2005 she was visiting professor at the Institute of Education, Stockholm University (2005)

She is now interested in global citizenship education issues around girls' education in developing countries and is currently on the Steering Group for the Beyond Access: gender, education and development project and was on International Steering Group for UNESCO Education for All: Gender Monitoring Project. She is a member of the Executive Editorial Board of the British Journal of Sociology of Education, International Studies in Sociology of Education and an international editor on Gender and Education.

Married with a daughter and a son, she lives in Cambridge.

== Works ==
- "Gender, Citizenship and Marketisation: a dialogue between Madeleine Arnot and Tuula Gordon", Discourse: Studies in the Cultural Politics of Education, Volume 17, Issue 3 December 1996, pages 377 - 388
- Educating the gendered citizen: sociological engagements with national and global agendas. Taylor & Francis. 2008. ISBN 978-0-415-40805-9.
- Reproducing gender?: essays on educational theory and feminist politics. Routledge. 2002. ISBN 978-0-7507-0898-2.
- Arnot, Madeleine; Weiler, Kathleen, eds. (1993). Feminism and social justice in education: international perspectives. Routledge. ISBN 978-0-7507-0101-3.
