= Arnott's Shapes =

Brand of savoury biscuits

Arnotts Shapes
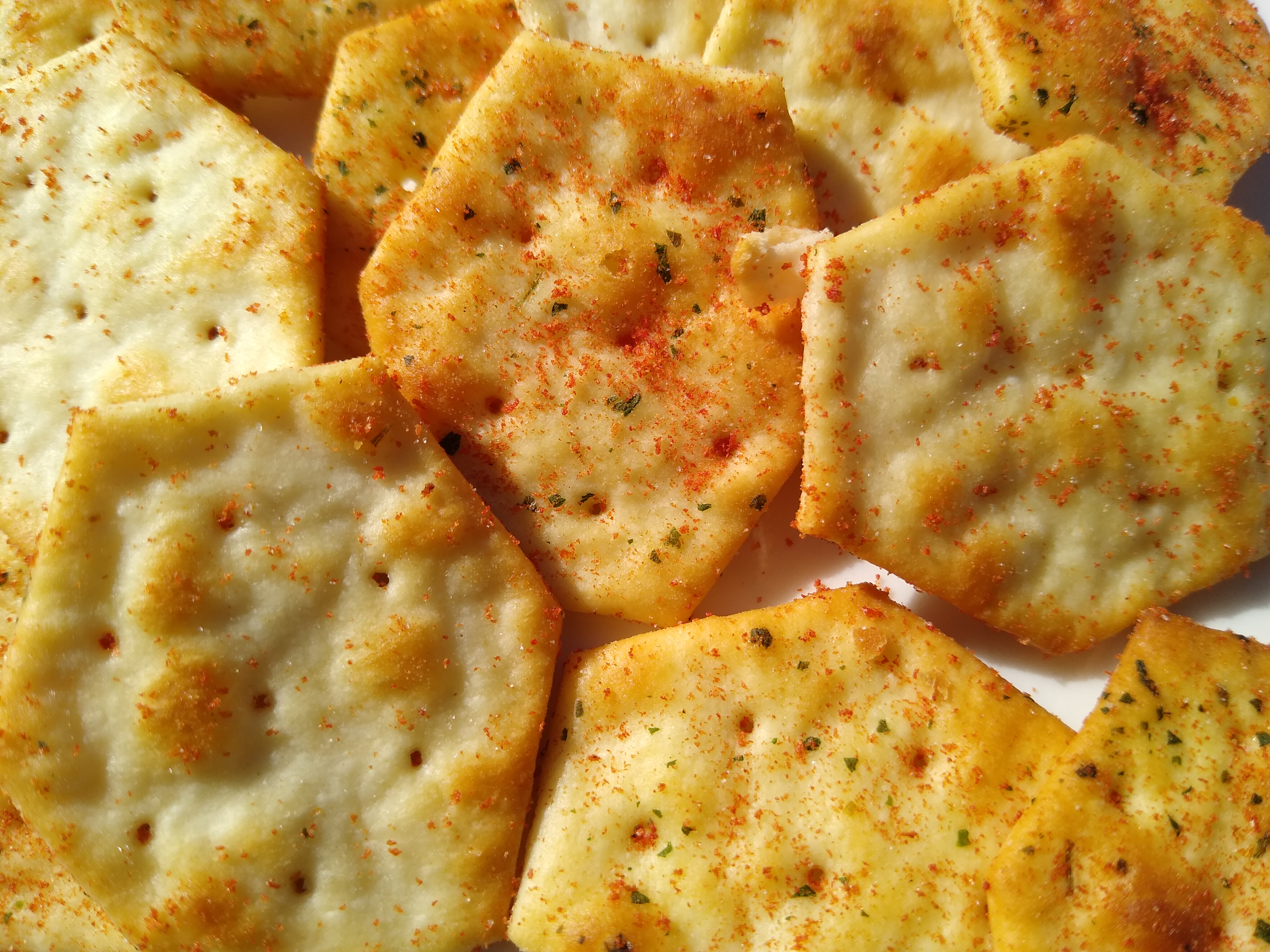
- Barbecue-flavoured Shapes
- Product type: Snack food
- Current owner: Arnott's Biscuits Holdings
- Country: Australia
- Introduced: 16 February 1954; 72 years ago
- Markets: Australia; New Zealand
- Previous owners: Brockhoff Biscuits
- Tagline: Flavour You Can See
- Website: https://www.arnotts.com/brands/shapes

Arnott's Shapes are a popular line of savoury biscuits produced by Arnott's in Australia and New Zealand. Over 53 million packets of Shapes are consumed each year in Australia.

Shapes were first introduced in 1954, in Victoria, by Brockhoff Biscuits. Savoury was the first flavour, followed soon by Barbecue, Chicken Crimpy, and Onion.

Shapes were originally made in the shape of potato chips, until bakers realised that they were too difficult to cut and were a waste of dough. In 1974, they switched to the flat biscuits that are sold today. The name "Shapes" arises from the variety of biscuit shapes, which correspond to flavour. Arnott's boasts that Shapes are "baked, not fried", which is a less fatty method of cooking; however, Shapes are still high in fat, at 20%–25%, and high in sodium.

Arnott's Shapes are sold in a variety of packaging, including multi-pack bags and boxes. In Australia, during the late 20th century, Arnott's reduced the box packaging size of the core flavours from 250 grams to 200 grams. During 2011, Arnott's further reduced the packaging size from 200 grams to 175–185 grams.

In April 2016, Arnott's altered the Shapes recipe for each of its core flavours, having the flavouring baked into the biscuit rather than as seasoning. Consumer backlash was sparked over the updated formula, prompting the company to backtrack on their decision. In September, they restored the original Pizza and Barbecue recipes under the "Originals" range, and left the recipe for Chicken Crimpy intact. To date, the pre-2016 recipe for every core flavour has been restored, with the exception of Nacho Cheese and Chicken Drumstick — the latter having been discontinued.

In 2019, Arnott's introduced an "Aussie Legends" range of Shapes, with new flavours based on popular Australian foods. Aussie Legend varieties include: Sausage Sizzle, Meat Pie, and Lamb & Rosemary.
