= David Arnot (minister) =

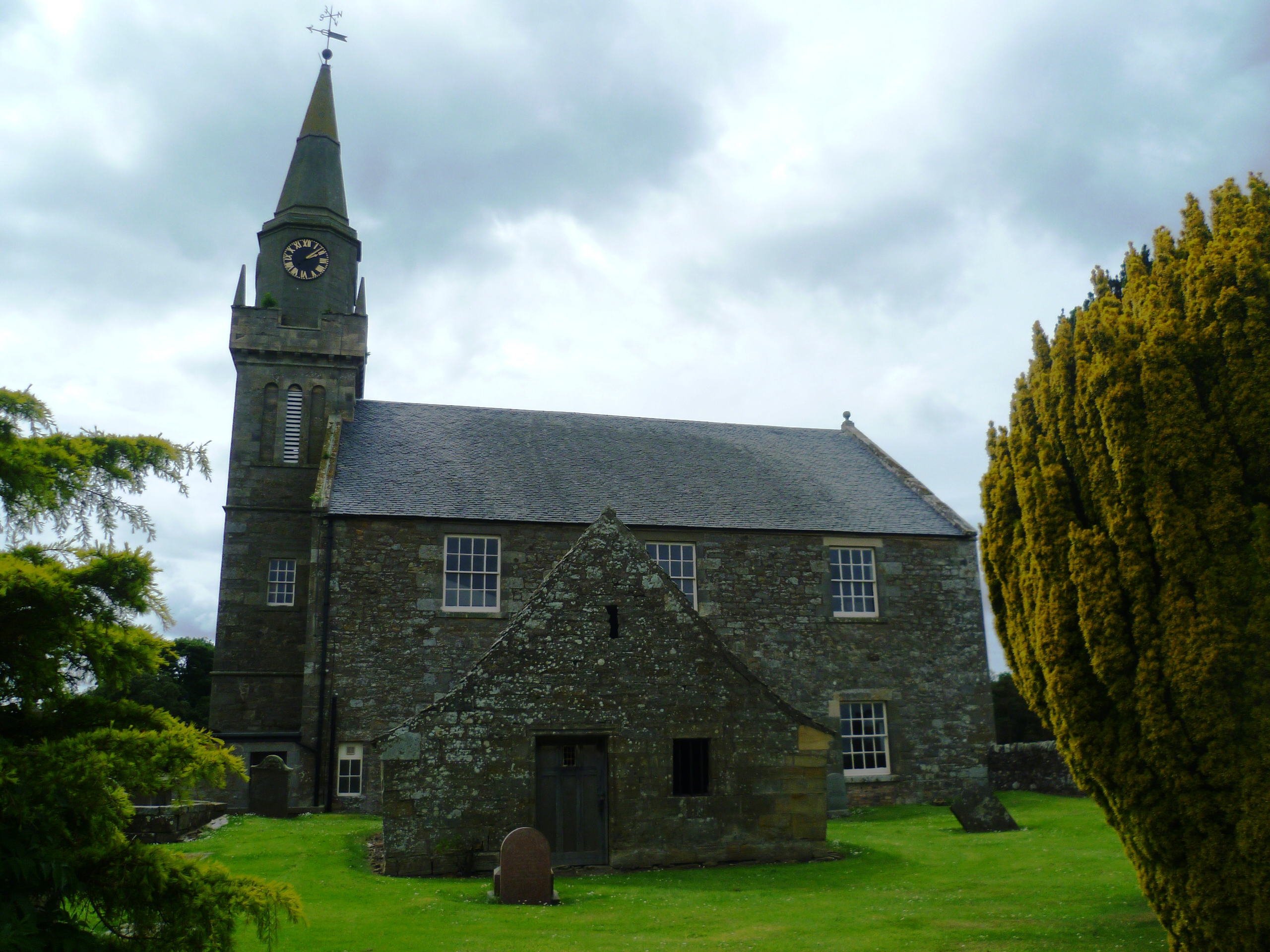
Ceres Parish Church

David Arnot(t) (1803–1877) was a Scottish minister of the Church of Scotland who served as minister of St Giles Cathedral. He was also a noted religious author, poet, painter, sculptor and a gifted musician.

== Life ==
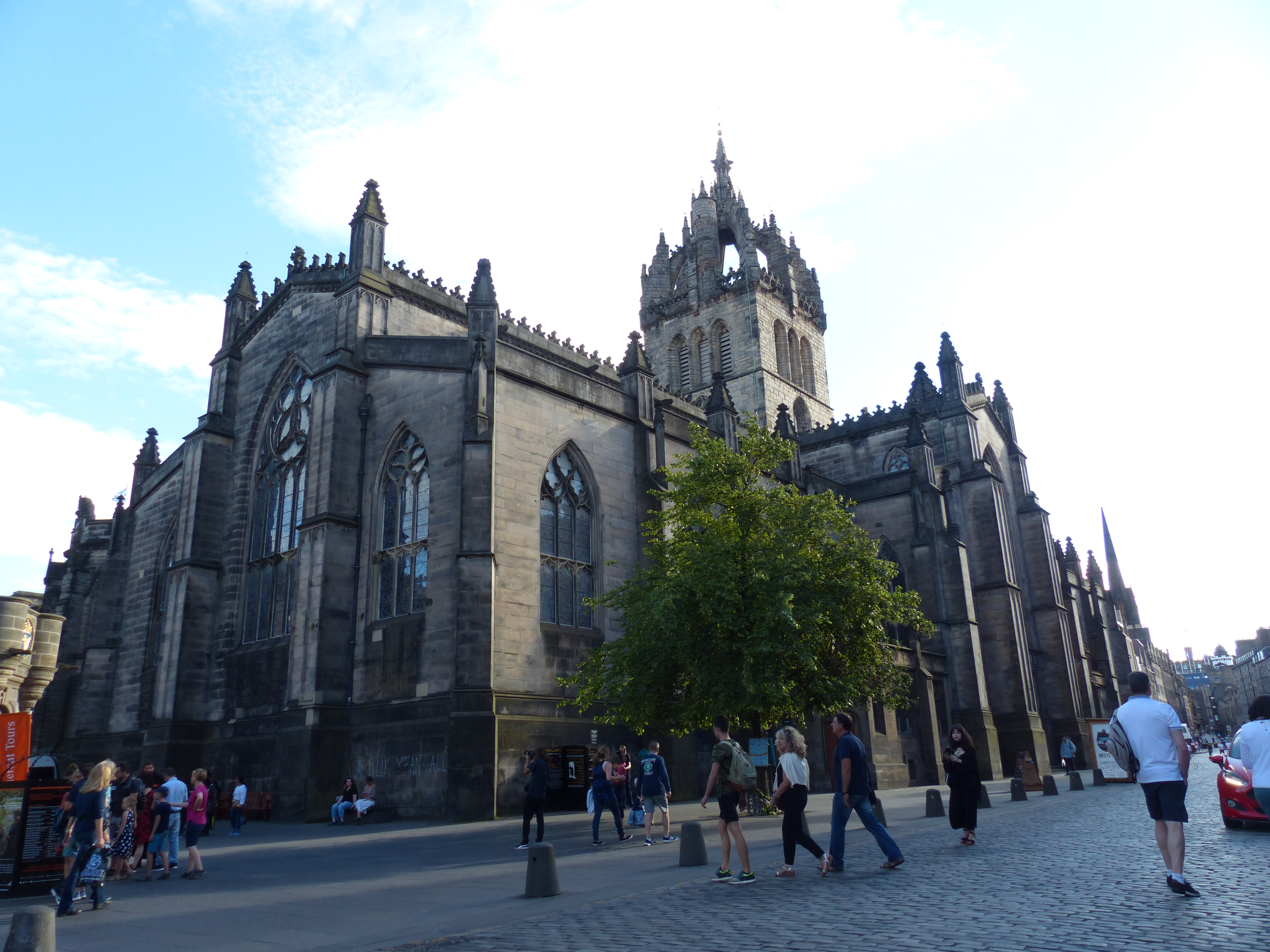
St Giles Cathedral from the east

He was born in Blacketyside farmhouse on the south Fife coast (east of Leven) on 20 March 1803 the son of Janet Kellock and her husband William Arnot, a farmer. He was educated at nearby Largo Parish School. He then studied at the University of Edinburgh and studied Divinity at St Mary's College, St Andrews. He was licensed to preach as a minister of the Church of Scotland by the Presbytery of St Andrews in 1828.

His first position was as assistant in the small parish of Ceres in Fife. In 1836 he moved to St Paul's Church in Dundee first as assistant and then as minister. Following the Disruption of 1843 he stayed in the established church and replaced Robert Gordon as minister of St Giles Cathedral. The University of St Andrews awarded him an honorary Doctor of Divinity (DD) later that year. At this stage he lived at 7 Forth Street in the New Town.

In 1845 he was one of the compilers of the Statistical Account of Scotland.

He spent his final years in a flat at 6 Archibald Place near the Edinburgh Royal Infirmary.

He died in Edinburgh on 15 May 1877 and is buried in the Grange Cemetery in the south of the city. The grave lies in the south-east section adjacent to the eastmost path. His position at St Giles was filled by Rev James Cameron Lees.

== Family ==
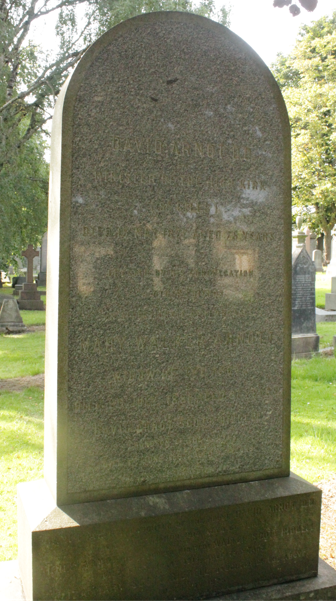
The grave of Rev David Arnot, Grange Cemetery

In 1836 he married Helen Spence Smith daughter of Captain John Smith of Leith. Their daughter Agnes (1838-1914) married Walter Scott Riddell of the Hong Kong and China Bank. Their second daughter Anna Fernie Arnot (b.1840) married James Gourlay. Their third daughter Janet Arnot (1841-1910) died unmarried. Their only son David William Arnot died in infancy.

Helen died in 1843 and in 1846 he married Mary Walker Arnott, daughter of David Walker Arnott of Arlary, widow of Lt Edward Bayley RN. They had no further children.

== Artistic recognition ==
Arnot was photographed by Hill & Adamson around 1860.

== Publications ==
- The Witches of Neil's Glen and other poems (1825)
- The Strait Gate and the Narrow Way (1838)
- The Vision Written (1841)
- The Vision Speaking (1861)
