= George Leith Roupell =

English physician

George Leith Roupell M.D. FRS (1797–1854) was an English medical doctor.

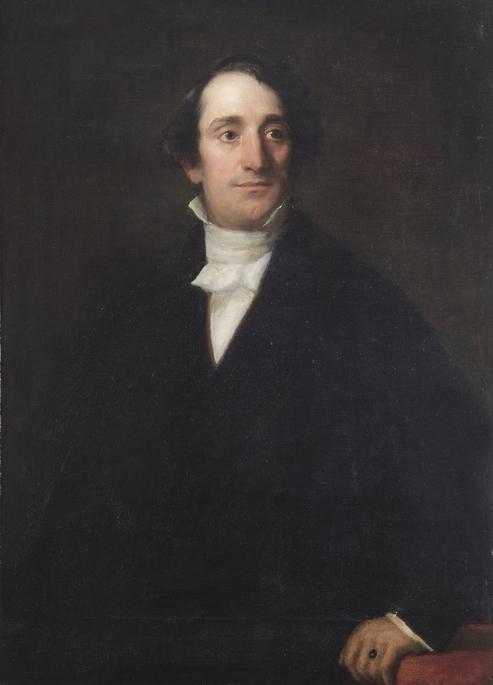
George Leith Roupell

== Life ==
The eldest son of George Boon Roupell of Chartham Park, Sussex, and his wife Frances, daughter of Robert M'Culloch of Charlton, Kent, a master in chancery, he was born on 18 September 1797; the family name was originally Rüpell, from Hesse-Cassel. He was sent to Charles Burney's school at Greenwich, and, having obtained a Tancred studentship in medicine, entered Gonville and Caius College, Cambridge, in 1815. He took no degree in arts, but graduated M.B. in 1820.

Roupell became a licentiate in medicine in 1824, and M.D. in 1825, and on 30 September 1826 was elected a fellow of the Royal College of Physicians. He was a censor in 1829, 1837, and 1838, gave the Croonian lectures in 1832 on general pathology, and in 1833 on cholera (published the same year). After some practice as physician to the Seamen's Hospital Society and to the Foundling Hospital, he was appointed physician to St. Bartholomew's Hospital on 19 June 1834, in succession to Dr. Edward Roberts.

In 1838 Roupell succeeded to his father's estates, and then was less active in practice. He became a Fellow of the Royal Society in 1839. He contracted cholera at Boulogne, and died in Welbeck Street, London, after twenty-six hours' illness, on 29 September 1854. He was unmarried.

== Works ==
Roupell published in 1833 Illustrations of the Effects of Poisons, a series of notes upon drawings made by George McWhinnie, a demonstrator at St. Bartholomew's Hospital. In 1837 he read before the College of Physicians, and then published, Some Account of a Fever prevalent in the year 1831. He proposed the name "febris typhodes rubeoloida" for this epidemic disease, of which 12 out of 75 cases were fatal, apparently what is now known as cerebrospinal meningitis.

Roupell published in 1839 A Short Treatise on Typhus Fever, based on observations made in the wards of St. Bartholomew's Hospital, but mainly using extracts from other writers. He noted the infection of typhus being conveyed by a corpse. He mentioned that 136 students of anatomy at St. Bartholomew's minutely dissected 17 bodies, in which the cause of death was typhus; just two took the disease, and these had been exposed to living patients.
