= John Arnott (Scottish footballer) =

Scottish footballer

Personal information
- Full name: John Arnott
- Place of birth: Scotland
- Position: Outside left

Senior career*
Years	Team	Apps	(Gls)
- Weir's Recreation
1932	Queen's Park	1	(0)

International career
1932	Scotland Amateurs	2	(0)
- * Club domestic league appearances and goals

John Arnott was a Scottish amateur football outside forward who played in the Scottish League for Queen's Park. He was capped by Scotland at amateur level.
