= William Barrowby =

English physician

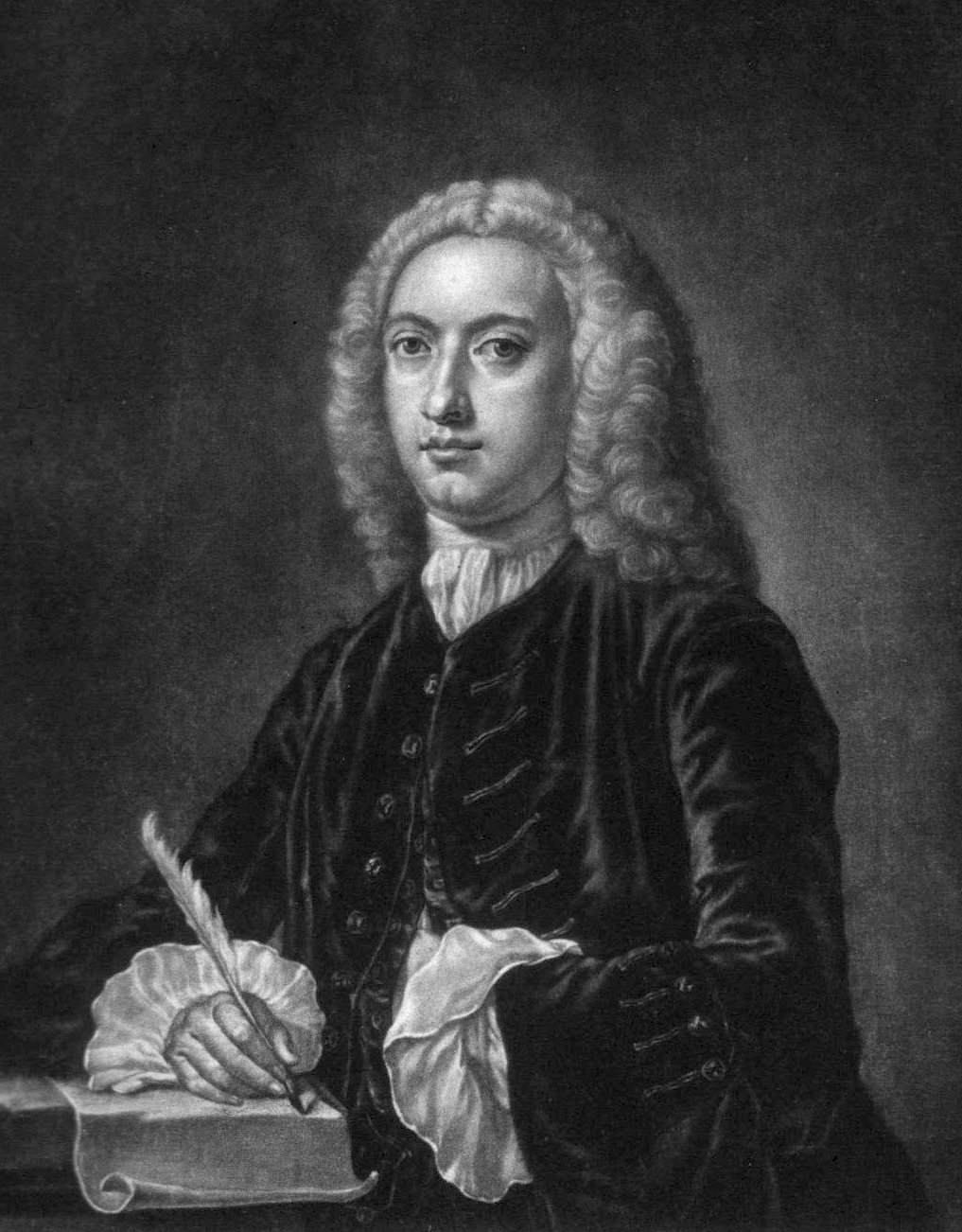
- William Barrowby
- Born: 1681; London, England
- Died: 30 December 1751 (aged 69–70)
- Occupation: English physician

William Barrowby FRS FRCP (1682 – 30 December 1758) was an English physician.

== Life ==
Barrowby was born in London, the son of John Barrowby, a physician. He was educated at Eton and Trinity College, Oxford, taking degrees of M.B. in 1709, and of M.D. in 1713. He was elected a fellow of the College of Physicians of London in 1718, and Fellow of the Royal Society in 1721.
