= Frank Nicholls =

English physician

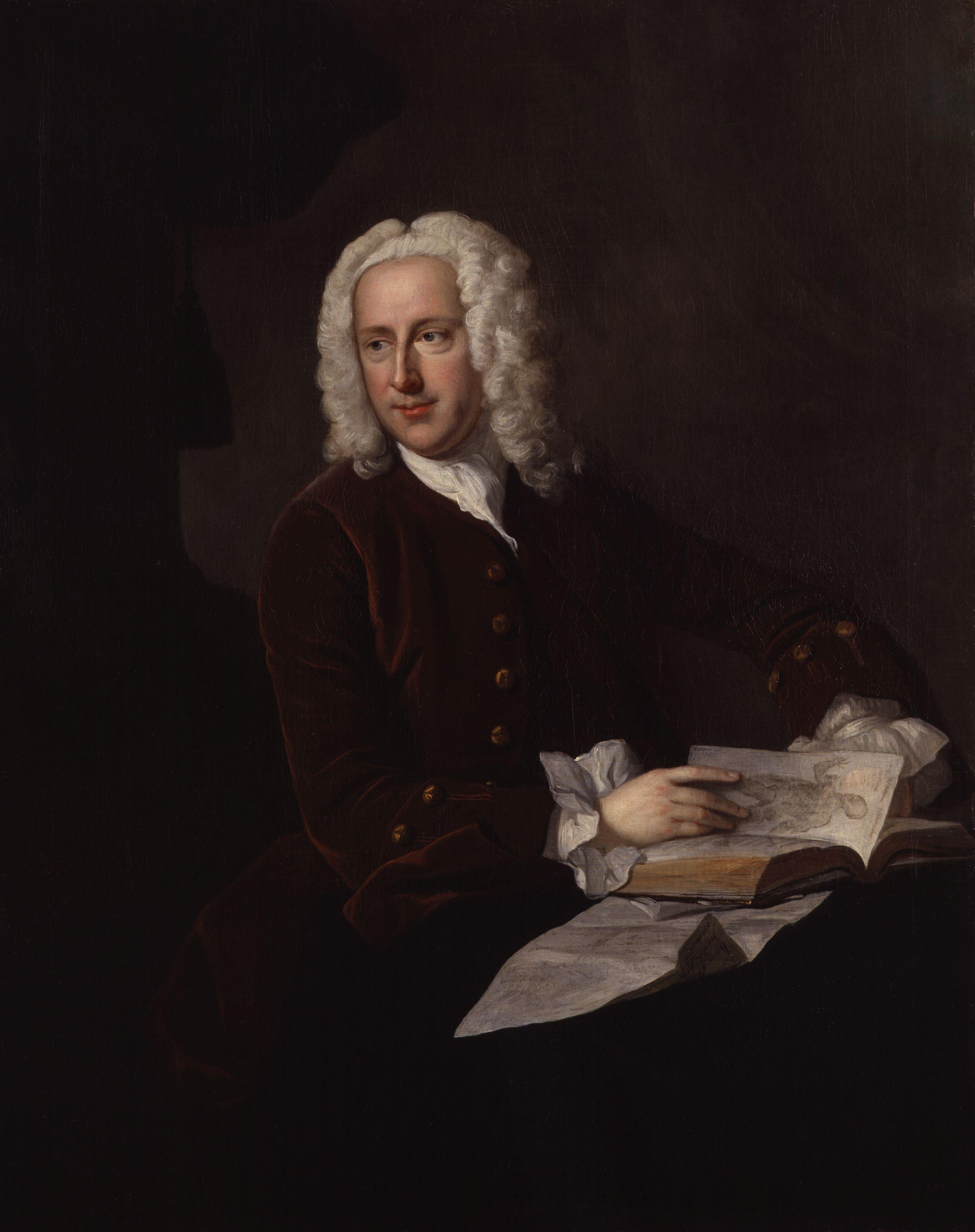
Portrait of Frank Nicholls attributed to Thomas Hudson, circa 1745-1748

Frank Nicholls (1699 – 7 January 1778) was an English physician. He was elected a Fellow of the Royal Society in 1728. He was made reader of anatomy at Oxford University when young and moved to London in the 1730s.

== Life ==
The second son of John Nicholls (d. 1714) of Trereife, Cornwall, a barrister, he was born in London. He was educated at Westminster School, and went to Exeter College, Oxford, where he entered 4 March 1714, his tutor being John Haviland. Besides the classics, he studied physics; he graduated B.A. 14 November 1718, M.A. 12 June 1721, M.B. 16 February 1724, M.D. 16 March 1729.

He lectured at Oxford on anatomy, as a reader in the university, before he graduated in medicine. His lectures were well attended, and were mostly devoted to minute anatomy, then seldom taught. He demonstrated the minute structure of blood vessels, showed before the Royal Society experiments proving that the inner and middle coat of an artery could be ruptured while the outer remained entire, and thus made clear the method of formation of chronic aneurysm, which had not before been understood. He noticed that the arteries were supplied with nerves, and pointed out that these probably regulated blood pressure. He was the first to make corroded preparations, in which a particular part of an organ is left prominent after an injection, the surrounding structures being removed piecemeal.

After a short period of practice as a physician in Cornwall, he settled in London. He was elected F.R.S. 1728, and a fellow of the Royal College of Physicians 1732. He attended some of Winslow's lectures in France, and saw Giovanni Battista Morgagni and Santorinus in Italy; and on his return began to give anatomical lectures in London. In 1734 he gave the Gulstonian lectures at the College of Physicians, ‘On the Structure of the Heart and the Circulation of the Blood;’ and again in 1736 ‘On the Urinary Organs, with the Causes, Symptoms, and Cure of Stone.’ He delivered the Harveian oration in 1739, and the Lumleian lectures 1748–9, of which the inaugural lecture, ‘De Anima Medica,’ was given 16 December 1748, and was published in 1750 (2nd edit. 1771; 3rd edit. 1773).

The college elected in 1749 a junior into the body of the elects, or council, over his head, whereupon he resigned his Lumleian lectureship. In 1753 he was appointed physician to George II. He examined the body of the king after death, and discovered a rupture of the right ventricle, which he described in a letter to George Parker, 2nd Earl of Macclesfield, President of the Royal Society, and this is printed in the Philosophical Transactions for 1760.

To aid in his son John's education he went to Oxford in 1762, and, when his son had graduated, to Epsom, where he lived till his death, 7 January 1778. His health was never very good, and he had attacks of fever at intervals throughout life, sometimes accompanied by the formation of abscesses. Of this disorder, probably tuberculosis, he died.

== Works ==
In 1732 he published in Oxford a compendium of his lectures, and in 1738 he had published in London an enlarged edition, ‘Compendium Anatomico-œconomicum,’ a tabular summary of anatomy, physiology, morbid anatomy, pharmacology, and midwifery, in seventy-eight quarto pages, with diagrams. Similar summaries on a smaller scale existed, by William Harvey and Christopher Terne; those of Nicholls may have been suggested by the printed anatomical tables of Sir Charles Scarburgh.

An anonymous pamphlet, ‘The Petition of the Unborn Babes to the Censors of the Royal College of Physicians of London,’ published in 1751, is attributed to him. It is against lying-in hospitals; it shows that there were differences between him and some of the senior fellows of the college. Pocus in the work represented, it is said, Dr. Robert Nesbit; Maulus, Dr. Maule; and Barebone, Dr. William Barrowby. It was answered by ‘A Vindication of Man Midwifery,’ 1752.

== Family ==
He married Elizabeth, daughter of Dr. Richard Mead, and had five children. There survived of these one daughter; and one son John (c. 1745–1832), a barrister-at-law of Lincoln's Inn, who was MP for Bletchingley 1783–87, and for Tregony 1798–1802.
