= Patrick Black =

Scottish physician

- Born: 1813; Aberdeen
- Died: 12 October 1879 (aged 65–66)
- Occupation: Physician

Patrick Black, M.D. (1813 – 12 October 1879) was a Scottish physician.

== Biography ==
Black was son of Colonel Patrick Black, of the Bengal cavalry, and like his father was called after his ancestor, Sir Patrick Dun, president of the Irish College of Physicians in 1681. He was born at Aberdeen in 1813. He was sent to Eton in 1828, matriculated at Christ Church in 1831, and graduated M.D. at Oxford in 1836. In 1842 he was elected assistant physician to St. Bartholomew's Hospital, in 1851 Warden of its college, in 1860 physician to the hospital, and somewhat later lecturer on medicine in the school. Black was a tall and handsome man, and the trust which his open countenance encouraged was never disappointed. He was a careful observer, a just reasoner, well read in medicine, a scholar who enjoyed literature, a physician who, as one of his patients remarked, hastened no one into the grave, yet he never attained a large practice. That he was a man of considerable property perhaps stood in his way, but another reason was that he had so little belief in treatment that both students and patients perceived that he regarded his own prescription as a ceremonial observance rather than as a practical measure. He even questioned the value of quinine as a remedy for ague. In 1855 Black wrote a short treatise: ‘Chloroform; how shall we ensure safety in its administration?’ In 1867 he revised the Latin part of the ‘Nomenclature of Diseases’ for the College of Physicians, of which he was a fellow and three times censor. In 1876 he published a popular lecture on ‘Respiration,’ a pamphlet on ‘Scurvy,’ and an ‘Essay on the Use of the Spleen.’ His sceptical turn of mind is noticeable in all: he doubts whether chloroform ever causes death except by simple suffocation, doubts whether lime juice prevents scurvy, and doubts whether the spleen does anything but regulate the current of the blood. His scepticism was an infirmity which prevented his accumulated observation from yielding its proper fruit, but it did not affect his personal relations with mankind. He was sound in his judgment of character, firm in his friendship, and universal in his kindness. He died on 12 October 1879. His colleague, Dr. Reginald Southey, wrote his memoir in the St. Bartholomew's Hospital Reports, vol. xv., and his former house physician, Dr. R. Bridges, published in 1876 a Latin poem dedicated to Dr. Black. and describing in Ovidian verse his personal appearance, character, and manner of teaching.
