= Arnott =

Arnott may refer to:

- Arnott (surname)
- Arnott, Ontario, Canada
- Arnott, Wisconsin, United States
- Arnott (automobile), a car made by Arnott's Garages
- Arnott's Biscuits, a subsidiary of the Campbell Soup Company of America
  - Arnott's Shapes, a savoury cracker produced by Arnott's
- Arnotts (Ireland), a department store in Dublin
- Arnotts (Scotland), a department store in Glasgow
- Arnott baronets, a British baronetcy since 1896
- Arnott Air Suspension Products, an aftermarket automobile parts company headquartered in the United States

== See also ==
- George Arnott Walker-Arnott (1799–1868), Scottish botanist
- Robert Arnott Wilson (born 1958), group theorist
- Arnot (disambiguation)
