= Donald Hunter (physician) =

British physician and medical writer (1898–1978)

Donald Hunter CBE FRCP (11 February 1898 – 11 December 1978) was a British physician and writer of a text on occupational medicine, The Diseases of Occupations.

== Life and works ==
Hunter was born in the East End of London. His father was George Hunter, a deputy engineer in the General Post Office. He entered The London Hospital in 1915 but left in World War I to become a surgeon probationer RNVR in HMS Faulkner in the Dover Patrol. After the war, he returned to The London Hospital and qualified in 1920.

Following a series of house appointments, he became first assistant to Lord Dawson of Penn (1864–1945) and then was appointed Assistant Physician to The London Hospital in 1927. He completed his MD degree in 1922 and FRCP in 1929.

Hunter became curator to the Medical School Museum in 1933, and during his 30 years in office collected specimens representing all of morbid anatomy. He later became Director of the Medical Research Council’s Department for Research in Industrial Medicine at The London Hospital. In 1925 he married Mathilda Bugnion, a graduate from Somerville College, Oxford and daughter of a Lutheran Pastor from Lausanne, Switzerland. They had four children, two of whom became doctors.

In 1935 he gave a series of lectures to the Derby Medical Society on occupational diseases. These lectures were followed by other publications, often jointly with colleagues. These all culminated in his 1955 book The Diseases of Occupations. It has been criticized as lacking in balance and being sometimes irrelevant, but being entertaining and readable.

There followed a Penguin Book Health in Industry published in 1959. Hunter was founder Editor of the British Journal of Industrial Medicine.

== Memorials ==
Hunter's memory is preserved not only by his book but also by a Donald Hunter Room at the Royal College of Physicians. There is also a Donald Hunter House in London which provides accommodation for students.

== Sources ==
Donald Hunter CBE MD FRCP, Geoffrey O Storey. Journal of Medical Biography, Vol.15, No.3, pp. 153–157
