= Arnott baronets =

Baronetcy in the Baronetage of the United Kingdom

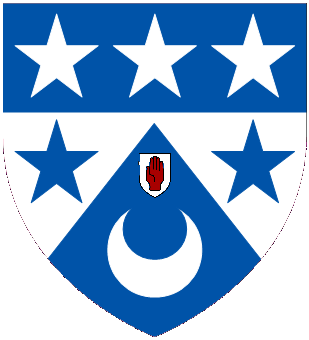
- Escutcheon of the Arnott baronets of Woodlands, St Ann
- Creation date: 1896. Granted 8 February 1896 by Arthur Edward Vicars, Ulster King of Arms.
- Status: extant
- Motto: Speratum et completum, Hoped for and realized
- Arms: Per chevron Argent and Azure in chief two mullets and in base a crescent counterchanged on a chief of the second three mullets of the first.
- Crest: On a wreath of the colours a tower on a rock Proper with a pennon of one point statant Azure.

The Arnott Baronetcy, of Woodlands in the Parish of St Anne, Shandon in the County of Cork, is a title in the Baronetage of the United Kingdom. It was created on 12 February 1896 for the Irish entrepreneur and philanthropist John Arnott.

== Arnott baronets, of Woodlands, St Anne (1896) ==
- Sir John Arnott, 1st Baronet (1814–1898)
- Sir John Alexander Arnott, 2nd Baronet (1853–1940)
- Sir Lauriston John Arnott, 3rd Baronet (1890–1958)
- Sir Robert John Arnott, 4th Baronet (1896–1966)
- Sir John Robert Alexander Arnott, 5th Baronet (1927–1981)
- Sir Alexander John Maxwell Arnott, 6th Baronet (born 1975)

The heir presumptive is the present holder's brother Andrew John Eric Arnott (born 1978).

== See also ==
- Arnot baronets

Baronetage of the United Kingdom
Preceded by Fayrer baronets	Arnott baronets of Woodlands, St Anne; 12 February 1896	Succeeded by Lewis baronets
