= Arnot baronets =

Extinct baronetcy in the Baronetage of Nova Scotia

- Escutcheon of the Arnot baronets of Arnot
- Creation date: 1629
- Status: extinct
- Extinction date: 1838

The Arnot Baronetcy was a title in the Baronetage of Nova Scotia. It was created on 27 July 1629 for Michael Arnot with remainder to heirs male whatsoever. His grandson, the second Baronet, represented Kinross in the Scottish Parliament. The title became extinct or dormant on the death of the ninth Baronet in 1838.

== Arnot baronets, of Arnot (1629) ==
- Sir Michael Arnot, 1st Baronet (died c. 1680)
  - Charles Arnot (died before 1652)
- Sir David Arnot, 2nd Baronet (died 1711)
- Sir John Arnot, 3rd Baronet (died 1750)
- Sir John Arnot, 4th Baronet (died c. 1762)
- Sir John Arnot, 5th Baronet (died c. 1765)
- Sir Robert Arnot, 6th Baronet (died 1767)
- Sir William Arnot, 7th Baronet (died 1782)
- Sir Matthew Robert Arnot, 8th Baronet died 1801)
- Sir William Arnot, 9th Baronet (died 1838)

== See also ==
- Arnott baronets
