= List of presidents of the Royal College of Physicians =

The president of the Royal College of Physicians (RCP) is the elected head of the Royal College of Physicians of England, which was founded by letters patent from King Henry VIII in 1518. The president is elected annually late in the year.

== Presidents of the Royal College of Physicians ==
- 1518–1524 Thomas Linacre
- 1526 Thomas Bentley
- 1527–1528 Richard Bartlot
- 1529–1530 Thomas Bentley
- 1531 Richard Bartlot
- 1541–1543 Edward Wotton
- 1544 John Clement
- 1545–1546 William Freeman
- 1547 John Burgess
- 1548 Richard Bartlot
- 1549–1550 John Fryer
- 1551–1552 Robert Huicke
- 1553–1554 George Owen
- 1555–1560 John Caius
- 1561 Richard Masters
- 1562–1563 John Caius
- 1564–1567 Robert Huicke
- 1568 Thomas Francis
- 1569 John Symings
- 1570 Richard Caldwell
- 1571 John Caius
- 1572 John Symings
- 1581–1584 Roger Giffard
- 1585–1588 Richard Smith
- 1589–1600 William Baronsdale
- 1600 William Gilbert
- 1601–1603 Richard Forster
- 1604–1606 Thomas Langton (died in office)
- 1606–1608 Henry Atkins
- 1609–1611 Sir William Paddy
- 1612–1614 Thomas Moundeford
- 1615 Richard Forster (died in office)
- 1616–1617 Henry Atkins
- 1618 Sir William Paddy
- 1619 Thomas Moundeford
- 1620 Richard Palmer
- 1621–1623 Thomas Moundeford
- 1624 Henry Atkins
- 1625–1627 John Argent
- 1628 John Giffard
- 1629–1633 John Argent
- 1634–1640 Simeon Fox
- 1641–1644 Othowell Meverell
- 1645–1650 John Clarke
- 1650–1654 Sir Francis Prujean
- 1655–1666 Edward Alston
- 1667–1669 Francis Glisson
- 1670–1675 Sir George Ent
- 1676–1681 Sir John Micklethwaite
- 1682 Thomas Coxe
- 1683 Daniel Whistler
- 1684–1687 Sir Thomas Witherley
- 1688 George Rogers
- 1689–1691 Walter Charleton
- 1692–1693 Thomas Burwell
- 1694 John Lawson
- 1695 Samuel Collins
- 1696–1703 Sir Thomas Millington (died in office)
- 1704–1707 Edward Browne (died in office); his replacement Josiah Clerk then stood down because of bad health
- 1708–1712 Charles Goodall (died in office)
- 1712–1716 William Dawes
- 1716–1718 John Bateman
- 1719–1735 Sir Hans Sloane, Bt.
- 1735–1739 Thomas Pellett
- 1740–1745 Henry Plumptre
- 1746–1749 Richard Tyson (died in office)
- 1750 James Jurin (died in office)
- 1750–1753 William Wasey
- 1754–1763 Thomas Reeve.
- 1764 William Battie
- 1765–1766 Sir William Browne
- 1767–1774 Thomas Lawrence
- 1775–1784 William Pitcairn
- 1785–1790 Sir George Baker, Bt.
- 1791 Thomas Gisborne
- 1792–1793 Sir George Baker, Bt.
- 1794 Thomas Gisborne
- 1795 Sir George Baker, Bt.
- 1796–1803 Thomas Gisborne
- 1804–1810 Sir Lucas Pepys Bt
- 1811–1812 Sir Francis Milman, Bt.
- 1813–1819 John Latham
- 1820–1843 Sir Henry Halford, Bt.
- 1844–1856 John Ayrton Paris
- 1857–1861 Thomas Mayo
- 1862–1866 Sir Thomas Watson, Bt.
- 1867–1870 Sir James Alderson
- 1871–1875 Sir George Burrows, 1st Baronet
- 1876–1880 Sir James Risdon Bennett
- 1881–1887 Sir William Jenner, Bt.
- 1888–1892 Sir Andrew Clark, 1st Baronet
- 1893–1895 Sir John Russell Reynolds, 1st Baronet
- 1896–1898 Sir Samuel Wilks, Bt.
- 1899–1904 Sir William Selby Church, Bt.
- 1905–1909 Sir Richard Douglas Powell, Bt.
- 1910–1914 Sir Thomas Barlow, 1st Baronet
- 1915–1917 Sir Frederick Taylor, Bt.
- 1918–1921 Sir Norman Moore, 1st Baronet
- 1922–1925 Sir Humphry Rolleston
- 1926–1930 Sir John Bradford
- 1931–1937 The Viscount Dawson of Penn
- 1938–1940 Sir Robert Hutchison, 1st Baronet
- 1941–1949 The Lord Moran
- 1950–1957 Sir Walter Russell Brain, Bt.
- 1957–1962 Sir Robert Platt, Bt. (later Lord Platt)
- 1962–1966 Sir Edward Charles Dodds, Bt.
- 1966–1972 Lord Rosenheim of Camden
- 1972–1977 Sir Cyril Astley Clarke
- 1977–1983 Sir Douglas Andrew Kilgour Black
- 1983–1989 Sir Raymond Hoffenberg
- 1989–1992 Dame Margaret Turner-Warwick
- 1992–1997 Sir Leslie Arnold Turnberg (later Lord Turnberg)
- 1997–2002 Sir Kurt George Alberti
- 2002–2006 Dame Carol M. Black
- 2006–2010 Sir Ian Gilmore
- 2010–2014 Sir Richard Thompson
- 2014–2018 Dame Jane Dacre
- 2018–2022 Sir Andrew Goddard
- 2022–2024 Sarah Clarke
- 2024–present Mumtaz Patel (interim 2024 and then elected in 2025)

== Bibliography ==
- Briggs, Asa (2005). A History of the Royal College of Physicians of London. Oxford University Press. ISBN 978-0-19-925334-0.
- Roll of the Royal College of Physicians
- Royal College of Physicians
