= Sarah Clarke (cardiologist) =

British cardiologist (born 1965)

Sarah Clarke FRCP FACC FESC
- Born: 1965 (age 60–61)
- Education: University of Cambridge
- Known for: President of the British Cardiovascular Society (2015–2018); President of the Royal College of Physicians (RCP) of London (2022–2024)
- Spouse: Sebastian Alexander
- Scientific career
- Fields: Cardiology; Interventional cardiology
- Workplaces: Royal Papworth Hospital

Sarah Catherine Clarke (born 1965) is a British consultant cardiologist and was the president of the Royal College of Physicians (RCP) of London between September 2022 and June 2024.

Born in 1965, Clarke studied medicine at Girton College, University of Cambridge. She completed a fellowship in interventional cardiology at Harvard University in 2001 and became a consultant cardiologist in 2002. Clarke was the president of the British Cardiovascular Society between 2015 and 2018.

Clarke resigned as RCP President in June 2024 following an expression of no confidence in her leadership, by over 80 fellows and five of the college's six senior officers, over her handling of the physician associates policy dispute.

== Early life, education, and personal life ==
Clarke was born in 1965. She was inspired to study medicine after undertaking a research assistantship at the Royal Marsden Hospital in Sutton, London with Professor Trevor Powles, an oncologist. Clarke graduated from Girton College, University of Cambridge in 1989. After completing house officer jobs locally, she joined the cardiology specialty training programme and worked at the Papworth Hospital and Addenbrooke's Hospital. Clarke had to combat bias during her training programme where her supervisors attempted to dissuade her from pursuing interventional cardiology as a sub-speciality because she was a woman and may take career breaks. She completed a fellowship in interventional cardiology at Harvard University in 2001 and the following year became a consultant cardiologist at Papworth Hospital. In 2004, she obtained an MD degree from the University of Cambridge. Two years later Clarke was elected a fellow of the RCP. She is also a fellow of the European Society of Cardiology and the American College of Cardiology. Clarke is married to Dr Sebastian Alexander, a former GP partner who also worked for NHS Digital as the Strategic Clinical Lead for Patient Safety.

== Career ==
She served as the president of the British Cardiovascular Society between 2015 and 2018 and was the first woman to hold the role. In 2017, she was appointed as a joint national lead for cardiology for the Getting It Right First Time (GIRFT) programme. Clarke is the deputy chair of the British Heart Foundation and the clinical director for strategic development at Royal Papworth Hospital. In the latter role, she was a key figure in the hospital's relocation to a site in Cambridge which opened in 2019 including its redesign to be tailored more to patients. Clarke was the clinical vice-president of the RCP between 2019 and 2022. She was selected by the RCP council to become the president of the RCP of London in July 2022. This was after geriatrician David Oliver, the winner of the presidential election in April, withdrew from the presidency in July for personal reasons.

Clarke became president on 14 September 2022. In an interview with The Times, published on 24 September 2022, she commented that she did not support junior doctors going on strike as although she had sympathy with their concerns this did not override the potential impact on patient care. The British Medical Association (BMA), a doctors' trade union, responded to the article by commenting that they felt that the "greatest risk to patient care" was from "government policies and a lack of coherent workforce plan" and asked for Clarke to apologise. She sent an apologetic message to RCP members two days later, in which she criticised the headline of the article as being "misrepresentative" and stated that she and the RCP supported trade union members' right to take industrial action. Clarke received a challenge for the presidency in 2023 by Professor John Alcolado and won re-election in April 2023 with 53.2% of the vote on a turnout of 25.9%.

Clarke chaired an extraordinary general meeting (EGM) of RCP fellows on 13 March 2024 on issues related to physician associates (PAs) including their scope of practice, accountability, impact on training opportunities, pace and scale of the role's expansion, and regulation. Fellows were invited to vote on five motions including a call to "limit the pace and scale of the roll-out" of PAs until issues of regulation, standards and scope of practice" had been addressed. The day before the EGM, she published an opinion piece in The BMJ voicing her support for PAs and the expansion of the role in the NHS. Clarke initially did not declare any competing interests but on 19 March 2024 amended the piece to include that the RCP "receives membership and examination fees from physician associates..." and "therefore risks a financial loss from a limit in the rollout of PAs".

Some doctors who had attended the EGM criticised how the meeting was conducted and how survey data was presented to fellows. Palliative care doctor and writer Rachel Clarke commented that there was a "lack of respect" shown from the leadership towards fellows and subsequently withdrew from the RCP's annual conference in April 2024 in which she was due to be the keynote speaker. Kamran Abbasi, the editor of The BMJ, called the EGM a "misjudgment of mood, safety concerns, and data". At the EGM, Deputy Registrar Professor Jamie Read presented the RCP leadership's interpretation of a membership survey on PAs that they said showed that members were broadly positive towards the expansion of PAs and that they were overall appropriately supervised and that their role was well-understood. On 18 March 2024, the RCP released a summary of the survey data. Professor Trisha Greenhalgh commented that this summary showed the RCP had presented a "flawed and distorted version" of its findings. The summary showed that the majority of members felt that PAs negatively impacted training opportunities, that the role was unclear, and "were not appropriately supervised in secondary care". Read resigned as Deputy Registrar and became the inaugural Dean of Lincoln Medical School in April 2024. The RCP announced that they were undertaking a "major governance refresh" in response to a "huge strength of feeling among our fellows and members". RCP Registrar Professor Cathryn Edwards, the first woman to hold the role, announced on 19 March 2024 that she would be standing down in May 2024 to set up a life coaching business. Fellows voted for all five motions including one which called for a pause in the roll out of the PA role in the NHS which Clarke and the RCP leadership had opposed. In response to the vote, she announced that the Faculty of Physician Associates would close within a year.

Clarke faced calls to resign as president in June 2024 over her handling of the physician associate issue. Five of the six senior officers of the RCP met with Clarke on 9 June 2024 and asked her to resign over a perceived lack of confidence after over 80 fellows including three council members signed a statement of concern in the college's leadership on the issue. Ten days later she announced her intention to resign in September, following a transition period. In response, a number of fellows criticised the decision for a delay in her resignation. The following day, the RCP announced that Clarke would be resigning "with immediate effect".

She was succeeded as president by the RCP's senior censor and vice president for education and training Mumtaz Patel on an interim basis before Patel was later elected by fellows in 2025.

== Select publications ==
- Dobson, Rebecca; Clarke, Sarah C (May 2022). "Women in cardiology: narrowing the gender gap". Heart. 108 (10): 757–759. doi:10.1136/heartjnl-2021-320144. ISSN 1355-6037. PMC 9046733. PMID 35459724.
- Clarke SC; Kelleher J; Lloyd-Jones H; Slack M; Schofiel PM (1 September 2002). "A study of hormone replacement therapy in postmenopausal women with ischaemic heart disease: the Papworth HRT atherosclerosis study". BJOG: an International Journal of Obstetrics and Gynaecology. 109 (9): 1056–1062. doi:10.1111/j.1471-0528.2002.01544.x. ISSN 1470-0328. PMID 12269682. Wikidata Q44147950.
- Joanne T. Brindle; Henrik Antti; Elaine Holmes; et al. (25 November 2002). "Rapid and noninvasive diagnosis of the presence and severity of coronary heart disease using 1H-NMR-based metabonomics". Nature medicine. 8 (12): 1439-1444, 1439-1445. doi:10.1038/nm1202-802. ISSN 1078-8956. PMID 12447357. Wikidata Q44226354.

Academic offices
Preceded by Andrew Goddard	President of the Royal College of Physicians; 2022–2024	Succeeded by Mumtaz Patel
