= Jane Dacre =

British rheumatologist

Dame Jane Dacre DBE

President of the Royal College of Physicians of London
- In office September 2014 – September 2018
- Preceded by: Sir Richard Thompson
- Succeeded by: Sir Andrew Goddard

Personal details
- Born: 11 November 1955 (age 70)
- Spouse: Nigel Dacre (m. 1979)
- Children: 3
- Education: University College Hospital Medical School

Dame Jane Elizabeth Dacre (née Verrill; born 11 November 1955) is a retired British rheumatologist and president of the Medical Protection Society since 2018. She is an emeritus professor of medical education at University College London, a previous director of UCL Medical School, past president of the Royal College of Physicians (RCP) of London (2014 to 2018) and past medical director of the MRCP(UK) exam. Dacre has also been the president of the Medical Women's Federation since May 2025.

== Early life and education ==
Dacre was born on 1 November 1955 to Dr Peter John Verrill and Christine Rothwell. Her early education was at Channing School, a private girls' school in Highgate, North London. Her father was a doctor and her mother a housewife. She has three brothers; Richard is a retired general practitioner, Mark is a medical oncologist, and John is an insolvency lawyer. Dacre studied medicine at University College Hospital Medical School (which was the alma mater of her father), graduating in 1980. All her brothers also studied at University College London. She was awarded a Doctor of Medicine (MD) degree in 1992 from the University of London. She credits her father, a consultant anaesthetist who was the dean of University College Hospital Medical School from 1984 to 1994, as the inspiration for becoming a doctor. He died in 2006 of postoperative complications following a sigmoid colectomy.

== Career ==
Dacre trained in rheumatology at St Bartholomew's Hospital and became a consultant at the Whittington Hospital in North London. She had worked a job share with Tim Spector in the late 1980s as a rheumatology and general medicine specialty registrar to help her manage childcare and for him to undertake epidemiological research. At St Bartholomew's Hospital she also worked as a registrar with gastroenterologist Parveen Kumar who she cites as an inspiration for balancing her career with motherhood. Dacre became interested in teaching clinical skills and procedures after an experience as a registrar where she placed a temporary pacing wire in an emergency overnight having no training and became the clinical lead of the first UK clinical skills centre at St Bartholomew's Hospital. Dacre has also made contributions to the physical examination of the musculoskeletal system and medical education research. This has included the GALS screen and studies on the performance of doctors at postgraduate exams, including the influence of gender and ethnic background. She was a member of the GMC's council from 2009 to 2012, director of UCL Medical School between 2011 and 2014 and the medical director of the MRCP(UK) exam from 2010 to 2013.

From 2014 to 2018 she was president of the RCP, having previously served as academic vice president of the college. She was elected with 1,848 votes of 4,933 fellows on a margin of 281. Dacre succeeded gastroenterologist Sir Richard Thompson. While president of the RCP, she was a strong advocate for expansion of physician associates in the NHS and helped set up the Faculty of Physician Associates in 2015 with the UK Association of Physician Associates and Health Education England. She also oversaw the early development of the Spine building in Liverpool as a new northern headquarters for the college, RCP North, on a £27.5 million rental contract for a half-share of the Spine on a 25-year lease from 2020. Dacre became chair of the Senior Physicians Society within the RCP in 2019. She chaired the "Mend the Gap" independent review on gender pay gaps in doctors in England which was commissioned by then Health Secretary Jeremy Hunt in 2017 and led by Professor Carol Woodhams. The review, published in 2020, found a gender pay gap of 18.9% (adjusted for contracted hours) in hospital and community doctors. The differences could be mainly explained by relative hours worked, seniority, and additional payments such as clinical excellence awards. It recommended reviewing pay-setting arrangements and the payment mechanism for clinical excellence awards, and promoting flexible working. Dacre has been the chair of the Health and Social Care Select Committee's expert panel since August 2020. She has also been the chair of the Health and Social Care Honours committee which is responsible for reviewing nominations for government honours since 2022. Dacre was appointed in March 2026 as the chair of the implementation group of the government's Medical Education and Training Review.

Dacre became the president of the Medical Protection Society in 2018 and the president of the Medical Women's Federation in 2025. She hosted the Medical Women Talking podcast between 2023 and 2024 which highlighted leading female doctors.

== Accolades and honours ==
She was ranked by the Health Service Journal as the 46th most influential person in the English NHS in 2015. Dacre is an honorary fellow of the Royal College of General Practitioners, Royal Australasian College of Physicians, Faculty of Public Health, Faculty of Forensic and Legal Medicine, Royal College of Physicians of Ireland, and West African College of Physicians. She is a fellow of the American College of Physicians and College of Physicians & Surgeons of Mumbai. In the 2018 Birthday Honours, Dacre was appointed a Dame Commander of the Order of the British Empire (DBE) for services to medicine and medical education. She is an emeritus professor of medical education at UCL.

== Personal life ==
She married Nigel Dacre in 1979 and they have two daughters and one son. He is a media executive and the younger brother of journalist Paul Dacre, former editor of The Daily Mail. She speaks fluent French.

Academic offices
Preceded by Sir Richard Thompson	President of the Royal College of Physicians; 2014–2018	Succeeded by Andrew Goddard
Non-profit organization positions
Preceded by Baroness Hollins	President of the Royal Medical Benevolent Fund; 2024-	Succeeded by Incumbent
