= Andrew Goddard =

British doctor

Sir Andrew Goddard

President of the Royal College of Physicians of London
- In office September 2018 – September 2022
- Preceded by: Dame Jane Dacre
- Succeeded by: Sarah Clarke

Personal details
- Born: 8 November 1967 (age 58) Plymouth, Devon, England
- Education: St John's College, Cambridge

Sir Andrew Francis Goddard FRCP (born 8 November 1967) is a British consultant gastroenterologist. He was the president of the Royal College of Physicians of London from 2018 to 2022. His clinical interests include inflammatory bowel disease, bowel cancer screening, iron deficiency anaemia, and Barrett's oesophagus.

== Biography ==
Goddard was born on 8 November 1967 in Plymouth, Devon, England. He was educated at the City of London Freemen's School, a private school in Ashtead, Surrey. Goddard studied medicine at St John's College, Cambridge, graduating with a Bachelor of Arts (BA) degree in 1988, a Bachelor of Surgery (BChir) degree in 1990 and a Bachelor of Medicine (MB) degree in 1991. He undertook house officer rotations at Addenbrooke's Hospital in Cambridge before becoming a research fellow at the University of Nottingham in 1994. He was awarded a Doctor of Medicine (MD) degree by the University of Cambridge in 1997. His MD involved research into the treatment of Helicobacter pylori, and his thesis was titled "Factors influencing antibiotic transfer across the gastric mucosa". Goddard became a consultant gastroenterologist at the Royal Derby Hospital in 2002.

He became a Fellow of the Royal College of Physicians (FRCP) in 2005. Goddard was the RCP Registrar from 2014 to 2018, the head of the RCP's Medical Workforce Unit between 2008 and 2013, and the chair of the New Consultants Committee between 2005 and 2007. In 2018 he was elected to succeed Jane Dacre as college president. During his tenure, he oversaw the establishment of RCP North, a new northern headquarters for the college based in Liverpool. This included signing a £27.5 million rental contract for a 25-year lease from 2020 of a half-share of the Spire building. He was knighted in the 2022 Birthday Honours for services to health and social care. His citation highlighted his key achievements as the annual workforce census of physicians, the establishment of the Faculty of Physician Associates, and support for wellbeing of doctors. He ended his term in September 2022 and was succeeded by cardiologist Sarah Clarke: geriatrician David Oliver had won the April election to succeed Goddard but chose to withdraw from the presidency in July for personal reasons.

Academic offices
Preceded by Jane Dacre	President of the Royal College of Physicians; 2018–2022	Succeeded by Sarah Clarke
