= Richard Thompson (physician) =

British physician (born 1940)

Sir Richard Thompson
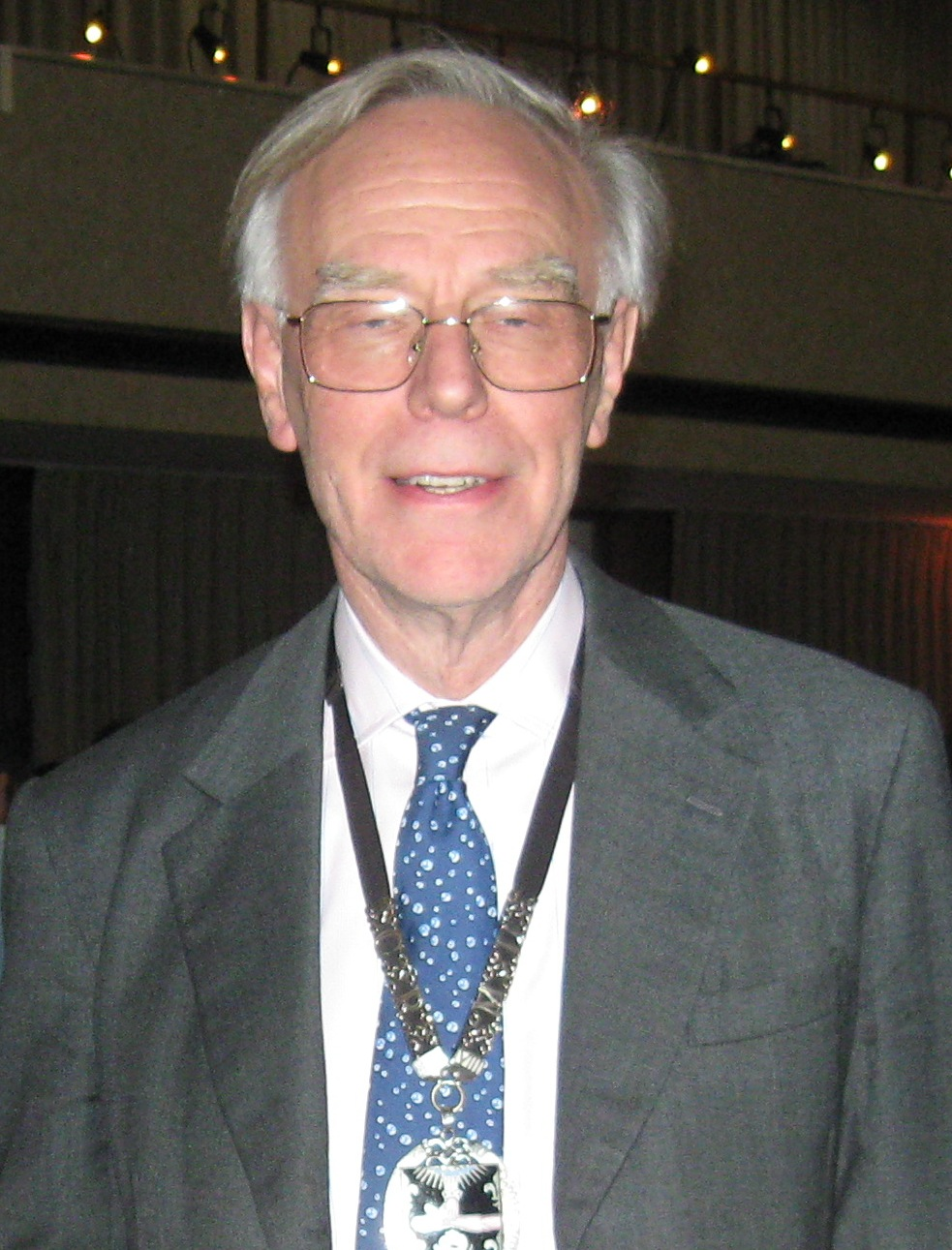
- Born: Richard Paul Hepworth Thompson; 14 April 1940 (age 86)
- Scientific career
- Fields: Medicine

Sir Richard Paul Hepworth Thompson, KCVO (born 14 April 1940) is a British physician and past president of the Royal College of Physicians in London.

== Biography ==
Thompson studied medicine at Oxford University and St Thomas' Hospital, and specialised in gastroenterology. He conducted research with Prof Roger Williams, and at the Mayo Clinic. He was appointed consultant at St Thomas' from 1972 until his retirement in 2005. He continued to conduct research in nutritional gastroenterology. From 1982 until 2005 he was also attached to King Edward VII's Hospital Sister Agnes. He was a member of the Medical Household of Elizabeth II, and head from 1993 until 2005. He received a knighthood in 2003, when he became KCVO.

From 2003 until 2010 he acted as treasurer to the Royal College of Physicians, and in 2010 was elected to succeed Ian Gilmore as president (PRCP). He was re-elected in 2013. In 2014 Professor Jane Dacre was elected as his successor.

Academic offices
Preceded by Sir Ian Gilmore	President of the Royal College of Physicians; 2010–14	Succeeded by Jane Dacre
