= George Ent =

English scientist (1604 - 1689)

Sir George Ent
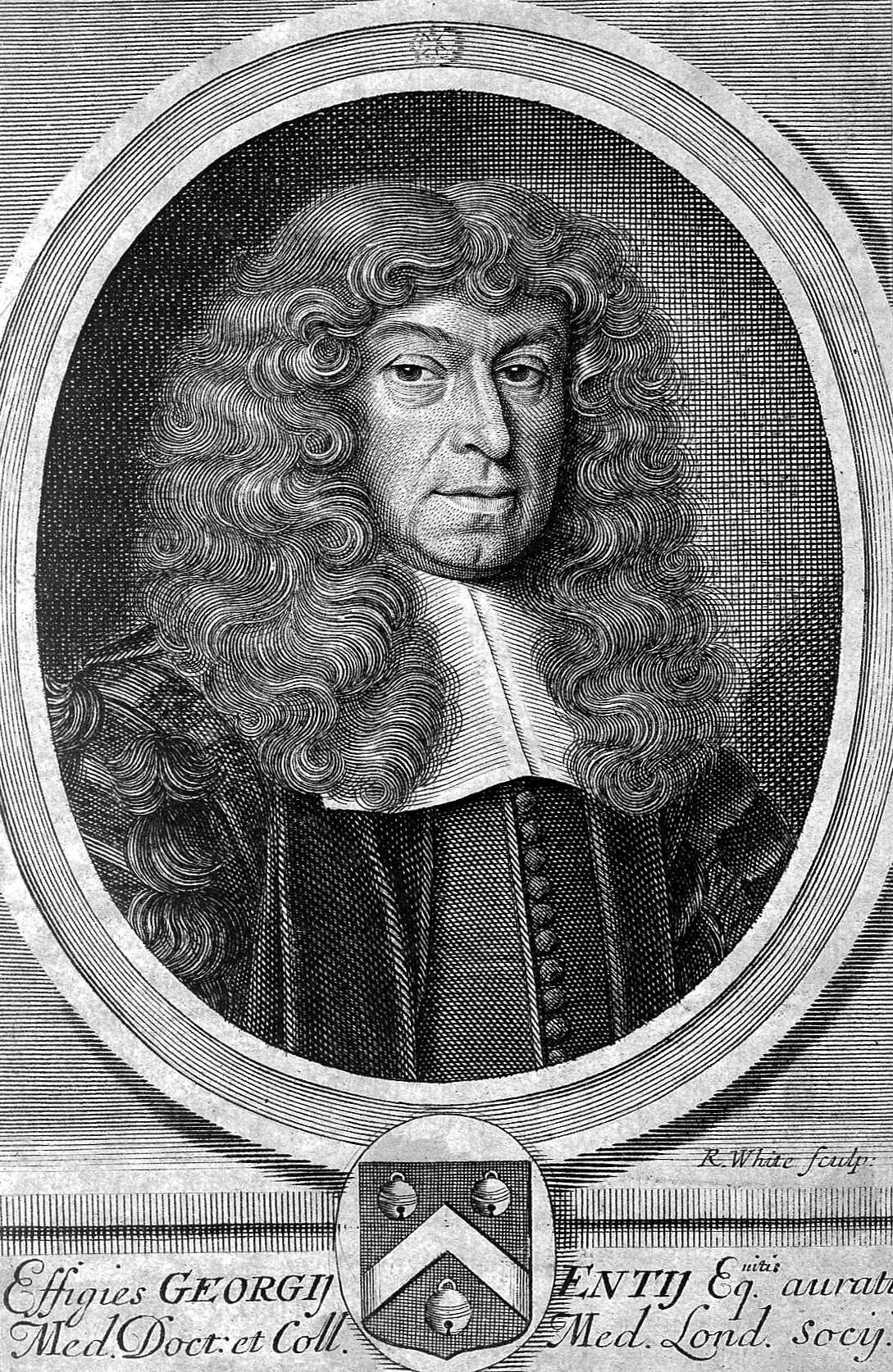
- Born: 6 November 1604; Sandwich, Kent, England
- Died: 13 October 1689 (aged 84); St Giles, London, England
- Education: Sidney Sussex College, Cambridge, University of Padua

George Ent (6 November 1604 – 13 October 1689) was an English scientist in the seventeenth century.

== Biography ==
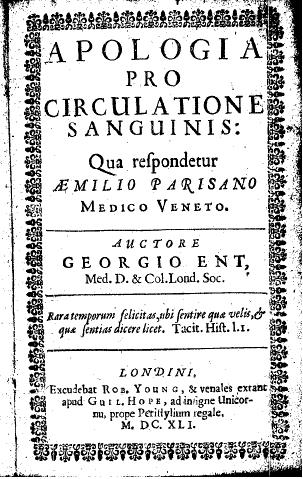
Title Page of Ent's Apologia

Ent was born on 6 November 1604 in Sandwich, Kent. He was the son of a Belgian immigrant, Josias Ent (sometimes called John Ent) and his wife Judith; The Ent (or Ente) family of Sandwich came from Newchurch, in the county of Flanders, to avoid religious persecution. George Ent's father died in July 1629, his mother in 1650,

As a boy, Ent went to school in Wallachia and Rotterdam, but attended college in England. He left for college in April 1624, and received his BA from Sidney Sussex College, Cambridge in 1627 and his MA four years later. Following his graduation from Sidney, he spent five years at the University of Padua, earning his MD in 1636.

On 25 June 1639, Sir George Ent became a fellow of the Royal College of Physicians and remained a fellow for the duration of his life. In addition, he served as a censor from 1645 to 1669 (with gaps in service in 1650, 1652, and 1658), a Registrar from 1655 to 1670, and Consiliarius from 1667 to 1669 and 1676 to 1686. He was elected President of the Royal College of Physicians in 1670 and held the position for five years. He also served on 17 August 1682 and 28 May 1684. Ent was also elected to the Royal Society as an Original Fellow on 22 April 1663.

On 10 October 1646, Ent married Sarah, the daughter of a former president of the Royal College, Dr. Othowell Meverell.

Ent was also known as an author, a scholar, and an anatomist. He was widely reputed to be exceptionally eloquent, particularly in Latin. He wrote a number of books, the most prominent of which is probably his Apologia, the first book Ent ever published. In addition, he both studied and gave lectures on anatomy. In 1665, his anatomy lectures at the Royal College of Physicians were observed by King Charles II, who knighted him in April of the same year. This remains the only instance in which a man was actually knighted inside the Royal College.

Although born twenty-six years after him, Ent was a close friend of William Harvey, a man known best for his discovery of the circulation of blood. Ent met Harvey in Venice, shortly after his graduation from Padua. His Apologia was a defense of Harvey's theory of circulation, and Ent is credited with convincing Harvey to release his de Generatione Animalium, which was actually edited and published by Ent.

Ent is also known for his correspondence with Cassiano dal Pozzo, who sent Ent fossilized wood specimens, including a tabletop made of petrified wood. Ent showed them to the Royal Society, where they led to increased interest in the origin of fossils.

Ent died in his house in St Giles-in-the-Fields on 13 October 1689 at the age of 84.

== Works and Theories ==
George Ent's significance lies mainly in his contributions to the works of others, particularly his critiques. He is known as one of the closest friends and first defenders of William Harvey, and he is considered to be one of Harvey's successors in the study of anatomy. Ent's best known theories build on Harvey's work, while the rest of Ent's work spans a wide spectrum of knowledge.

=== Apologia pro circulatione sanguinis ===
Translation: Defense on Behalf of the Circulation of the Blood.

Written in 1641, the Apologia pro circulatione sanguinis, Ent's most significant work on anatomy, defends the theories of William Harvey’s book de Motu Cordis (On the Circulation of the Blood), directly responding to the criticism of Emilius Parisianus. This book is significant both on the merits of Ent's own anatomical theories and because it offered one of the first in-depth defenses of Harvey’s work.

In the Apologia, Ent elaborates on Harvey’s theories on circulation, suggesting that a “nutritive fluid” nourishes the body by passing through the nerves. Ent draws on John Mayow’s theories on innate heat and respiration in his discussion of the nervous system. In addition to Harvey's work, Ent references both ancient and contemporary sources, particularly mentioning writers discussing topics now considered occult, whom Harvey dismissed.

=== Sive animadversiones in Malachias Thrustoni ===
Translation: Or Observations against Malachi Thruston.

The Sive animadversiones in Malachias Thrustoni contains Ent's analysis of Malachi Thruston’s theories on respiration. While containing a reasonable critique, the original theories Ent puts forth in this work do not go beyond those expressed in his Apologia, making this work less significant than the Apologia as an original expression.

=== Lectures on Anatomy ===
Ent gave several lectures on anatomy at the Royal College of Physicians in 1665. He is known for being one of only two lecturers to have left his lecture notes in English. After a lecture in April, which the King attended, Ent received a knighthood.

=== Other works ===
Mantissa anatomica combines of three of Ent's studies on anatomy – Lophius, Galeus, and Rana. He assembled these as part of an intended broad study of anatomy in the 1650s that never further materialized.

From 1637–1655, Ent corresponded with Cassiano dal Pozzo concerning fossil wood.

Published in 1687, near the end of Ent’s lifetime, the Opera Omnia Medico-Physica (All Medical-Physical Works) contains a collection of Ent’s works.

Ent’s nonscientific works include a range of topics. The Grounds of Unity in Religion comments on the relationship of the English government and the Church of England, discussing the position of people of different faiths with the political and religious framework. The Manner of Hatching Chicken at Cairo, on which he collaborated with John Graves, describes a method of using heat from ovens to force eggs to hatch.
