= Bartlot =

Bartlot is a surname. Notable people with the surname include:

- Richard Bartlot (1471–1557), English physician
- Barttelot baronets, sometimes written Bartlot
