= Richard Palmer (physician) =

English physician

- Died: 1625
- Occupation: Physician

Richard Palmer (died 1625) was an English physician.

== Biography ==
Palmer was a native of London. He entered Christ's College, Cambridge, and there graduated B.A. in 1579. He migrated to Peterhouse, and there became M.A. in 1583. He received a license to practise in London from the Royal College of Physicians 9 April 1593, and was elected a fellow in February 1597. He was nine times censor between 1599 and 1619, was treasurer from 1621 to 1624, and president in 1620. On 5 November 1612 he attended with Dr. John Giffard at the bedside of Henry, prince of Wales. Several long consultations were held with Sir Theodore Mayernem Dr. John Hammond, Dr. Henry Atkins and Dr. William Butler, and in the presence of Sir Thomas Challoner and Sir David Murray in October 1612, and the result was that, on the opinion of the majority, a prescription known as diascordium was given to the prince, with no good effect, for he died next day. Palmer was present at the post-mortem examination, and in the original report his signature stands fourth of the six physicians. In the report, as printed by Mayerne, his name is last. He died early in 1625.
