= Samuel Foxe =

English diarist and politician

Samuel Foxe (1560–1630), was an English diarist and politician. He was a Member of the Parliament of England for Midhurst in 1589 and for Knaresborough in 1593.

== Information ==
Foxe was the eldest son of John Foxe, the martyrologist. He was born at Norwich on 31 December 1560, and admitted into Merchant Taylors' School, London, on 20 October 1572. In 1574 he went to Oxford, where he was elected demy of Magdalen College. In 1576 he left for France without the permission of his tutors or the knowledge of his father. He was, however, readmitted to the college, although he is said to have acquired a fondness for dress, which displeased his father. In 1579 he was elected probationer, and in 1580 fellow of his college.

In 1581 he was expelled on religious grounds. He seems to have quarrelled with some of his colleagues who adopted the more extreme forms of puritanism. His father temperately pleaded for his restoration, and wrote to a bishop, probably Horn of Winchester, soliciting his help in the matter. Meanwhile, Samuel spent more than three years in foreign travel, visiting the universities of Leipzig, Padua, and Basle. He returned to England in 1585, and was restored to his fellowship.

His father gave him a lease of Shipton, Wiltshire, attached to the prebend which the elder Foxe held in Salisbury Cathedral. In 1587 he was admitted into the service of Sir Thomas Heneage of Copt Hall, Essex, and became custodian of Havering-atte-Bower and clerk of Epping. On 15 April 1589 he married Anne Leveson, suspected daughter of Sir Thomas Leveson and sister to Sir John Leveson. He was chosen burgess for the university of Oxford in 1590. The parliament in which he sat was of very brief duration, but it passed—probably with Foxe's aid—a valuable and much needed act directed against abuses in the election to fellowships, scholarships, and similar positions. About 1594 he settled at Warlies, near Waltham Abbey, and died there in January 1629–30. He was buried at Waltham Abbey 16 Jan. His will was dated 22 June 1629.

== Written works ==
The Latin treatise on the Apocalypse, dedicated by him to Archbishop Whitgift, was written by his father. The 'Life' of his father, prefixed to the second volume of the 'Actes and Monuments' in the edition of 1641, has been repeatedly ascribed to him. But internal evidence is much opposed to this theory of authorship. His 'Diary,' very brief and extending over only a portion of his life, will be found in the appendix to Strype's 'Annals.' The original is in British Library Lansdowne 679. A letter to his brother Simeon is in British Library Harley MS 416, at f. 222, and a continuation of his travels in Lansdowne MS 679. The latter pieces are printed in William Winters' Biographical Notes on John Foxe the Martyrologist, 1876.

== Family ==
By his wife Anne, who was buried by her husband 18 May 1630, Foxe had three sons, Thomas, John, and Robert. Thomas Foxe, M.D. (1591–1662), born at Havering Palace 14 February 1591; matriculated from Magdalen Hall, Oxford, 19 June 1607; was demy of Magdalen College 1608–13, and fellow 1613–30, proceeding B.A. 1611 and M.A. 1614. He was bursar of his college in 1622, and junior proctor of the university 1620–1. He afterwards studied medicine, proceeding M.D. at Oxford, and was a candidate of the London College of Physicians 25 June 1623. A letter describing Ben Jonson's reception at Oxford, written by Thomas Foxe to his father, is preserved in Harley MS 416, at f. 226, and has been printed by William Winters.

On 8 May 1634 James Hay, Earl of Carlisle, applied to him for a loan of £500. He seems to have acquired much property, and to have been friendly with men eminent in literature and society. He died at Warlies 20 November 1662, and was buried in Waltham Abbey 26 November. He married Anne, daughter of Richard Honeywood of Charing, Kent, and Marleshall, Essex, and granddaughter of Mrs. Mary Honeywood, the pious friend of his grandfather, the martyrologist. By her he left a daughter Alice, who married Sir Richard Willys, baronet. Robert, Samuel's youngest son, was a captain in the navy, and died in 1646. He wrote to his elder brother an interesting letter descriptive of the trial of the Earl and Countess of Somerset.
