= Richard Bartlett (disambiguation) =

Richard Bartlett (1922–1994) was an American director and producer.

Richard Bartlett may also refer to:

- Ricky Bartlett (cricketer) (born 1966), English cricketer
- Richard J. Bartlett (1926–2015), American jurist

== See also ==
- Richard Bartlot (1471–1557), English physician
- Richard Bartlett Schroder (born 1970)
