= Charles Dodds =

British biochemist

Sir Charles Dodds Bt MVO FRS FRSE FRCP
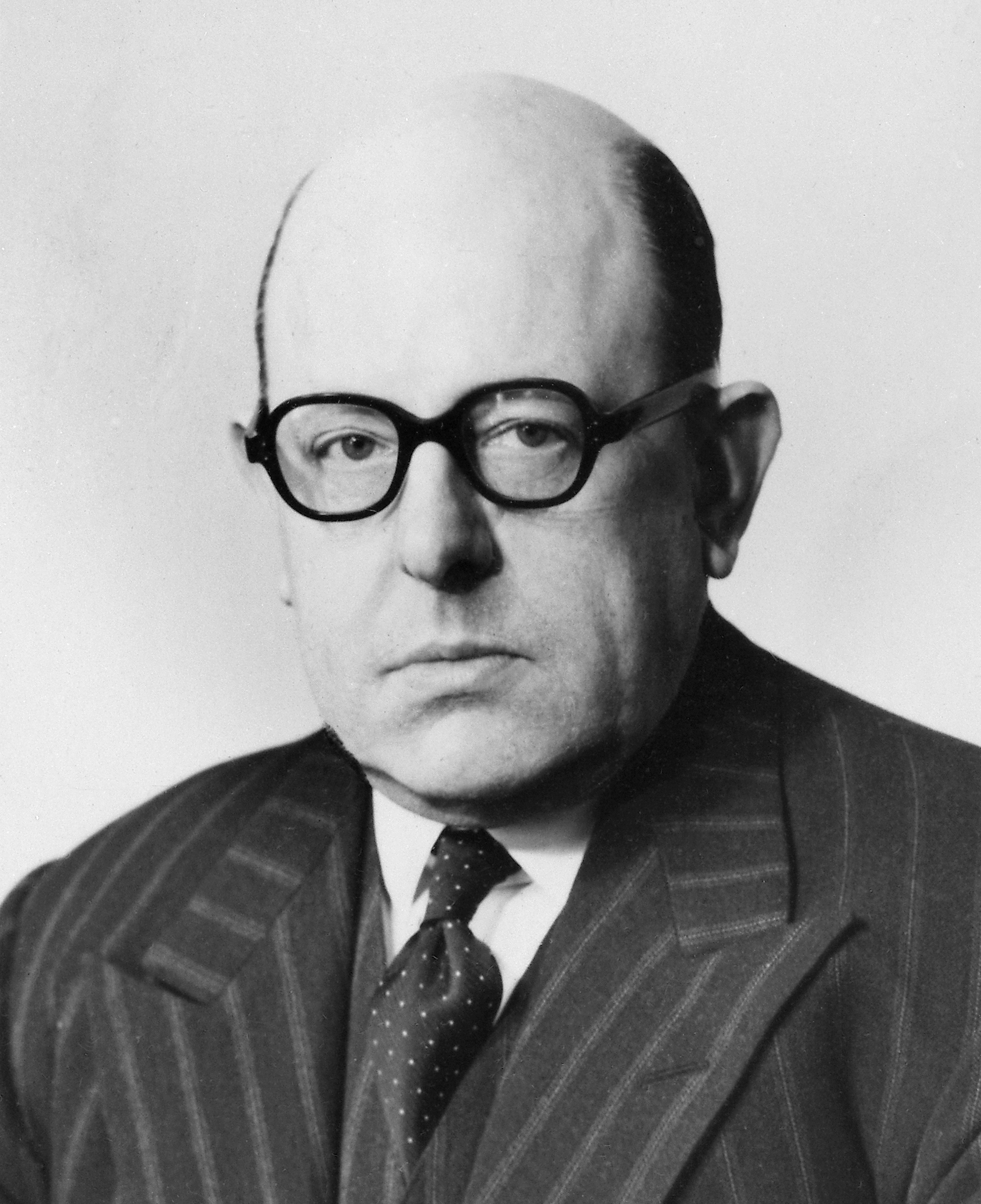
- Born: Edward Charles Dodds; 13 October 1899
- Died: 16 December 1973 (aged 74)
- Education: Middlesex Hospital
- Awards: Cameron Prize for Therapeutics of the University of Edinburgh (1940); Fellow of the Royal Society (1942)

Sir Edward Charles Dodds, 1st Baronet (13 October 1899 – 16 December 1973) was a British biochemist.

== Personal life ==
He was born in Liverpool in 1899, the only child of Ralph Edward Dodds, a shoe retailer, and Jane (née Pack) Dodds. The family shortly moved to Leeds, then to Darlington and then to Chesham, Bucks, where he attended Harrow County School. From there he entered the Middlesex Hospital Medical School in London in 1916, spent one year in the army in 1917, and qualified MRCS and LRCP in 1921.

He died at Sussex Square in Paddington, London on 16 December 1973.

== Career ==
In 1924 he was appointed to the new Chair of Biochemistry at the University of London which was started in the Bland Sutton Institute of Pathology at the Middlesex. Three years later, he was appointed Director of the recently completed Courtauld Institute of Biochemistry and retained these two appointments until his retirement forty years later. His scientific interests were wide and varied; he had a continuing interest in the problem of cancer and of research into its causation, and was an authority on food and diet and also devoted time and energy to the problems of rheumatism. He provided facilities and gave advice and encouragement to younger colleagues in such work as immunopathology, steroid chemistry, cytochemistry and the work which led to the discovery of Aldosterone.

== Awards and honours ==
He was appointed a Member (fourth class) of the Royal Victorian Order in the 1929 Birthday Honours.

In 1940, Dodds received the Cameron Prize for Therapeutics of the University of Edinburgh. The next year, 1941, he was elected a Fellow of the Royal Society of Edinburgh. His proposers were Francis Albert Eley Crew, Alan William Greenwood, James Kendall and Guy Frederic Marrian.

In 1942 he was elected to Fellowship of the Royal Society and subsequently served as Vice-President. He served the Royal College of Physicians for some years as Harveian Librarian and in 1962 was elected President, the first to hold the office who was laboratory based and not engaged in clinical practice. During his term of office as President he was invested as a knight into the Order of the Hospital of St. John of Jerusalem (KStJ).

He was knighted in 1954, and created 1st Baronet Dodds of West Chiltington in the County of Sussex on 10 February 1964.

== Publications ==
He co-authored a number of books such as The Laboratory in Surgical practice, Chemical and Physiological Properties of Medicine and Recent Advances in British Medicine.

== Family ==
In 1923 he married Constance Elizabeth Jordan (d. 1969) of Darlington. They had one son, Sir Ralph Jordan Dodds, who succeeded to the baronetcy on Charles' death in 1973.

Academic offices
| Preceded by Sir Robert Platt, Bt | President of the Royal College of Physicians; 1962–1966 | Succeeded by Max Rosenheim |
Baronetage of the United Kingdom
| New creation | Baronet (of West Chiltington); 1964–1973 | Succeeded by Ralph Dodds |
