= Dodds baronets =

Extinct baronetcy in the Baronetage of the United Kingdom

The Dodds Baronetcy, of West Chiltington in the County of Sussex, is a title in the Baronetage of the United Kingdom. It was created on 10 February 1964 for Charles Dodds, President of the Royal College of Physicians from 1962 to 1966. The baronetcy became extinct on the death of his son, the second baronet, in 2015.

== Dodds baronets, of West Chiltington (1964) ==
- Sir (Edward) Charles Dodds, 1st Baronet (1899–1973)
- Sir Ralph Jordan Dodds, 2nd Baronet (1928–2015)

Coat of arms of Dodds baronets

Crest
A demi woman affronty Proper vested Azure holding an open book Proper inscribed with the chemical formula for stolboestrol Sable.
Escutcheon
Azure issuant from a chief Argent and out of a sunburst a dexter hand Proper between two crabs' heasd downward Argent each transfixed by a sword Or on the chief a steer's head and caboshed Sable armed Gold between two capons Proper.
Motto
Deeds Not Thoughts
