= Alcohol Health Alliance UK =

Coalition in the United Kingdom

- Alcohol Health Alliance UK (AHA)
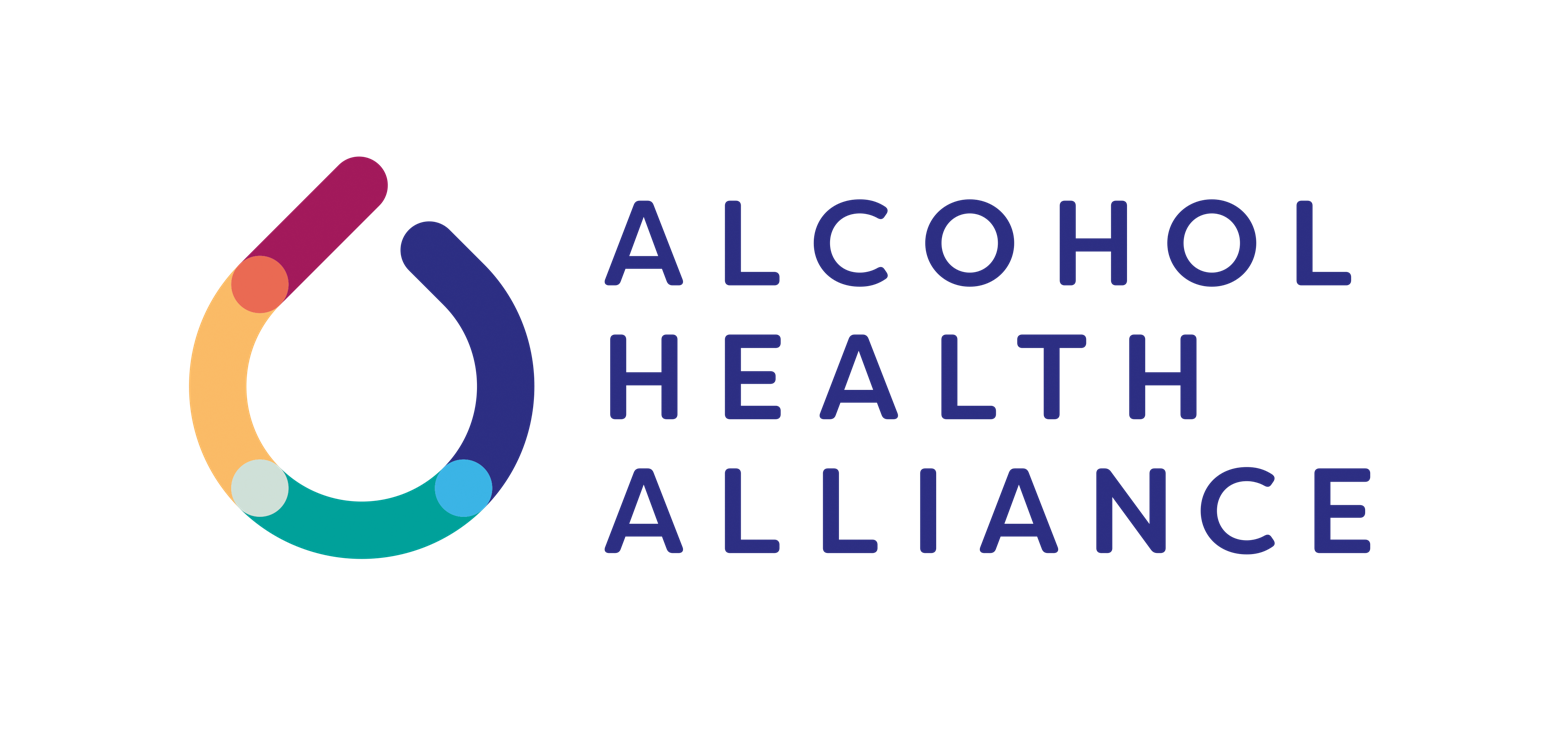
- Formation: 2007
- Purpose: To highlight the rising levels of alcohol-related harm in the UK; To propose evidence-based solutions to reduce the harm caused by alcohol; To influence decision-makers to take positive action to address alcohol harm
- Website: https://ahauk.org/

The Alcohol Health Alliance UK (AHA) is a coalition of more than 60 non-governmental organisations which work together to promote evidence-based policies to reduce the harm caused by alcohol.

Professor Sir Ian Gilmore, a professor of hepatology at the University of Liverpool and the Royal College of Physician's Special Advisor on Alcohol has chaired the Alliance since it was established in November 2007.

== Policy ==
The AHA promotes policies for reducing the harm caused by alcohol as set out in Health First: An evidence-based alcohol strategy for the UK.

The top policy recommendations to tackle alcohol harm from Health First are:

- A minimum price of at least 50p per unit of alcohol should be introduced for all alcohol sales, together with a mechanism to regularly review and revise this price.
- At least one third of every alcohol product label should be given over to an evidence-based health warning specified by an independent regulatory body.
- The sale of alcohol in shops should be restricted to specific times of the day and designated areas. No alcohol promotion should occur outside these areas.
- The tax on every alcohol product should be proportionate to the volume of alcohol it contains. In order to incentivise the development and sale of lower strength products, the rate of taxation should increase with product strength.
- Licensing legislation should be comprehensively reviewed. Licensing authorities must be empowered to tackle alcohol-related harm by controlling the total availability of alcohol in their jurisdiction.
- All alcohol advertising and sponsorship should be prohibited. In the short term, alcohol advertising should only be permitted in newspapers and other adult press. Its content should be limited to factual information about brand, provenance and product strength.
- An independent body should be established to regulate alcohol promotion, including product and packaging design, in the interests of public health and community safety.
- The legal limit for blood alcohol concentration for drivers should be reduced to 50 mg/100ml.
- All health and social care professionals should be trained to routinely provide early identification and brief alcohol advice to their clients.
- People who need support for alcohol problems should be routinely referred to specialist alcohol services for comprehensive assessment and appropriate treatment.

== Members ==
The following organisations are members of the Alcohol Health Alliance:

1. Academy of Medical Royal Colleges
2. Action on Addiction
3. Action on Sugar
4. Addiction Professionals
5. alcoHELP
6. Alcohol Action Ireland
7. Alcohol Change UK
8. Alcohol Focus Scotland
9. Alcohol Forum Ireland
10. Aquarius
11. Association of Anaesthetists
12. Association of Directors of Public Health
13. BAC-IN CIC
14. Balance North East
15. British Association for the Study of the Liver
16. British Liver Trust
17. British Medical Association
18. British Society of Gastroenterology
19. Cancer Research UK
20. Centre for Mental Health
21. Change, Grow, Live
22. Changing Lives
23. Doctors in Unite
24. Druglink
25. Faculty of Dental Surgery
26. Faculty of Occupational Medicine
27. Faculty of Public Health
28. Forward Trust
29. Foundation for Liver Research
30. Healthier and Fairer Futures
31. Humankind
32. Institute of Alcohol Studies
33. Look Around
34. Medical Council on Alcohol
35. Men's Health Forum
36. Nacoa
37. National Addiction Centre
38. National Organisation for Foetal Alcohol Syndrome UK
39. Northern Ireland Alcohol and Drug Alliance
40. Public Health Action
41. Royal College of Anaesthetists
42. Royal College of Emergency Medicine
43. Royal College of General Practitioners
44. Royal College of Midwives
45. Royal College of Nursing
46. Royal College of Physicians of Edinburgh
47. Royal College of Physicians London
48. Royal College of Physicians and Surgeons, Glasgow
49. Royal College of Psychiatrists
50. Royal College of Surgeons of Edinburgh
51. Royal College of Surgeons of England
52. Royal Society for Public Health
53. Scottish Families Affected by Alcohol and Drugs
54. SHAAP (Scottish Health Action on Alcohol Problems)
55. Share Shrewsbury
56. Sikh Recovery Network
57. SPECTRUM Research Consortium
58. Spinal Injuries Association
59. Tower Hamlets GP Care Group CIC
60. Turning Point
61. Violence and Society Research Group
62. We Are With You
63. Welsh Association for Gastroenterology and Endoscopy (WAGE)
64. World Cancer Research Fund
65. Yorkshire and Humber Public Health Network
