= Max Rosenheim =

British physician and academic

The Right Honourable The Lord Rosenheim
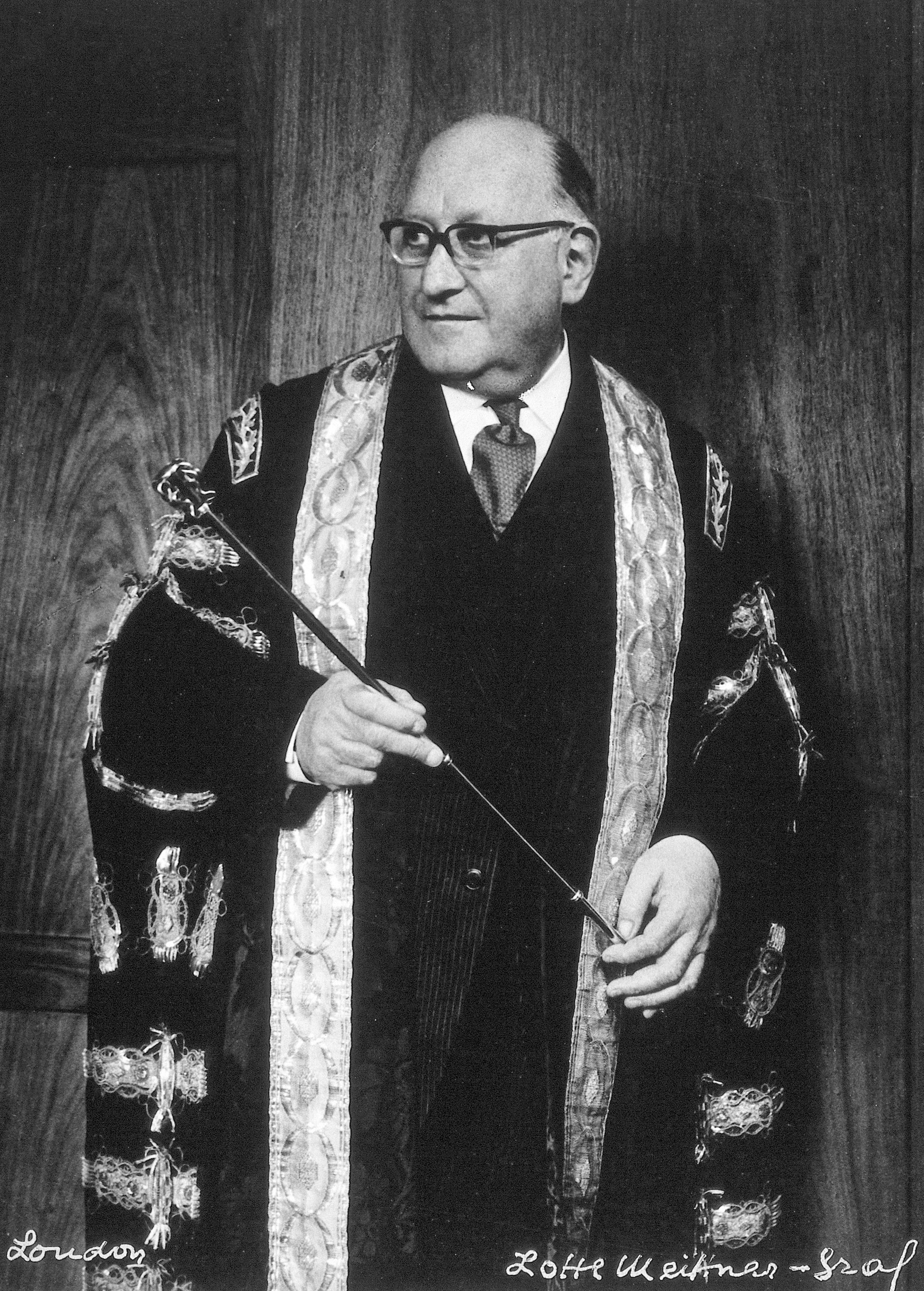
- Born: Max Leonard Rosenheim; 15 March 1908
- Died: 2 December 1972 (aged 64)
- Education: St. John's College, Cambridge
- Awards: Fellow of the Royal Society

Max Leonard Rosenheim, Baron Rosenheim, KBE, PRCP, FRS (15 March 1908 – 2 December 1972) was a British physician and academic.

== Early life and education ==
Max Leonard Rosenheim was born in London to Ludwig Rosenheim, a stockbroker, whose father was from Würzburg, Germany, and Martha Reichenbach, whose father was from St. Gall, Switzerland. His parents were non-practising Jews and members of the Ethical Society. Rosenheim had one sister, Adele Van Noorden (née Rosenheim) and one brother, Major Charles Leslie Rosenheim 25 August 1912 – 12 February 1945.

Rosenheim was educated at Shrewsbury School, St John's College, Cambridge and University College Hospital (UCH) Medical School.

== Career ==
In 1938, Rosenheim was awarded the Bilton Pollard Travelling Fellowship and worked as research assistant for Dr Fuller Albright at the Massachusetts General Hospital.

Rosenheim joined the Royal Army Medical Corps in 1941 and served in the Middle East and Italy, leaving the Army as a brigadier. From 1945 to 1946, Rosenheim was consultant physician to the Allied Land Forces in South East Asia.

From 1949 and for the next 21 years, Rosenheim was Professor of Medicine at UCH, resigning in 1960 but retaining his links with UCH, acting as a part-time physician. His own particular medical interests were renal disease and hypertension, and he was among the first in his profession to convince his fellows that hypertension could be treated.

== Awards and honours ==
In the Royal College of Physicians, Rosenheim was elected a Member (MRCP) in 1934 and a Fellow (FRCP) in 1941; he delivered the Lumleian lecture at the College in 1963 entitled Problems of Chronic Pyelonephritis. In 1966, he was elected President of the Royal College of Physicians (PRCP), a position he held until his death in 1972. In 1972, a few months before he died, he was elected under Statute 12 a Fellow of the Royal Society (FRS).

Rosenheim was appointed a Commander of the Order of the British Empire (CBE) in the 1955 Birthday Honours, he was promoted to Knight Commander (KBE) in the 1967 New Year Honours. Sir Max was created a life peer on 31 July 1970 taking the title Baron Rosenheim, of the London Borough of Camden.

Coat of arms of Max Rosenheim

Crest
Perched on a rose branch leaved with two roses Gules barbed and seeded a Jamaican doctor bird (Trochilus Polytmus) all Proper.
Escutcheon
Or a pale Sable per chevron flory at the point counterchanged three roses Gules barbed and seeded Proper.
Supporters
Dexter an eagle and sinister a Kingfisher both Proper.

Academic offices
Preceded by Sir Edward Charles Dodds, Bt	President of the Royal College of Physicians; 1966–1971	Succeeded by Cyril Clarke
