= William Munk =

British doctor and medical historian

William Munk, FRCP (September 1816 – 20 December 1898) was an English physician, now remembered for his work as a medical historian and "Munk's Roll", a biographical reference work on the Royal College of Physicians.

== Life ==
The eldest son of William Munk, an ironmonger, and his wife Jane Kenward, he was born on 24 September 1816 at Battle, Sussex, and after education at University College London, graduated M.D. at the Leiden University in 1837. He began practice in London in September 1837, and in 1844 he became a licentiate of the Royal College of Physicians, and in 1854 a fellow. In 1857 he was elected the Harveian Librarian of the college, and held office till his death.

He became a Roman Catholic in 1842, and from 1857 to 1865 was the medical adviser of Nicholas Wiseman, Cardinal Archbishop of Westminster. He was for many years an active member of the committee of the London Library.

He was elected physician to the Smallpox Hospital in February 1853, and held office there for forty years. When Prince Arthur had smallpox at Greenwich in October 1867 he was called in consultation. He long resided at 40 Finsbury Square, London, enjoyed a considerable practice, and died there on 20 December 1898. He was of short stature.

== Works ==
In 1857 he published 'Memoirs of the Life and Writings of J. A. Paris, M.D.', on John Ayrton Paris, and in 1861 'The Roll of the Royal College of Physicians of London,' in two volumes. A second edition of this work appeared in 1878 in three volumes; it is a major work of reference on the physicians of England, refers to the manuscript records of the College of Physicians, and contains information from other sources.

In 1860 he published the first two volumes of The Roll of the Royal College of Physicians of London, and the third volume in 1878 as part of the second edition of the work. It is now commonly known as the Munk's Roll.

In 1884 he edited 'The Gold-headed Cane' of Dr. William MacMichael, in 1887 published 'Euthanasia, or Medical Treatment in aid of an Easy Natural Death,' and in 1895 'The Life of Sir Henry Halford, Bart., M.D.' The College of Physicians voted him one hundred guineas in consideration of this work. He also published some 'Notæ Harveianæ' in the 'St. Bartholomew's Hospital Reports' (vol. xxii.); and in 1885 'Marvodia,' a genealogical account of the Marwoods, a Devonshire family; and wrote several essays on medical subjects in The Lancet.

== Family ==
He married, 30 April 1849, Emma, eighteenth child of John Luke of Exeter, and left two sons and three daughters.
