= The British Liver Trust =

Charity with focus on liver health

- Founder: Dame Sheila Sherlock
- Purpose: To provide help and support relating to the health of the liver
- Headquarters: Winchester
- Website: http://www.britishlivertrust.org.uk/

The British Liver Trust is a charitable organisation in the United Kingdom which has a focus on the health of the liver. Based in Winchester, the Trust has over 20 employed members of staff who are supplemented by voluntary workers.

The British Liver Trust has produced several campaigns on the liver, including "Love Your Liver" which is a national awareness campaign devoted to liver health awareness and giving people the key steps needed to keep their livers healthy.

The trust also has links to support groups for people affected by liver conditions, health professionals and research and publications. The trust's work reaches over a million people a year.

== Mission ==
The British Liver Trust is a charity dedicated to assisting anyone with liver disease in the United Kingdom. This is done by providing support to patients with liver disease, improving awareness, lobbying for improved services and funding research into the causes and treatments of liver disease.

== Activities ==
The Trust has a number of activities to aid in the fight against liver disease. These include services for patients, such as support groups. The trust assists in finding a local support group or setting one up. The trust's website also has a HealthUnlocked online liver support community. Leading liver specialists often review the trust's leaflets on liver diseases, ensuring they contain up-to-date, reliably sourced information. The trust has also produced two professional guides on viral hepatitis. Publications produced by the trust have received an endorsement from the British Association for the Study of the Liver (BASL). These methods of support can be accessed via the trust's information line.

The trust also has a focus in improving awareness of liver disease in order to educate the public about how to avoid it. This is often done by campaigns, for example the "Love Your Liver" campaign which is one of the Trust's current campaigns.

Research into liver disease is supported by the British Liver Trust through fundraising. The trust has also made many research awards in this field. The trust is a member of the Association of Medical Research Charities (AMRC). Aims of the research include improving and expanding methods of prevention, detection and screening for all types of liver disease, the improvement of liver treatment and the identification and addressing of medical and research needs in liver disease. The trust works with a number of medical professionals in awareness, treatment and research.

== Campaigns ==
The Trust runs several campaigns on a number of issues such as promotion of good liver health, effects of alcohol on the Liver, Liver transplants and Hepatitis. The aims of these campaigns are to make sure a patient's voice is heard, improvement of patient services, promote early awareness of liver disease and to raise awareness.

"Love Your Liver" is one of the trust's campaigns. It is a national liver health awareness campaign launched in 2012 designed to inform people about factors that can cause liver damage and how they can be avoided. The campaign's website contains information on these factors as well as an online health scanner designed to assess liver health risks and to provide some relevant advice. As part of the Love Your Liver campaign an app called Spruce has been developed which aims to help people regulate their alcohol intake by encouraging them to have three days off alcohol each week. Spruce is a free app and can be downloaded from the Apple store.

Other campaigns run by the British Liver Trust are the Liver Task Force which develops and implements actions that would have been part of the scrapped National Liver Strategy, the Alcohol Health Alliance which campaigns for a new alcohol strategy such as a 50p minimum price per unit of alcohol, and the NHS Atlas of Variation in Healthcare for People with Liver Disease which aims to improve services and reduce inequality for liver patients.

== Fundraising ==
British Liver Trust has been fundraising for over 30 years and aims to raise over £1,000,0000 a year to change lives by:

- increasing awareness of liver disease and its risk factors - providing information and support to those affected - working with healthcare professionals - campaigning for earlier detection and better treatment and working in partnership to drive up standards of care and encourage more research

== Patron ==
In November 2015, the blues musician Walter Trout became a patron of the British Liver Trust. Trout found out that he had liver disease in 2013. After spending five months in a liver ward, he received a liver transplant in 2014. By 2015, he had recovered and was able to go on tour in Europe. "I'm only still here because someone donated their liver," he said.
