= Simeon Fox =

Simeon Fox (or Foxe), M.D. (1568–20 April 1642) was an English physician, who became President of the College of Physicians.

== Life ==
Fox was the youngest son of John Foxe, and was born in the house of the Duke of Norfolk. He was educated at Eton College, and on 24 August 1583 was elected a scholar of King's College, Cambridge, where he proceeded B.A. in 1587, having become a fellow 24 August 1586. He graduated M.A. in 1591.

Bishop John Piers promised Fox a prebend, but he preferred to study medicine. After leaving college he resided for some time with Archbishop John Whitgift, then visited Italy, and took the degree of M.D. at the University of Padua. On Fox's return home he engaged in military service, and was with Sir John Norris and the Earl of Southampton in Ireland and the Netherlands. In the Low Countries he is said to have been taken prisoner and detained for a time at Dunkirk.

Fox reached London in 1603, and began to practise medicine, attaining prominence in his profession. He was admitted a candidate of the College of Physicians on 30 September 1605, and a fellow on 25 June 1608. He was censor in 1614, 1620, 1621, 1623, 1624, 1625, 1631, and 1632; registrar on 20 November 1627, on the death of Dr Matthew Gwinne; treasurer on 3 December 1629, on William Harvey's resignation of that office; anatomy reader, 1630; elect, 22 December 1630, in place of the late Thomas Moundeford; president from 1634 to 1640; consiliarius in 1641.

Fox died at the college house at Amen Corner, Paternoster Row, on 20 April 1642. In his will, dated 21 October 1641, proved by his nephew, Thomas Foxe, he described himself as of the parish of St Martin Ludgate, London, and desired to be buried St Paul's Cathedral, near to the monument of Thomas Linacre; bequeathing the sum of £20 to the cathedral. Fox was buried according to his directions on 24 April.

== Legacy ==
He also bequeathed to the college £40, to which his nephew added another £60. In 1656 the college, on the proposition of Baldwin Hamey, voted the erection of a marble bust to his memory in the Harveian Museum; the statue was destroyed in the Great Fire of London of 1666, as was his monument in St Paul's. His portrait in the college was one of two pictures rescued from the fire, but then disappeared.

He attended John Donne, Dean of St Paul's, and contributed liberally towards the erection of a monument to his memory. In British Library Harley MS 416 (ff. 203b, 210, 214) are three Latin letters of Fox, two of which are addressed to his father and brother Samuel respectively. The life of his father prefixed to the second volume of the 1641 edition of the Actes and Monuments, long attributed to his brother Samuel, has also been assigned, on weak grounds, to Simeon himself.
