= Ian Gilmore =

British hepatologist (born 1947)

Sir Ian Thomas Gilmore DL PRCP (born 1947) is a professor of hepatology and previous president of the Royal College of Physicians of London (PRCP).

He was educated at the Royal Grammar School, Newcastle, trained at Cambridge University and St Thomas' Hospital, qualifying in 1971 and subsequently specialising in gastroenterology, specifically liver disease.

Having spent time in the United States at the University of California, San Diego (1979–1980), as an MRC travelling fellow he assumed a consultant post at Royal Liverpool University Hospital. He was made honorary professor at the University of Liverpool in 1999.

In 2010 he was knighted in the Queen's Birthday Honours' in recognition of his outstanding contribution to Medicine. Sir Ian was chair of Liverpool Health Partners 2013-2017.

== Public statements ==
In 2001, he chaired a Royal College of Physicians working party that produced the report "Alcohol – can the NHS afford it?"

During his time as president of the College from 2006 to 2010 he made several public statements on alcohol misuse in the United Kingdom, and under his leadership the Royal College initiated the Alcohol Health Alliance UK in 2007. He was knighted in the 2010 Queen's Birthday Honours.

In August 2010, Sir Ian said that "making drugs such as heroin and cocaine legal would 'drastically' cut crime and addicts' health problems" in interviews with both newspapers and the BBC.

He resigned from his position with Public Health England when the agency refused to break their connection with Drinkaware in their Drink Free Days campaign in 2018.

Academic offices
Preceded by Dame Carol M. Black	President of the Royal College of Physicians; 2006–2010	Succeeded by Sir Richard Thompson
