= Thomas Gisborne (physician) =

British physician

Thomas Gisborne (died 1806) was President of the College of Physicians in 1791, 1794 and from 1796 to 1803.
