= William Wasey =

English physician

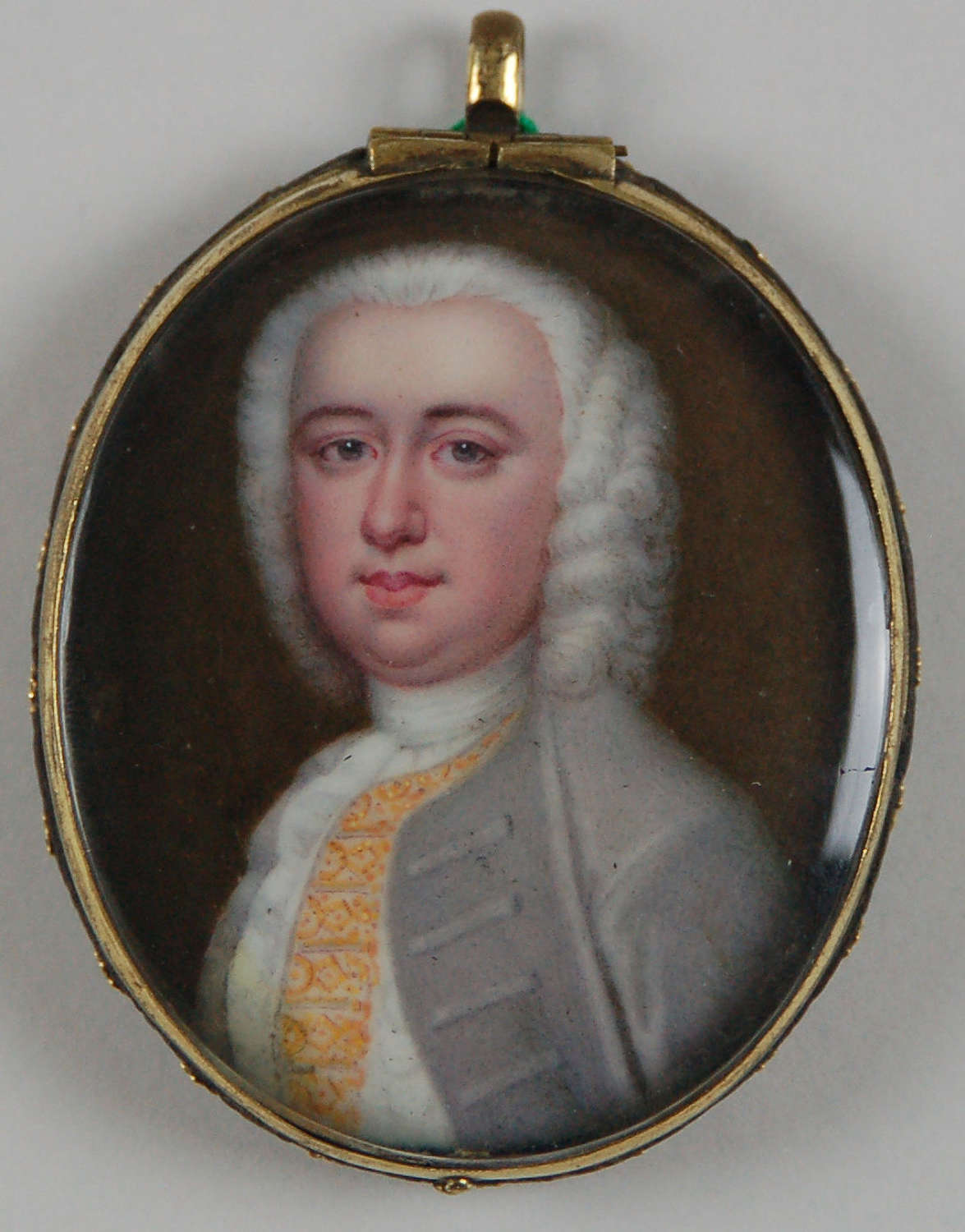
- Born: 1691; Norfolk
- Died: 1 April 1757 (aged 65–66)
- Occupation: Physician

William Wasey (1691 – 1 April 1757) was an English physician.

== Biography ==
Wasey was son of William Wasey, an attorney, who resided at Brunstead in Norfolk, and was born there in 1691. He was educated for five years at Norwich grammar school, and was admitted a pensioner at Caius College, Cambridge, on 2 November 1708. He was a scholar of the college from Michaelmas 1708 to Michaelmas 1715, and graduated B.A. in 1712–13 and M.A. in 1716. He matriculated at Leyden University on 1 October 1716, but, returning to Cambridge, he graduated M.D. in 1723. He was admitted a candidate of the College of Physicians, London, on 23 December 1723, and a fellow on 22 December 1724. He was censor of the college in 1731, 1736, 1739, and 1748; was named an elect on 30 August 1746; and was consiliarius in 1749 and 1754. On the death of James Jurin, he was elected president, 2 April 1750, and was reappointed 1750, 1751, 1752, and 1753. He was chosen physician to the Westminster Hospital at its foundation in 1719, but resigned his office there in 1733, having been one of the six physicians appointed to St. George's Hospital at the first general board held on 19 October of that year. He died on 1 April 1757. His library was sold by auction soon after his death.
