= Munk's Roll =

Series of biographies of fellows of the Royal College of Physicians

The Roll of the Royal College of Physicians of London, commonly referred to as Munk's Roll, is a series of published works containing biographical entries of the fellows of the Royal College of Physicians. It was published in print in eleven volumes (1861 to 2004) with a twelfth online (2005 to present). The series is now titled Inspiring Physicians (from 2020). The series has been informally known as Munk’s Roll, after the original compiler, for over a century. However, the formal name for the series of volumes (1-11) in print, is Lives of the Fellows of the Royal College of Physicians of London.

== History ==
Munk's Roll was initially the work of the College's Harveian Librarian, William Munk.

The first published edition (1861) was originally prepared as manuscript in three large volumes, containing biographical information on all physicians who were connected with the College, with no thought to publication. Each volume of the manuscript was presented to the College library upon its completion. The first volume covered the foundation of the College to 1600 (completed March 1855), the second covered 1601 to 1700 (completed December 1855), and the third volume 1701-1800 (completed in June 1856). The Council of the College, at the instigation of some influential Fellows, expressed the view in December 1860 that the work be published, and it was, in 1861.

The first edition consisted of volumes one and two, containing fellows and licentiates from 1518 to 1800. In 1878, volume three was included in the second edition, overseen by Munk, with biographies to 1825. The work was set out in chronological order with an index.

Subsequent editions, for biographies post 1825, were limited to fellows, which reflects the increasing numbers, qualifications and professionalism of physicians through the 19th century. They were titled Lives of the Fellows of the Royal College of Physicians of London.

=== Volumes ===
- Volume 1, 1518-1700
- Volume 2, 1701-1800
- Volume 3, 1801-1825
- Volume 4, 1826-1925
- Volume 5, 1926-1965
- Volume 6, 1966–1975, published 1982 (ed. Gordon Wolstenholme)
- Volume 7, 1976–1983, published 1984 (ed. Gordon Wolstenholme)
- Volume 8, 1984-1988
- Volume 9, 1989-1993
- Volume 10, 1994-1997
- Volume 11, 1998-2004
- Volume 12 (2005 onwards)

== Modern day ==
The Roll is a useful biographical resource for those interested in medical and social history, and family historians. All the print volumes are available online as part of the Inspiring Physicians series, which is updated with new biographies of deceased fellows.
