= Alcohol Change UK =

British charity

- Formation: 1984
- Legal status: Registered charity
- Purpose: Alcohol harm reduction in the UK
- Location: Unit 7, Finsbury Business Centre Clerkenwell, 40 Bowling Green Lane, London, EC1R 0NE
- Region served: United Kingdom
- Chief Executive: Richard Piper
- Trustee Board Chair: Mick Urwin
- Budget: £1 million p.a.
- Website: alcoholchange.org.uk

Alcohol Change UK is a British charity and campaign group founded in 1984 whose aim is to reduce the harm caused by alcohol. It is best known for its flagship awareness programs Alcohol Awareness Week and the Dry January challenge.

== History and organisation ==
Alcohol Concern was founded in 1984. In 2007 it became one of the 24 founding member organisations of Alcohol Health Alliance UK, a coalition of medical, charity and campaign organisations related to alcohol. In April 2017, Alcohol Concern merged with Alcohol Research UK, and in November 2018 the merged group was named Alcohol Change UK. It is now recognised as a national agency on alcohol misuse for the UK.

Since September 2017, the charity has been led by Chief Executive Officer Dr Richard Piper, previously of Roald Dahl's Marvellous Medicine Children's Charity. Mick Urwin is chair of the trustees.

== Activities ==
=== Annual campaigns ===
In May 2012, Alcohol Concern began promoting the Dry January challenge, a national campaign in the UK for people to give up drinking alcohol for the month of January each year. The first Dry January challenge was in 2013. The idea came from Emily Robinson, who gave up alcohol for January 2011 in preparation for a half marathon and joined Alcohol Concern in January 2012 while abstaining again. Public Health England began promoting the campaign in December 2014. In its first year, 4,000 people signed up for the Dry January challenge and it has grown in popularity ever since with nearly 9 million people planning to take a month off drinking in 2023.

Other countries are interested in bringing the Dry January challenge to their own populations with the Dry January campaign being licensed to take place in France, Switzerland, Norway, Austria, South Tyrol (Italy), and the USA.

Alcohol Awareness Week is run and managed by Alcohol Change UK. Each year, Alcohol Change UK sets the date and theme for the upcoming campaign and shares free digital resources for people to take part. The campaign has moved from its previous spot in November and now takes place every July.

=== Services ===
Consultancy and training

Alcohol Change UK offers training and consultancy services for professionals working in healthcare, housing and homelessness, social care, academia, or the emergency services, as well as in the workplace, to improve their policies and practices in supporting people with their drinking. Its flagship Blue Light approach helps to better support people with the most serious and chronic alcohol problems, who often have multiple needs.

Research

Alcohol Change UK funds, commissions, and conducts research to strengthen the evidence base and improve the lives of those affected by alcohol harm.

=== Advocacy ===
Alcohol Change UK acts as the secretariat and public enquiry point for the All-Party Parliamentary Group (APPG) on Alcohol Harm, which exists to discuss alcohol-related issues and make related recommendations to government. The current chair of the group is Christian Wakeford MP.

== Funding ==
Alcohol Change UK is an independent charity, with income from an investment fund, grants, donations from supporters, and charges for consultancy and training.

== See also ==
- Alcoholism
- Action on Addiction
