= Foundation for Liver Research =

British medical research charity

The Foundation for Liver Research is a UK medical research charity dedicated to hepatology. It funds the Institute of Hepatology in central London. In the 2024 financial year the majority of its funding came from investors (2.35 million pounds), followed by donations and legacies (525 thousand pounds). David George Green considered the foundation "a centre of excellence in the UK".

In March 2013 the Foundation for Liver Research released a mini-documentary illustrating the work performed at the Institute of Hepatology at the time. In 2024 it cofounded the Roger Williams Institute of Liver Studies with King's College, London (KCL). In 2017 the foundation published a report by foundation director Roger Williams on the "financial impact of liver disease" and proposed policy-based solutions including stronger regulation on alcohol, targeted taxes, and a minimum unit price for alcoholic drinks. The report was welcomed by hepatologist Sir Ian Gilmore.

The foundation was previously known as the Liver Research Trust.
