= Henry Atkins (physician) =

English physician (1558–1635)

Henry Atkins (1558–1635) was an English physician.

== Life ==
Atkins was the son of Richard Atkins of Great Berkhamsted, Hertfordshire. Matriculating at Trinity College, Oxford, in 1574, he graduated there and afterwards proceeded M.D. at Nantes. In 1588, he became fellow of the College of Physicians of London, and in 1606 president. He was re-elected in 1607, 1608, 1616, 1617, 1624, and 1625.

In 1597 Atkins sailed as physician to Robert Devereux, 2nd Earl of Essex in the Islands Voyage, but was sea-sick, had to be put on shore, and resigned the appointment. His replacement was Thomas Moundeford.

In 1604 Atkins was sent by James I to Scotland to bring back his son Charles, Duke of York. Atkins was given £100 in advance for his expenses. Prince Charles stayed at Dunfermline Palace for a year in the care of Alexander Seton, 1st Earl of Dunfermline after his mother Anne of Denmark had gone to England. Atkins wrote to her from Dunfermline in July 1604 saying the Prince, who was slow to learn to walk, could now walk the length of the "great chamber" or "longest chamber" several times daily without the use of a stick.

Atkins and Prince Charles began their journey south to London in July 1603. They were met at Berwick-upon-Tweed on 21 July by Arthur Gray, brother of Ralph Gray of Chillingham. They stopped at Fountains Hall, the house of Stephen Proctor. They stayed at Worksop Manor in August 1604, Atkins described four days of music, and young Duke of York's initiation into hunting, when deer were driven close to the house.

In 1611 the king is said to have offered Atkins the first baronet's patent. In 1612 Atkins was called into consultation during the last illness of Henry, Prince of Wales, and his opinion was that the disease was a putrid fever "without malignity, except that attending putridity". He suggested bleeding. His signature, as one of the king's physicians, stands next to that of Theodore Mayerne in the original report of the post-mortem examination.

Atkins also attended the deathbed of the Earl of Salisbury in May 1612. He attended Anne of Denmark with Theodore de Mayerne at Hampton Court in October 1618.

Of significance to the medical professions was the division of the Grocers' Company allowing the formation of the chartered Apothecaries' Company from 1617. Resistance to the proposals of Atkins for the split had come from Sir William Paddy. In 1618, under the active presidency of Atkins, the College of Physicians issued the first London Pharmacopeia.

Atkins married Mary Pigot of Dodershall, Buckinghamshire. He lived in Warwick Court, enjoyed a large practice, and died rich on 21 September 1635. He left an only child, afterwards Sir Henry Atkins, and was buried in Cheshunt church, where a monument was placed. He was a benefactor of the College of Physicians.

In 1621 Alice Fortescue, widow of John Fortescue of Salden sold Tickford Priory in Newport Pagnell to Atkins for £4,500.
