= Roger Williams (hepatologist) =

British hepatologist (1931–2020)

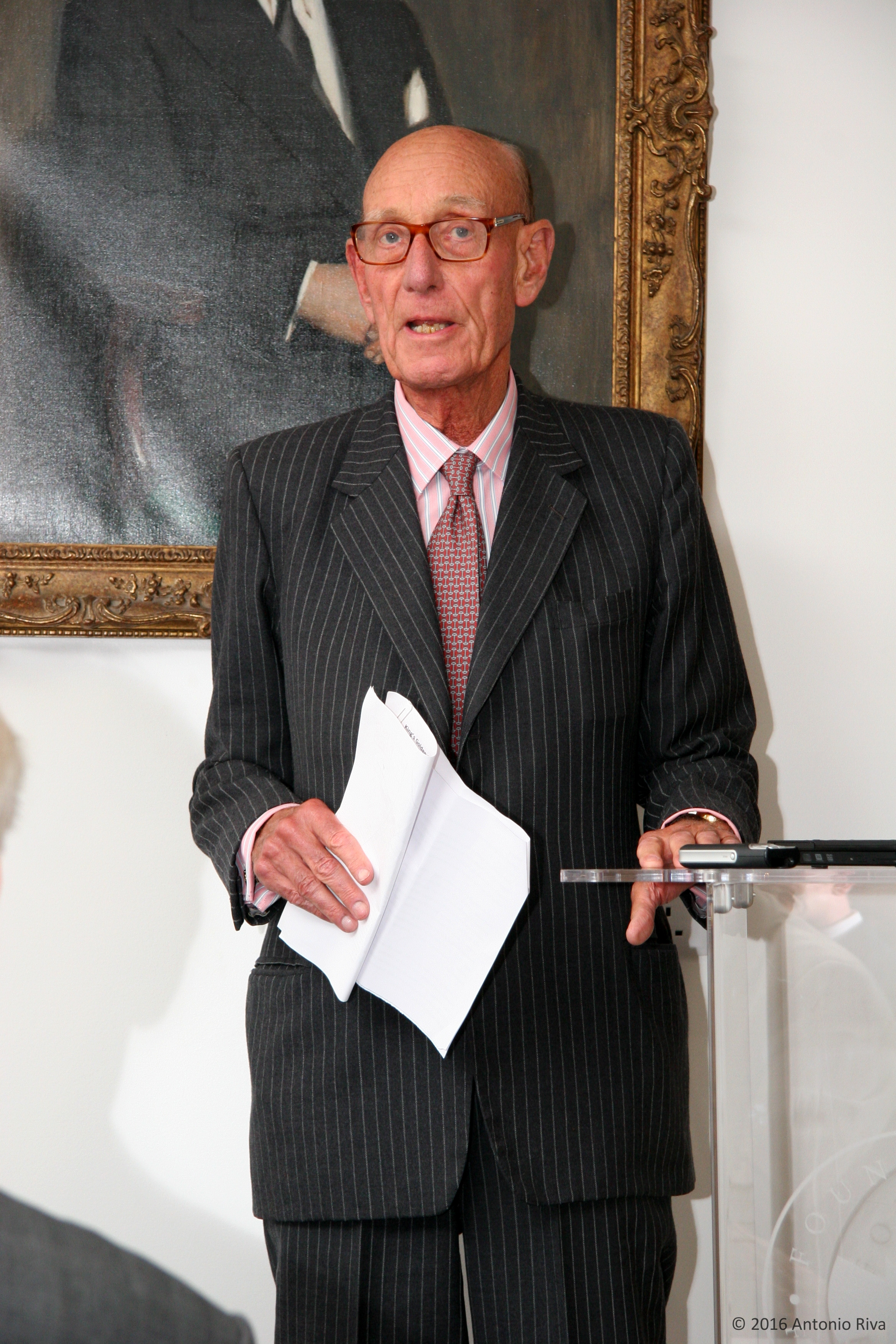

Roger Stanley Williams (28 August 1931 – 26 July 2020) was a British professor of hepatology (treatment of pathological conditions of the liver). He was Director of the Institute of Hepatology, London and Professor of Hepatology, King's College London. He was also Medical Director of the charity, the Foundation for Liver Research a UK registered charity (RCN 1134579) and was the lead person of the Lancet Commission into Liver Disease in the UK.

He was educated at St Mary's College, Southampton, and The London Hospital Medical College (now Barts and Royal London Medical School), graduating MBBS in 1949. After National Service in the RAMC, he worked at the Postgraduate Medical School, London and between 1959-1965 was a Lecturer in Medicine in Professor Sheila Sherlock's Liver Unit at the Royal Free Hospital, including a year as the Rockefeller Travelling Fellow in Medicine at the Presbyterian Hospital, New York.

Appointed as Clinical Tutor and Consultant Physician at King's College Hospital in 1966, he set up a Unit dedicated to research into liver disorders based on multidisciplinary groups of scientists, physicians and surgeons. Together with Sir Roy Calne, he pioneered liver transplantation in the UK, the first liver transplant at King's College Hospital being carried out on September 28, 1968. Other pioneering work in acute liver failure led to the first dedicated unit for patients with this condition. The Liver Unit was recognised in 1992 by King's College London as an Institute of Liver Studies.

In 1996, Roger Williams moved to a new research Institute at University College London, funded by the Foundation for Liver Research. New areas of translational clinical study were initiated including Living Donor Liver Transplantation and devices for temporary liver support. His return to King's College Hospital in June 2016 followed an invitation from the Chairman of the Hospital to relocate the Institute of Hepatology to that site.

Professor Williams received numerous awards and medals, the most notable of these being the Distinguished Achievement Award of the American Association for the Study of Liver Disease in 2013, the first British subject to have this honour. Other awards include the American Society of Transplantation Senior Achievement Award in 2004, a Hans Popper Lifetime Achievement Award in 2008, and the Distinguished Service Award of the International Liver Transplant Society in 2011. He was a Fellow of the Academy of Medical Sciences, Honorary Fellow of the American College of Physicians and of the Irish College of Physicians. He was a founder member of European Association for the Study of the Liver (EASL), serving as Chairman in 1983 and as Honorary President in 2008. He was appointed CBE for services to medicine in 1993. He was the author of approximately 3000 papers, chapters and reviews published in learned journals and books. In 2010 he was quoted as the most cited researcher of the year in his specialty by ISI Thomson Scientific.

Professor Williams practiced at King's College Hospital and in the Harley Street Diagnostic Clinic until he died in 2020.

Outside medicine, his interests were opera, piano music and sport. He enjoyed tennis and yacht racing and was a member of the Royal Yacht Squadron and Royal Ocean Racing Club.

He died on 26 July 2020 at the age of 88.
