= Othowell Meverall =

English physician

- Born: 1585; Derbyshire
- Died: 13 July 1648 (aged 62–63)
- Occupation: Physician

Othowell Meverall (1585 – 13 July 1648) was an English physician.

== Biography ==
Meverall was born in 1585 in Derbyshire, and after education at home became a member of Christ's College, Cambridge, where he graduated B.A. In 1608, while living in that college, he had an illness, probably smallpox. The method of treatment then adopted included the closing of all apertures of the sick room, and often resulted in the partial asphyxiation of the patient when almost convalescent. He became insensible and was supposed to be dead. The preparations for his burial by exposing him to fresh air revived him, and he was thus restored to life after a narrow escape from being buried alive. He went to Leyden, and there graduated M.D. on 2 October 1613. On this degree he was incorporated at Cambridge 15 March 1616. He settled in practice in the city of London, and was elected a fellow of the Royal College of Physicians 21 April 1618. He was censor for eight years between 1624 and 1640, was registrar 1639–40, and president 1641–4. His graduation thesis at Leyden is extant in manuscript (information from Dr. Munk), as are the notes of the anatomy lectures which he read at the College of Physicians in November 1628 (Sloane MS. 2614 A). On 28 December 1637 (Young, Annals of Barber-Surgeons, p. 367) it was resolved by the court of assistants of the Barber-Surgeons Company that ‘Dr. Meverell shalbe Reader of our anatomical lectures at the next publique discection to be held in the new erected Theater;’ and 8 November 1638, ‘that there shalbe presented as the guift of this Compaine to Mr. Doctor Meverell a peece of plate with the Compaines scutchion ingraven thereon for his paynes in readeing at our last publiqe anatomye in the new Theater before the Lords of his Majesties most honourable privye Councell and others, spectators in the time of those 3 dayes readeings.’ The lectures began with a prayer (Sloane MS. 2614 A), beginning, ‘Deo autem optimo et maximo æternas agamus gratias.’ Then followed an introduction in Latin, then the dissection was carried out under the lecturer's direction, and with his explanations, and at the end he again gave a short address. Its last words were ‘vos autem gratias agite chirurgiæ proceribus et anatomiæ magistris his quia dextri et artificiose putridum hoc cadaver dissecaverunt.’ In his pocket notebook (ib.) he has written below, ‘Sic perorabam in theatro anatomico chirurgorum, Londin: 13 April 1638.’ He resigned the office at the end of that year. His notebooks show that he was well read in Cicero, and what might not have been expected of a Ciceronian and Grecian he quotes Rhazes as well as Hippocrates and Galen. Some few notes of cases, general notes on diseases, and numerous prescriptions are contained in his notebooks, as well as a rhythmical declamation in Latin on ‘The fear of the Lord is the beginning of wisdom.’ He died 13 July 1648, and was buried in the church of St. Lawrence Jewry. He left 40l. to the College of Physicians, and to several of the fellows a gold ring with the inscription, ‘Medici morimur, medicina perennis.’ He is to be distinguished from Dr. Andrew Meverell of Trinity College, Cambridge, elected a fellow of the College of Physicians in December 1664, to whom John Pechey's ‘Observations on the Therapeutic Value of the Byzantine Cockroach’ are addressed.
