= Richard Forster (physician) =

English physician

Richard Forster (c.1546–1616) was an English physician.

== Life ==
He was son of Laurence Forster, and was born at Coventry about 1546, and was educated at All Souls' College, Oxford. He graduated at Oxford, M.B. and M.D., both in 1573.

He became a fellow of the College of Physicians of London about 1575, but his admission is not mentioned in the Annals. In 1583, he was elected one of the censors, in 1600, treasurer, and Lumleian lecturer in 1602. He was president of the college from 1601 to 1604, and was again elected in 1615 and held office till his death on 27 March 1616. He had considerable medical practice, and was also esteemed as a mathematician, as reported by William Camden, when recording his death, William Clowes, the surgeon, praises him, and in 1591, writes of Forster as 'a worthie reader of the surgerie lector in the Phisition's college,' showing that he gave lectures before the Lumleian lectures were formally instituted in 1602.

He was a practicing astrologer, and it was through Forster that Christopher Heydon's manuscript An Astrological Discourse with Mathematical Demonstrations, defending astrology, passed to Nicholas Fiske. Astrologer Richard Harvey indicated him as a leader of the astrologer-physicians.

In 1582, he was appointed Consul of the English nation in Ottoman Syria, in "the parts of Alepo, Damasco, Aman, Tripolis, Jerusalem, and all other ports whatsoever in the provinces of Syria, Palestina, and Jurie"

== Works ==
In 1567, he dedicated to Henry FitzAlan, 19th Earl of Arundel an astrological work. Forster had been introduced to Robert Dudley, 1st Earl of Leicester, by Sir Henry Sidney, and dedicated to the earl in 1575 his ephemerides. Besides the prose dedication, in which astronomy is said to be the handmaid of medicine, twenty lines of Latin verse on Leicester's cognisance, the bear, precede the tables of which the book is made up.
