= Mumtaz Patel =

British medical doctor

- Born: Preston, Lancashire, UK
- Education: University of Manchester
- Known for: President of the Royal College of Physicians (2025)
- Medical career
- Profession: Physician
- Field: Nephrology
- Institutions: Manchester Royal Infirmary
- Sub-specialties: Kidney disease
- Research: Lupus nephritis Medical education

Mumtaz Patel is a British nephrologist and the president of the Royal College of Physicians of London. Between 2020 and 2023 she was the RCP's global vice president and vice president for education and training between 2023 and 2025. Patel was initially appointed as acting as president in 2024, following the resignation of Sarah Clarke, before being elected in April 2025. She is the first Muslim and first woman of Indian origin to hold the role.

== Early life, education, and personal life ==
Mumtaz Patel was born and grew up in Preston, Lancashire, to parents who emigrated from India in the late 1960s. Her father worked in the cotton mills and her mother was a housewife. After completing her early education in inner city Preston, she studied medicine at the University of Manchester, graduating in 1996. Patel has a daughter and a son.

== Career ==
Patel was a pre-registration house officer at the Manchester Royal Infirmary and senior house officer at Leeds General Infirmary and Wythenshawe Hospital. She subsequently pursued a career in renal medicine. Patel has cited her mother as her inspiration for studying medicine and was inspired to become a nephrologist due to early childhood experiences of witnessing her uncle from Zambia with diabetes and kidney failure having dialysis at home. In 2003, while a specialty registrar, the Wellcome Trust funded her PhD which was awarded in 2006 in Manchester for her research into the genetics of lupus nephritis. In 2007 she was appointed as a consultant at the Manchester Royal Infirmary. In the same year, her mother died of a glioblastoma. Patel became a fellow of the Royal College of Physicians in 2011. The following year, she became postgraduate associate dean in the north-west. Patel obtained an MSc in Medical Education in 2014. From 2016 to 2020, she was the Joint Royal Colleges of Physicians Training Board's Clinical Quality Lead. Patel has been the University of Liverpool School of Medicine's director of progress and conduct since 2018.

From 2020 to 2023 Patel served as the RCP's global vice president. In 2022, she launched the Global Women Leaders Programme, which aims to support female doctors in achieving leadership positions. The programme has run paid workshops in Hong Kong, India, Iraq, Jordan, Pakistan, and Sri Lanka. Patel was elected the RCP's senior censor and vice president for education and training in April 2023. She received "The Outstanding Leader Award" at the EMMS International's Global Women in Healthcare Awards in 2024. In the same year, following the resignation of the then RCP president Sarah Clarke in June, Patel was appointed as acting as president by the college council. Clarke had resigned after 80 RCP fellows and separately five of the six senior officers (including Patel) had called for her resignation as they felt she had lost the confidence of the membership over her management of the college's policy towards physician associates. The King's Fund conducted an independent learning review into the RCP's extraordinary general meeting in March 2024 on physician associates and found that there was a "pervasive lack of trust and confidence in the College's governance", "a lack of due process" in conduct of the members' survey, inability of the college to "listen and respond effectively to member issues", and "broader cultural and behaviour issues". As acting president, she accepted in full the findings and vowed to improve. Patel was elected the RCP's president by fellows in April 2025 with 2,239 votes out of 5,151 on a turnout of 36.3%. She is the first woman of Indian origin and first Muslim to hold the role.

At the RCP Annual General Meeting in September 2025, fellows voted to allow collegiate members to vote in vice-president and councillor elections. This was the first time that the franchise had been extended since the RCP's foundation and was formally implemented in time for the March 2026 elections.

== Selected publications ==
- Patel, Mumtaz; Clarke, Alexandra M.; Bruce, Ian N.; Symmons, Deborah P. M. (September 2006). "The prevalence and incidence of biopsy-proven lupus nephritis in the UK: Evidence of an ethnic gradient". Arthritis and Rheumatism. 54 (9): 2963–2969. doi:10.1002/art.22079. ISSN 0004-3591. PMID 16947632. (Co-author)
- Goddard, Andrew F.; Patel, Mumtaz (13 March 2021). "The changing face of medical professionalism and the impact of COVID-19". Lancet. 397 (10278): 950–952. doi:10.1016/S0140-6736(21)00436-0. ISSN 1474-547X. PMC 7906722. PMID 33636125. (Co-author)
- "RCP Global Women Leaders Programme" (PDF). Journal of Pakistan Society Internal Medicine. 5 (1). 2024.
