= William Baronsdale =

English physician

William Baronsdale (died 1608), was an English physician.

Baronsdale was born in Gloucestershire, probably about 1530–40. He was educated at St. John's College, Cambridge, being admitted a scholar 5 Nov. 1551, and took his first degree B.A. in 1554–5, that of M.A. 1556, and that of M.D. in 1568. He was a senior fellow and bursar of his college, and twice held the lectureship on medicine founded by Linacre, being elected to the office first on 10 Jan. 1561–2, and again 26 May 1564. Proceeding to London, he was elected a fellow of the College of Physicians, though in what year is not recorded; and afterwards held the offices of counsellor in 1588, 1600, 1602, and 1604; censor from 1581 to 1585; and treasurer in 1583 (being the first fellow appointed to this newly founded office), 1604, 1605, and 1607. Further, he was president of the college for eleven successive years, from 1589 to 1600. He is identified as the 'Dr Barsdale' who attended Mary, Queen of Scots at Sheffield in April 1582.
