= David Oliver (doctor) =

British physician

- Born: 13 January 1966 (age 60); Manchester, England
- Occupation: Physician
- Known for: Past President of the British Geriatrics Society blogger
- Medical career
- Profession: doctor
- Field: geriatric medicine

David Oliver is a British consultant geriatrician. He was President of the British Geriatrics Society from 2014 to 2016. He is Visiting Professor of Medicine for Older People in the School of Community and Health Sciences at City University London and a King's Fund Senior Visiting Fellow. He was formerly the UK Department of Health National Clinical Director for Older People's Services from 2009 to 2013. He is a researcher, writer, teacher and lecturer on services for older people and a regular blogger, columnist and media commentator. He was elected as Clinical Vice President of the Royal College of Physicians, London. In April 2022 he was elected as president of the Royal College of Physicians but withdrew in July 2022 after he had contracted Covid 19 and "no longer felt able to do it justice".

== Early life and education ==
Oliver was born on 13 January 1966 in Withington Community Hospital, Manchester, England. His father Fred is a retired old age psychiatrist. Oliver's early education was at Northenden County Primary School and the private Manchester Grammar School. He studied pre-clinical medicine at The Queen's College, Oxford in 1984 before transferring to Trinity Hall, Cambridge to study clinical medicine in 1987; graduating in 1989.

== Career ==
Oliver worked nine years as a resident doctor in various hospitals in England during which he chose to specialise in geriatrics. He became a consultant geriatrician in 1998 and initially worked in South London between 1998 and 2004. Oliver then moved to work at the Royal Berkshire Hospital in Reading, England where he has been based since.

== Academic and research activities ==
Oliver began his research career whilst a registrar at St Thomas' Hospital in London. He gained his research doctorate from the University of London in 2001. He was a Senior Lecturer in the School of Health and Social care at the University of Reading from 2004 to 2009 alongside his consultant contract at the Royal Berkshire NHS Foundation Trust. He has been involved with City University London. He is a visiting professor at the University of Surrey.

== National leadership and advisory roles ==
Alongside his clinical work Oliver was on secondment to the Department of Health from 2009 to 2013, first as specialist clinical advisor leading the national programme of work on Falls and Bone Health and then as National Clinical Director for Older Peoples Services. In his government role he developed national policies around the care of older people, advised Ministers and officials and provided assistance to other clinicians with their own local services. He stood down to take on his role as BGS President-Elect, when National Clinical Director roles moved from the Department of Health to NHS England.

He became President of the British Geriatrics Society, in November 2014, having been appointed for a 2-year period.

== Opinions, media and commentary ==
Since July 2015 he has written a weekly freelance column for The BMJ called "Acute Perspective". Oliver has written blogs for the King's Fund, The BMJ website, the British Geriatrics Society and guest blogs for other sites such as the Nuffield Trust. He writes regular opinion pieces for the Health Service Journal and BMJ and others in the national and professional press. He regularly comments on services for older people in print and broadcast media. He has appeared on BBC 1 (The Big Questions, News); BBC News Channel, BBC Radio 4 and 5 and BBC World Service, on Sky News and on numerous local radio stations. He has been quoted in The Independent, The Times, The Guardian, The Daily Telegraph, Daily Mirror and Daily Mail. He was written for several other outlets in professional and general press.

He is a senior visiting fellow at the King's Fund. In 2014, he was the lead author of the keynote Kings Fund Paper "Making Health and Care Systems fit for an Ageing Population". He was also one of the commissioners for the Health Service Journal "Commission on Hospital Care for Frail Older People". He has campaigned on discrimination against older people in the British National Health Service, against the attitude being that the person is old and there is nothing that can be done about it. He challenges plans for large reductions in older people in acute hospitals, saying it is "absolute la la land to think we're going to be in a situation any time soon where older people don't still keep piling through the doors of general hospitals." He has also written about the need to focus more on healthy ageing, to make health and care professionals better trained in the care of older people. He has criticised the large NHS spend on management consultancy and pushed the case for NHS staff to learn more from other organisations within the NHS, criticised the idea that more aggressive regulation and inspection and "accountability" can bring about quality improvement in services and attacked contestible but prevalent "groupthink" and oft repeated "factoids" from the health policy "commentariat" and made the case for improving the care for older people in nursing homes rather than pretending no-one will ever need or want to be admitted to one.

== Awards and honours ==
In 2014, he was named by the Health Service Journal as one of the top 100 Clinical Leaders in England and as one of the top 50 Leaders in Integrated Care.
