= Thomas Moundeford =

English academic and physician

Thomas Moundeford M.D. (1550–1630) was an English academic and physician, President of the London College of Physicians for three periods.

== Life ==
The fourth son of Osbert Moundeford and his wife Bridget, daughter of Sir John Spelman of Narborough, Norfolk, he was born at Feltwell. He was educated at Eton College and admitted a scholar of King's College, Cambridge, on 16 August 1568. On 17 August 1571 he was admitted a fellow, and graduated B.A. 1572 and M.A. 1576. On 18 July 1580 he moved to the study of medicine. From 1580 to 1583 he was bursar of King's College and left the college in August 1583. He continued to reside in Cambridge till he had graduated M.D.

Moundeford then moved to London, and 9 April 1593 was a licentiate of the College of Physicians, and 29 January 1594 a fellow. He lived in Milk Street in the City of London. He was a royal physician, attending Elizabeth I and then James I. Among his patients in the 1590s was Mary Glover, who became prominent as a supposed victim of demonic possession; Moundeford took her condition to be natural. The matter went to a celebrated trial, of Elizabeth Jackson accused of bewitching Glover, that divided the College, Francis Herring testifying for the prosecution case. Edward Jorden and John Argent supported the defence; but they lost the argument, with Moundeford apparently weighed on the other side.

Moundeford was seven times a censor of the College of Physicians, was treasurer in 1608, and president 1612, 1613, 1614, 1619, 1621, 1622, and 1623. In 1611 he was called in to attend Arbella Stuart. Taking her side, or at least advocating for more sympathetic treatment, he suffered brief imprisonment at the time she was planning to escape to France.

In later life, Moundeford became blind. He died in 1630 at the house of his son-in-law Sir John Bramston in Philip Lane, London. He was buried in the church of St. Mary Magdalen, Milk Street.

== Works ==
In 1599 Moundeford published a translation of a French work by André Du Laurens into Latin, as De morbis melancholicis Tractatus. He became a recognised expert on melancholia.

Moundeford published in 1622 a small book entitled Vir Bonus, a summary of what experience had taught him. The book is divided into four parts, "Temperantia", "Prudentia", "Justicia", and "Fortitude". He praised the king, denounced smoking, and alluded to the Basilicon Doron. He drew on his reading in the classics and Church Fathers.

== Family ==
Moundeford in 1583 married Mary Hill, daughter of Richard Hill, mercer, of Milk Street, London. His wife died in her ninety-fourth year, in 1656, in the house in which they had lived together in Milk Street. Mary was a devout Anglican; their parish priest was James Speght, a neighbour and father of Rachel Speght. Moundeford's Vir Bonus showed him to be an admirer of Theodore Beza,

They had two sons: Osbert, admitted a scholar of King's College, Cambridge, on 25 August 1601, aged 16; and Richard, admitted a scholar of the same college on 25 August 1603. Both died before their father, and their epitaph, in English verse, is given in John Stow's London. It was in the church of St. Mary Magdalen. He had also two daughters, Bridget, who in 1606 married Sir John Bramston, and Katharine, who married Christopher Rander of Burton, Lincolnshire. His 11th great grandson is now a doctor
