= Faculty of Physician Associates =

Professional membership body in the UK

- Established: 2 July 2015; 11 years ago
- Dissolved: 16 December 2024; 22 months ago
- Members: 5,270
- Affiliations: Royal College of Physicians of London

The Faculty of Physician Associates (FPA) was the professional membership body for physician associates (PAs) in the United Kingdom. Established in 2015 as a faculty of the Royal College of Physicians (RCP), it was responsible for reviewing and setting standards for the education and training of physician associates, and management of the Physician Associate Managed Voluntary Register (PAMVR). RCP President and consultant gastroenterologist Andrew Goddard partly received his knighthood in 2022 for helping to create the FPA in his previous role as RCP Registrar.

Its predecessor organisation was the UK Association of Physician Assistants (UKAPA), which was created in 2005. The UKAPA voted to change the name of their profession to physician associates in 2013 after the Department of Health and Social Care advised that being called "assistants" could prove an obstacle to securing statutory regulation of the profession.

The RCP approved the membership of the president of the FPA to its governing council in 2018 with full voting rights. In 2022 the president of the organisation was Jamie Saunders who worked in haematology at University College London Hospitals NHS Foundation Trust, and its vice-president was Chandran Louis who works in urology at St George's University Hospitals NHS Foundation Trust. Saunders and Louis both resigned in June 2024. Saunders was succeeded by Andrew Jones who works in upper gastrointestinal surgery at the Countess of Chester Hospital and served as its last president.

After the RCP held an extraordinary general meeting in March 2024 on the topic of PAs which resulted in fellows voting to limit the pace and scale of PA rollout in the NHS, it was announced that the FPA would close within a year. The FPA closed on 31 December 2024 with the PAMVR closing to new entrants on 16 December when the General Medical Council became the regulator for PAs with a final membership count of 5,092 PAs and 178 anaesthesia associates.
