= Richard Bartlot =

English physician

Richard Bartlot (Bartlet, Barthlet) (1471–1557), was an English physician.

Bartlot was a fellow of All Souls' College, Oxford and took the degree of M.B. at Oxford in 1501, and supplicated for that of M.D. in 1508. He was the first fellow admitted into the College of Physicians after its foundation in 1518, and he was president in 1527, 1528, 1531, 1548. He lived in Blackfriars, and was buried in the church of St. Bartholomew the Great. Dr. Caius, as president, with the whole college attended his funeral. He had considerable landed property, and endowed All Souls with his estate at Edgware, and left the foundation some plate at his death.
