= Royal College of Physicians =

British professional body of doctors

Coordinates: 51°31′33″N 00°08′42″W

Royal College of Physicians of London

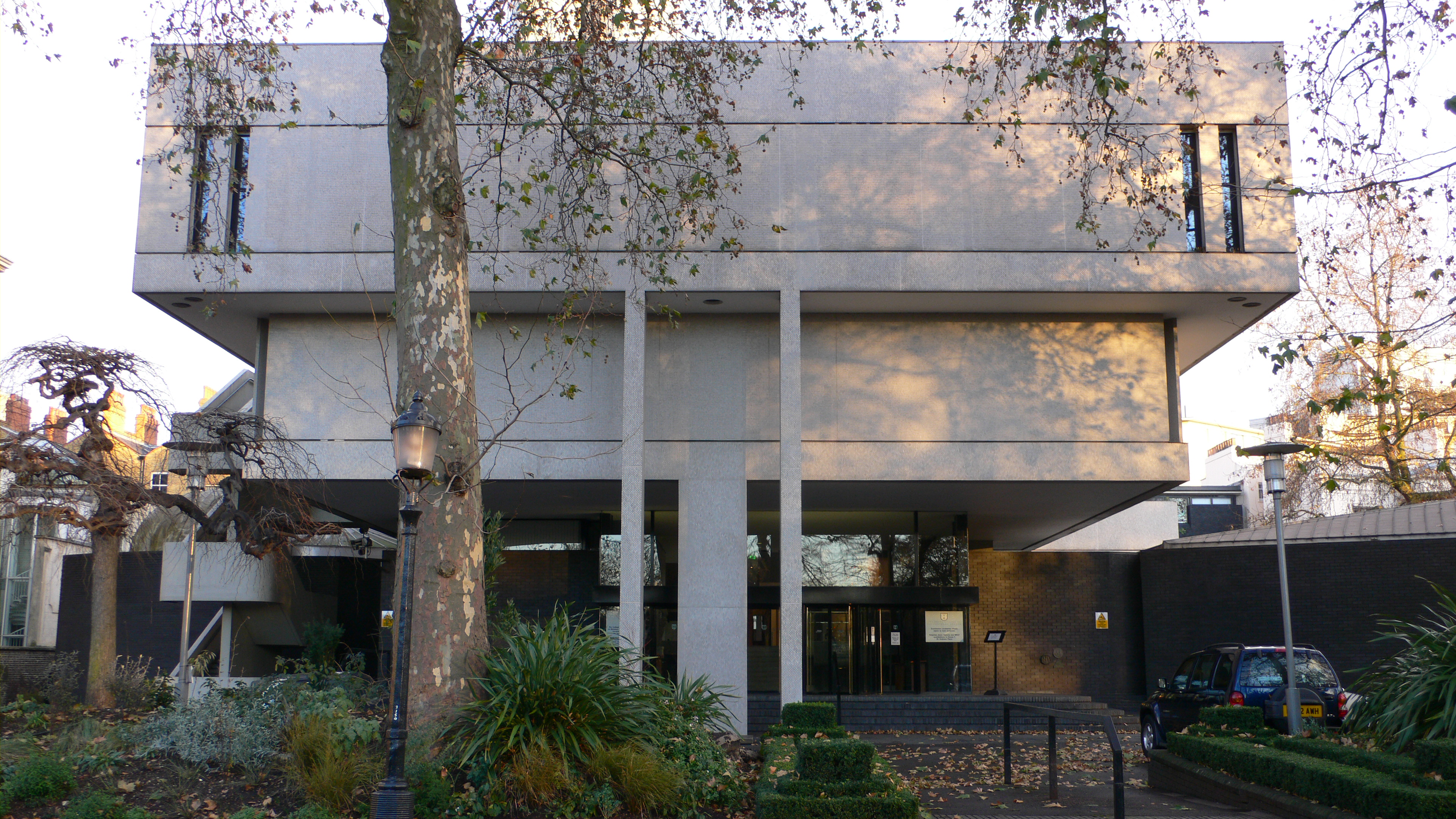
- The Royal College of Physicians headquarters is a Grade I listed building
- Established: 1518; 508 years ago
- Type: Medical royal college
- Headquarters: Regent's Park, London, England
- Members: 40,000 (May 2021)
- President: Mumtaz Patel
- Affiliations: Academy of Medical Royal Colleges
- Staff: 414 (2019)
- Website: www.rcp.ac.uk

The Royal College of Physicians (RCP) is a British professional membership body dedicated to improving the practice of medicine, chiefly through the accreditation of physicians by examination. Founded by royal charter from King Henry VIII in 1518, as the College of Physicians, the RCP is the oldest medical college in England.

The RCP's home in Regent's Park is one of the few post-war buildings to be listed at Grade I. In 2016 it was announced that the RCP was to open new premises in Liverpool at The Spine, a new building in the Liverpool Knowledge Quarter. The Spine opened in May 2021.

== History ==
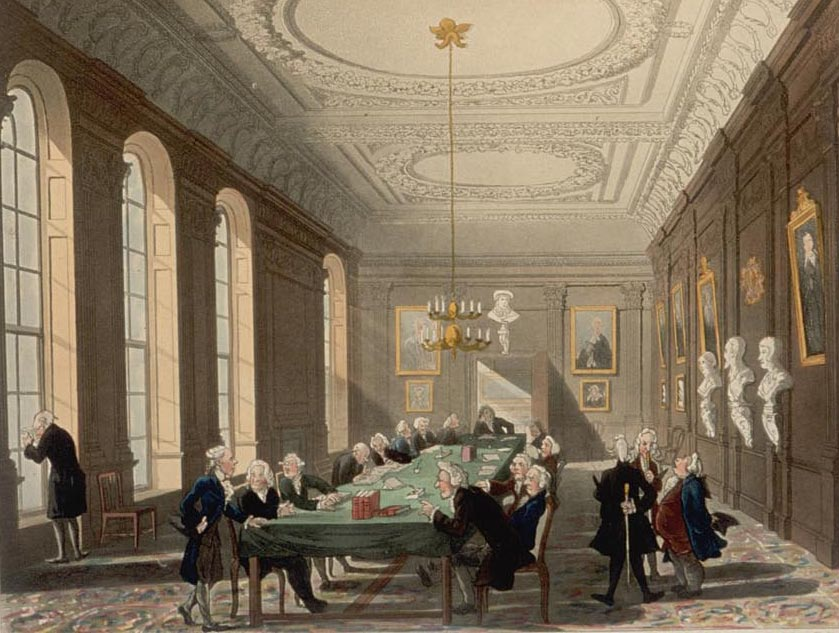
A college meeting in the early 19th century

Physicians Act 1523 (Note: The citation of this act by this short title was authorised by section 5 of, and the second schedule to, the Statute Law Revision Act 1948. Due to the repeal of those provisions, it is now authorised by section 19(2) of the Interpretation Act 1978.)
- Act of Parliament
- Parliament of England
- Long title: The Privileges and Authority of Physicians in London.
- Citation: 14 & 15 Hen. 8. c. 5
- Territorial extent: England and Wales

Dates
- Royal assent: 13 August 1523
- Commencement: 15 April 1523 (Note: Start of session.)
- Repealed: 30 July 1948
Other legislation
| Repealed by | Medical Act 1860; Statute Law Revision Act 1948 |
| Relates to | College of Physicians Act 1553 |

Status: Repealed

Text of statute as originally enacted

College of Physicians Act 1553
- Act of Parliament
- Parliament of England
- Long title: An Acte touching thincorporations of the Phisitions in London.
- Citation: 1 Mar. Sess. 2. c. 9
- Territorial extent: England and Wales

Dates
- Royal assent: 5 December 1553
- Commencement: 24 October 1553
- Repealed: 30 July 1948
Other legislation
| Amended by | Statute Law Revision Act 1888 |
| Repealed by | Food and Drugs Act 1938Statute Law Revision Act 1948 |
| Relates to | Physicians Act 1523 |

Status: Repealed

Text of statute as originally enacted

Royal College of Physicians of London Act 1960 (Note: Section 1.)
- Act of Parliament
- Parliament of the United Kingdom
- Long title: An Act to confer further powers on the Royal College of Physicians of London to confirm the name of the College and for other purposes.
- Citation: 8 & 9 Eliz. 2. c. xvii
- Territorial extent: United Kingdom

Dates
- Royal assent: 2 June 1960
- Commencement: 2 June 1960 (Note: The Acts of Parliament (Commencement) Act 1793.)
Other legislation
| Amends | London Faculty of Physic (Meetings) Act 1814 |
| Relates to | Medical Act 1858; Medical Acts Amendment Act 1860; Medical Act 1886 |

Status: Current legislation

Text of statute as originally enacted

The college was incorporated as "the President and College or Commonalty of the Faculty of Physic in London" when it received a royal charter in 1518, affirmed by Act of Parliament in 1523. It is not known when the name "Royal College of Physicians of London" was first assumed or granted. It came into use after the charter of 1663, and was used to make reference to the college in the Medical Act 1858. It was legally authorised as the college's corporate name by the Royal College of Physicians of London Act 1960, the function of which was primarily to move the premises of the college outside the cities of London or Westminster to Regent's Park.

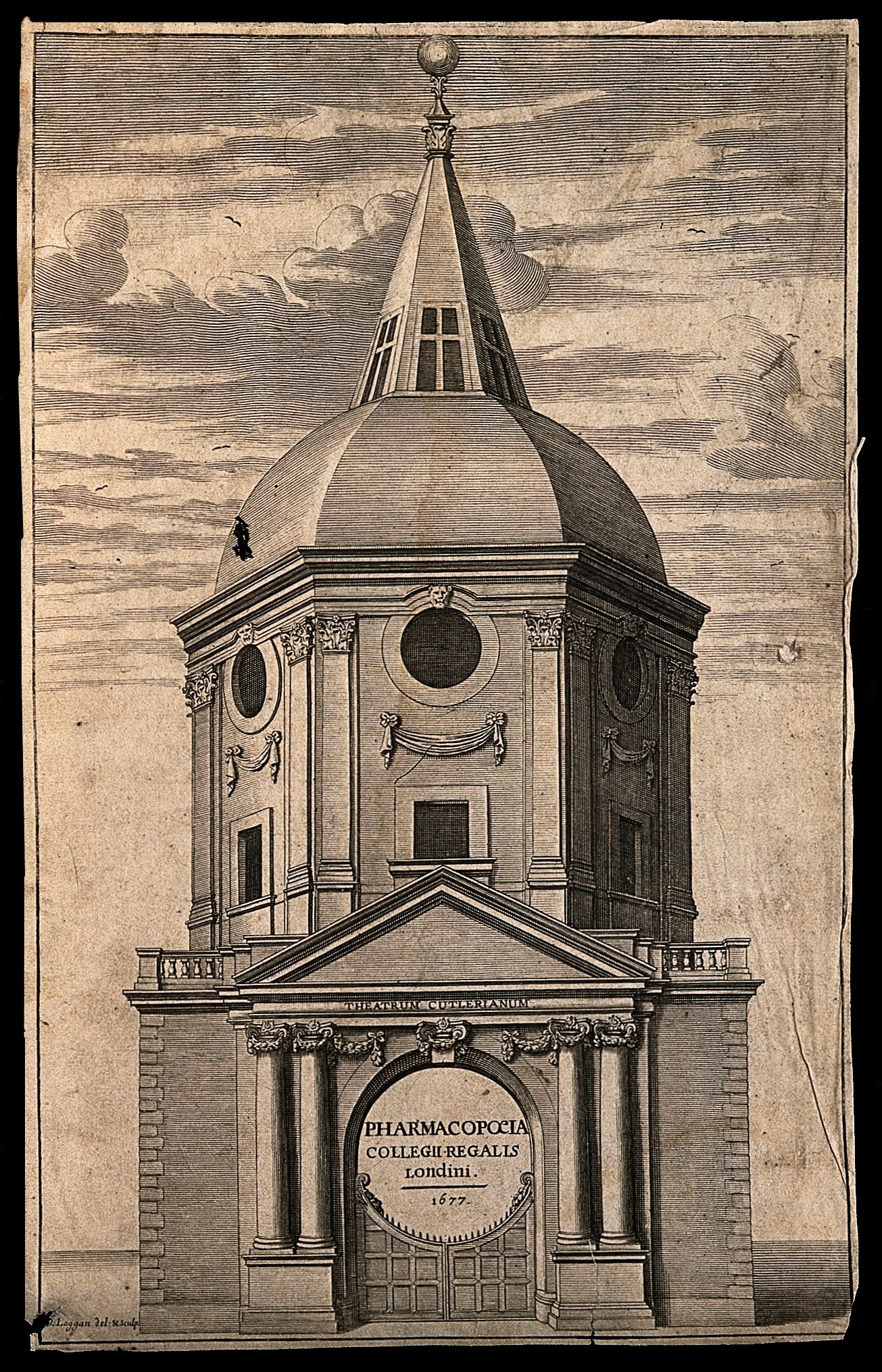
The Cutlerian Theatre in Warwick Lane, an anatomy theatre designed by Robert Hooke rebuilt after the Fire (demolished 1866). The frontispiece to the Royal College's pharmacopeia, 1677. Engraving by David Loggan.

The college was based at three sites in the City of London near St Paul's Cathedral, before moving to Pall Mall East (overlooking Trafalgar Square), and then to its current location in Regent's Park.

The first Harveian Librarian was Christopher Merret, a fellow of the college and a friend of Harvey. He was set up with a lifetime appointment that compensated him with room and board and a small stipend. In 1666, the Great Fire of London destroyed many of the rooms and most of the books, so they tried to break the contract with Merret, but he fought them at the King's Court, claiming it was a lifetime appointment. He eventually lost the case, was expelled from the Fellowship, had to seek private lodgings and return the books he had rescued from the fire.

The college became the licensing body for medical books in the late seventeenth century, and sought to set new standards in learning through its own system of examinations. The college's tradition of examining continues to this day and it is still perhaps how the college is best known to the general public.

The Royal College of Physicians celebrated its 500-year anniversary in 2018.

== Membership, fellowship, and RCP roles ==
=== Membership ===
The MRCP(UK) postnominal is used by doctors who have passed the examinations for the Diploma of Membership of the Royal Colleges of Physicians of the United Kingdom, which are held jointly by all of the UK Royal Colleges of Physicians. Holders of the MRCP(UK) may also become "Collegiate Members" of the London College (using the additional post-nominal MRCP(Lond)) and/or of the other two UK colleges. Affiliate membership of the Royal College of Physicians is a similar level of membership as collegiate membership, but is awarded to senior doctors without MRCP(UK). Both Collegiate Members and Affiliate Members may be considered for advancement to fellowship of the college.

The college also has associate, medical student, and foundation doctor levels of membership.

=== Fellowship ===
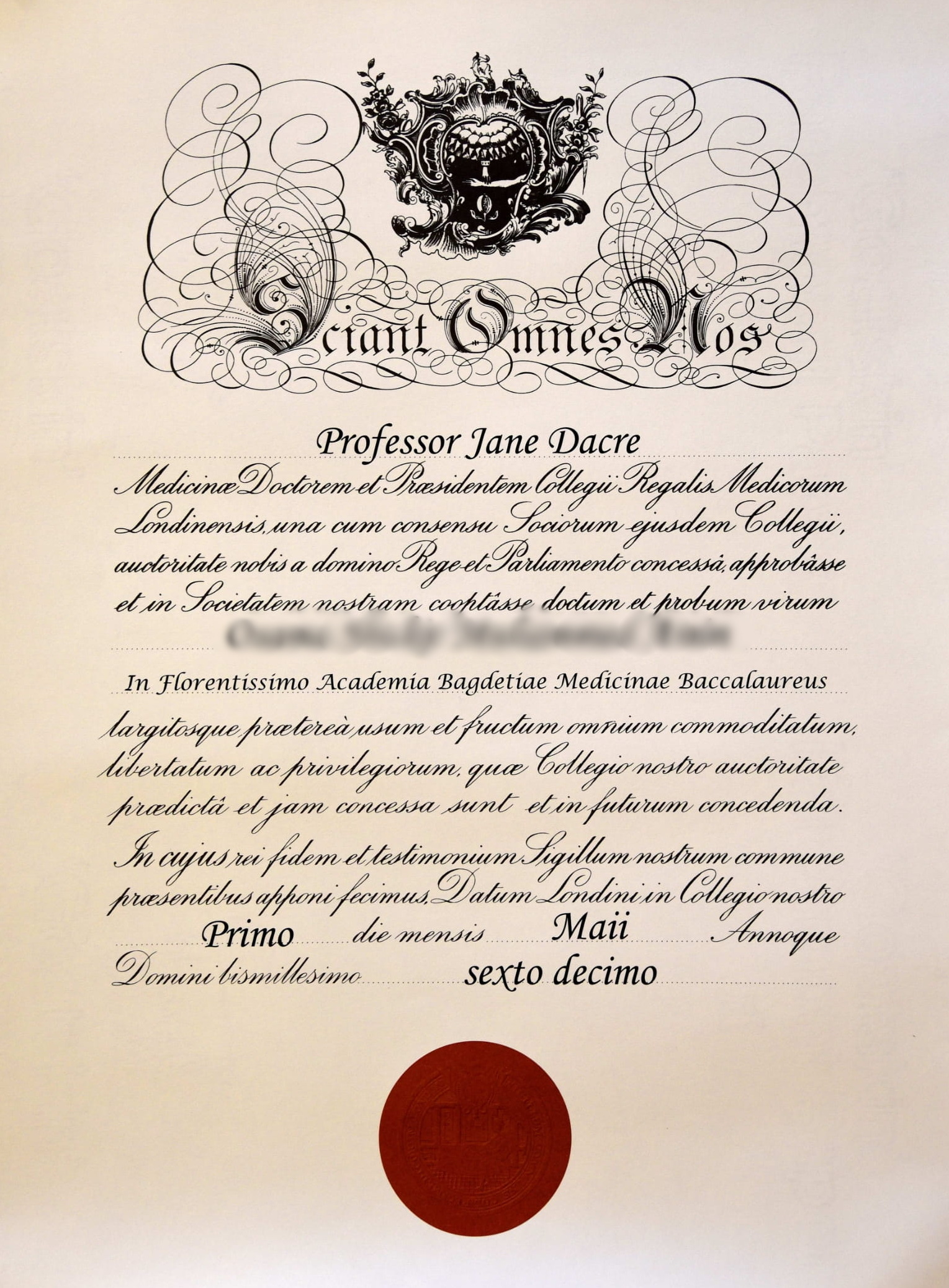
FRCP, the Fellowship diploma of the Royal College of Physicians

Fellows of the Royal College of Physicians (who use the post-nominal FRCP) are elected mostly from the general membership (collegiate or affiliate), but also occasionally from among the members of the more specialised faculties within the Royal Colleges of Physicians, e.g. Occupational Medicine (MFOM), Pharmaceutical Medicine (MFPM), and Forensic and Legal Medicine (MFLM), etc. There are also fellows who are elected de jure (usually medical experts from other countries) and honoris causa (dignitaries, members of the Royal Family, etc.).

Fellowship is an honour conferred by election, recognising senior physicians’ professional achievement and contributions to medicine; it is not obtained by passing a single examination. The RCP describes its fellows as senior doctors whose standout contributions are recognised, and notes that fellows have rights such as using the FRCP postnominal and proposing others for fellowship.

Comparable fellowships are also awarded by other UK Royal Colleges of Physicians (e.g. FRCP(Edin) and FRCP(Glasg)) through their own nomination and eligibility processes.

Holding an RCP fellowship does not in itself confer a licence to practise; medical registration and licensing in the UK are administered separately by the General Medical Council (GMC) under its eligibility requirements.

Physicians from the Royal College of Physicians published a series of works containing biographical entries of the fellows called Munk's Roll.

=== Censors ===
The role of censor was established in the RCP's founding charter in 1518.

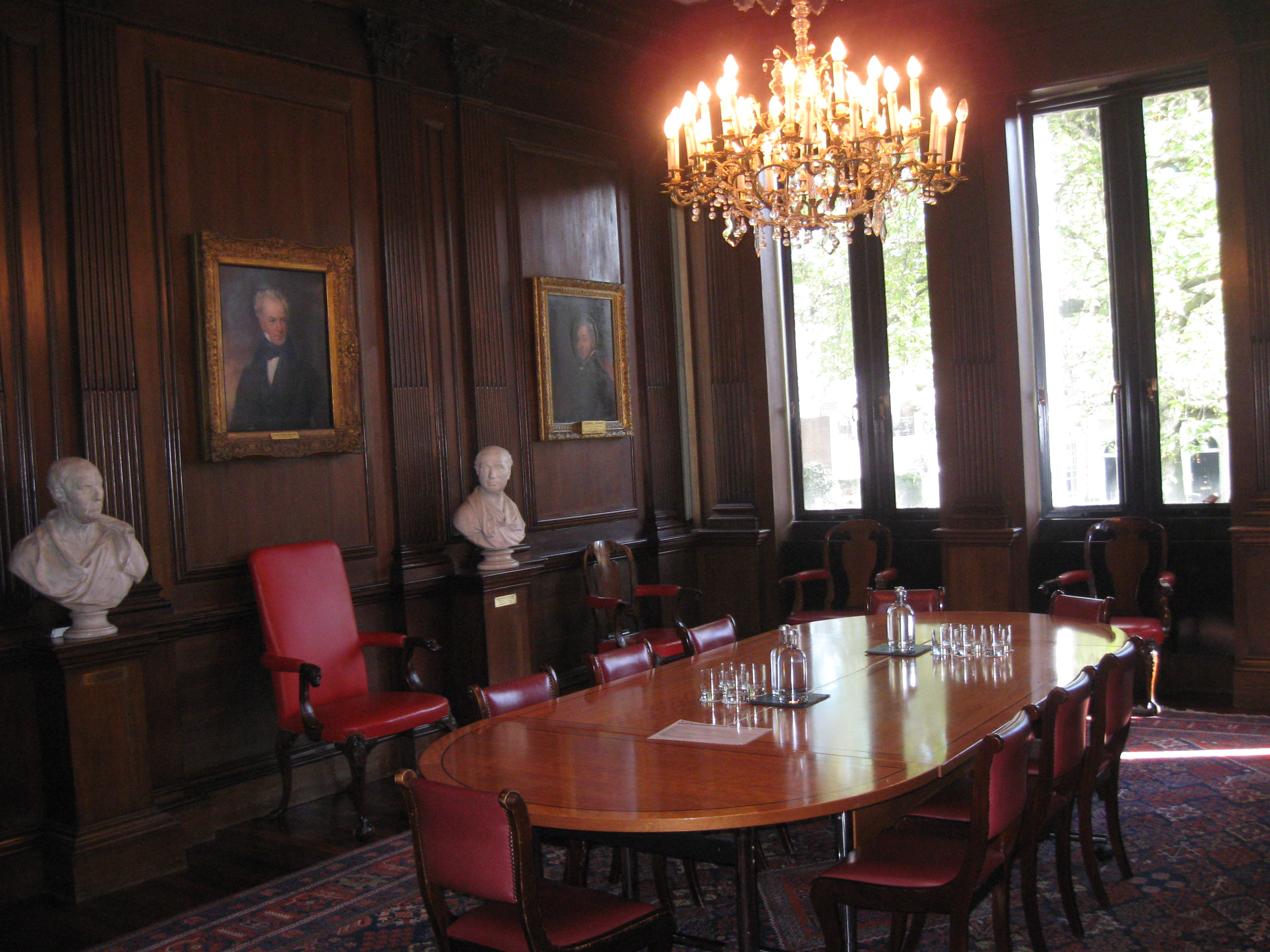
The Censors Room at The Royal College of Physicians

They acted as a regulatory and disciplinary committee, to prevent unqualified practitioners from practising as doctors, but have always been involved in the education, examinations and maintaining standards of medical practitioners.

Today, there are at least four censors as well as the education and training vice president, who is also known as the senior censor. Censors are present at all important meetings and lectures, including welcoming new members and fellows.

== Library ==
The library aims to support the learning and information needs of the members, students, and staff of the college. The unique collections may also used for research by members of the public. An enquiry service provides information on the current role and functions of the RCP as well as its history. The library holds books on a range of subjects including:

- history of medicine
- genealogy
- health and social policy
- medical education

=== Rare book collections ===
The Royal College of Physicians has had a library collection since its foundation in 1518, although most of the original books were destroyed during the Great Fire of London in 1666. The rare books and special collections are diverse in coverage, reflecting the collecting habits of earlier fellows and the need to provide the broad educational base considered suitable for physicians. The rare books are normally available to the general public, by appointment, Monday to Friday 10 am – 5 pm.

Books and journals—new and old—display a continuum of change and development in the RCP's specialties, as well as in the medical profession. Highlights include:

- approximately 130 books printed before 1502, including some of the earliest printings of the classical medical texts by Greek, Roman and Arabic doctors
- books belonging to and annotated by the Elizabethan astrologer and occultist John Dee
- approximately 3,000 books, dated up to 1688, in the Dorchester collection, on a variety of subjects including architecture, science and travel
- over 4,500 tracts from the 17th to the 19th century covering a wide range of subjects, both medical and scientific
- the Evan Bedford collection, which includes almost every significant text in the history of cardiology up to 1970

Highlights of the 20th-century collection include:

- books relating to the history of the RCP's specialties
- biographies of fellows and prominent figures in medicine
- books relating to the formation of the National Health Service (NHS) and its continuing history
- books relating to the history of hospitals in the UK
- books relating to medical ethics and the status and role of the physician
- every item published by the RCP, including reports and pamphlets.

The book collections are displayed in regularly changing exhibitions.

In December 2020 the college's Board of Trustees (BoT) discussed in detail the RCP's financial position, which, like so many charities, had been impacted significantly by the COVID-19 pandemic. All aspects of RCP activity had come under review and a range of cost reduction and income generation options considered, including the possible sale of non-medical books from its collection. The BoT recognised that this had caused concern for some quarters of the membership and agreed to delay such a sale for the immediate future.

== Museum collections ==
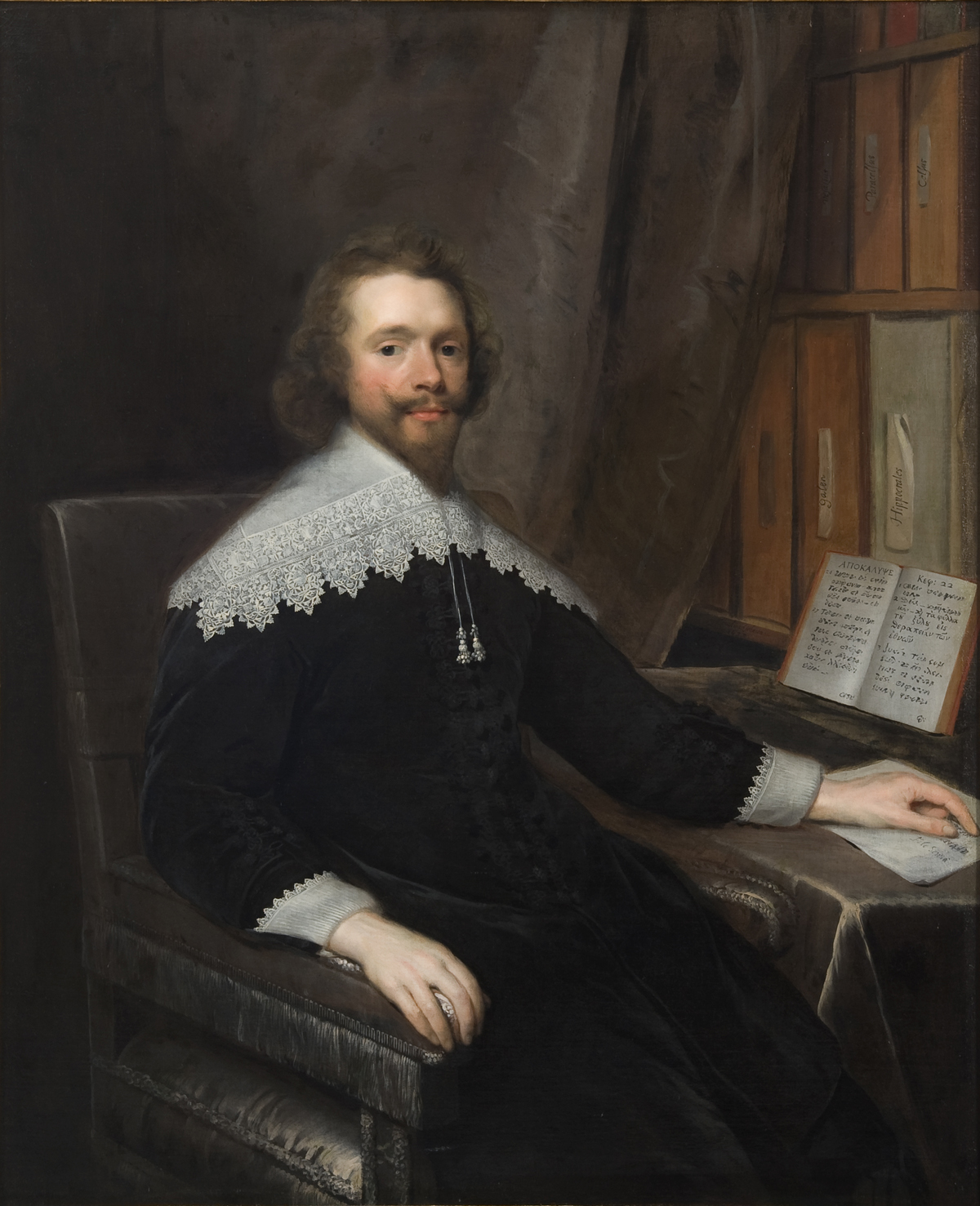
Portrait of a Physician in His Library by Cornelis Janssens van Ceulen, one of the significant portraits in the Royal College of Physicians' collection

The museum collections at the Royal College of Physicians relate to the history of the college, and the history of the Physician's profession. They help to place the history and development of medicine and health care in its widest context. The collections include: portraits, silver, medical instruments, the Symons Collection, commemorative medals and anatomical tables.

The collection of c. 250 portraits provides a pictorial and sculptural record of presidents, Fellows and other physicians associated with it from its foundation in 1518 to the present day. It includes pieces by well-known artists, such as a bust of Baldwin Hamey Junior (1600–1676) by Edward Pierce and one of Richard Mead (1673–1754) by Louis François Roubiliac. There are portraits, such as that of Richard Hale (1670–1728) by Jonathan Richardson. In 1964 a volume on the Portraits of the college was published by Gordon Wolstenholme in which they were described by David Piper.

The silver collection has few pieces pre-dating the Great Fire of London (1666) because of a robbery during the previous year. Baldwin Hamey's inkstand bell and William Harvey's whalebone demonstration rod, tipped with silver, are two that survive. Many pieces of silver are used to this day for formal occasions in the college. Special objects include the President's staff of office, the caduceus and the silver-gilt College mace.

The college also owns six 17th-century anatomical tables, probably made by drying and mounting the actual blood vessels and nerves of the human body onto blocks of wood and then varnishing them. They would have been used as a teaching aid for teaching anatomy, because it was difficult to obtain cadavers for dissection.

The Symons Collection of medical instruments is displayed within the college building. It began as a collection of objects relating to self-care in Georgian times and expanded to include items that would have been used by physicians when treating patients, mostly in the eighteenth and nineteenth centuries.

The collections can be searched via an online catalogue and items on display are open to the general public Monday to Friday 9 am – 5 pm. The Royal College of Physicians is a member of the London Museums of Health & Medicine.

== Archives ==
The archive collections date back to the foundation of the Royal College of Physicians in 1518 and include the original Royal charter granted by King Henry VIII. The activities of the college are preserved in official minutes and other institutional records dating from the 16th century to the present.

Over 200 collections of personal papers reflect the experiences of practitioners and patients over the last 500 years. These collections include items dating back to the 13th century which relate to the history of medicine and science in Europe.

In the 19th century, William Munk, a fellow with a keen interest in medical biography started collection information about all the physicians who had either been licensed by the college or became a member. After years of research the resulting biographies were compiled into 3 volumes which included everyone who was a member of, or licensed by the college up to 1825. These volumes, published between 1861 and 1878 were the start of a series, known as Munk's Roll after the original compiler. Later volumes focussed on fellows and the series is now online with regular updates ensuring there is a biography for every past fellow from 1518 to the present.

The archive continues to collect records that demonstrate the developing roles of physicians, including oral recordings of practitioners reflecting on their lives and careers. The collections can be searched via an online catalogue, and are available to the general public by appointment. The 'Voices of medicine' oral histories are available to listen to via the library catalogue.

== Facility ==
The college is located in St. Andrews Place, which is at the north end of the road running up the east side of Regent's Park, Park Square East. The college's previous headquarters, on Pall Mall East/Trafalgar Square, is now Canada House, part of the Canadian high commission in London. The college had a number of other locations prior to Pall Mall East, in the City of London.

Exterior of the Royal College of Physicians at St Andrews Place, London, United Kingdom.

The current College building was designed by architect Sir Denys Lasdun, opening in 1964 and has since been recognised as a building of national importance: it is a Grade I listed building, one of a very select band of post-war buildings sharing this distinction. Lasdun's use of mosaic clad concrete was extremely influential on many later public buildings. An interesting feature of the building was a 'Moving Wall', weighing five tons (5080 kg) and capable of being hydraulically lifted ten feet (3,000 mm) to unite or sub-divide a hall of sixty-two feet (19 m) width, which was the interior width of the building. The hydraulic equipment and the steel framework for the Moving Wall were produced by Merryweather & Sons Ltd of Greenwich, hydraulic engineers. Although better known for fire fighting equipment it was not the company's first installation of this kind.

== Publications ==
The college publishes two peer-reviewed medical journals. Clinical Medicine and Future Healthcare Journal. In addition, it publishes regular reports, clinical guidelines, policy papers and online resources. Occupational and Environmental Medicine is the official journal of the Faculty of Occupational Medicine.

Commentary is the membership magazine. It is published bimonthly.

== Faculties ==
The Royal College of Physicians hosts five training faculties: the Faculty of Forensic and Legal Medicine, the Faculty for Pharmaceutical Medicine, the Faculty of Occupational Medicine the Faculty of Public Health, and the Faculty of Sport and Exercise Medicine. The Faculty of Physician Associates is a former faculty which was established in 2015 and closed in 2024.

=== Forensic and Legal Medicine ===
The Faculty of Forensic and Legal Medicine (FFLM) was established as a faculty of the RCP in 2006 to develop and maintain the highest possible standards of competence and professional integrity in forensic and legal medicine. The specialty covers professionals working in three related disciplines: forensic practitioners (forensic physicians, forensic nurses and paramedics, forensic pathologists, sexual assault examiners, and child physical and sexual assault examiners); medico-legal advisers; and medically qualified coroners. The FFLM holds a number of exams for professionals working in Forensic and Legal Medicine. It is recognised as the authoritative body for the purpose of consultation in matters of educational or public interest concerning forensic and legal medicine.

=== Pharmaceutical Medicine ===
The Faculty of Pharmaceutical Medicine (FPM) of the royal colleges of physicians of the UK (Edinburgh, Glasgow and London) aims to advance the science and practice of pharmaceutical medicine by working to develop and maintain competence, ethics and integrity and the highest professional standards in the specialty for the benefit of the public.

=== Occupational Medicine ===
The Faculty of Occupational Medicine was inaugurated as a specialist faculty of the RCP in 1978. The FOM is the professional and educational body for occupational medicine in the UK and seeks to ensure the highest standards in the practice of occupational medicine.

=== Public health ===
The Faculty of Public Health (FPH) is a joint faculty of the three royal colleges of physicians of the United Kingdom (London, Edinburgh and Glasgow). It is a membership organisation for nearly 4,000 public health professionals across the UK and around the world. Its role is to improve the health and wellbeing of local communities and national populations.

=== Sport and Exercise Medicine ===
The Faculty of Sport and Exercise Medicine (FSEM) UK is the governing body for the specialty of sport and exercise medicine (SEM) in the UK. It is an intercollegiate faculty of the RCP and the Royal College of Surgeons of Edinburgh.

== Lecture series ==
The college holds an annual lecture, commonly referred to as the Lumleian Lectures, which were named in honour of Lord Lumley and established as part of the Lumleian Trust. The trust and lectures were established in 1582 by Richard Caldwell, a former president of the college. The subject matter of the lectures was initially in surgery, which was later changed to in medicine. The first lecture was given by Richard Forster, and the lectures continue to today.

Once a year, traditionally on St Luke's Day (18 October), a Fellow is appointed to deliver the Harveian Oration to the assembled college in memory of William Harvey. The oration seeks to honour the founders and benefactors of the college and encourage a spirit of experimentation amongst the members.

Other annual lectures are the Bradshaw Lecture, the Croonian Lecture, the Goulstonian Lecture, the Fitzpatrick Lecture, and the Milroy Lectures.

== Awards ==
The Bisset Hawkins Medal is a triennial award founded in 1899 in honour of Francis Bisset Hawkins, a fellow of the college, to recognise work done in the preceding ten years in advancing sanitary science or promoting public health.

The Baly Medal is a biennial award, founded by a gift from Frederick Daniel Dyster (1809?–93) received in 1866, confirmed by deed 1930 – in memory of William Baly: £400 to provide a gold medal for the person deemed to have most distinguished himself in the science of physiology, especially during the previous two years.

The Weber-Parkes Prize was founded in 1895 by German-born physician Sir Hermann Weber (1823–1918), who was consulting physician to the Royal National Hospital for Consumption at Ventnor on the Isle of Wight, and to the North London Consumption Hospital, as well as to the German Hospital in Dalston, London. Weber gave the college a donation of £3,000 to create a prize to be awarded triennially for the best essay on tuberculosis, in memory of his friend Edmund Parkes. The award was referred to as "The Weber-Parkes Prize and Medals" in an article in The BMJ in July 1895. The winner of the prize would receive £150 and a bronze medal, while the runner-up would receive an identical medal. The medals were described as being of great artistic merit. In 1909, the cash prize was raised to 150 guineas. Winners included St Clair Thomson in 1936, American physician Eugene L. Opie in 1945, Hugh Morriston Davies in 1954 and Jonathan Friedland in 2005.

== See also ==
- Alcohol Health Alliance UK
- List of presidents of the Royal College of Physicians
- Royal College of Physicians of Edinburgh
- Royal College of Physicians and Surgeons of Glasgow
