= Harveian Oration =

Lecture held at the Royal College of Physicians of London

The Harveian Oration is a yearly lecture held at the Royal College of Physicians of London. It was instituted in 1656 by William Harvey, discoverer of the systemic circulation. Harvey made financial provision for the college to hold an annual feast on St. Luke's Day (18 October) at which an oration would be delivered in Latin to praise the college's benefactors and to exhort the Fellows and Members of this college to search and study out the secrets of nature by way of experiment. Until 1865, the Oration was given in Latin, as Harvey had specified, and known as the Oratio anniversaria; but it was thereafter spoken in English. Many of the lectures were published in book form.

== Lecturers (incomplete list) ==
=== 1656–1700 ===
- 1656 Edward Emily
- 1657 Edmund Wilson
- 1659 Daniel Whistler
- 1660 Thomas Coxe
- 1661 Edward Greaves
- 1662 Charles Scarburgh
- 1663 Christopher Terne
- 1664 Nathan Paget
- 1665 Samuel Collins
- 1666–1678 No Orations due to rebuilding following the Great Fire of London.
- 1679 Thomas Millington
- 1680 Walter Charleton
- 1681 George Rogers
- 1682 Samuel Collins
- 1683 Nathaniel Hodges
- 1684 Thomas Alvey
- 1685–1687 No Oration
- 1688 Henry Paman
- 1689–1693 No Oration
- 1694 Charles Goodall
- 1695–1696 No Oration
- 1697 Samuel Garth
- 1698 No Oration
- 1699 Walter Harris
- 1700 No Oration

=== 1701–1800 ===
- 1701 Walter Charleton
- 1702 Walter Charleton
- 1703 No Oration
- 1704 Edward Hulse
- 1705 Walter Charleton
- 1706 Walter Charleton
- 1707 Walter Harris
- 1708 Josiah Clerk
- 1709 Charles Goodall
- 1710 No Oration
- 1711 George Colebrook
- 1712 No Oration
- 1713 Walter Harris
- 1714–1718 No Oration
- 1719 Thomas Pellett
- 1720 John Freind
- 1721 John Hawys
- 1722 Henry Plumptre
- 1723 Richard Mead, Status of Greek and Roman physicians
- 1724 Richard Hale
- 1725 Richard Tyson
- 1726 Walter Harris
- 1727 John Arbuthnot
- 1728 Charles Bale
- 1729 Pierce Dod
- 1730 No Oration
- 1731 Noel Broxholme
- 1732 Ralph Bouchier
- 1733 William Wood
- 1734 John Hollings, Status Humanæ Naturæ expositus in Oratione coram Medicis Londinensibus habita
- 1735 Edward Wilmot
- 1736 Matthew Lee
- 1737 James Monro
- 1738 John Newington
- 1739 Frank Nicholls
- 1740 Simon Burton
- 1741 Robert Hopwood
- 1742 Benjamin Hoadly
- 1743 Robert Bankes
- 1744 Ambrose Dawson
- 1745 Charles Cotes
- 1746 William Battie
- 1747 James Hawley
- 1748 Thomas Lawrence
- 1749 Charles Feake
- 1750 William Heberden
- 1751 William Browne
- 1752 Edward Milward
- 1753 William Coxe
- 1754 John Thomas Batt
- 1755 Robert Taylor, smallpox inoculation
- 1756 Richard Conyers
- 1757 John Monro
- 1758 Anthony Askew
- 1759 Mark Akenside
- 1760 Richard Brocklesby
- 1761 George Baker
- 1762 Anthony Askew
- 1763 Charlton Wollaston
- 1764 William Cadogan
- 1765 Thomas Heald
- 1766 Wilkinson Blanshard
- 1767 No Oration (Licentiate rebellion)
- 1768 Richard Warren
- 1769 Swithen Adee
- 1770 Anthony Relhan
- 1771 John Green
- 1772 John Lewis Petit
- 1773 John Turton
- 1774 Richard Jebb
- 1775 Donald Monro
- 1776 Henry Revell Reynolds
- 1777 Richard Wright
- 1778 Lucas Pepys
- 1779 John Burges
- 1780 John Rawlinson
- 1781 Richard Budd
- 1782 Francis Milman
- 1783 Isaac Pennington
- 1784 John Parsons
- 1785 James Hervey
- 1786 David Pitcairn
- 1787 Francis Riollay
- 1788 Martin Wall
- 1789 James Robertson Barclay
- 1790 John Ash
- 1791 George Fordyce
- 1792 William Cadogan
- 1793 John Carmichael Smyth
- 1794 John Latham
- 1795 John Mayo
- 1796 William Saunders
- 1797 Robert Bourne
- 1798 Matthew Baillie
- 1799 Thomas Monro
- 1800 Henry Halford

=== 1801–1900 ===
- 1801 Edward Roberts
- 1802 Henry Ainslie
- 1803 George Paulet Morris
- 1804 Arthur Daniel Stone
- 1805 Sir Christopher Pegge
- 1806 Christopher Robert Pemberton
- 1807 Paggen William Mayo
- 1808 Richard Powell
- 1809 William Heberden the Younger
- 1810 Robert Willis
- 1811
- 1812 Dr Ash
- 1813
- 1814 Charles Gower
- 1815 William George Maton
- 1816 James Haworth
- 1817 George Smith Gibbes
- 1818 William Lambe
- 1819 John Johnstone
- 1820 Charles Price
- 1821 George Gilbert Currey
- 1822 Thomas Turner
- 1823
- 1824
- 1825 Henry Halford
- 1826 Pelham Warren
- 1827 Robert Bree
- 1828 John Cooke
- 1829 Clement Hue
- 1830 John Bright
- 1831 No Oration due to illness
- 1832 James Tattersall
- 1833 John Ayrton Paris
- 1834 Edward Thomas Monro
- 1835 Henry Halford
- 1836 John Kidd
- 1837 John Haviland
- 1838 William Newbigging
- 1839 Peter Mere Latham
- 1840 Charles Badham
- 1841 Thomas Mayo
- 1842 No Oration
- 1843 William King
- 1844 James Adey Ogle
- 1845 Charles Daubeny
- 1846 John Elliotson, on hypnotism
- 1847 Henry Herbert Southey,Dr. Ramadge and the Harveian Oration
- 1848 Francis Hawkins
- 1849 John Carr Badeley
- 1850 James Arthur Wilson
- 1851 John Spurgin
- 1852 Richard Formby
- 1853 No Oration
- 1854 James Alderson
- 1856 George Hamilton Roe
- 1857 James Copland
- 1858 George Edward Wilmot Wood
- 1859 Charles James Berridge Aldis
- 1860 William Emmanuel Page
- 1861 Richard Henry Goolden
- 1862 No Oration
- 1863 Alexander John Sutherland
- 1864 Robert Lee (Last in Latin)
- 1865 Henry Wentworth Acland
- 1866 George Edward Paget
- 1867 James Alderson
- 1868 No Oration
- 1869 George Owen Rees
- 1870 William Withey Gull Attack on the Theory of Vitality.
- 1871 Thomas King Chambers Restorative Medicine.
- 1872 Arthur Farre Analysis of Harvey's Exercises on generation.
- 1873 George Rolleston
- 1874 Charles West
- 1875 William Guy
- 1876 William Jenner
- 1877 Edward Henry Sieveking
- 1878 John Scott Burdon-Sanderson
- 1879 Samuel Wilks
- 1880 John William Ogle
- 1881 Andrew Whyte Barclay
- 1882 George Johnson, Cesalpino and Harvey
- 1883 Samuel Osborne Habershon The advancement of science by experimental research.
- 1884 John Russell Reynolds
- 1885 Richard Quain, History and Progress of Medicine
- 1886 Frederick William Pavy
- 1887 William H. Stone
- 1888 Peter Wallwork Latham, Blood Changes in Disease
- 1889 James Edward Pollock, Progress of Science and Sanitation
- 1890 James Andrew, Conditions of the Pulmonary Circulation
- 1891 William Howship Dickinson, Harvey in Ancient and Modern Medicine
- 1892 John Henry Bridges, Harvey and his successors
- 1893 Philip Henry Pye-Smith, Pathology as the Basis of Rational Medicine
- 1894 Thomas Lauder Brunton, Modern Developments of Harvey's Work
- 1895 William Selby Church, The Rise of Physiology in England
- 1896 Joseph Frank Payne, Harvey and Galen
- 1897 William Roberts, On Science and Modern Civilisation
- 1898 Dyce Duckworth, The Influence of Character and Right Judgment in Medicine
- 1899 George Vivian Poore
- 1900 Thomas Clifford Allbutt, Science and Medieval Thought

=== 1901–2000 ===
- 1901 Norman Moore
- 1902 David Ferrier, The Heart and Nervous System
- 1903 William Henry Allchin, On the Study of Structure in Relation to Function
- 1904 Richard Caton, I-Em-Hotep and Ancient Egyptian Medicine: Prevention of Valvular Disease
- 1905 Frederick T. Roberts
- 1906 William Osler, The Growth of Truth as Illustrated in the Discovery of the Circulation of the Blood
- 1907 Frederick Taylor, "The need of research in medicine "
- 1908 Joseph Arderne Ormerod, On Heredity in relation to Disease
- 1909 George Henry Savage, On Experimental Psychology and Hypnotism
- 1910 Horatio Bryan Donkin, On Inheritance of Mental Characters
- 1911 C. Theodore Williams, On Old and New Views on the Treatment of Consumption
- 1912 Sir James Goodhart, 1st Baronet, The Passing of Morbid Anatomy
- 1913 John Mitchell Bruce, The Influence of Harvey's Work in the Development of the Doctrine of Infection and Immunity
- 1914 Sir Richard Powell,Advances in Knowledge Regarding the Circulation and Attributes of the Blood Since Harvey's time
- 1915 Sidney Coupland, Observations on the Statistics in Regard to Mental Disorders and their Occurrence
- 1916 Thomas Barlow, Harvey, The Man and The Physician
- 1917 Robert Saundby, Harvey's Work Considered in Relation to Scientific Knowledge and University Education in his Time
- 1918 Percy Kidd, On the Doctrine of Consumption in Harvey's Time and Today
- 1919 Raymond Crawfurd, On Forerunners of Harvey in Antiquity
- 1920 Frederick Andrewes, On the Birth and Growth of Science in Medicine
- 1921 Herbert R. Spencer, On William Harvey, Obstetric Physician and Gynaecologist
- 1922 Thomas Hancock Arnold Chaplin, On Medicine in the Century before Harvey
- 1923 Ernest Henry Starling, The Wisdom of the Body
- 1924 Archibald Edward Garrod, The Debt of Science to Medicine
- 1925 Frederick Mott, On Heredity in Relation to Mental Disease
- 1926 John Bradford, On the Debt of Medicine to the Experimental Method of Harvey
- 1927 William Hale-White, Bacon, Gilbert and Harvey
- 1928 Sir Humphry Rolleston, Bt, Cardio-Vascular Diseases Since Harvey's Discovery
- 1929 Wilmot Herringham, The England of Harvey
- 1930 John Beresford Leathes, The Birth of Chemical Biology
- 1931 Robert Hutchison, Harvey: The Man, his Method, and his Message for us today
- 1932 George Newman, The Debt of Preventative Medicine to Harvey and the College of Physicians
- 1933 Thomas Lewis, Clinical Science
- 1934 James Collier, Inventions and the Outlook in Neurology
- 1935 Henry Hallett Dale, Some Epochs in Medical Research
- 1936 Walter Langdon-Brown, The Background to Harvey
- 1937 Arthur Frederick Hurst, The Time Has Come
- 1938 Edward Mellanby, The State and Medical Research
- 1939 Robert Arthur Young, The Pulmonary Circulation—Before and After Harvey
- 1940 No Oration due to bombing
- 1941 Farquhar Buzzard, Reconstruction in the practice of medicine (Oration not delivered but published only).
- 1942 William Wilson Jameson, War and the Advancement of Social Medicine
- 1943 William Hume, The Physician in War – In Harvey's Time and After
- 1944 Edmund Spriggs, Harveian Method in Literature (Delivered in Manchester)
- 1945 John Parkinson, Rheumatic Fever and Heart Disease
- 1946 Maurice Cassidy, Coronary Disease
- 1947 Charles Ernest Lakin, Our founders and benefactors
- 1948 Francis Martin Rouse Walshe, The Structure of Medicine and its Place amongst the Sciences
- 1949 Geoffrey Marshall, Individuality in Medicine
- 1950 Leonard Parsons, The Influence of Harvey and his Contemporaries on Paediatrics
- 1951 Archibald Gray, Dermatology from the Time of Harvey
- 1952 Charles McMoran Wilson, On Credulity
- 1953 George Graham, The Value of Physiology in Medicine
- 1954 Charles Symonds, The Circle of Willis
- 1955 John Charles, The Contrivance of Collegiation
- 1956 J. Crighton Bramwell, Practice, Teaching and Research
- 1957 Donald Hunter, Harvey and his Contemporaries
- 1958 Geoffrey Keynes, Harvey through John Aubrey's eyes
- 1959 Russell Brain, William Harvey, Neurologist
- 1960 Francis Richard Fraser, The Challenge to the Medical Profession
- 1961 Arthur Peregrine Thomson, The Consummation of William Harvey
- 1962 Harold Himsworth, Society and the Advancement of Natural Knowledge
- 1963 Aubrey Lewis, Medicine and the Affections of the Mind
- 1964 George Pickering, Physician and Scientist
- 1965 Theodore Fox, Purposes of Medicine
- 1966 MacDonald Critchley, The Divine Banquet of the Brain
- 1967 Robert Platt, Medical Science: Master or Servant?
- 1968 Davis Evan Bedford, Harvey's Third Circulation. De Circulo Sanguinis in Corde
- 1969 Ronald V. Christie, Medical Education and the State
- 1970 Henry Cohen, 1st Baron Cohen of Birkenhead, On the Motion of Blood in the Veins
- 1971 Leslie J. Witts, The Medical Professorial Unit
- 1972 Thomas C. Hunt, Digestive Disease – the Changing Scene
- 1973 Charles Edward Newman, The Art of De Motu Cordis
- 1974 Charles Stuart-Harris, The Contribution of Virology to Contemporary Medicine
- 1975 John McMichael, A Transition in Cardiology: the Mackenzie Lewis Era
- 1976 Ronald Bodley Scott, The Admirable Faculties of the Blood
- 1977 Douglas Black, Cui Bono?
- 1978 John Richardson, Harvey's Exhortation
- 1979 Cyril Clarke, Nature the Old Nurse
- 1980 Francis Avery Jones, The Emergence of Gastroenterology
- 1981 John Stokes, Foreign Affairs
- 1982 Sir Richard Doll, Prospects for Prevention
- 1983 Richard Bayliss, Thyroid Disease as the Expression of Autoimmune Disorder
- 1984 Anthony Clifford Dornhorst, Sharing the Secrets
- 1985 Dame Sheila Sherlock, Virus Hepatitis
- 1986 Allan George Williams Whitfield, Royal Physicians
- 1987 Sir James Gowans, Prospects for Medical Research
- 1988 Paul E. Polani, The Impact of Genetics on Medicine
- 1989 Sir Christopher Booth, A Clinician in Search of the Soluble
- 1990 Lord John Nicholas Walton, Method in Medicine
- 1991 Sir Raymond Hoffenberg, The science and cunning of physick: physicians, patients and politics in the 1990s
- 1992 Sir J. D. Wetherall, The role of nature and nurture in common diseases: Garrod's legacy
- 1993 Sir Colin Dollery, Medicine and the Pharmacological Revolution
- 1994 Dame Margaret Turner-Warwick, The Marvel of the Lung and Human Responsibility – A Great Contempt of God's Good Gifts?
- 1995 John D. Swales, The Growth of Medical Science: The Lessons of Malthus
- 1996 Sir Walter Bodmer, The Somatic Evolution of Cancer
- 1997 Sir John Grimley Evans, A Correct Compassion: the Medical Response to an Ageing Society
- 1998 Sir Donald Acheson, Equality of Health: Dream or Reality
- 1999 Sir Brian Jarman, The Quality of Care in Hospitals
- 2000 Leslie Turnberg, Baron Turnberg,Science, Society and the Perplexed Physician

=== 2001–present ===
- 2001 David Warrell, "To search and Studdy out the secrett of Tropical Diseases by way of Experiment"
- 2002 Sir Cyril Chantler The Second Greatest benefit to Mankind?
- 2003 Sir Paul Nurse, The Great Ideas of Biology
- 2004 Sir Keith Peters, Exceptional Matters
- 2005 Sir Colin Blakemore, In Celebration of Cerebration
- 2006 Sir Michael Marmot, Health in an unequal world – social circumstances, biology and disease
- 2007 Sir Mark Brian Pepys, Science and Serendipity
- 2008 Sir Michael David Rawlins, De Testimonio: On the evidence for decisions about the use of therapeutic interventions
- 2009 Sir Leszek Borysiewicz, Prevention is better than cure
- 2010 Sir John Bell, Redefining Disease
- 2011 Iona Heath, Divided we fail
- 2012 Sir Richard Peto, Halving premature death
- 2013 Dame Kay Davies, The era of genomic medicine
- 2014 Sir John Gurdon, Stem cells and cell replacement
- 2015 Sir Mark Walport, Medicine, science and values
- 2016 Sir Stephen O'Rahilly, Some observations on the causes and consequences of obesity
- 2017 Chris Whitty Triumphs and challenges in a world shaped by medicine
- 2018 Mary Dixon-Woods Improving quality and safety in health care
- 2019 Sir John Burn Prediction and prevention in the genomic era
- 2020 Peter J. Ratcliffe, Elucidation of molecular oxygen-sensing mechanisms in human cells: implications for medicine
- 2021 Jonathan Van-Tam, Moving forwards, understanding backwards: respiratory virus vaccines, therapeutics, and public health policy
- 2022 Dame Anne Johnson, Pandemic HIV and its legacy for medicine and global health
- 2023 Sir Patrick Vallance, The importance of integration – some observations from the clinic, academia, industry and government
- 2024 Avan Aihie Sayer, From bench to bedside and beyond: new horizons for translational ageing research
- 2025 Professor John Feehally, Nephrology – an exciting journey from birth to maturity

== See also ==
- Bradshaw Lecture
- Fitzpatrick Lecture
- Goulstonian Lecture
- Hunterian Oration
- Lumleian Lectures
- Milroy Lectures
