= List of presidents of the Royal Society of Medicine =

The president of the Royal Society of Medicine (RSM) is the head of the Royal Society of Medicine.

The presidents were elected biennially by the Fellows of the Society. In 2014 the charter changed. The presidents are now elected every three years.

The president oversees the running of the Society and chairs its council meetings.

== List of presidents ==
=== 1907-2000 ===
Presidents of the Royal Society of Medicine 1907–2000
Years in office	Name	Notes	Image
1907–1910	Sir William Selby Church, 1st Baronet	First president of the RSM in 1907, Church had chaired the preceding two years of negotiations to form the RSM.	
1910–1912	Sir Henry Morris, 1st Baronet		
1912–1914	Sir Francis Champneys	Obstetrician, elected president in 1912, and in the same year supported Sir William Osler in the founding of the History of Medicine Section.	
1914–1916	Sir Frederick Taylor, 1st Baronet		
1916–1918	Sir Rickman Godlee		
1918–1920	Sir Humphry Rolleston		
1920–1922	Sir John Bland-Sutton		
1922–1924	Sir William Hale-White		
1924–1926	St Clair Thomson		
1926–1928	Sir James Berry		
1928–1930	Bertrand Dawson, 1st Viscount Dawson of Penn		
1930–1932	Thomas Watts-Eden		
1932–1934	Vincent Warren Low		
1934–1936	Sir Robert Hutchison, 1st Baronet		
1936–1938	Sir John Herbert Parsons		
1938–1940	Sir William Girling Ball		
1940–1942	Sir Archibald Montague Henry Gray	Gray was a dermatologist who in 1913 became secretary to the dermatology section at the RSM. Between 1920 and 1924 he was the RSM's honorary secretary, and subsequently was appointed honorary treasurer.	
1942–1944	Sir Henry Letheby Tidy		
1944–1946	Sir Gordon Gordon-Taylor		
1946–1948	Sir Maurice Cassidy		
1948–1950	Sir Henry Hallett Dale		
1950–1952	Alfred Webb-Johnson, 1st Baron Webb-Johnson		
1952–1954	Sir Francis Walshe		
1954–1956	Sir William Gilliatt		
1956–1958	Sir Clement Price Thomas		
1958–1960	Sir Geoffrey Marshall		
1960–1962	Edgar Adrian, 1st Baron Adrian		
1962–1964	Sir Terence Cawthorne		
1964–1966	Henry Cohen, 1st Baron Cohen of Birkenhead		
1966–1967	Arthur Porritt, Baron Porritt		
1967–1969	Sir Hector MacLennan		
1969–1971	Sir John Samuel Richardson		
1971–1973	Sir Hedley Atkins		
1973–1975	Sir John Stallworthy		
1975–1977, 1978	(acting) Sir Gordon Wolstenholme		
1977–1978	Sir John Vivian Dacie		
1978–1980	Sir Rodney Smith, Baron Smith		
1980–1982	Sir John Stallworthy		
1982–1984	Sir James Watt		
1984–1986	John Walton, Baron Walton of Detchant		
1986–1988	Sir Gordon Robson		
1988–1990	Sir Christopher Booth		
1990–1992	Sir David Innes Williams		
1992–1994	Sir George Pinker		
1994–1996	Sir Donald Harrison		
1996–1998	Sir Christopher Paine		
1998–2000	Lord Soulsby of Swaffham		

=== 2000–2026 ===
Presidents of the Royal Society of Medicine 2000–2023
Years in office	Name	Notes	Image
2000–2002	Dame Deirdre Hine		
2002–2004	Sir Barry Jackson		
2004–2006	Sir John Lilleyman		
2006–2008	Ilora Finlay, Baroness Finlay of Llandaff		
2008–2010	Robin C. N. Williamson		
2010–2012	Dame Parveen Kumar		
2012–2014	Sir Michael Rawlins		
2014–2017	Babulal Sethia		
2017–2020	Sir Simon Wessely		
2020–2024	Roger Kirby		
2024-	Gillian Leng	4th female president and 109th overall.	
