= John Bright (disambiguation) =

John Bright (1811–1889) was a British radical and liberal statesman.

John Bright may also refer to:

== Arts and entertainment ==
- John Bright (screenwriter) (1908–1989), American journalist and screenwriter
- John Bright (costume designer) (born 1940), British costume designer
- John Bright, a character in the TV series Silk

== Politics and law ==
- Sir John Bright, 1st Baronet (1619–1688), English soldier and member of parliament
- John M. Bright (1817–1911), U.S. representative from Tennessee
- John Albert Bright (1848–1924), British Liberal Unionist politician
- John Fulmer Bright (1877–1923), mayor of Richmond, Virginia
- John Bright (judge) (1884–1948), U.S. federal judge

== Others ==
- John Bright (physician) (1783–1870), English physician
- Johnny Bright (baseball) (1888–1908), American baseball player
- John Bright (biblical scholar) (1908–1995), American biblical scholar
- Johnny Bright (1930–1983), American football player in the Canadian Football League
