= John Berkenhout =

English physician, naturalist and writer (1726-1791)

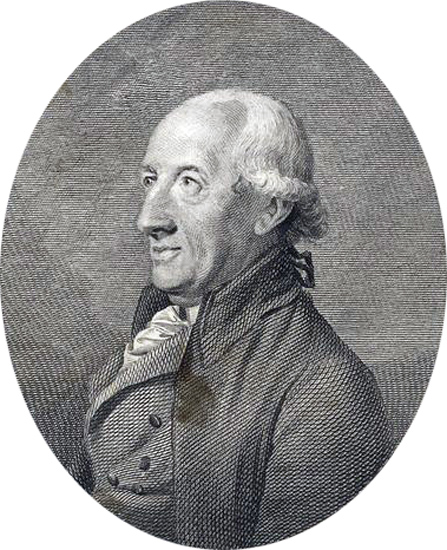
- Born: 8 July 1726
- Died: 3 April 1791 (aged 64)

John Berkenhout (8 July 1726 – 3 April 1791) was an English physician,

== Life ==
Berkenhout was born about 1730 at Leeds, the son of John Berkenhout Snr, a Dutch merchant who had settled in Yorkshire, and Anne Kitchingman. He was educated at Leeds Grammar School. His father intended him for a commercial career, and sent him to Germany to study languages. After spending some years in Germany he accompanied some English noblemen on a tour through Europe. On returning to Berlin he stayed with his father's relative Baron von Bielfeld.

Berkenhout became a cadet in a Prussian infantry regiment, where he was promoted to the rank of ensign and then captain. In 1756, at the start of the Seven Years' War, he left the Prussian service, and received a commission in an English regiment.

In 1760 he entered Edinburgh University as a medical student. From Edinburgh he went to the University of Leyden, where he took his degree of doctor of physic (medicine) on 13 May 1765. On his return to England he settled at Isleworth in Middlesex, It is stated in David Elisha Davy's 'Suffolk Collections' (xc. 403) that he practised for some time as a physician at Bury St Edmunds.

In 1778 Berkenhout was sent by the government with the Carlisle Peace Commission to America, quite covertly. The Continental Congress would not allow the Commission to go beyond New York; but Berkenhout managed to reach Philadelphia. He knew Arthur Lee, and through him contacted Richard Henry Lee. Suspicion arose in September that he was corrupting leading citizens; and he was detained and questioned, and thrown into prison. There Timothy Matlack and Benjamin Rush visited him, and verbal fencing ensued. In the end Berkenhout was paroled, and rejoined the commissioners at New York on 19 September; but the negotiations of the Carlisle Commission were dead. He came back to England, and was rewarded with a pension for his services.

Berkenhout died on 3 April 1791 at Besselsleigh near Oxford.

== Works ==
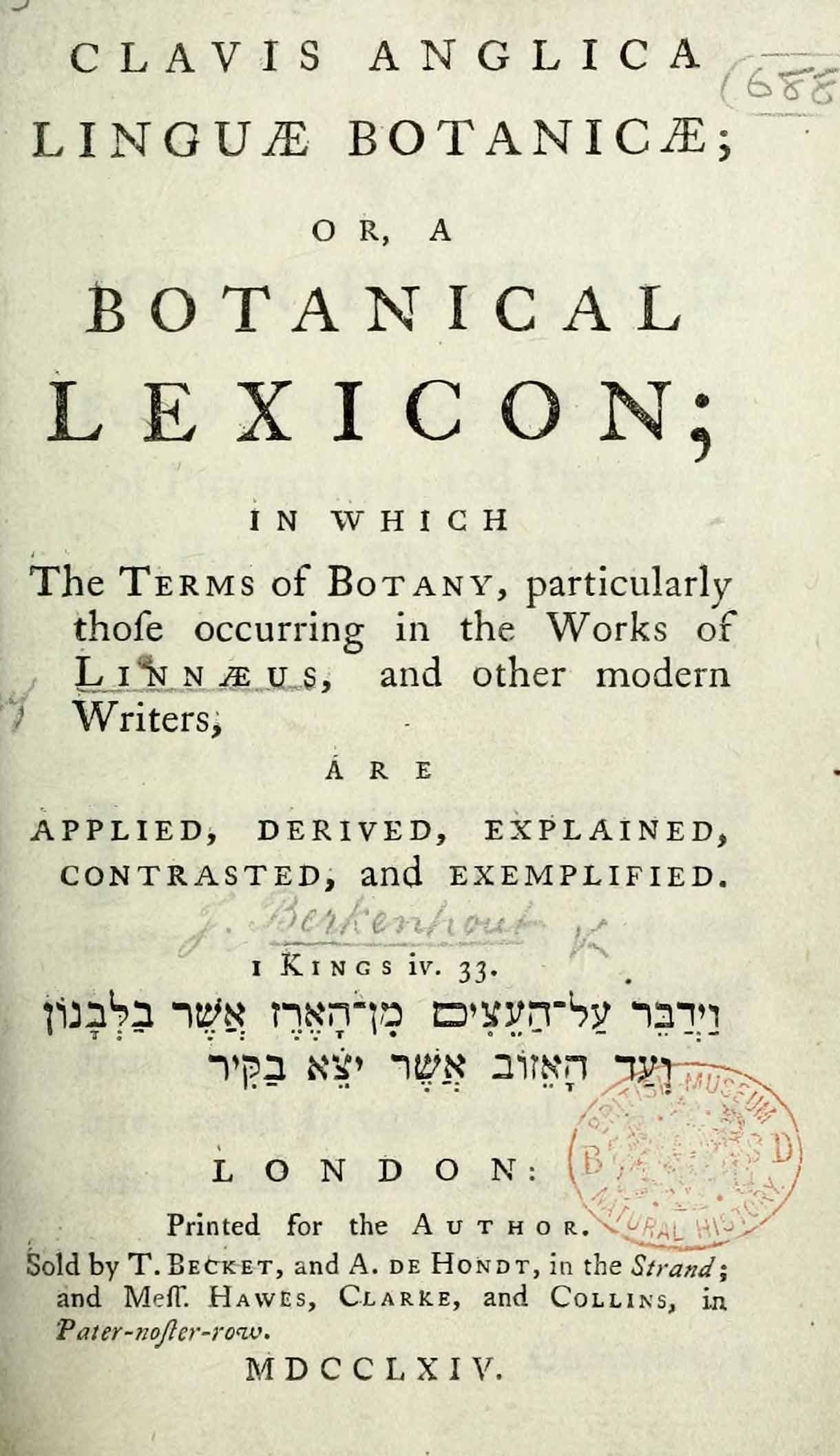
Clavis anglica linguae botanicae, 2nd edition, 1764

While a student at Edinburgh Berkenhout published in 1762 a botanical lexicon, Clavis Anglica Linguæ Botanicæ Linnæi, second edition 1764, and third edition 1766. For his M.D. he wrote Dissertatio Medica inauguralis de Podagra, dedicated on publication to Baron de Bielfeld. In 1766 he published Pharmacopoeia Medici.

In 1769 appeared the first volume of Berkenhout's Outlines of the Natural History of Great Britain; the second volume followed in 1770, and the third in 1771. It was republished in 1773 (three volumes), and a revised edition in two volumes appeared in 1788 as A Synopsis of the Natural History of Great Britain. In his publication (1771) William Cadogan's "Dissertation on the Gout" was Examined and Refuted.

In these works Berkenhout named the brown rat as the Norway Rat ("Rattus norvegicus"), not Linnaeus as is often claimed.

Berkenhout's major work was Biographia Literaria, or a Biographical History of Literature, containing the lives of English, Scotch, and Irish authors, from the dawn of letters in these kingdoms to the present time, chronologically and classically arranged (1777, first volume only). In the preface he acknowledged his debt to George Steevens for the lives of poets. Steevens in fact used the work to put into circulation one of his hoaxes, a forged letter purporting to be from George Peele.

In 1780 Berkenhout published Lucubrations on Ways and Means, a proposal on the imposition of taxes. Some of the suggestions in it were adopted by Lord North, others subsequently by William Pitt the Younger. His Essay on the Bite of a Mad Dog appeared in 1783; Symptomatology in 1784. Berkenhout's last work was Letters on Education to his Son at the University, 1790. In it he commented on the system of fagging in public schools.

Berkenhout also published Treatise on Hysterical and Hypochondriacal Diseases (1777), from the French of Pierre Pomme. In 1779 he edited a revised edition of John Campbell's Lives of the Admirals. He translated from Swedish, as Letters from an Old Man to a Young Prince (1756), Count Carl Gustaf Tessin's letters to the future Gustavus III of Sweden. Richard Linnecar dedicated his Strictures on Freemasonry to Berkenhout.

=== Publications ===
- Clavis anglica linguae botanicae (in Latin) (1 ed.). Edinburgh. 1762.
  - Clavis anglica linguae botanicae (in Latin) (2 ed.). London: Thomas Becket & Peter Abraham De Hondt. 1764.
- Outlines of the Natural History of Great Britain and Ireland (1769)
- Synopsis of the Natural History of Great Britain and Ireland (1789)
- First lines of the theory and practice of philosophical chemistry. London: Cadell, 1788
- A volume of letters from Dr. Berkenhout to his son at the university. London: Cadell 1790

== Notes ==
Attribution

This article incorporates text from a publication now in the public domain: Stephen, Leslie, ed. (1885). "Berkenhout, John". Dictionary of National Biography. Vol. 4. London: Smith, Elder & Co.
