= Josiah Clerk =

Josiah Clerk, M.D. (1639–1714) was an English physician, briefly president of the College of Physicians.

== Life ==
Clerk was matriculated as a pensioner of Peterhouse, Cambridge, in December 1656, and took the two degrees in medicine, M.B. in 1661, M.D. on 3 July 1666. He was admitted a candidate of the College of Physicians on 26 June 1671, a fellow on 29 July 1675, and was appointed censor in 1677 and 1692. On the death of Sir Thomas Witherley he was named elect on 16 April 1694, delivered the Harveian oration in 1708, was consiliarius in 1707, 1709, 1710, 1711, and 1712, and was elected to the presidency, void by the death of Dr. Edward Browne. On 13 September 1708, he was re-elected at the general election of officers on the 30th of the same month.

Clerk, who was old and ill, was unable to act as president. He resigned on 18 December, and Charles Goodall was appointed on 23 December 1708. He had been chosen treasurer on 16 April 1708, and retained that office as long as he lived. Clerk died at his house in Fenchurch Street in the autumn of 1714, in the seventy-fifth year of his age. In the annals of the college cited by William Munk the date of Clerk's death is given as 8 December, which is erroneous. His will was proved on 14 October. He desired 'to be decently, tho' very privately, buried by night in the vault in St. Olave Hart Street Church, where my honoured mother and my children lye, if it may be done with conveniency.' By his wife Abigail, who survived him, he left a daughter Elizabeth, married to Richard Wilshaw. Clerk's portrait is at the college.
