= Richard Tyson (physician, 1730–1784) =

English physician

- Born: 1730; London
- Died: 9 August 1784 (aged 53–54)
- Occupation: Physician

Richard Tyson (1730 – 9 August 1784) was an English physician.

== Biography ==
Tyson was the son of Richard Tyson, physician, and great-nephew of Edward Tyson. He was born in 1730 in the parish of St. Dionis Backchurch in the city of London. He matriculated at Oriel College, Oxford, 6 April 1747, and thence graduated B.A. 13 October 1750, M.A. 5 July 1753, M.B. 30 April 1756, and M.D. 15 January 1760. He was elected a fellow of the Royal College of Physicians of London, 30 September 1761, was censor in 1763, 1768, 1773, and 1776, and registrar from 1774 to 1780. He was elected physician to St. Bartholomew's Hospital on 5 Feb. 1762. He died on 9 August 1784.
