= Edward Poulton =

Edward Poulton may refer to:

- Edward Bagnall Poulton, British evolutionary biologist
- Edward L. Poulton, British trade unionist
- Edward Palmer Poulton, English physician and physiologist
