= Walter Harris (physician) =

English physician

- Born: 1647; Gloucester
- Died: 1 August 1732 (aged 84–85); London
- Occupation: Physician

Walter Harris (1647 – 1 August 1732) was an English physician.

== Biography ==
Harris was born in Gloucester in 1647. He was a scholar of Winchester College, and thence went to New College, Oxford, of which society he was elected a fellow in 1666. He took his B.A. degree on 10 October 1670. Soon after he joined the church of Rome, resigned his fellowship, and went to study medicine in France. He graduated M.D. at Bourges on 20 July 1675, and settled in London in 1676. Three years later, during the commotions about a popish plot, he published ‘A Farewell to Popery,’ 1679, and soon after was incorporated M.D. at Cambridge. He was elected a fellow of the Royal College of Physicians 30 September 1682, was five times censor, four times (1699, 1707, 1713, and 1726) Harveian orator, and treasurer from 1714 to 1717 inclusive. From 1710 to 1732 he delivered the Lumleian lectures at the College of Physicians.

His first medical book was published in 1683, ‘Pharmacologia Anti-Empirica, or a Rational Discourse of Remedies both Chymical and Galenical,’ and gives a popular account of the six great remedies, mercury, antimony, vitriol, iron, bark (quinine), and opium, with explanations of the nature of several superstitious remedies, such as broth in which gold had been boiled for consumption, amulets, and charms. A very empty essay on the causes of gout is intercalated, with no discoverable reason but that the Duke of Beaufort, to whom the whole work is dedicated, was threatened with attacks of that disorder.

Harris was physician in ordinary to Charles II in 1683, and soon after the revolution he was appointed physician to William III, and in 1694 attended Queen Mary in her last illness. He has described (Observations on several grievous Diseases) the stages and appearances of the hæmorrhagic eruption of small-pox, of which she died, and mentions that he sat up with her throughout the night succeeding the sixth day of her disease. She died two days later, and he was present at the post-mortem examination of her body. King William took him with him to Holland on his campaign there, and probably talked to him of gardening, as on his return Harris published ‘A Description of the King's Royal Palace and Garden at Loo,’ London, 1699.

While in Holland he published at Amsterdam (1698) ‘De morbis acutis Infantum,’ a work which acquired a reputation beyond its merits, was translated into English (1742), French (1730), and German (1713), and was not supplanted by any other work in England till the publication in 1784 of the much more valuable treatise of Michael Underwood. It is written in imitation of Thomas Sydenham, whom Harris knew and admired, but it lacks the sound basis of long clinical observation which makes Sydenham's work of permanent value. When Harris asked Sydenham for advice as to his medical studies, the great physician is said to have told him to read ‘Don Quixote,’ meaning that he should learn from Cervantes how accurate a knowledge of man may be gained by observation. (Dr. Johnson tells the same story of Richard Blackmore, who also applied to Sydenham for advice.) Harris did not possess sufficient ability to profit by Sydenham's counsel. In 1707 he printed his Harveian oration, and in 1720 published in London ‘De morbis aliquot gravioribus Observationes,’ of which the most interesting part is his account of Queen Mary's illness and death. ‘De Peste Dissertatio,’ London, 1721, and ‘Dissertationes Medicæ et Chirurgicæ habitæ in amphitheatro collegii regalis medicorum Londiniensium,’ 1725, are his remaining medical works. The dissertations are his Lumleian lectures, and contain much praise of Sydenham, but very little original observation. In 1727 he published a short theological treatise, ‘The Works of God.’ He died on 1 August 1732 at his house in Red Lion Square, London.
