= George Rogers (physician) =

English physician

- Born: 1618; London
- Died: 22 January 1697 (aged 78–79)
- Occupation: Physician

George Rogers (1618 – 22 January 1697) was an English physician.

== Biography ==
Rogers was the son of George Rogers, M.D., a fellow of the College of Physicians of London, who died in 1622. He was born in London in 1618. He entered in 1635 Lincoln College, Oxford, where he was a contemporary and friend of Christopher Bennet. He graduated B.A. on 24 January 1638, M.A. 4 December 1641, and M.B. 10 December 1642. He then studied medicine at the university of Padua, where he was consul of the English nation in the university, and graduated M.D. John Evelyn, who continued his acquaintance throughout life, visited him at Padua in June 1645. He was incorporated M.D. at Oxford on 14 April 1648, and about 1654 began to practise as a physician in London. He was elected a fellow of the College of Physicians on 20 October 1664, was treasurer 1683–5, and was president in 1688. In 1681 he delivered the Harveian oration, which was printed in 1682, and of which he gave a copy to Evelyn (Evelyn, Diary). His only other publication is a congratulatory Latin poem to his friend Christopher Bennet, printed in the ‘Theatrum Tabidorum’ in 1655. He resigned on 11 December 1691, owing to ill-health, the office of elect, which he had held in the College of Physicians since 5 September 1682. He died on 22 January 1697, and was buried at Ruislip, Middlesex. He married Elizabeth, daughter of John Hawtrey of Ruislip, and had three daughters, who died young, and three sons, George, Thomas, and John.
