= Humphry Rolleston =

English physician

Sir Humphry Rolleston Bt GCVO KCB
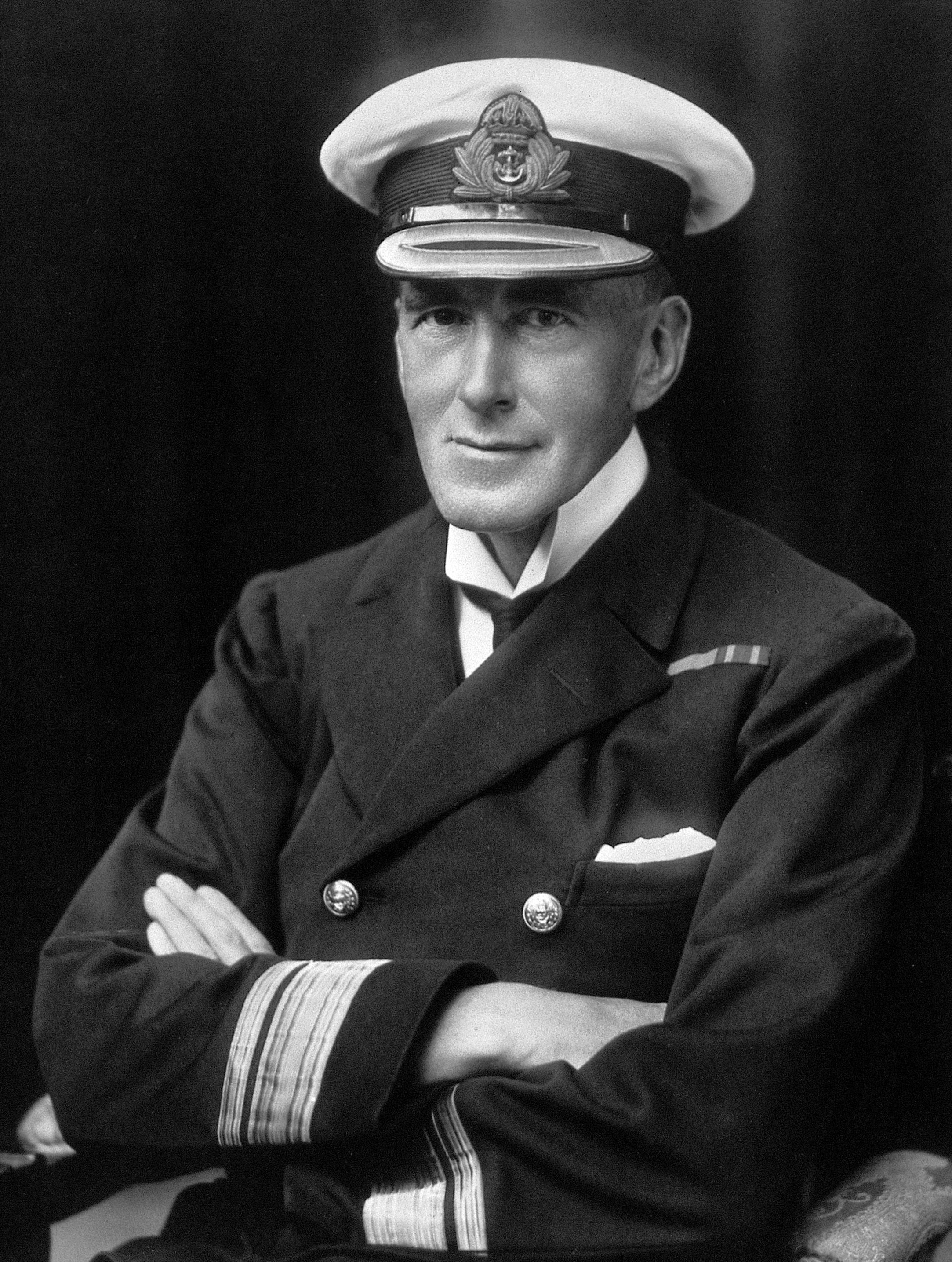
- Humphry Davy Rolleston in 1916
- Born: 21 June 1862
- Died: 24 September 1944 (aged 82); Haslemere, England
- Education: Marlborough College; St John's College, Cambridge; Barts
- Occupation: Physician
- Years active: 1888–1932
- Known for: President, Royal College of Physicians (1922–1926), Physician-in-Ordinary to King George VI (1923–1932)
- Medical career
- Institutions: St George's Hospital

Signature
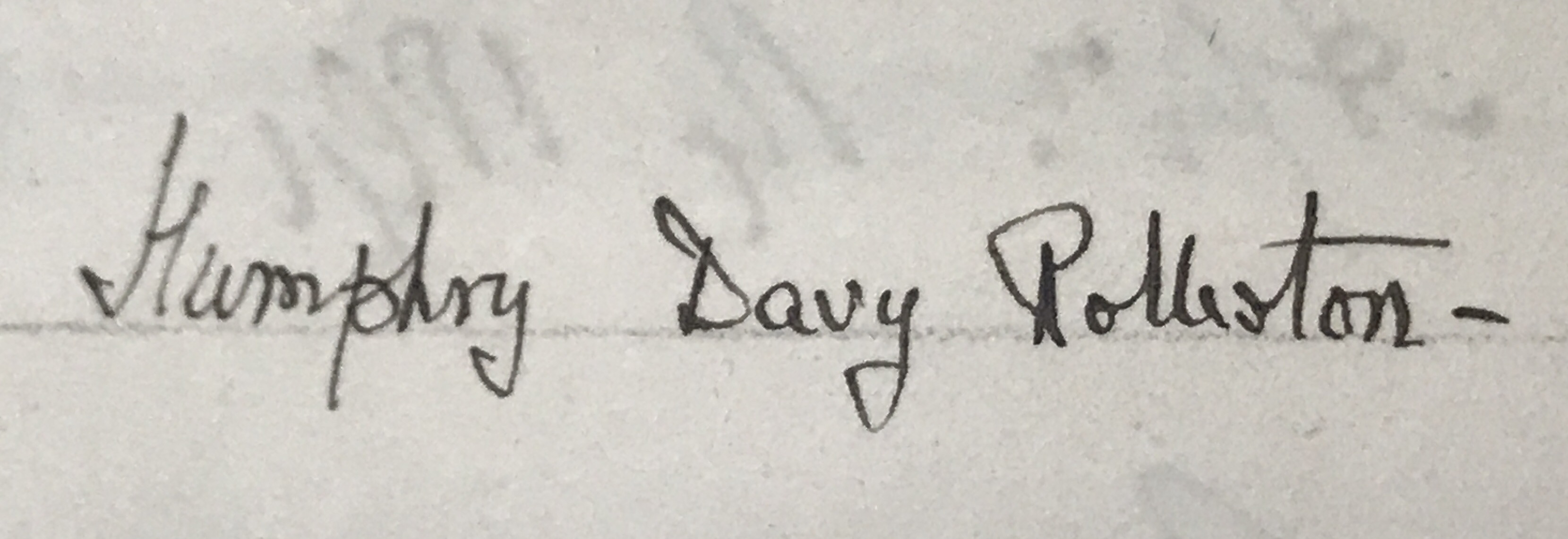

Sir Humphry Davy Rolleston, 1st Baronet, GCVO, KCB (21 June 1862 – 23 September 1944) was a prominent English physician.

Rolleston was the son of George Rolleston (Linacre Professor of Physiology at Oxford) and Grace Davy, daughter of John Davy and niece of Sir Humphry Davy, Bt (chemist). He was educated at Marlborough College, proceeded to St John's College, Cambridge and graduated in Natural Sciences in 1886. After clinical training at St Bartholomew's Hospital, London he qualified MB (Cambridge) in 1888 and MD in 1892.

== Public service and honours ==
In 1891 he became Physician at St George's Hospital, Hyde Park Corner, London and continued there until 1919. This period, however, was interrupted by his service during the Second Boer War, where he served with the Imperial Yeomanry Hospital, Pretoria. In World War I he was consulting surgeon and surgeon rear-admiral with the Royal Navy. He remained active on consultative board for the Navy for many years thereafter.

Rolleston gave the 1895 Goulstonian Lectures on the subject of On the suprarenal bodies, the 1919 Lumleian Lectures on cerebro-spinal fever and the 1928 Harveian Oration on Cardio-Vascular Diseases Since Harvey's Discovery.

Rolleston was President of the London Medical Society in 1904, the Royal Society of Medicine between 1918 and 1920 and of the Royal College of Physicians between 1922 and 1925. He chaired the Rolleston Committee formed in 1924.

From 1923 to 1932 he was Physician-in-Ordinary to King George V. He was made a Knight Commander of the Order of the Bath in 1918, created a baronet, of Upper Brook Street in the parish of Saint George, Hanover Square, in the County of London, in the 1924 Birthday Honours and made a Knight Grand Cross of the Royal Victorian Order (GCVO) in the 1929 Birthday Honours.

Rolleston was president of the Eugenics Society from 1933 to 1935.

In 1925, on the death of Thomas Clifford Allbutt, the Regius Professor of Physic (Cambridge), Rolleston was appointed as his successor, but under a newly imposed age-limit he retired from that position in 1932. He became President of the Medical Society of London in 1926.

On his death in 1944, aged 82, Rolleston's baronetcy became extinct.

== History of medicine ==
Rolleston's writings on the history of medicine include:

- Medical Aspects of Samuel Johnson (1924)
- Life of Sir Clifford Allbutt (1929)
- The Cambridge Medical School: a biographical history (1932).
- The Two Heberdens (1933)

Rolleston was one of the two contributors to the revised and updated version for Encyclopædia Britannica of the bulk of Thomas Clifford Allbutt's article "Medicine" which had been in the 11th edition. As revised for the 14th edition (1929) Rolleston's part was "Medicine, General" (in volume 15), followed by the other part, "Medicine, History of", by Charles Singer, Lecturer in the History of Medicine, University of London.

A small collection of his papers is held at the National Library of Medicine in Bethesda, Maryland.

== Medicine ==
His non-historical medical writing include:

- Some Medical Aspects of Old Age (1922)
- Rolleston was the senior editor for the 12-volume British Encyclopaedia of Medical Practice (1936–39).

Academic offices
Preceded by Sir Rickman Godlee	President of the Royal Society of Medicine; 1918–1920	Succeeded by Sir John Bland-Sutton
Preceded by Sir Norman Moore	President of the Royal College of Physicians; 1922–1925	Succeeded by Sir John Bradford
Baronetage of the United Kingdom
New creation	Baronet (of Upper Brook Street); 1924–1944	Extinct
