= John Mitchell Bruce =

British pathologist, physician, and physiologist

- Born: 19 October 1846; Keig, Marr, Aberdeenshire
- Died: 7 July 1929 (aged 82); Harley Street, London
- Occupation: Physician
- Known for: Materia Medica and Therapeutics (1884); notes as attending physician during Benjamin Disraeli's final illness

John Mitchell Bruce CVO FRCP FRCPI (1846–1929) was a British physician, pathologist, and physiologist.

== Biography ==
After education at Aberdeen Grammar School, J. Mitchell Bruce matriculated at the University of Aberdeen, where he graduated MA in 1866. He studied medicine at the Middlesex Hospital, graduating MB (Lond.) in 1870. He undertook postgraduate study in pathology at Vienna and at London's Brown Animal Sanatory Institution under John Burdon-Sanderson and Edward Emanuel Klein. Bruce briefly held a junior appointment at Aberdeen Royal Infirmary before he was appointed in 1871 lecturer in physiology at Charing Cross Hospital. There he became in 1873 assistant physician, in 1882 full physician, and in 1904 consulting physician upon his retirement. He relinquished his physiological lectureship in 1877, taught materia medica from 1877 to 1890, and medicine from 1890 to 1901.

Mitchell Bruce also conducted his own consulting practice for many years, which grew in size throughout his professional career. He was a relatively junior doctor when he attended his most famous patient, Benjamin Disraeli, first Earl of Beaconsfield, the former Prime Minister, in the last ten days of Disraeli's life, in April 1881.

Bruce was dean of the Charing Cross Hospital Medical School from 1883 to 1890. He was physician to Royal Brompton Hospital for twenty years.

His best-known contribution to the medical profession was his publication, Materia Medica and Therapeutics (1884), of which 70,000 copies were sold during his lifetime. He was also an editor of The Practitioner, and an assistant editor of Sir Richard Quain's A Dictionary of Medicine (1882–94), writing the sections on 'heart disease' and 'acute and chronic rheumatism'.

One of a notable group, with Burdon-Sanderson, Lauder Brunton, Ferrier, and Klein, Bruce laid the foundations in the seventies for that scientific development in physiology, pharmacology, and histology which was destined to prove so fruitful.

Bruce was married and had one son.

== Awards and honours ==
- 1878 — FRCP
- 1901 — Lettsomian Lecturer on Diseases and Disorders of the Heart and Arteries in Middle and Advanced Life
- 1911 — Lumleian Lecturer on Cardio-Vascular Degeneration
- 1913 — Harveian Orator
- 1919 — CVO

== Selected publications ==
- Materia Medica and Therapeutics. 1884. 9th edition, with the assistance of Walter J. Dilling. London: Cassell & Co. 1912.
- The principles of treatment and their applications in practical medicine. Pentland's medical series; v. 7. Young J. Pentland. 1899.
- "Lettsomian Lectures on Diseases and Disorders of the Heart and Arteries in Middle and Advanced Life. Lecture I". The Lancet. 1: 692–694. 9 March 1901. doi:10.1016/s0140-6736(01)71210-x.
- "Lettsomian Lectures on Diseases and Disorders of the Heart and Arteries in Middle and Advanced Life. Lecture II". The Lancet. 1: 844–848. 23 March 1901. doi:10.1016/s0140-6736(01)70853-7.
- "Lettsomian Lectures on Diseases and Disorders of the Heart and Arteries in Middle and Advanced Life. Lecture III". The Lancet. 1: 991–994. 6 April 1901. doi:10.1016/s0140-6736(01)82709-4.
- The Harveian oration on the influence of Harvey's work in the development of the docrtrine of infection and immunity, delivered before the Royal college of physicians of London, on October 18th, 1913. London. 1913.
