= John Hollings =

English physician

John Hollings or Hollins, FRS M.D. (baptised 14 November 1682–10 May 1739) was an English physician.

Hollings was born in Shrewsbury and baptised at St Chad's Church there on 14 November 1682, the son of physician John Hollings, M.D., of Shrewsbury, formerly fellow of Magdalene College, Cambridge, and his wife Mary. After attending Shrewsbury School, he entered Emmanuel College, Cambridge in 1700, shortly afterwards migrating to Magdalene College as a pensioner on 27 March 1700. He proceeded M.B. in 1705 and M.D. in 1710. He was admitted a candidate of the Royal College of Physicians on 25 June 1725, and a fellow on 25 June 1726, having on 16 March previously been elected a Fellow of the Royal Society. He rose to be physician-general to the army and physician in ordinary to the king from 1727 to 1739.

He died aged 56 in Pall Mall, London on 10 May 1739. By his wife Jane he had a son, John Hollings, M.D., who died on 28 December 1739, and two daughters, Mrs. (Jane) Champernowne and Margaret. Hollings's reputation for classical scholarship and general culture was considerable. His only publication was the Harveian oration for 1734, entitled Status Humanæ Naturæ expositus in Oratione coram Medicis Londinensibus habita, 4to, London, 1734, of which an English translation appeared the same year.
