= George Hamilton Roe =

Irish physician

- Born: 18 May 1795; New Ross
- Died: 13 April 1873 (aged 77)
- Occupation: Physician

George Hamilton Roe (18 May 1795 – 13 April 1873) was an Irish physician.

== Biography ==
Roe was born on 18 May 1795 at New Ross, County Wexford. He was the eldest son of Peter Roe, a banker, and a cousin of George Roe, a distiller in Dublin. He began his medical studies somewhat late in life, after his marriage in 1817, and was admitted to the degree of M.D. in Edinburgh on 1 August 1821, his inaugural thesis being ‘De respiratione.’ He then proceeded to Paris, returning later to London, where he was admitted a licentiate of the Royal College of Physicians on 25 June 1823. He was still pursuing his studies at Trinity College, Dublin, where he graduated as B.A., M.A., M.B., and M.D., the last degree being conferred upon him in 1827. He was incorporated upon this degree at Oxford in 1828, being at that time a member of Magdalen Hall, afterwards Hertford College. He was admitted a candidate of the Royal College of Physicians of London on 13 April 1835, and a fellow on 25 June 1836.

He was appointed a physician to the Westminster Hospital in 1825, and, after serving for some time as a lecturer on medicine, he resigned in 1854. He was also a physician to the Hospital for Consumption and Diseases of the Chest, Brompton, to which he attached himself upon its foundation in 1841. He was elected a fellow of the Royal Medical and Chirurgical Society in 1835, and served upon its council during 1841–2. He was Harveian orator at the Royal College of Physicians in 1856, and consiliarius in 1864, 1865, and 1866. He died on 13 April 1873, and was buried in the Brompton cemetery. His son, William Gason Roe, was a medical practitioner at Westminster.

Dr. Roe was an intelligent, well-informed, and practical physician. His decided manner won for him the confidence of his patients, but his private practice was small. He early gained the disapprobation of the members of his own profession by the promiscuous manner in which he gave advice gratuitously to those who could well afford to pay for it. He belonged to the Christian apostolic church.

He was the author of ‘A Treatise on the Hooping Cough and its complications, with Hints on the Management of Children,’ 8vo, London, 1836. The publication of this book gave rise to a fierce controversy between himself and Dr. Augustus Bozzi Granville, who charged him with gross plagiarism.
