= John Grosvenor =

English surgeon (1742–1823)

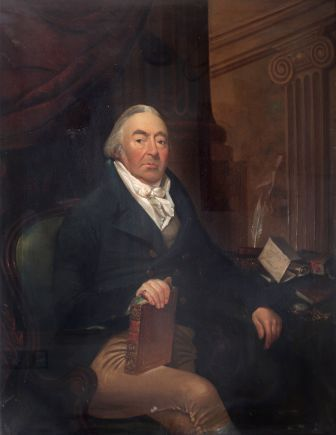
John Grosvenor, 1812 painting by Thomas Leeming

John Grosvenor (1742 – 30 June 1823) was an English surgeon.

== Life ==
He was born at Oxford, the son of Stephen Grosvenor, sub-treasurer of Christ Church. He received medical education in Worcester and the London hospitals, and later became anatomical surgeon on Matthew Lee's foundation at Christ Church.

Grosvenor was long the most noted practical surgeon in Oxford, especially for his treatment of stiff and diseased joints by friction. He was admitted to the privileges of the university on 24 February 1768. In 1795, on the death of William Jackson, the university printer, he became chief proprietor and editor of the Oxford Journal. He married Anne (née Hough), the widow of John Parsons.
