= Iona Heath =

English medical doctor and writer

Iona Caroline Heath CBE FRCGP is an English medical doctor and writer who was president of the Royal College of General Practitioners (RCGP) from 2009 to 2012. She worked as an inner-city general practitioner in Kentish Town in London from 1975 until 2010.

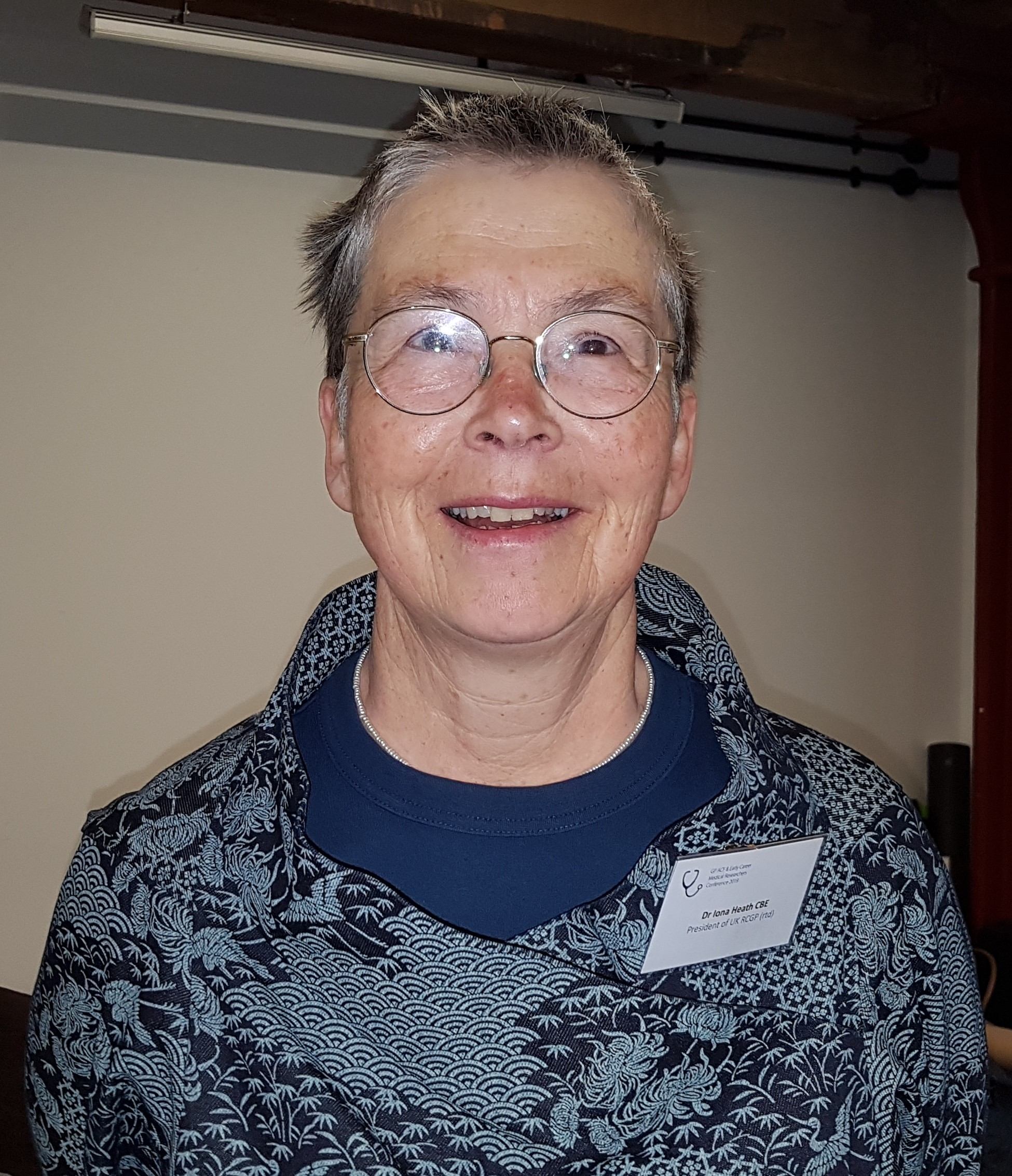
Heath in 2019

== Career ==
Heath graduated from Cambridge University in 1974. The following year she began work as a general practitioner in the Caversham Group Practice, covering the inner-city area of Kentish Town in North-West London, caring for a mostly disadvantaged and hugely ethnically diverse population. She retired from clinical practice in 2010.

She was a nationally elected member of the Council of the UK Royal College of General Practitioners from 1989 to 2010 and chaired the College's Committee on Medical Ethics from 1998 to 2004 and the International Committee from 2006 to 2009. She was elected President of the College for a three-year term from 2009 to 2012. From 1993 to 2001, she was an editorial adviser for the British Medical Journal and chaired the journal's Ethics Committee from 2004 to 2009. She was an elected member of the world executive of the World Organization of Family Doctors from 2007 to 2012. She was a member of the UK Human Genetics Commission from 2004 to 2007.

She was a Member of the Royal Commission on Long Term Care for the Elderly 1997–1999.

She gave the Harveian Oration for the UK Royal College of Physicians in 2011.

She wrote a regular Op Ed column for the British Medical Journal for eight years and has contributed essays to many other medical journals across the world. She has been particularly interested to explore the nature of general practice, the importance of medical generalism, issues of justice and liberty in relation to health care, the corrosive influence of the medical industrial complex and the commercialisation of medicine, and the challenges posed by disease-mongering, the care of the dying, and violence within families.

=== Views on ADHD ===
In 2026, Heath appeared in the Channel 4 documentary The Great ADHD Myth?, in which she questioned the medical status of attention deficit hyperactivity disorder (ADHD). She described the symptoms listed in the Diagnostic and Statistical Manual of Mental Disorders as an “arbitrary list of normal behavioural characteristics” and said that ADHD was “certainly not a medical condition” in her view. In a subsequent interview, she called for the ADHD label to be banned and described the issue as societal rather than medical.

Her comments attracted criticism from ADHD researchers, clinicians, advocacy groups and people with lived experience, particularly amid wider criticism that the documentary presented a one-sided account of ADHD. Katya Rubia, a neuroscientist interviewed for the programme, said that her contribution had been “cherry-picked, truncated and presented out of context” to support the programme’s narrative that ADHD did not exist and had no biological basis. She said that although brain scans could not currently be used to diagnose ADHD in an individual, there was consistent evidence of group-level differences in brain structure, function and connectivity between children with and without ADHD, alongside evidence of delayed brain maturation in some children with ADHD.

Rubia also criticised the programme’s presentation of a child who stopped taking ADHD medication while simultaneously undergoing several lifestyle changes, including reduced screen use, dietary changes, increased outdoor activity and more family interaction. She described the segment as anecdotal evidence that could not establish the cause of the child’s subsequent changes in behaviour or functioning. Anita Thapar, a clinician-scientist at Cardiff University and chair of the NHS England Independent ADHD Taskforce, similarly said that the programme did not adequately represent the clinical research evidence on ADHD and used sensational language, including a comparison between medication and corporal punishment.

The Royal College of General Practitioners (RCGP), of which Heath was a former president, said that the remarks attributed to her had not been made on behalf of the College. The RCGP stated that it recognised ADHD as a neurodevelopmental condition and supported evidence-based care in accordance with current national guidance.

The Royal College of Psychiatrists stated that the way neurodevelopmental conditions are discussed could fuel stigma and discourage people from seeking support and treatment. Its president, Subodh Dave, said that research suggested ADHD affected 3–5% of the population and remained under-recognised, under-diagnosed and under-treated in the United Kingdom. The College also said that ADHD diagnosis required a comprehensive clinical assessment rather than questionnaires alone, and advised people wishing to stop ADHD medication to consult their doctor first.

The NHS England Independent ADHD Taskforce report stated that ADHD was a clinical diagnosis included within the neurodevelopmental-disorder grouping in current international diagnostic classification systems. It said that diagnosis required a full clinical assessment and could not be established on the basis of questionnaires alone. The report also identified stigma, misinformation and misunderstanding as challenges experienced by people with ADHD, and recommended systemic changes across health, education and employment to improve access to assessment, treatment and support.

ADHD UK also criticised the documentary and submitted a complaint to Ofcom, arguing that the programme misled viewers and risked reinforcing stigma surrounding ADHD. The organisation said that the documentary’s central case study involved several simultaneous changes and that the programme’s conclusion was not supported by the evidence presented.

== Honours ==
She was made Commander of the Order of the British Empire (CBE) in the 2000 New Year Honours for services to the Care of Elderly People,

== Publications ==
- John Berger - Ways of Learning, Oxford University Press, 2024 ISBN 978-0-19-286423-9
- Matters of Life and Death: Key Writings, Routledge, 2007 ISBN 978-1846190964
- The mystery of general practice, Nuffield Trust, 1995 ISBN 0900574933
