= John Herbert Parsons =

British ophthalmologist and ophthalmic surgeon

Sir John Herbert Parsons CBE FRS FRCS (3 September 1863, Bristol – 7 October 1957, University College Hospital, London) was a British ophthalmologist and ophthalmic surgeon.

== Education ==
Parsons was educated at the University of Bristol, University College London, and at St Bartholomew's Hospital. He received in 1890 his BSc in physiology, in 1891 his MRCS, and in 1892 his MB.

== Career and research ==
He was appointed an assistant in the Department of Physiology at University College London and practised medicine for several years in Finchley. He then became a clinical assistant at Moorfields Eye Hospital. In 1900 he received the MB London and the FRCS England. At Moorfields, he was promoted from clinical assistant and became, successively, curator and librarian and was then elected to the surgical staff in 1904. He became an ophthalmic surgeon at University College Hospital and continued as a surgeon there and at Moorfields until his retirement. He was also an ophthalmic surgeon for some years at the Hospital for Sick Children, Great Ormond Street. In ophthalmic pathology he became a world authority and produced numerous research articles and several books on eye diseases, ophthalmic optics. and ophthalmic circulation.

... His most popular work, which maintained an immense circulation all through his working life, was his Diseases of the Eye, an excellent, comprehensive and uniquely compact manual for students and practitioners which first appeared in 1907 and continually demanded new editions. But his first classical work was his monumental treatise The Pathology of the Eye, which appeared in four volumes (1904–8). As curator at Moorfields he had grounded himself well in pathology, and in this great work ophthalmic pathology was for the first time integrated into a self-contained discipline. ...

Parsons served on various government committees dealing with vision tests, blindness prevention, and proper lighting in factories. During World War I he was a consultant ophthalmological surgeon with the rank of Colonel, Army Medical Service, for which he was awarded Commander of the Order of the British Empire (CBE) in the 1919 Birthday Honours. From 1928 to 1932 he was a member of the Medical Research Council.

... One of the band of great clinical leaders who retained for ophthalmology in this country at the end of the last and the beginning of the present century the proud position it inherited fifty years previously from Sir William Bowman—Nettleship, Doyne, Gunn, Collins, Fisher, Lawford, Paton, and others—he outstripped them all in intellectual brilliance and force of character. ... Alone among them he realized that advances in ophthalmology did not lie solely in the clinic or in the pathological laboratory, that a new age was emerging wherein clinical pictures were to be interpreted in terms of physiology, physics, and chemistry; and he had the energy and ability to follow out his convictions. ...

=== Honours and awards ===
- 1904 and 1914 — Middlemore Prize
- 1907 — Nettleship Gold Medal
- 1919 — Doyne Medal from Oxford
- 1919 — C.B.E.
- 1921 — Fellow of the Royal Society
- 1922 — Knighthood
- 1925 — Bowman Lectureship
- 1929 — honoured guest at the opening of the Wilmer Eye Institute in the United States
- 1936 — Howe Medal of the American Academy of Ophthalmology and Otolaryngology
- 1936–1938 — President of the Royal Society of Medicine

=== Selected works ===
- Parsons JH (1918). Diseases of the Eye (3rd ed.). Toronto: Macmillan.
  - Sihota R; Tandon R, eds. (2011). Parsons' Diseases of the Eye (21st ed.). Elsevier India. ISBN 9788131225547.
- Parsons JH. The Pathology of the Eye. New York: G.P. Putnam's Sons. (Volumes 1 to 4, published from 1904 to 1908)
