= Geoffrey Marshall (physician) =

Sir Geoffrey Marshall
- Born: 23 April 1887
- Died: 9 August 1982 (aged 95)
- Occupation: Physician
- Employer(s): Guy's Hospital; Royal Brompton Hospital
- Known for: invention of forerunner of Boyle's anaesthetic machine

Sir Geoffrey Marshall KCVO CBE OBE FRCP FRCPI (1887–1982) was an English physician, pulmonologist, and pioneer of anaesthia.

After education at St Paul's School, London, he studied medicine at Guy's Hospital and graduated MB BS Lond in 1911. At Guy's Hospital he was from 1911 to 1914 a demonstrator in physiology and medical registrar. In 1914 he joined the RAMC and was sent to France as a medical officer in the British Expeditionary Force.

As a respiratory physiologist Geoffrey invented gas and oxygen anaesthesia and devised his own machine while serving as an anaesthetist in the Royal Army Medical Corps in the first world war.

For his medical service in France he was twice mentioned in despatches and in 1917 was appointed OBE. In a hospital in France he married Belle, a British nurse, a few days before the Armistice. He was demobilised with the rank of major and resumed academic work, earning a higher MD with gold medal in 1920. In 1920 he also qualified MRCP. At Guy's Hospital he was appointed medical officer in charge of the tuberculosis department and became subdean of the medical school. He was elected FRCP in 1928.

In 1934 Marshall joined the staff of the Royal Brompton Hospital. In the late 1940s he furthered the introduction and use of streptomycin for pulmonary tuberculosis. He was appointed chairman of the clinical trials committee of the Medical Research Council. He gave in 1949 the Harveian Oration on Individuality in medicine.

Marshall was one of the founders of the Thoracic Society, which in 1946 started publication of the journal Thorax. (The Thoracic Society was amalgamated in 1982 into the British Thoracic Society.)

For his service as honorary consulting physician to the Ministry of Pensions and as principal referee to the Civil Service Committee, he was in 1951 appointed CBE. In 1951 he was also appointed KCVO for his service as physician to King George VI. In 1951 Clement Price Thomas operated on the King for lung cancer, and Geoffrey Marshall stayed at Buckingham Palace to supervise the King's recovery from the operation.

He was the co-editor, with Kenneth Murray Allan Perry, of Diseases of the Chest (vol. 2, 1952). Marshall wrote "Diseases of the respiratory tract" in Conybeare's Textbook of Medicine and many articles.

He was president of the Royal Society of Medicine from 1958 to 1960. He was elected honorary FRCPI in 1965.

== Personal life ==
Marshall's first wife died in 1974. Their only child, a son David, died in WWII in a military hospital in Cairo from wound-related diphtheria.

In 1979, Sir Geoffrey married his longtime secretary Joan Wilson Brown. Two months after they married she became ill and died within a few weeks.

== Selected publications ==
- Marshall G (4 December 1937). "Early Diagnosis of Pulmonary Tuberculosis". Br Med J. 2 (4013): 1103–1104. doi:10.1136/bmj.2.4013.1103. PMC 2087853. PMID 20781088.
- with S. Roodhouse Gloyne and Clifford Hoyle: Gloyne SR, Marshall G, Hoyle C (March 1949). "Pneumoconiosis Due to Graphite Dust". Thorax. 4 (1): 31–38. doi:10.1136/thx.4.1.31. PMC 1018286. PMID 18113254.
