= George Graham (physician) =

British physician (1882–1971)

- Born: 27 February 1882; London, England
- Died: 12 November 1971 (aged 89)
- Occupation: Diabetologist
- Known for: Ladder diet

George Graham FRCP (1882–1971) was a British physician, physiologist, and diabetologist.

After education at St Paul's School, London, George Graham matriculated at Trinity College, Cambridge, where he graduated BA in 1904. After studying medicine at St Bartholomew's Hospital and qualifying MRCS, LRCP in 1907, he graduated from the University of Cambridge with MB BChir in 1908 and MD in 1912.

Supported by a Beit Memorial Fellowship, he worked from 1912 to 1914 at the Institute of Physiology in Munich on the protein-sparing action of carbohydrates. During WWI he was associated with Sir Archibald Garrod. Graham was a captain in the RAMC from 1916 to 1919. After demobilisation, he was appointed assistant physician to the Royal Northern Hospital. In 1920 he was elected FRCP and began working at St Bartholomew Hospital's newly established medical professorial unit, which was directed by Francis Fraser after Sir Archibald Garrod went to Oxford. At St Bartholomew's Hospital, Graham was influenced by William Holdsworth Hurtley and Sir Archibald Garrod, who was a consulting physician at several hospitals. Graham studied the physiology and biochemistry of diabetes. He was the first researcher in the UK to show that blood sugar increases after food intake. He was the first to describe renal glycosuria.

He was largely responsible for the formation of the hospital dietetic department. His Ladder Diet was a significant advance in the management of diabetes during the pre-insulin era.

Graham ... employs the "ladder diet," in which carbohydrate is maintained at a low level, whilst protein and fat are fixed from the outset at a relatively high level and gradually increased; carbohydrate is added in at the end. This system has many adherents; it is easy of application and yields briilliant results, especially in those milder cases tolerating high protein-fat allowances and reacting badly only to carbohydrates.

At St Bartholomew's Hospital, he was appointed in 1924 assistant physician and in 1932 full physician, upon the retirement of Sir Percival Horton Smith Hartley. Graham retired in 1946.

The Royal College of Physicians chose him as the Goulstonian Lecturer (1921), the Croonian Lecturer (1940), and the Harveian Orator (1953). Under the auspices of the Medical Society of London in 1938 he delivered that year's Lettsomian Lectures on diabetes and its treatment. He was the Royal Institute of Public Health's Harben Lecturer for 1949; as such, he gave in January 1950 three lectures on diabetes.

Elected a member of the Physiological Society in 1913, Graham published in 1911–1924 a series of papers and communications in the Journal of Physiology: on the dissociation curve of blood (1913) with Barcroft; on creatine and creatinine (1913–14) with Poulton ... ; on the leak point in diabetes (1915).

== Selected publications ==
- with J. Bancroft and H. L. Higgins: "The effect of carbohydrate-free diet on the dissociation curve of blood". Journal of Physiology. 45: xlvii. 1913.
- with E. P. Poulton: "Possible errors in the estimation of creatinine and creatine by Folin's method". Journal of Physiology. 46: xliv–xlv. 1913.
- "Variations in the 'leak-point' in diabetes. I. A low level". Journal of Physiology. 49: xlvi–xlvii. 1915. (What Graham calls the 'leak-point' in diabetes is now called the renal threshold for glucose.)
- "Variations in the 'leak-point' in diabetes. II. A high level". Journal of Physiology. 49: xlviii–xlvix. 1915.
- Graham, G. (1925). "Treatment of diabetes by raw fresh gland (pancreas)". British Medical Journal. 1 (3357): 859–860. doi:10.1136/bmj.1.3357.859-b. PMC 2226364.
- Graham, G. (1940). "A review of the causes of diabetes mellitus". British Medical Journal. 2 (4162): 479–482. doi:10.1136/bmj.2.4162.479. PMC 2179623. PMID 20783334.
- Graham, G. (1940). "The role of the liver in diabetes mellitus". British Medical Journal. 2 (4163): 513–516. doi:10.1136/bmj.2.4163.513. PMC 2179276. PMID 20783345.
