= Stuart Taylor baronets =

Baronetcy in the Baronetage of the United Kingdom

The Taylor, later Stuart Taylor Baronetcy, of Kennington in the County of London, is a title in the Baronetage of the United Kingdom.

It was created on 11 July 1917 for the prominent physician Frederick Taylor. He was President of the Royal College of Physicians. He was succeeded by his son, the second Baronet. He assumed the additional surname of Stuart. As of 2007 the title is held by his grandson, the fourth Baronet, who succeeded his father in 1978.

== Taylor, later Stuart Taylor baronets, of Kennington (1917) ==
- Sir Frederick Taylor, 1st Baronet (1847–1920)
- Sir Eric Stuart Taylor, 2nd Baronet (1889–1977)
- Sir Richard Lawrence Stuart Taylor, 3rd Baronet (1925–1978)
- Sir Nicholas Richard Stuart Taylor, 4th Baronet (born 1952)

There is no heir to the baronetcy.
