= Thomas Beach (painter) =

English painter

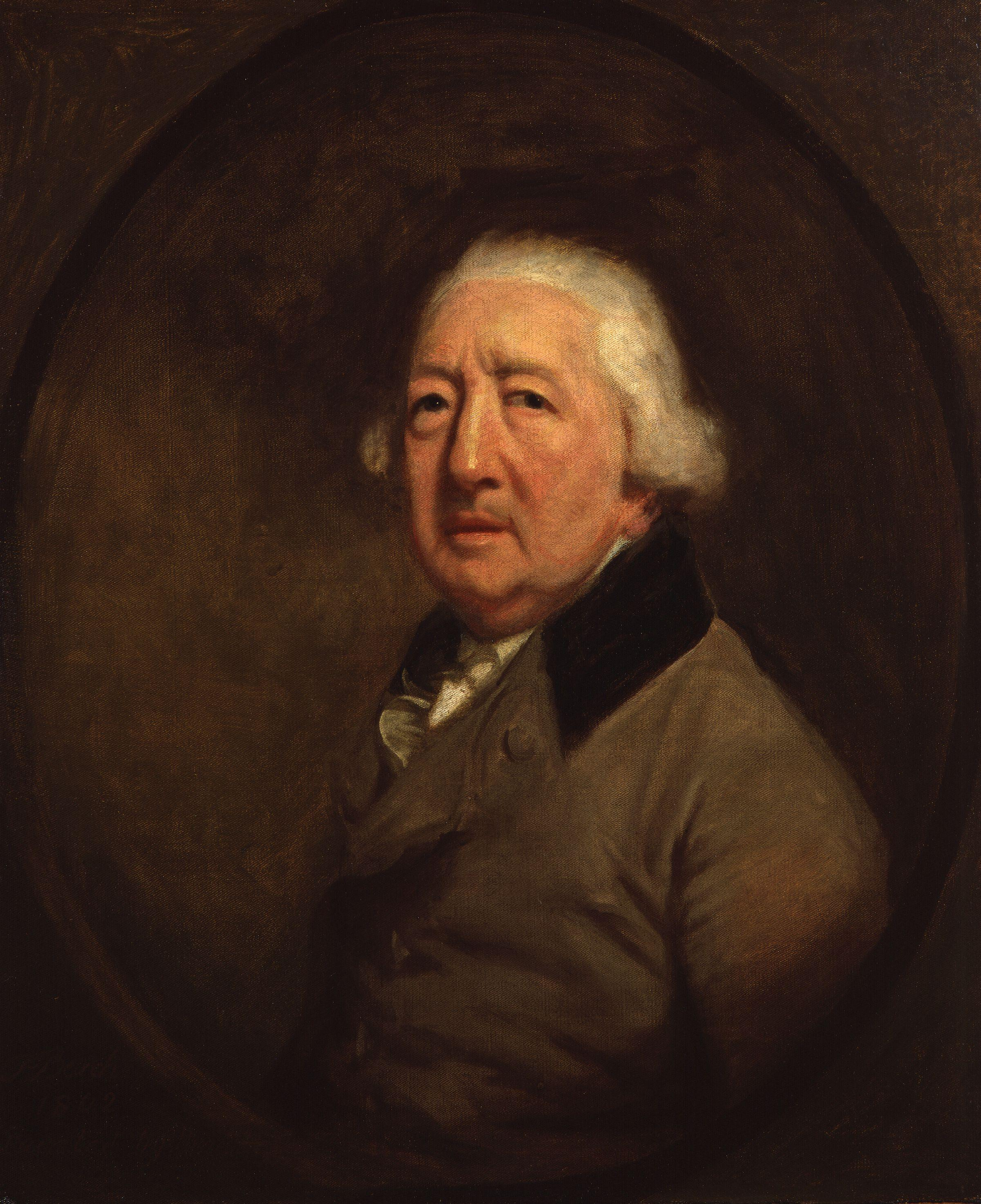
Self-portrait (1802; National Portrait Gallery, London).

Thomas Beach (1738 – 17 December 1806) was an English painter who specialised in portrait painting and studied under Sir Joshua Reynolds.

== Life and work ==
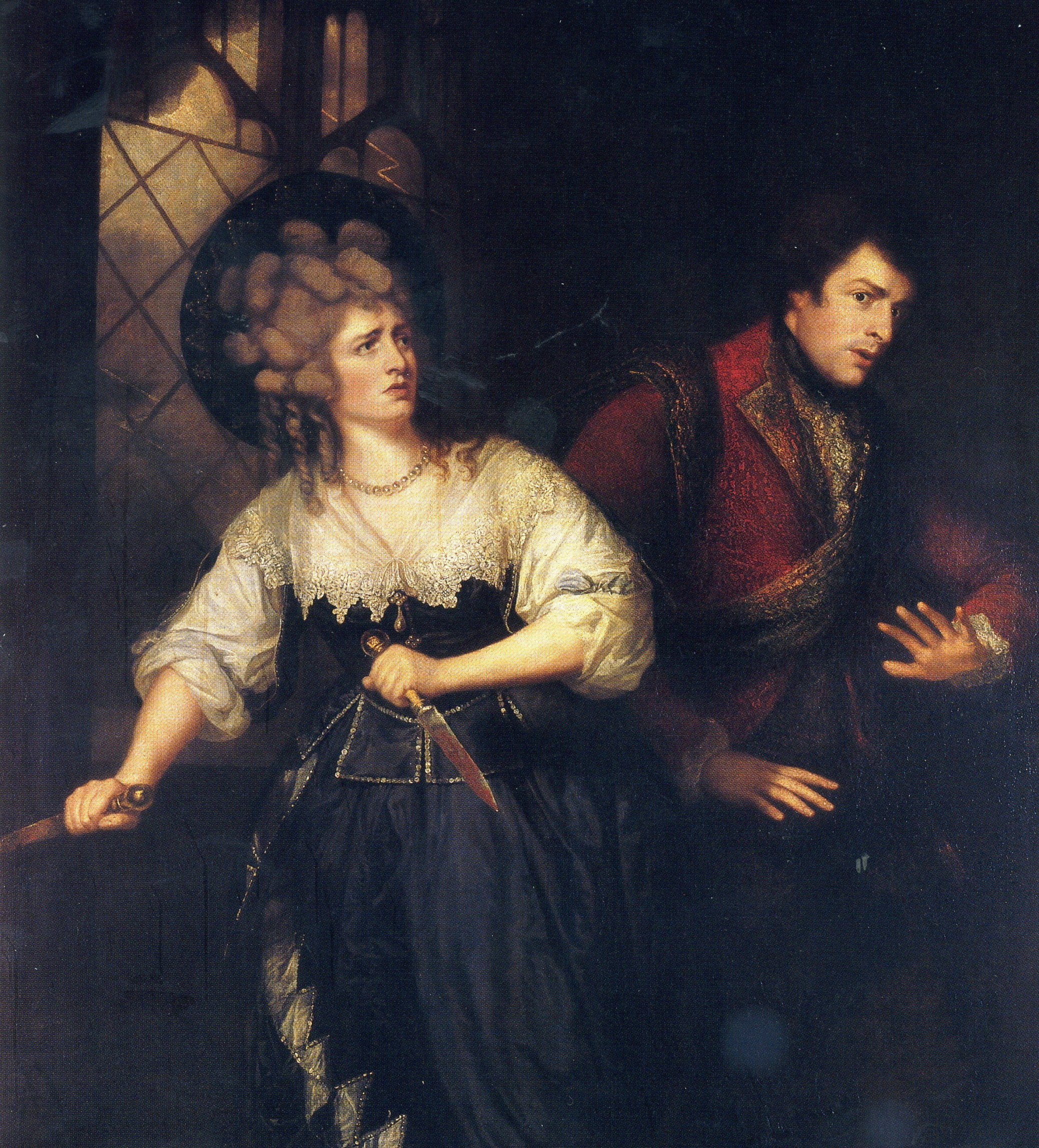
John Kemble and Mrs. Siddons, in "Macbeth", painted in 1786, now housed at the Garrick Club in London.

Beach was born at Milton Abbas, Dorset in 1738, and showed a strong predilection for art from an early age. In 1760, under the patronage of Lord Dorchester's family, he became a pupil of Sir Joshua Reynolds, while at the same time studying at the St. Martin's Lane Academy. He then settled at the fashionable resort of Bath, where he was much in demand for his portraits and portrait groups, which were usually of a small size.

He painted the actress Sarah Siddons several times. In his first portrait of her, painted in the winter of 1781–2, she is shown seated, in everyday clothes, holding a book. He depicted her again later in 1782, in one of his more ambitious works, an allegorical portrait inspired by Milton's Il Penseroso, in which she represented the personification of Melancholy. In 1787 he painted Mrs. Siddons and John Kemble in the Dagger Scene in Macbeth, of which the actress wrote, "My brother's head is the finest I have ever seen, and the likest of the two".

He was a member of the Incorporated Society of Artists, and a contributor to its exhibitions from 1772 to 1783. He exhibited the Royal Academy every year from 1785 until 1790, but not again until 1797, when he was living at Strand-on-the-Green, near Kew in London, and sent a portrait of the Prince of Wales. Several of Beach's portraits were engraved in mezzotint by William Dickinson, Valentine Green, Richard Houston, and John Jones.

Beach died at Dorchester, Dorset, on 17 December 1806.

The National Portrait Gallery has a portrait by Beach of William Woodfall, the earliest parliamentary reporter. Portraits of Sir Edward Wilmot, bart., M.D., and Richard Tattersall, the horse dealer who established 'Tattersall's, were exhibited in the National Portrait Exhibition of 1867.
