= Ambrose Dawson =

English physician

Ambrose Dawson (1707–1794) was an English physician.

== Life ==
The son of William Dawson of Langcliff, Yorkshire, was born in Settle, Yorkshire. After education at Giggleswick School, he entered Christ's College, Cambridge in 1724, and graduated M.B. 1730, M.D. 1735.

In 1737 Dawson was elected a fellow of the Royal College of Physicians, was censor four times, and he delivered the Harveian oration in 1744. He was elected physician to St. George's Hospital, 27 April 1745, and held the post for 15 years, living in Grosvenor Street, London.

Dawson retired to his paternal estate of Langcliff Hall. Later he moved to Liverpool, and died there on 23 December 1794. He was buried in Bolton in Craven.

== Works ==
Dawson's Latin Harveian oration was printed in 1745. In 1778 he published Thoughts on the Hydrocephalus Internus and Observations on Hydatids in the Heads of Cattle (both London).

== Notes ==
Attribution

This article incorporates text from a publication now in the public domain: Stephen, Leslie, ed. (1888). "Dawson, Ambrose". Dictionary of National Biography. Vol. 14. London: Smith, Elder & Co.
