= Sir Edward Wilmot, 1st Baronet =

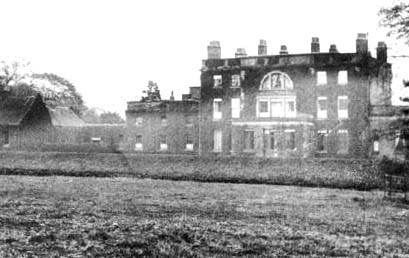
Chaddesden Hall in about 1900

Sir Edward Wilmot, 1st Baronet (1693–1786) was a surgeon and physician to both George II and George III of Great Britain.

He became a successful physician, and his clients included the family of King George II. He was made a baronet in February 1730, becoming Sir Edward Wilmot, bart., of Chaddesden. Wilmot became the army's physician general and George III's physician. He resided at 18 Cork Street in Westminster.

== Early life ==
The second son of Robert Wilmot and Joyce, daughter of William Sacheverell of Staunton, Leicestershire, he was born at his father's seat of Chaddesden near Derby on 29 October 1693. He entered St John's College, Cambridge and graduated B.A. in 1714. He was elected a fellow, took his M.A. degree in 1718 and M.D. in 1725.

== Physician ==
He was admitted a candidate or member of the Royal College of Physicians on 30 September 1725, and was elected a fellow on 30 September 1726. In 1729 and 1741 he was a censor, and a Harveian orator in 1735. He was elected Fellow of the Royal Society on 29 January 1730. From 1725 he practised as a physician in London, and was elected physician to St. Thomas's Hospital, and in 1740 appointed physician-general to the army. In April 1731 he was appointed physician-extraordinary to Queen Caroline of Ansbach; and soon became physician in ordinary, and physician to Frederick, Prince of Wales. He became physician extraordinary to George II on the queen's death in 1737 and physician in ordinary 1742.

In 1736 John Fothergill became his pupil. When Henry Pelham had lost two sons by sore throat in 1739, Wilmot preserved the life of his wife, Lady Catharine Pelham, by lancing her throat. In March 1751, with Matthew Lee, he attended Frederick, Prince of Wales, in his last illness; and does not seem to have anticipated his death. Archbishop Thomas Herring was his patient in a serious attack of pleurisy in 1753.

== Later life ==
He was created a baronet on 15 February 1759. On the death of George II, Wilmot, with John Ranby, acquainted George III with two wishes which the late king had confided to them: that his body should be embalmed with a double quantity of perfumes, and that it should be laid close to that of the queen. George III at once assented.

Wilmot became physician in ordinary to George III in 1760, left London next year, and lived in Nottingham; but then moved to Herringston in Dorset, where he died on 21 November 1786. He was buried in the church of Winterborne Monkton, where his epitaph remains.

== Family ==
He married Sarah Marsh, daughter of Richard Mead. She died on 11 September 1785, aged 83; her portrait, painted by Joseph Wright, A.R.A., remained in the family, as did a portrait of Wilmot by Thomas Beach. He was succeeded in his baronetcy by his son, Robert Mead Wilmot, and had also two daughters, Ann(e) and Jane, who both married.

Baronetage of Great Britain
New creation	Baronet (of Chaddesden); 1759–1786	Succeeded by Robert Mead Wilmot
