= James Alderson =

English physician

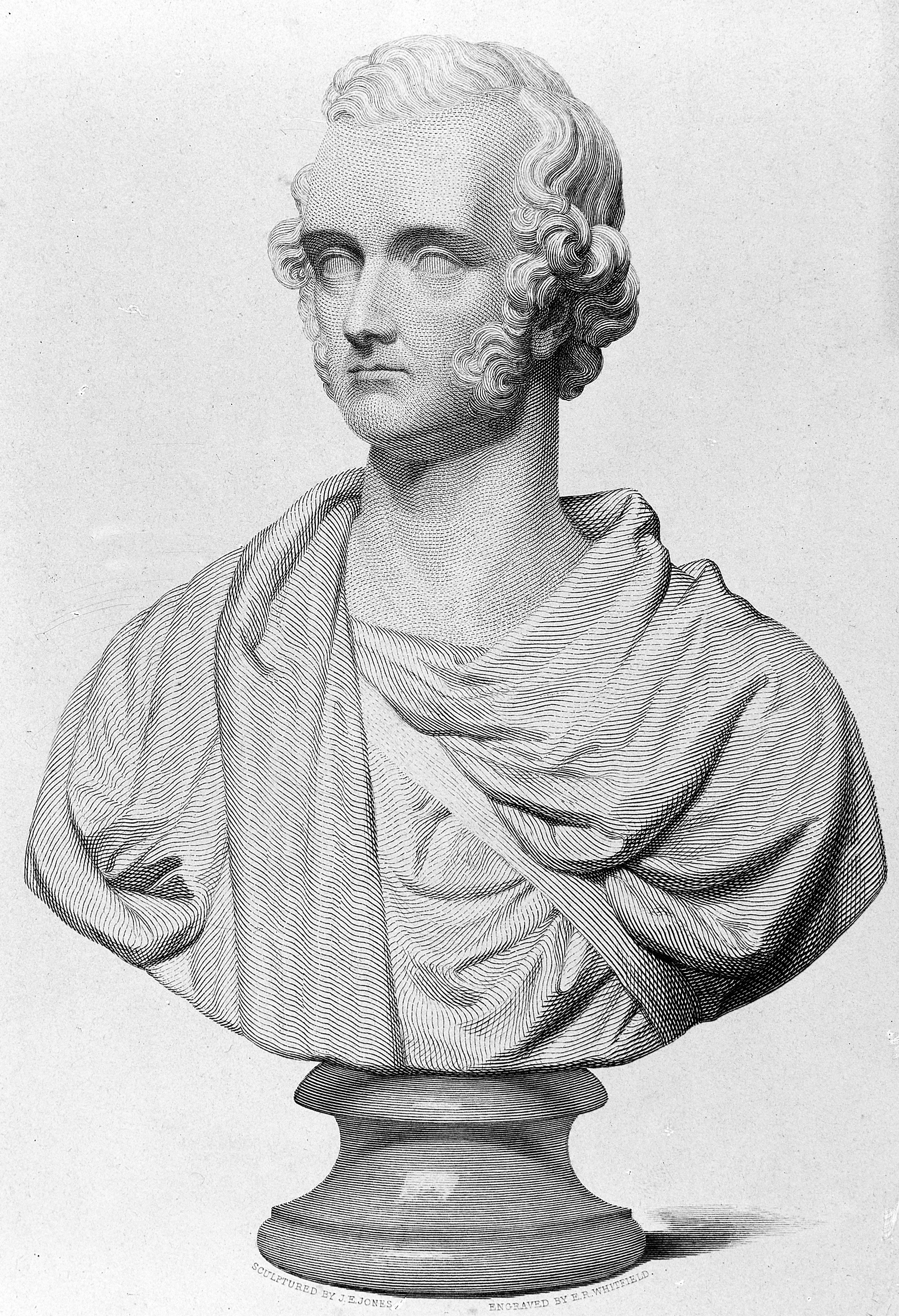
James Alderson

Sir James Alderson FRS (30 December 1794 – 13 September 1882) was an English physician born and based in Kingston upon Hull. He was President of the Royal College of Physicians.

== Biography ==
Alderson was the younger son of John Alderson. He received his early education at the school of Dr. Lee, a dissenting minister in Hull. While still in his teens he went out to Portugal as clerk to a wine merchant, just before the conclusion of the Peninsular War.

On his return to England he entered Pembroke College, Cambridge in 1818. He took his B. A. degree in 1822 as sixth wrangler; became a fellow of Pembroke in 1823; M.A. 1825, and the following year he was incorporated at Magdalen Hall, Oxford, as M.B. The degree of M.D., Oxford, followed in 1829.

To the College of Physicians he was admitted inceptor candidate, 26 June 1826; candidate, 30 September 1829; and fellow, 30 September 1830. He settled for a short time in London, and was physician to the Carey Street Dispensary.

On the death of his father he succeeded to a large and lucrative practice in Hull and the neighbouring parts of Lincolnshire and the East Riding of Yorkshire. He was also elected physician to the Hull Infirmary. He manifested a warm interest in promoting the educational movement in the town.

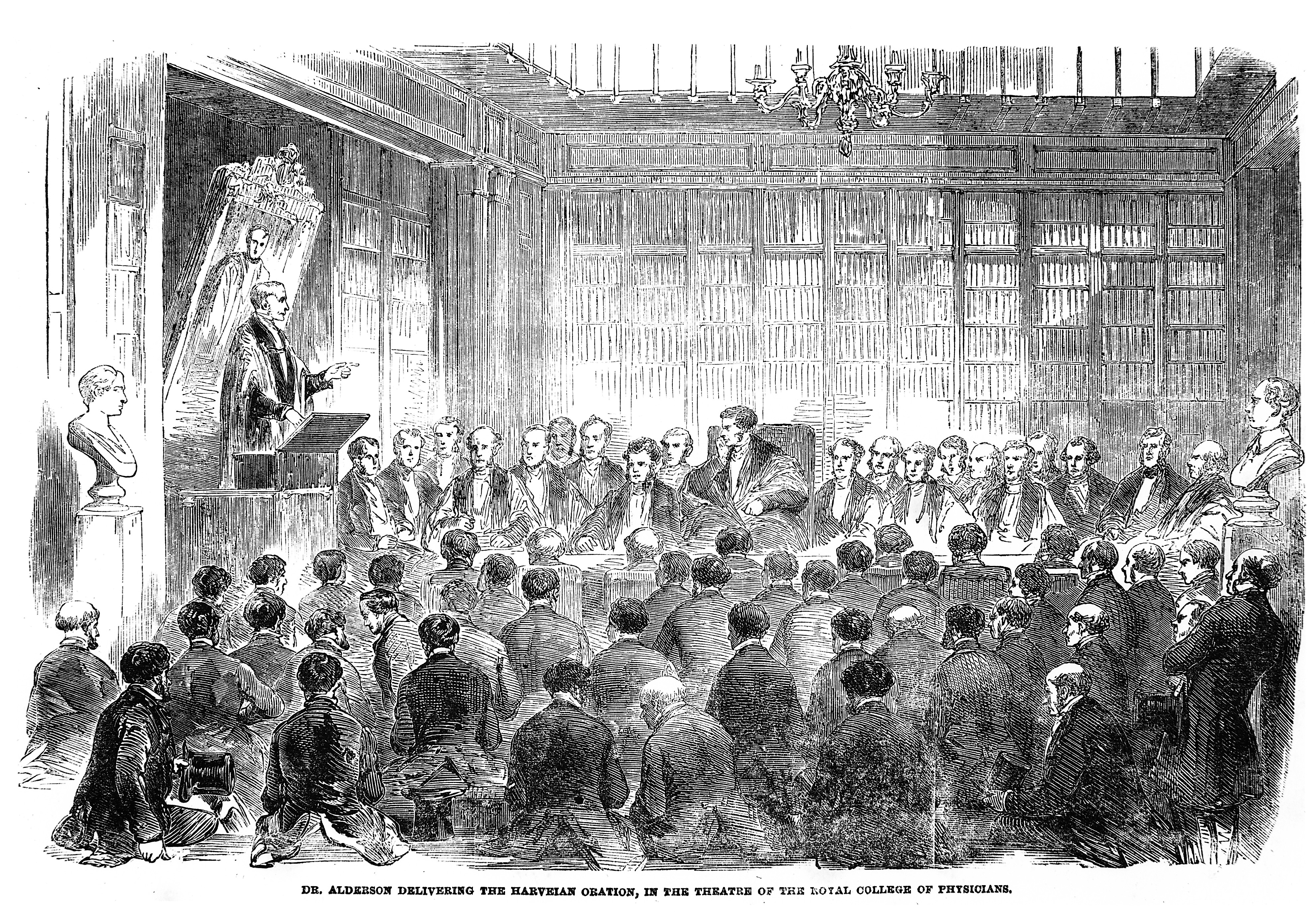
Alderson delivering the Harveian Oration of 1854 in the theatre of the Royal College of Physicians

About 1850 he left Hull once more for London, and settled in Berkeley Square, London. On the foundation of St. Mary's Hospital, Paddington, in 1851, he was appointed senior physician, a post which he held until elected president of the College of Physicians in 1867, when the governors unanimously elected him consulting physician. He was treasurer of the college from 1854 to 1867, and took much interest in its administration, priding himself greatly on unearthing the original charter granted by King Henry VIII, which had long been lost. He held the office of president, to which his urbane manners and pleasing presence seemed to recommend him, on the retirement of Sir Thomas Watson, and retained the chair for four years in succession, retiring in 1870. He was the representative of the college at the General Council of Medical Education and Registration from 1864 to 1866.

He was appointed physician extraordinary to the queen in 1874, having previously, in 1869, received the honour of knighthood.

Sir James was a fellow of the Royal Society and contributed occasional papers to their 'Transactions,’ and to the 'Transactions' of the Medical and Chirurgical Society of London. He delivered the Lumleian lectures in 1852 and 1853, and, what is unusual, was twice appointed to deliver the Harveian oration in 1854 and 1867. In 1865, he was elected President of the now-Royal Medical and Chirurgical Society.

He was an omnivorous reader, and a shrewd observer of men and things, from whom the world of readers might reasonably have expected instruction and amusement. He opportunely met Bishop Wilberforce when the latter was seized by an illness in Italy, and the two travelled homeward together. Alderson had some entertaining reminiscences of the journey, which he was accustomed to relate with great zest.

He published in 1847 a work on 'Diseases of the Stomach and Alimentary Canal,’ in which was embodied the result of his extensive experience in a most important class of diseases.

He died at his home in Berkeley Square and was buried at West Norwood Cemetery.
