= John Parsons (physician) =

English physician

John Parsons (1742 – 1785) was an English physician.

== Life ==
The son of Major Parsons of the Dragoons, who resided in Yorkshire, he was born at York in 1742. He was educated at Westminster School, becoming a king's scholar in 1756. In 1759, he was elected to Christ Church, Oxford, where he matriculated on 19 June. He graduated B.A. 27 April 1763, and M.A. 6 June 1766.

Parsons subsequently studied medicine at Oxford, London, and Edinburgh, with a preference for natural history and botany, and while at Edinburgh in 1766 was awarded the Hope prize medal for the best Hortus Siccus. In 1766 or 1767 he was elected the first professor of anatomy on the foundation of John Freind and Matthew Lee at Christ Church, Oxford. He graduated M.B. on 12 April 1769, and M.D. 22 June 1772.

Parsons was elected reader in anatomy in the university in 1769, physician to the Radcliffe Infirmary 6 May 1772, and first clinical professor on Lord Lichfield's foundation 1780–5. Under his direction an anatomical theatre was built at Oxford. Parsons was admitted a candidate of the Royal College of Physicians on 30 September 1774, and fellow a year later, 30 September 1775. In 1784 he delivered the Harveian oration.

Parsons died of fever on 9 April 1785, and was buried in Christ Church Cathedral, Oxford, where there was a white marble gravestone to his memory. In July 1772, he had married Anne Hough. After his death she married John Grosvenor.

== Notes ==
Attribution

This article incorporates text from a publication now in the public domain: "Parsons, John (1742-1785)". Dictionary of National Biography. London: Smith, Elder & Co. 1885–1900.
