= Mynors Bright =

Mynors Bright (1818–1883) was an English academic, president of Magdalene College, Cambridge, from 1853 to 1873. He was the decipherer of the diary of Samuel Pepys.

== Life ==
Mynors Bright was the son of the physician John Bright, and of Eliza his wife. He was educated at Shrewsbury, and entered Magdalene College, Cambridge, on 3 July 1835. He was a senior optime in mathematics, and took a second-class in classics. He proceeded B.A. in 1840, and M.A. in 1843. He became foundation-fellow, tutor, and eventually president of Magdalene, and was chosen proctor in 1853.

The Pepys Library being at Magdalene, Bright resolved to re-decipher the whole of Pepys' 'Diary,' and to this end he learnt the cipher from Thomas Shelton's Tachygraphy. In 1873 he retired from Magdalene, and left Cambridge for London. His Pepys was printed between 1875 and 1879, and was published simultaneously in quarto and octavo, six volumes each. The edition included engravings of William Faithorne's Map of London, 1658, and John Evelyn's Posture of the Dutch Fleet, 1667. It corrected numerous errors occurring in the original decipherment, and inserted many passages hitherto suppressed but still left only about 80% of the diary in print. A complete reissue of Bright's transcript was edited by Henry Benjamin Wheatley in ten volumes in 1893–1899.

Bright became paralysed about 1880, and died on 23 February 1883, aged 65. He never married, and bequeathed part of his interest in his Pepys to Magdalene College. His portrait was painted by F. Dickenson, and presented by his friends to his college.
