= Charles Goodall (poet) =

English poet (1671–1689)

Charles Goodall (1671 – 11 May 1689) was an English poet. A student of Eton College and then Merton College, Oxford, he wrote a number of romantic and erotic poems referring to male students at said colleges. In 1689, the year of his death, he put together a collection entitled Poems and Translations which contains 33 poems with male-male subject matter, eleven regarding women, and 13 to a mistress named 'Idera' (considered probably imaginary). A number of the homoerotic poems have been rewritten to remove the same-sex subject matter.

Goodall's father—Dr. Charles Goodall—was a London physician.
