= Samuel Collins (physician, born 1617) =

English physician

- Born: 1617; Tring, England
- Died: 1685 (aged 67–68)
- Occupation: Physician

Samuel Collins (1617–1685) was an English physician.

== Biography ==
Collins was the son of Daniel Collins, vice-provost of Eton, and rector of Cowley, Middlesex. He was born in 1617 at Tring, Hertfordshire, and educated at Eton, whence he was elected to a scholarship at King's College, Cambridge, in 1634. He was elected a fellow of that house in 1637, proceeded B. A. in 1638, and on 1 June 1639 was entered on the physic line at Leyden. He commenced M.A. at Cambridge in 1642, and was created M.D. by that university 4 October 1648. On 27 July 1649 he was admitted a candidate of the College of Physicians of London, and a fellow on 25 June 1651. Collins was incorporated at Oxford in his doctor's degree in May 1650, and about that time was, by an ordinance of parliament, elected a fellow of New College in that university. He settled in London; was appointed censor of the College of Physicians in 1659, 1669, and 1679; was Harveian orator in 1665, and again in 1682; Gulstonian lecturer in 1675; and registrar from 1682 to his death. He was buried at Cowley, Middlesex, on 11 June 1685.

To him Wood erroneously ascribes the authorship of 'The History of the present State of Russia,' printed at London 1671. The real author of that work was Samuel Collins, M.D. (d. 1670).
