= Edward Palmer Poulton =

English physician and physiologist

Edward Palmer Poulton FRCP
- Born: 1 October 1883; Oxford
- Died: 18 October 1939 (aged 56); Tunbridge Wells
- Occupations: physician and physiologist
- Known for: Poulton's oxygen tent

Edward Palmer Poulton FRCP (1883–1939) was an English physician and physiologist.

== Education and career ==
After education at the Dragon School and at Rugby School, Edward Palmer Poulton matriculated at Balliol College, Oxford, where he graduated in natural science in 1905. Influenced by John Scott Haldane, he studied for two more years at the University of Oxford and then did his medical training at Guy's Hospital, graduating in 1910 with BM BCh and in 1913 with DM from the University of Oxford. In 1911–1912, supported by a Radcliffe travelling fellowship, he studied under Friedrich von Müller at Munich. At Guy's Hospital, Poulton was from 1912 to 1914 a demonstrator of physiology and a registrar, from 1914 to 1926 an assistant physician, and from 1926 to 1939 a full physician. He was elected FRCP in 1918. He delivered the Goulstonian Lectures in 1918 and the Oliver-Sharpey Lecture in 1928.

Poulton's attitude to medicine was largely determined by his knowledge of physiology, and it was in the domain of physiology that he achieved most. Under his influence Guy's became a centre first for research in diabetes and then for oxygen therapy; he himself devised an oxygen tent that was widely used.

He showed how oxygen, when given in sufficient concentration, was of enormous value in many conditions in which it had never been employed. His oxygen tent came into use in the majority of large hospitals, and he arranged a service by which an apparatus could be sent with a skilled technician to a hospital or private house anywhere in the country. This work must have saved countless lives ...

He joined the Physiological Society in 1909. Among his collaborators were John Scott Haldane, Joseph Barcroft, Ernest Laurence Kennaway, John Henry Ryffel, Marcus Seymour Pembrey, and George Graham. Poulton and his collaborators did research on oesophageal pain, dissociation curves of blood, physiological effects of anoxia, and creatinine excretions in dietary modifications.

When Sir Frederick Taylor died in 1920, Poulton became the editor, assisted by C. Putnam Symonds and Harold Wordsworth Barber, for the 12th edition of Taylor's Practice of Medicine (1922) and for three subsequent editions.

== Family ==
Edward Palmer Poulton, the elder son of Sir Edward Bagnall Poulton, F.R.S, Hope Professor of Zoology in the University of Oxford, had a younger brother, Ronald, and three sisters. Ronald Poulton (1889–1915) was a famous rugby union footballer, who died in WWI. In 1911 in Oxford, Edward Palmer Poulton married Elfrida Maclean; they had three sons and two daughters.

== Selected publications ==
- with George Graham: "Possible errors in the estimation of creatinine and creatine by Folin's method". Journal of Physiology. 46: xliv–xlv. 1913.
- Poulton, E. P. (1915). "The Significance of Alveolar Carbon Dioxide Determinations in the Treatment and Prognosis of Diabetes". British Medical Journal. 2 (2854): 392–398. doi:10.1136/bmj.2.2854.392. PMC 2303045. PMID 20767809.
- with Thomas Richard Parsons: Parsons, T. R.; Poulton, E. P. (1923). "The Hydrogen Ion Concentration of the Blood in certain Pathological Conditions, as Determined by the Hydrogen Electrode and the Indirect Methods of Barcroft and Hasselbalch". Biochemical Journal. 17 (2): 341–360. doi:10.1042/bj0170341. PMC 1259351. PMID 16743188.
- Poulton, E. P. (1934). "The Relative Advantages of British and Foreign Health Resorts". British Medical Journal. 2 (3857): 1037–1039. doi:10.1136/bmj.2.3857.1037. PMC 2446141. PMID 20778698.
- Poulton, E. P. (1936). "Oxygen Tents and Nasal Catheters". British Medical Journal. 1 (3924): 567–571. doi:10.1136/bmj.1.3924.567. PMC 2458317. PMID 20779808.
