= Johnny Bright (baseball) =

American baseball player

- Pitcher
- Born: 1888
- Died: June 24, 1908; Cleveland, Ohio

Negro league baseball debut
- 1907, for the Cuban Giants

Last appearance
- 1907, for the Cuban Giants

Teams
- Cuban Giants (1907)

John Bright (1888 – June 24, 1908) was an American Negro league pitcher in the 1900s.

Bright played for the Cuban Giants in 1907. In three recorded appearances on the mound, he posted a 1.61 ERA over 28 innings. Bright died in Cleveland, Ohio in 1908 at age 19 or 20.
