= Richard Tyson (physician, 1680–1750) =

English physician

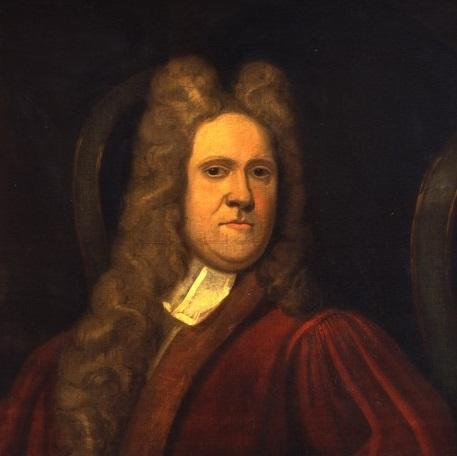
- Born: 1680
- Died: 3 January 1749–50
- Occupation: Physician

Richard Tyson (1680 – 3 January 1749–50) was an English physician.

== Biography ==
Tyson was the son of Edward Tyson, was born in 1680 in Gloucestershire. He entered Pembroke Hall, Cambridge, and obtained a fellowship. He graduated M.B. 1710, and M.D. 1715. He was elected a fellow of the Royal College of Physicians on 25 June 1718, was five times censor between 1718 and 1737, was registrar from 1723 to 1735, treasurer 1739–46, and president 1746–50. He delivered the Harveian oration in 1725. On 27 May 1725 he was elected physician to St. Bartholomew's Hospital. He died on 3 January 1749–50.
