= William Cadogan (childcare writer) =

British physician and writer

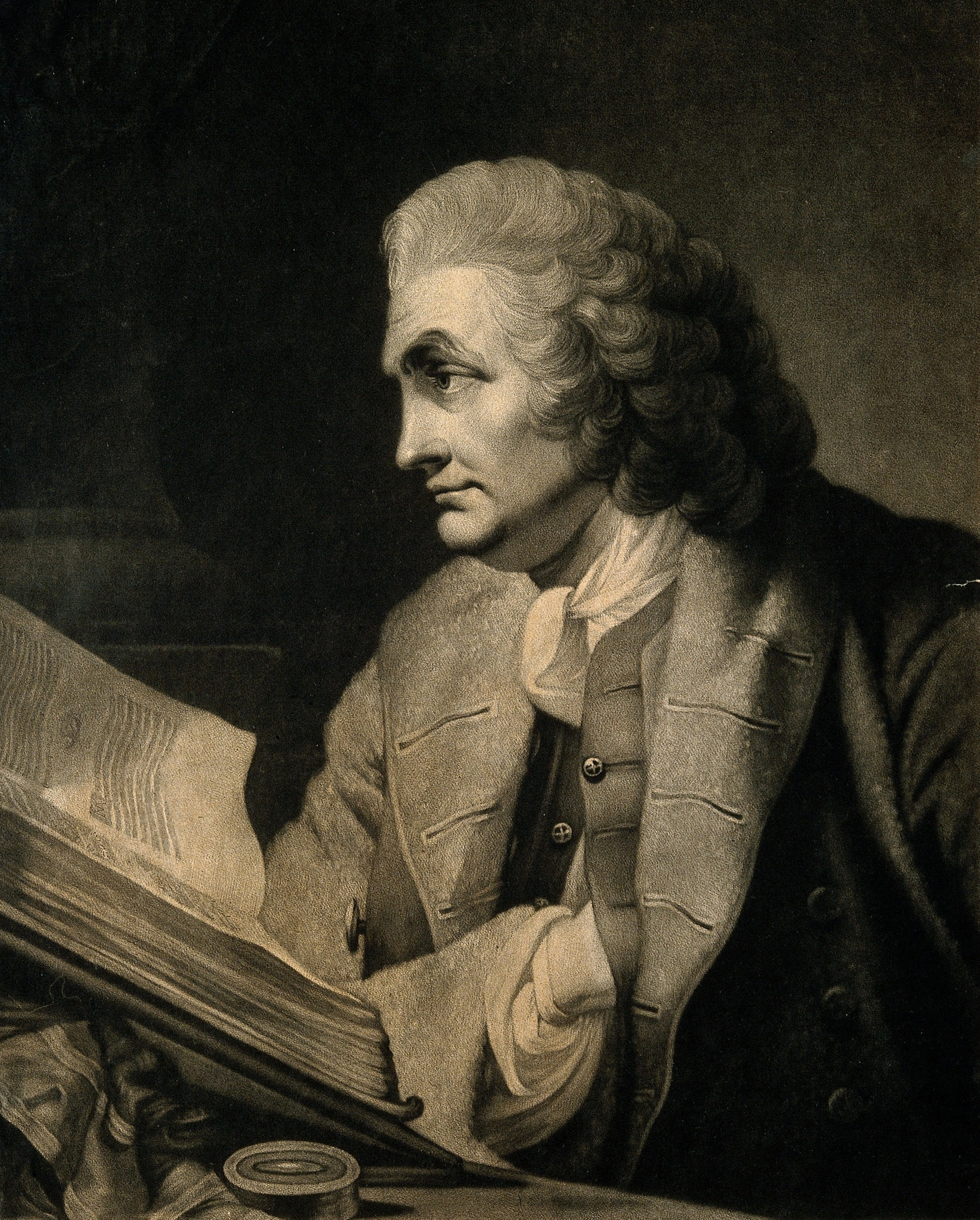
- William Cadogan c. 1769
- Born: 1711; Cowbridge
- Died: 26 February 1797 (aged 85–86); London
- Occupations: Physician, writer

William Cadogan (1711 – 26 February 1797) was an 18th-century British physician and writer on child care and nursing.

== Career ==
Cadogan was probably born at Cowbridge in Wales in 1711. He was educated at Oriel College, Oxford, graduating as MA in 1727. He then studied Physic at Leyden University from 1732, matriculating as MD in 1737. On his return to England he settled in Bristol and married his first wife Frances Cochran. They had one daughter in 1747. (He later married twice more, to a Mrs Spencer and a Miss Groen, but had no further children). He was appointed in 1747 Physician at the Bristol Infirmary.

On 1740s Cadogan became an honorary medical attendant of the London Foundling Hospital for abandoned babies. In 1748 Cadogan published his text An Essay upon Nursing and the Management of Children from their Birth to Three Years of Age based on his experiences with the foundlings and his own children comparing human infants to animal young. By 1748 Cadogan was a prominent London physician famous for his studies of gout. On 28 June 1749 he was elected a Governor of the London Foundling Hospital and in 1752 a Fellow of the Royal Society. In 1752 he moved to live in Hanover Square, London, resigning his post at Bristol and the following year was appointed Physician at the Foundling Hospital. As Physicians had legally to be an MD of Oxford or Cambridge, Cadogan returned to Oxford University to be awarded one in 1755. In 1758 he was elected a Fellow of the Royal College of Physicians and was twice prevailed on to deliver the Harveian Oration. In 1762 he sailed as Physician to the Army to Lisbon, Portugal but was forced by illness (gout) to return home after seven months. In 1764 he published a contentious book on gout in which he blamed the condition on intemperate living.

He died in London in 1797 at the age of 86 and was buried in Fulham churchyard.

== Childcare ==
In the care of children Cadogan advocated simplicity and emphasized encouragement to hardiness, including letting them run in open air with bare feet and letting them use their limbs freely. He wrote against swaddling infants into tight bundles. The infants should be breastfed for at least a year, preferably with the milk of the mother or a good wet nurse, with some solid food after three months. Children should be fed with regular intervals and adults should play with them. Their food and clothing should be light and simple. Adults also should talk with children with adult manner, not with nonsense banter. This should improve children's health and mind and encourage their intellect. Cadogan advocated less regimented childrearing based on nature. He claimed that aristocratic children were suffocated with regimented demands, excess clothing and too much food when poor children grew stronger in harsher conditions. He also emphasized scientific approach to childrearing against what he saw as traditional female superstitions. During the next 25 years the book went through ten editions. It was also translated to several languages. Number of other similar books followed afterwards. Cadogan preceded Rousseau's attitudes to natural and simple living.(please Cite sources)

== Selected publications ==
- A Dissertation on the Gout (1771)
