= John Bright (physician) =

English physician

John Bright (1783–1870) was an English physician.

== Life ==
Bright was born in Derbyshire, and educated at Wadham College, Oxford, where he graduated B.A. 1801, and M.D. 1808.

He at first practised in Birmingham, and was appointed physician to the General Hospital in 1810; but before long he moved to London. He was elected fellow of the Royal College of Physicians in 1809, was several times censor, and was Harveian orator in 1830. From 1822 to 1843 he was physician to the Westminster Hospital.

In 1836 he was appointed lord chancellor's adviser in lunacy, almost his sole duty for many years. He never practised extensively, having a private fortune. He died 1 February 1870, aged 87.

== Family ==
Bright married Elizabeth Mynors; John Edward Bright the barrister and Mynors Bright were their sons.
