= Archibald Gray (dermatologist) =

Sir Archibald Montague Henry Gray KCVO CBE TD FRCP FRCS (1 February 1880 – 13 October 1967) was a British dermatologist and gynaecologist, who was consulting physician for diseases of the skin at University College Hospital and to Great Ormond Street Hospital. Between 1948 and 1962, he was adviser in dermatology to the Ministry of Health. Between 1940 and 1942, he was president of the Royal Society of Medicine. In England, he was first to perform a Wertheim hysterectomy.

Gray endorsed the development of medical mycology at the London School of Hygiene and Tropical Medicine. From 1948 to 1959 he chaired the MRC's Medical Mycology Committee.

Gray was knighted in 1946. In October 1951 he delivered the Harveian Oration.
