= Charles Goodall (physician) =

English physician

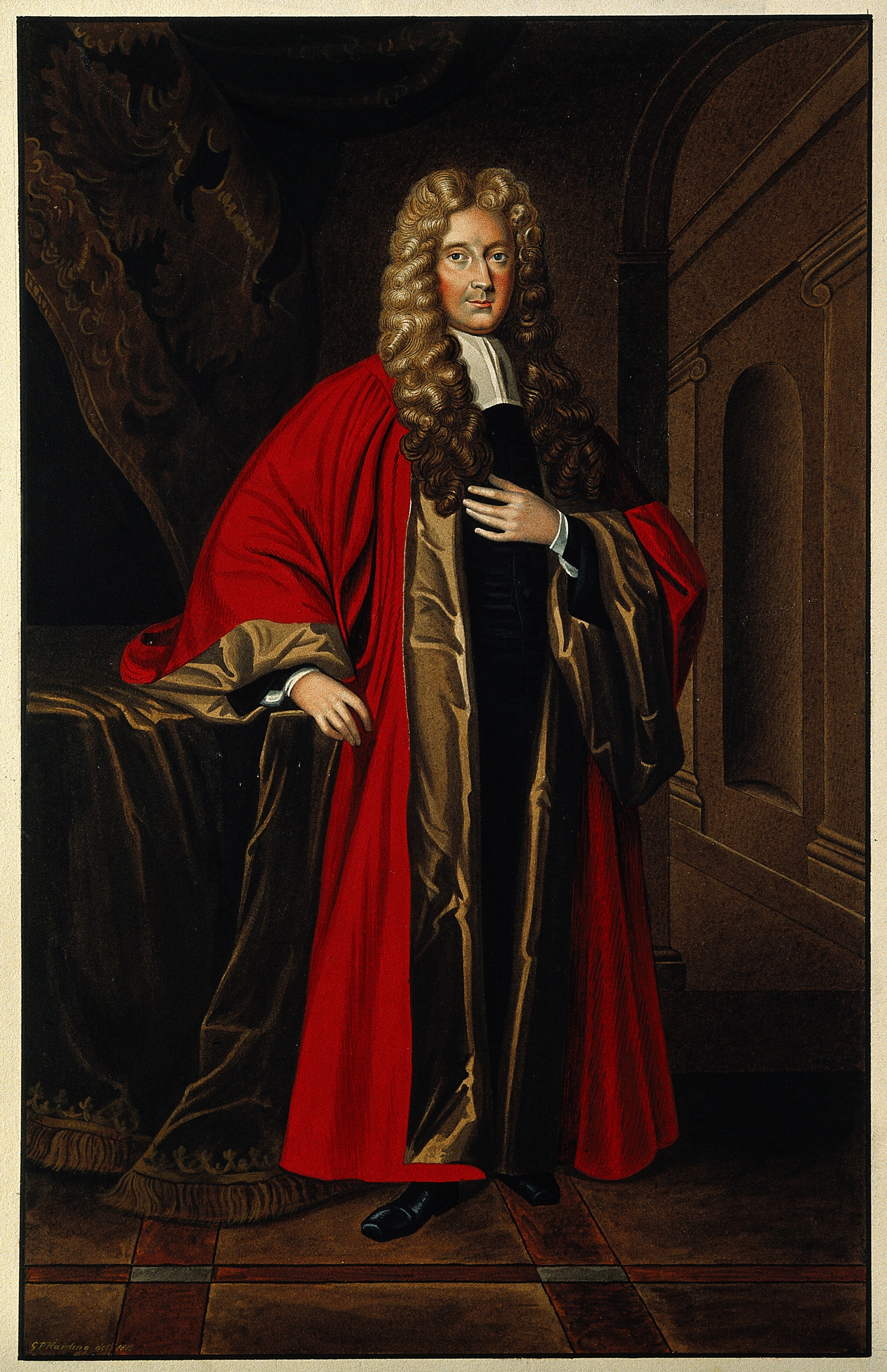
- Born: 1642; Suffolk, England
- Died: 23 August 1712 (aged 69–70); Kensington, England
- Occupation: Physician

Charles Goodall (1642 – 23 August 1712) was an English physician.

== Biography ==
Goodall was born in Suffolk in 1642, studied medicine at Leyden, and graduated M.D. at Cambridge 26 November 1670. He then went to reside in London, attended some of the anatomical lectures of Dr. Walter Needham (The Colledge of Physicians vindicated, p. 66), and was admitted a candidate, a grade corresponding to the present degree of member, at the Royal College of Physicians on 26 June 1676. Earlier in the same year he had published "The Colledge of Physicians vindicated, and the True State of Physick in this Nation faithfully represented." This work is a reply to an attack on the college by Adrian Hyberts, and proves three points: that the College of Physicians was legally established, that it exercised its rights justly, and that it had advanced medical learning in England. The illustrations in support of the last show Goodall to have been well read in the science of his time. On 5 April 1680 he was elected a fellow of the College of Physicians, delivered the Gulstonian lectures there in 1685, and the Harveian oration in 1694 and 1709. He was censor in 1697, 1703, 1705, and 1706, and president from 1708 till his death. In 1684 he published "The Royal College of Physicians of London founded and established by law", and "An Historical Account of the College's Proceedings against Empirics, &c., in every prince's reign from their first Incorporation to the Murther of the Royal Martyr, King Charles the First." These treatises are usually bound in one volume. The first gives an account of all the acts of parliament, royal charters, and judicial decisions establishing the privileges of the College of Physicians. The second, after an epistle dedicatory, which contains excellent brief biographies of the most distinguished fellows of the college of past times, gives details of all the prosecutions of empirics, or uneducated practisers of physic, extracted from the college records, and is of great historical interest. On 28 April 1691 Goodall succeeded Needham as physician to the Charterhouse, and for the rest of his life resided there with occasional visits to a house which he owned at Kensington. He enjoyed the friendship of Thomas Sydenham, of Sydenham's son, of Sir Hans Sloane, and of most of the physicians of his time. He was warmly attached to the College of Physicians, and the manuscript annals bear testimony to his constant attendance at its meetings. He presented the portraits of Henry VIII and of Thomas Wolsey which now hang in the censor's room. Sydenham dedicated his ‘Schedula Monitoria’ to Goodall, and speaks with respect of his medical skill and with warm admiration of his character. A letter from Goodall making an appointment to meet Sloane in consultation at the Three Tuns in Newgate Street, London, is in the British Museum (Sloane MS. 4046), and in the same volume are six other autograph letters of his, all written in a hand of beautiful clearness. One dated 1 September 1709 is from Leatherhead, the others from Charterhouse. On 26 October 1698 he asks to borrow some books, on 28 January 1697 he asks Sloane about two Arabian measures, ‘Zasang’ and ‘Rhoxates,’ and wishes to borrow ‘Agricola, de ponderibus.’ In another he proposes an edition of ‘Sydenham,’ and 9 January 1699 wishes to consult Sloane as to his own health. He married thrice, died at Kensington 23 August 1712, and is buried in the church of that parish. His widow gave his portrait to the College of Physicians in 1713. His combat as Stentor, champion of the College of Physicians, with a champion of the Apothecaries, is one of the incidents of the fifth canto of Garth's ‘Dispensary.’

His son, Charles Goddall, the younger, was a poet.
