= Sir Frederick Taylor, 1st Baronet =

Sir Frederick Taylor Bt FRCS FRSM
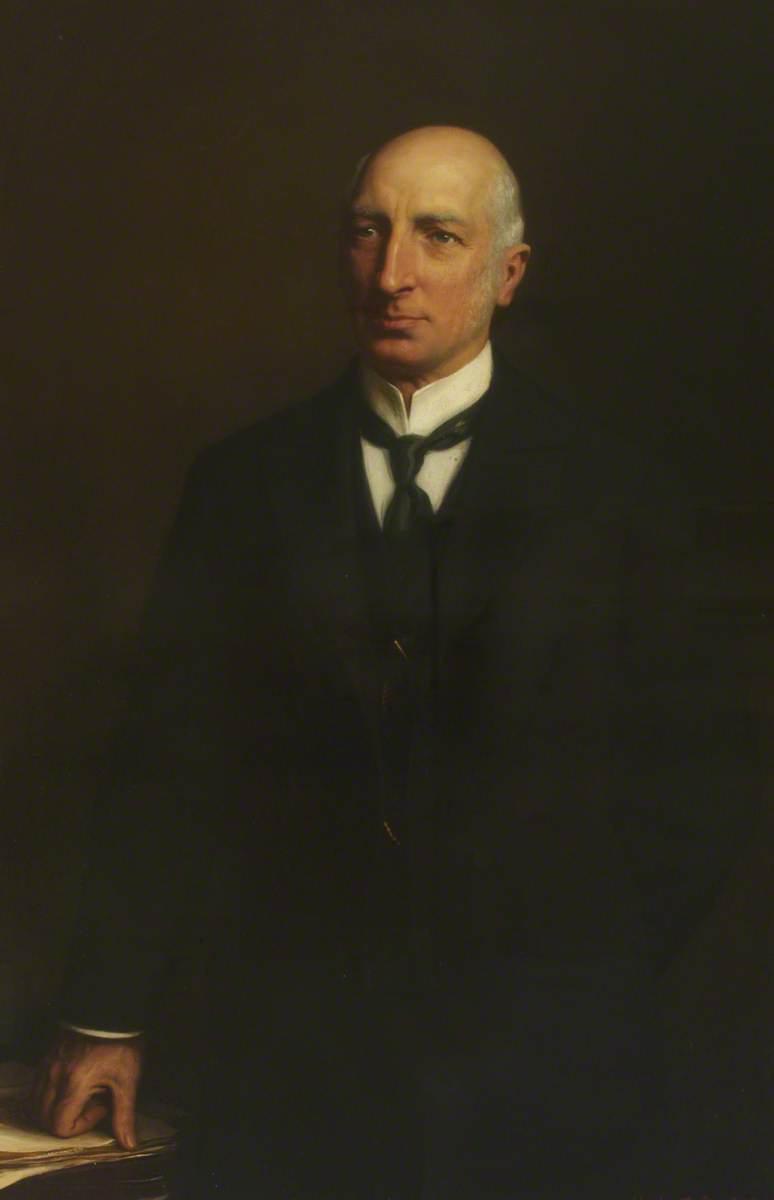
- Born: 6 April 1847
- Died: 2 December 1920 (aged 73)
- Occupation: Physician
- Known for: President of the Royal College of Physicians; President of the Royal Society of Medicine
- Notable work: A Manual of the Practice of Medicine

Sir Frederick Taylor, 1st Baronet FRCS FRSM (6 April 1847 – 2 December 1920) was a British physician and president of the Royal College of Physicians 1915–1918 and president of the Royal Society of Medicine 1914–1916. He was created first Taylor baronet of Kennington in the 1917 Birthday Honours.

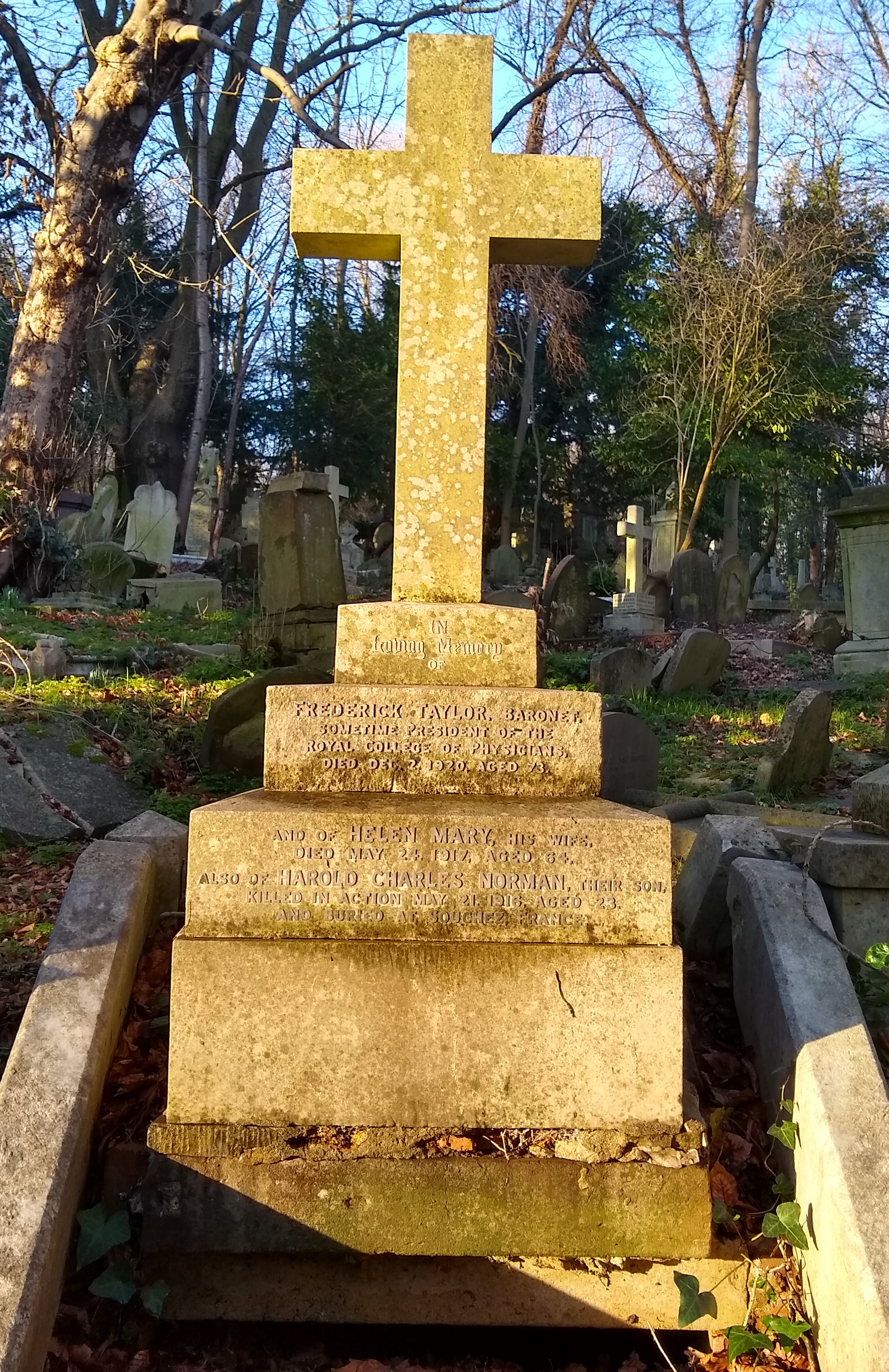
The grave of Sir Frederick Taylor at Highgate Cemetery

== Career ==
Frederick Taylor was educated at Epsom College and at Guy's Hospital, where he graduated MB in 1868. At Guy's Hospital he was appointed in 1870 demonstrator of anatomy, in 1873 assistant physician, and in 1885 full physician, retiring in 1907 as consulting physician. He was the dean of Guy's Hospital Medical School from 1874 to 1888. He received the higher MD degree from the University of London. Taylor was elected FRCP in 1879. The Royal College of Physicians appointed him Lumleian Lecturer in 1904 and Harveian Orator in 1907.

Taylor's reputation is based upon his textbook A Manual of the Practice of Medicine, which was first published in 1890. The 11th edition, entitled The Practice of Medicine, was published in 1918. The 12th edition, published in 1922 after Taylor's death, was entitled Taylor's Practice of Medicine with editors E. P. Poulton, C. Putnam Symonds, and H. W. Barber.

== Personal life ==
On 31 October 1884 in East Rudham, Norfolk, Taylor married Helen Mary Manby; they had two sons and one daughter. His heir was Eric Stuart Taylor, MB BChir Cantab. Taylor's son, Captain Harold Charles Norman Taylor, was killed in action on 21 May 1916 in the Vimy Ridge sector near Arras.

Taylor and his wife Helen are buried at Highgate Cemetery (west side).

Baronetage of the United Kingdom
New creation	Baronet (of Kennington); 1917–1920	Succeeded by Eric Stuart Taylor
