= Stephen Roodhouse Gloyne =

English pathologist

Stephen Roodhouse Gloyne (24 December 1882 – 25 September 1950) was an English pathologist who worked at the London Chest Hospital from 1911 to 1948. There he built up the pathology department almost from scratch. He kept a large animal house, was director of the Barnes Research Department, and expanded the specimen collection started by Peacock. In 1941, during the Second World War, all but 18 of the 400 specimens in the collection were destroyed, causing Gloyne to comment that his life's work had gone up in smoke.

He wrote a biography of the Scottish surgeon John Hunter.

== Selected publications ==
- John Hunter. E. & S. Livingstone, Edinburgh and London, 1950.
