= Harold Wordsworth Barber =

English dermatologist (1887–1955)

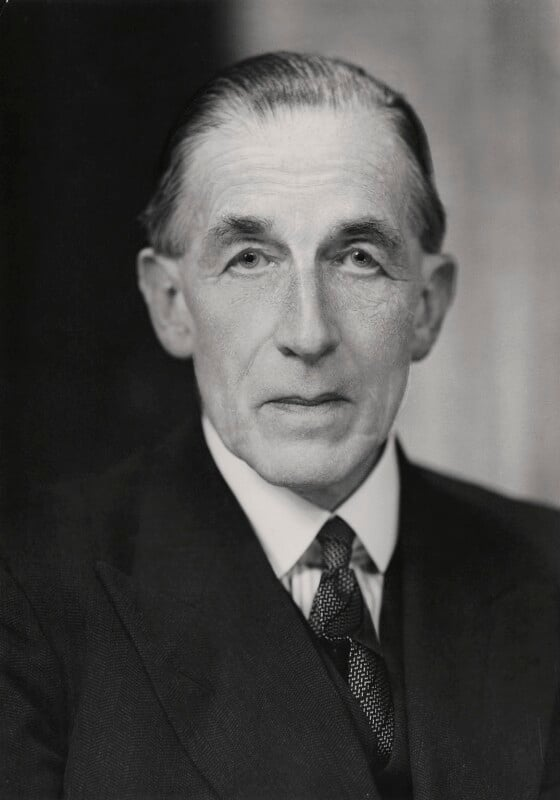
- Barber in 1952
- Born: 18 May 1887
- Died: 14 January 1955 (aged 67)
- Occupation: Dermatologist
- Known for: Barber's palmoplantar pustulosis (Barber's psoriasis)

Harold Wordsworth Barber FRCP (1887–1955) was an English dermatologist.

== Education and career ==
After education at Repton, Harold Wordsworth Barber matriculated at Clare College, Cambridge and graduated there in natural sciences in 1908. After medical education at Guy's Hospital, he graduated in 1911 BCh and in 1912 MB from the University of Cambridge. For the academic year 1912–1913, supported by an Arthur Durham Travelling Fellowship, he studied dermatology for most of a year in Paris under Darier at Hôpital Saint-Louis and then briefly studied in Hamburg under Unna. From 1913 to 1915 Barber was a medical registrar at Guy's Hospital and qualified MRCP in 1914. In 1915 he joined the RAMC and during WWI served in India, Mesopotamia, German East Africa, and France. He returned in 1919 to Guy's Hospital as medical registrar and later in that year was appointed physician-in-charge of the department for skin diseases. He was a consulting dermatologist to the Royal Navy. He remained on the active staff of St Guy's Hospital until 1951 when he became a consulting physician to the hospital's department of dermatology. He wrote the section on skin diseases in the 12th edition of Taylor's Practice of Medicine (1922), edited by E. P. Poulton.

In 1922 Barber was elected FRCP. In 1928, under the auspices of the Medical Society of London, he gave the Lettsomian Lectures on Dermatology in Relation to other Branches of Medicine. In 1932 at the annual meeting of the British Medical Association, he was president of the Association's Section on Dermatology and Venereal Diseases. He was president of the British Association of Dermatology in 1944 and again in 1955. In 1952, under the auspices of the St John's Hospital Dermatological Society, he gave the Prosser White Oration, which was published in the Society's Transactions in 1953.

... he was the first in Great Britain to associate acne with hormones. He used to treat acne with oestrogens long before anyone else. ... He was among the first to use large doses of Vitamin A which he used in the treatment of Darier's disease and pityriasis rubra pilaris.

== Selected publications ==
- Barber, H. W. (17 April 1915). "Two cases of lupus in children". British Medical Journal. 1 (2833): 671. doi:10.1136/bmj.1.2833.671. PMC 2302160. PMID 20767593.
- with Henry Charles Semon: Barber, H. W.; Semon, H. C. (7 September 1918). "Observations on the etiology and treatment of seborrhoeic eruptions". Br Med J. 2 (3010): 245–248. doi:10.1136/bmj.2.3010.245. PMC 2341623. PMID 20769165.
- Barber, H. W. (28 February 1927). "The relationship of dental infection to diseases of the skin". Proceedings of the Royal Society of Medicine. 20 (9): 1421–1430. doi:10.1177/003591572702000963. PMC 2101415. PMID 19985972.
