= Arthur Frederick Hurst =

Sir Arthur Frederick Hurst, a.k.a. Arthur Frederick Hertz FRCP (23 July 1879 – 17 August 1944) was a British physician, and a cofounder of the British Society of Gastroenterology. The society's annual lecture is named for him.

== Biography ==
Arthur Frederick Hertz was born in Bradford to Fanny Mary and William Martin Hertz, a merchant of German Jewish descent. Hertz changed the spelling of his surname to Hurst in 1916. He attended Bradford Grammar School and Manchester Grammar School before graduating from Magdalen College, Oxford in 1904. He joined the staff of Guy's Hospital in 1906 and ran his own private practice before serving in World War I as a consulting physician stationed in Salonika. From 1916 to 1918, Hurst led the neurology department at Netley Hospital. Seale-Hayne College was repurposed as a military hospital that same year. Hurst moved there to help with treatment of shell shock, working at Netley until 1919. After the war, Hurst relocated his private practice to Windsor and retired in 1939. Upon his retirement, Hurst became a consulting physician and served on Guy's Hospital board of governors. Hurst was knighted in 1937 six years after his older brother Gerald Berkeley Hurst. He died in Birmingham in 1944, aged 65.

Hurst was married to New Zealander Cushla Harriette Riddiford from 2 October 1912 to his death on 17 August 1944. They had three children, a son and two daughters.
