= Goulstonian Lecture =

17th Century lecture series for physicians

Goulstonian lecture
- Awarded for: Prize lecture
- Sponsored by: Royal College of Physicians
- Date: Started in 1639
- Location: London
- Named after: Theodore Goulston
- Website: rcp.ac.uk

The Goulstonian Lectures are an annual lecture series given on behalf of the Royal College of Physicians in London. They began in 1639. The lectures are named for Theodore Goulston (or Gulston, died 1632), who founded them with a bequest. By his will, dated 26 April 1632, he left £200 to the College of Physicians of London to found a lectureship, to be held in each year by one of the four youngest doctors of the college. These lectures were annually delivered from 1639, and have continued for more than three centuries. Up to the end of the 19th century, the spelling Gulstonian was often used. In many cases the lectures have been published.

Gulston's widow bequeathed the annual donation to the College of Physicians for them to arrange for one of the four youngest doctors to "read the lecture on some dead body (if it could be procured), to be dissected as the President and Elects should think necessary for the diseases to be treated of; the lecture to be read yearly, between Christmas and Easter, on three days together; and the reader to treat of three or more diseases, as the seniors of the College should direct; ten pounds to be paid to the doctor who should read, and two pounds to the dissector and for burying the body".

== Lecturers (incomplete list) ==
=== 17th century ===
- 1639 William Rant, De morbis partium quibus optime doctissimeque se gessit
- 1640 Francis Glisson
- 1641 Thomas Sheaf
- 1642 George Ent
- 1644 John Micklethwaite
- 1645 Assuerus Regimorter, De Capite
- 1647 Baldwin Hamey
- 1648 Jonathan Goddard
- 1649 Edward Emily, De Atomis
- 1650 Edmund Trench.
- 1653 Thomas Wharton
- 1654 Christopher Merret
- 1675 Samuel Collins.
- 1684 William Dawkins.
- 1685 Charles Goodall.
- 1693 Humphrey Ridley, On the Brain.
- 1694 Samuel Garth De Respiratione
- 1695 Barnham Soame.

=== 1701–1800 ===
- 1704 John Branthwait, de Hepate
- 1707 George Colebrook, On the Vessels of the Thorax
- 1710 John Woodward, On the Bile and its Uses
- 1711 Henry Plumtre De Ventre infimo, de morbo hypochondriaco, colica et iliaca passione
- 1718 John Freind
- 1719
- 1720 Stephen Chase.
- 1721 Pierce Dod
- 1722 William Stukeley, The Spleen: its Description, History, Use and Diseases
- 1723
- 1725 William Rutty Urinary Tract and its Diseases
- 1727 William Wood, A mechanical essay upon the heart
- 1728 Jonathan Grouldsmith.
- 1732 Francis Clifton
- 1734 Frank Nicholls, On the Structure of the Heart and the Circulation of the Blood
- 1736 Frank Nicholls, On the Urinary Organs, with the Causes, Symptoms, and Cure of Stone
- 1737 Benjamin Hoadly, The organs of respiration
- 1738 Robert Bankes,
- 1739 Charles Cotes
- 1740 William Bedford
- 1741 James Hawley
- 1742
- 1745 Thomas Lawrence
- 1746
- 1749 William Heberden the elder on Poisons
- 1750 Robert Taylor
- 1751 William Mushet
- 1752 William Pitcairn
- 1753 Robert Watson
- 1754
- 1755 Mark Akenside
- 1756 Nicholas Munckley
- 1757 Anthony Addington
- 1758 Richard Brocklesby
- 1759 Noah Thomas
- 1760 Thomas Gisborne.
- 1761
- 1763 Thomas Healde
- 1764 Richard Warren
- 1765 Anthony Relhan
- 1766
- 1767 Swithen Adee
- 1768 John Lewis Petit
- 1769
- 1774 Richard Jebb.
- 1775 Henry Revell Reynolds
- 1776 John Burges
- 1777 Lucas Pepys
- 1778 John Rawlinson
- 1779 Samuel Musgrave Dyspnoea, Pleurisy, Peripneumony, and Pulmonary Consumption
- 1780 Francis Milman, on Scurvy
- 1781 Richard Budd
- 1783 James Hervey
- 1784 John Matthews
- 1785 John Gideon Caulet
- 1786 David Pitcairn
- 1787 Francis Riollet (Riollay)
- 1788 James Robertson Barclay
- 1789 George Fordyce, on the digestion of food.
- 1790 William Austin A Treatise on the Stone, its origin and component parts
- 1791 John Ash
- 1792 William Saunders A Treatise on the Structure, Economy, and Diseases of the Liver.
- 1793 John Latham
- 1794 Matthew Baillie On the Anatomy and Physiology of the Nervous System, in Lectures, and Observations on Medicine
- 1795 Edward Roberts
- 1796 John Hunter
- 1797 Christopher Robert Pemberton
- 1798 Paggen William Mayo
- 1799 Richard Powell, Observations on the bile and its diseases
- 1800 Algernon Frampton

=== 1801–1900 ===
- 1801 Edward Ash
- 1802 Charles Gower
- 1803 William George Maton
- 1804 James Franck
- 1805 George Gilbert Currey
- 1806 Edward Nathaniel Bancroft Essay on Yellow Fever; with observations concerning Febrile Contagion, Typhus, Dysentery, and the Plague
- 1807 Charles Dalston Nevinson
- 1808 Pelham Warren
- 1809 Clement Hue
- 1810 Thomas Young
- 1811 Joseph Ager
- 1812 Richard Simmons
- 1813 Joseph Cope
- 1814 James Tattersall
- 1816 John Noble Johnson, On the pathology of the heart with a view to the consideration of angina pectoris
- 1817 Grant David Yeats Observations on the Duodenum
- 1818 George Leman Tuthill
- 1819 Peter Mere Latham, On morbid anatomy
- 1820 Richard Harrison, On the stomach and on vomiting
- 1821 John Ranicar Park, The Pathology of Fever
- 1822 Francis Willis, A treatise on mental derangement
- 1823 John Elliotson
- 1826 Francis Hawkins Rheumatism and some Diseases of the Heart and other Internal Organs
- 1827 Thomas Watson
- 1828 Francis Bisset Hawkins, Elements of Medical Statistics
- 1829 Edward James Seymour, On the structure and pathology of the ovaria
- 1830 Henry Holland
- 1831 William Prout, The Application of Chemistry to Physiology, Pathology and Practice
- 1832 Peter Mark Roget, On the laws of sensation and perception
- 1833 Richard Bright, The Functions of the Abdominal Viscera
- 1834 George Burrows, Some physiological and pathological observations on the blood and urine
- 1835 Alexander Philip Wilson Philip On the Influence of the Nervous System in Disease
- 1837 Roderick Macleod On Rheumatism in its various forms, and on the Affections of Internal Organs to which it gives rise
- 1838 James Copland, On infection
- 1839 Robert Bentley Todd, Physiology of the Stomach
- 1841 Charles James Blasius Williams, Inflammation increased production and adhesive action of the white corpuscles of the blood
- 1842 Marshall Hall, Mutual relations between anatomy, physiology etc.
- 1843 George Budd
- 1844 George H. Barlow, Children's diseases
- 1845 George Owen Rees, 'On the Blood: principally in regard to its Physical and Pathological Attributes
- 1846 Henry Bence Jones
- 1847 William Baly, Pathology and treatment of dysentery
- 1848 William Withey Gull, On the Nervous System, Paraplegia and Cervical paraplegia – hemiplegia
- 1850 Thomas King Chambers, Corpulence, or excess of fat in the human body
- 1851 Edward Latham Ormerod, Valvular disease of the Heart
- 1852 George Johnson
- 1853 William Jenner, Acute Specific Diseases
- 1854 Francis Sibson
- 1855 Edmund Alexander Parkes, Pyrexia
- 1856 William Senhouse Kirkes
- 1857 Sir Alfred Baring Garrod
- 1858 John Addington Symonds, On headache
- 1859 William Addison, Fever and Inflammation
- 1860 Charles Bland Radcliffe
- 1861 Charles Edouard Brown-Sequard, Paralytic, convulsive and mental affections
- 1862 Frederick William Pavy
- 1863 Frederick William Pavy, On the Amyloid and Fatty Degenerations
- 1864 William Orlando Markham, The Uses of Bloodletting in Disease
- 1866 William Roberts, On the Use of Solvents in the Treatment of Urinary Calculi and Gravel
- 1867 Reginald Southey, The nature and affinities of tubercle
- 1868 John Harley, Physiological Actions and Therapeutic uses of Conium, Belladonna, Hyoscyamus, alone and in combination with Opium
- 1869 John Hughlings Jackson, On certain points in the study and classification of diseases of the nervous system
- 1870 Henry Maudsley, Body and Mind
- 1871 Samuel Gee, The Heat of the Body
- 1873 Robert Liveing, Elephantiasis Graecorum, or True Leprosy
- 1874 Joseph Frank Payne, On the origin and relations of new growths
- 1875 Robert James Lee, Puerperal Fever
- 1876 Augustus Burke Shepherd, Natural History of Pulmonary Consumption
- 1877 Thomas Lauder Brunton, Pharmacology and its Relation to Therapeutics
- 1878 David Ferrier, On the localisation of cerebral diseases
- 1880 William Richard Gowers, On Epilepsy
- 1881 Sidney Coupland, Anaemia
- 1882 Joseph Fayrer, On the climate and fevers of India
- 1883 James Matthews Duncan, On sterility in woman
- 1884 Thomas Clifford Allbutt, Visceral Neuroses
- 1885 William Osler, Malignant Endocarditis
- 1886 Seymour John Sharkey, Spasm in Chronic Nerve Disease
- 1887 Donald MacAlister, Nature of Fever
- 1888 William Julius Mickle, Insanity in Relation to Aortic and Cardiac Diseases
- 1889 Howard Henry Tooth, Secondary Degeneration of the Spinal Cord
- 1890 George Newton Pitt, Some Cerebral Lesions
- 1891 Thomas Oliver, Lead Poisoning in its Acute and Chronic Manifestations
- 1892 Sidney Martin, Chemical Pathology of Diphtheria
- 1893 William Dobinson Halliburton, Chemical Physiology of the Animal Cell
- 1894 Paul Morgan Chapman, Physics of the Circulation
- 1895 Humphry Rolleston, On the suprarenal bodies
- 1896 Patrick Manson, Life-History of the Malaria Germ Outside the Human Body
- 1897 Arthur Pearson Luff, On the Chemistry and Pathology of Gout
- 1898 Sir John Rose Bradford Bt, Observations on the Pathology of the Kidneys
- 1899 George Redmayne Murray, The Pathology of the Thyroid Gland
- 1900 Percival Horton-Smith-Hartley, the Typhoid Bacillus and Typhoid Fever

=== 1901–2000 ===
- 1901 Henry Head, Certain Mental States Associated with Visceral Disease in the Sane
- 1902 George Frederic Still, Some abnormal psychical conditions in children
- 1903 Albert Sidney Grunbaum, Theories of Immunity and their Practical Application
- 1904 Sir Robert Hutchison, Some Disorders of the Blood and Blood-forming-Organs in Early Life
- 1905 William Cecil Bosanquet, On Some Considerations on the Nature of Diabetes Mellitus
- 1906 Harold Batty Shaw, Auto-intoxication:Its Relation to Certain Cardio-vascular Disorders
- 1907 Farquhar Buzzard, Certain acute infective or toxic conditions of the Nervous System
- 1908 Herbert S. French, The Influence of Pregnancy on certain Medical Diseases and the Influence of certain Medical Diseases on Pregnancy.
- 1909 Alfred E. Russell, Some Disorders of the Cerebral Circulation and Their Clinical Manifestations
- 1910 Joseph Shaw Bolton, Localization of Cerebral Function
- 1911 Arthur Frederick Hurst or Hertz, The Sensibility of the Alimentary Canal
- 1912 Horatio George Adamson, Modern Views upon the Significance of Skin Eruptions
- 1913 Arthur John Jex-Blake, Death by electrical currents and lightning
- 1914 Maurice Cassidy, Rheumatoid Arthritis
- 1915 Gordon Morgan Holmes, On Spinal Injuries of Warfare
- 1916
- 1917 Charles Hewitt Miller, Paratyphoid Infections
- 1918 E. P. Poulton, Modern Views on Diabetes and on the Significance of Acidosis in disease
- 1919 William Whiteman Carlton Topley,On the Spread of Bacterial Infection.
- 1920 James L. Birley, On the Principles of Medical Science as Applied to Military Aviation
- 1921 George Graham, On Glycaemia and Glycosuria
- 1922 Anthony Feiling, The Interpretation of Symptoms in Disease of the Central Nervous System
- 1923 A. Geoffrey Evans, On the Nature of Arterio-Sclerosis
- 1924 Leonard G. Parsons,On some Wasting Disorders of Early Infancy
- 1925 John Alfred Ryle, Gastric Function in Health and Disease
- 1926 Bernard Hart, The Development of Psychopathology and its Place in Medicine
- 1927 Francis Fraser, Dyspnoea of Cardiac Origin
- 1928 T. Izod Bennett, Some problems of nephritis
- 1929 Ernest Basil Verney, Polyuria
- 1930 Donald Hunter, The Significance to Clinical Medicine of Studies in Calcium and Phosphorus Metabolism
- 1931 MacDonald Critchley, The neurology of old age
- 1932 Leslie John Witts, Pathology and Treatment of Anaemia
- 1933 Charles Edward Newman, Physiology of the Gall-bladder and its Functional Abnormalities
- 1934 Edward Charles Dodds ,The Hormones and their Chemical Relations
- 1935 Alan Aird Moncrieff, Respiratory Failure including So-called Asphyxia Neonatorum
- 1936 Robert Alexander McCance, Medical problems in mineral metabolism
- 1937 Derek Ernest Denny-Brown
- 1938 Charles Cady Ungley, Some Deficiencies of Nutrition and their Relation to Disease
- 1939 Harold Himsworth, Mechanism of diabetes mellitus
- 1940 W. D. W. Brooks, The Pathology and Treatment of Pulmonary Tuberculosis
- 1941 Paul Hamilton Wood, Da Costa's Syndrome
- 1942 Max Leonard Rosenheim, Baron Rosenheim of Camden, The Treatment of Urinary Infections (not given)
- 1943 Ronald V. Christie, Emphysema of the lungs
- 1944 Kenneth Robson, Some observations upon the subject of primary pleurisy with effusion
- 1945 Charles Herbert Stuart-Harris,Influenza Epidemics and the Influenza Viruses
- 1946 W. Robert M. Drew [Lecture not delivered]
- 1947 Francis Avery Jones, Haematemesis and Melaena
- 1949 C. J. Gavey, The Cardiology of Old Age
- 1950 Howard Nicholson, Suppurative Pneumonia
- 1951 Hector John Anderson, Tuberculosis of the pericardium
- 1952 J.H. Kellgren, Some Concepts of Rheumatic Disease
- 1953 Douglas Andrew Kilgour Black, Body Fluid Depletion
- 1954 Alan Woodruff, The Natural History of Anaemia Associated with Protein Malnutrition
- 1955 G. M. Bull, The Uraemias
- 1956 John R. Ellis, Changes in Medical Education
- 1957 Raymond Daley, The Autonomic Nervous System in its Relation to Some Forms of Heart and Lung Disease
- 1958 Aubrey Leatham, Auscultation of the Heart
- 1959 Stanley Peart, Hypertension and the Kidney
- 1960 John Badenoch, Steatorrhoea in the Adult
- 1961 Desmond Pond, Psychiatric Aspects of Epileptic Brain-damaged Children
- 1962 Roger W. Gilliatt, Electrodiagnosis and Electromyography in Clinical Practice
- 1963 Thomas Arthur John Prankerd, The Spleen and Anaemia
- 1964 Lord Walton, Muscular Dystrophy: Some Recent Advances in Knowledge
- 1965 Edward James Moran Campbell, Respiratory Failure
- 1966 W. I. Cranston, Temperature Regulation
- 1967 John B.L. Howell, Aetiological and functional diversity in airways obstruction
- 1968 David Nicol Sharp Kerr, Substitutes for renal function
- 1969 Gordon Hamilton-Fairley, Immunity to malignant disease in man
- 1970 Roger Williams, Transplantation of Liver in Man
- 1971 Ian A.D.Bouchier, Gallstone Formation
- 1972 J.Stewart Cameron, Brights Disease Today
- 1973 Michael Rutter, Development of Infantile Autism
- 1974 Gordon Michael Besser, The Hypothalamus as an Endocrine Organ
- 1975 Alasdair Breckenridge, Oral Anticoagulants
- 1976 David Keith Peters, Observations on Nephritis
- 1977 Simon Godfrey, Wheezing disorders of infancy and childhood
- 1978 Anne Ferguson, Lymphocytes and Cell Mediated Immunity in the Small Intestine
- 1979 Stephen R. Bloom, Gut and brain-endocrine connections
- 1980 Lesley Howard Rees, Brain opiates and corticotrophin-related peptides
- 1981 Richard A.C. Hughes, Immunological disorders of peripheral nerves
- 1982 Mark Pepys, C-reactive Protein, Amyloidosis and the Acute Phase Response
- 1983 Paul V L Curry, "Clinical cardiac arrhythmias - the way ahead"
- 1984 Andrew Jackson Rees, Influences on the severity of Nephritis
- 1985 Christopher Bunch, Is Gene Switching a Feasible Approach to the Treatment of Genetic Disease
- 1986 Adrian L Harris, From molecular biology to cancer treatment: cancer medicine.
- 1987 A.M. McGregor, Autoimmunity in the thyroid
- 1988 David Linch, The potential role of haemopoietic growth factors
- 1989 David R. Blake, A radical cause for synovitus - a discussion of oxygen radical and neurogenic influences on inflammation
- 1990 Anthony Michael Heagerty, Vascular changes in hypertension: cause or effect
- 1991 Paul Anthony Weetman, Autoimmune Thyroid Disease
- 1992 Douglass Turnbull, Diseases caused by mitochondrial dysfunction
- 1993 Janet Eyre, Through the looking glass to the garden of live flowers
- 1994 Jayne Franklyn, Clinical and molecular aspects of thyroid hormone action
- 1995 Philip N. Hawkins, The diagnosis, natural history and treatment of amyloidosis
- 1996 Patrick Vallance Exploring vascular nitric oxide in health and disease
- 1997 Paul Stewart Cortisol, hypertension and obesity – "It’s my metabolism, doctor"
- 1998 Hugh Christian Watkins, Hypertrophic cardiomyopathy: lessons from an experiment of nature
- 1999 Christopher P. Day, Who gets alcoholic liver disease: a nature or nurture?
- 2000 John McGrath, Blistering babes

=== 2001 – present ===
- 2001 Patrick H. Maxwell, Oxygen homeostasis and cancer: insights from a rare disease
- 2002 D. E. J. Jones, Addison’s other disease: primary biliary cirrhosis as a model autoimmune disease
- 2003 Michael G. F. Hanna, Neurological Channelopathies: a new field
- 2004 Andrew Catto, Genes, haemostasis and vascular disease – insights into disease mechanisms
- 2005 Neil Gittoes, Pituitary tumours – deciphering pathogenesis and optimising treatment
- 2006 N.Rahman, Finding cancer predisposition genes - successes, challenges and pitfalls
- 2007 Rebecca Fitzgerald, Is Prevention better than Cure for Oesophageal Cancer?
- 2008 Matthew David Rutter
- 2009 Geraint Rees, Decoding Consciousness
- 2010
- 2011 Waljit Dhillo, The critical role of kisspeptin in human fertility
- 2012 Srinivasan Madhusudan, Targeting DNA base excision repair for personalisation of cancer therapy
- 2013 Sadaf Farooqi, Defining the neural basis of appetite and obesity: from genes to behaviour
- 2014 Charles Swanton, Cancer Evolution through Space and Time: Causes and Consequences of Cancer Diversity
- 2015 Jeremy Tomlinson, Cushing's revisited: cortisol metabolism and the obesity epidemic
- 2016 Martin R. Turner, Motor Neurone Disease - biomarker development for an expanding cerebral syndrome
- 2017 Gideon Hirschfield (planned)
- 2018 Miratul Muqit, A unifying theory on Parkinson's disease
- 2019 Mona Bafadhel Eosinophils in COPD: A breakthrough in patient management (Feb 2019)
- 2020 Sarosh Irani "Defining clinical and molecular characteristics of treatable diseases at the neuroimmunological synapse" "Oxford Clinician Scientist Receives Prestigious Medical Prize".
- 2021 Rickie Patani, Decoding therapeutically targetable molecular events in ALS using human stem cell models
- 2022 Manish Pareek, COVID-19 and ethnicity
- 2023 Lecture was not awarded or delivered
- 2024 Stephen John Sammut, Ending uncertainty: predicting response to breast cancer treatment using tumour profiling and AI
- 2025 Amit Sud, Precision oncology – the best medicine for everyone?

== See also ==
- Bradshaw Lecture
- Fitzpatrick Lecture
- Harveian Oration
- Hunterian Oration
- Lumleian Lectures
- Milroy Lectures
