= William Cecil Bosanquet =

English physician and classical scholar (1866–1941)

William Cecil Bosanquet FRCP (12 October 1866, Whiligh estate near Wadhurst, Sussex – 24 January 1941, London) was an English physician and classical scholar.

After education at Eton, Bosanquet matriculated at New College, Oxford, where he achieved a first in honour moderations in classics in 1887 and a first in literae humaniores in 1889. He studied medicine at the University of Oxford and at Charing Cross Hospital, graduating with B.M. and D.M. degrees in 1897. At Charing Cross Hospital he was appointed pathologist in 1900, assistant physician in 1903, and full physician in 1913. He also held appointments at Royal Brompton Hospital and originated the Brompton Hospital Reports in 1931. He was an assistant editor for The Practitioner for some years until the end of 1904. He was elected FRCP in 1904. He delivered the 1905 Goulstonian Lectures on Some Considerations on the Nature of Diabetes Mellitus. Bosanquet edited the 10th edition in 1905 of Green's Pathology and Morbid Anatomy.

He edited the 11th edition in 1911, the co-editor with W. W. C. Topley of the 12th edition in 1918, and the co-editor with G. S. Wilson of the 13th edition in 1923.

During WWI, Bosanquet served as captain and then major in the RAMC. He became a staff member of the 4th London General Hospital (which was one of four hospitals in Greater London opened in August 1914) and was afterwards attached to the 44th General Hospital in Deolali, India, serving in 1919 as a consulting physician to the North-West Frontier Force.

In addition to numerous articles in the Lancet and British Medical Journal, he was the author of “Serums, Vaccines and Toxins”(1904), in the second and third editions of which Dr. J. W. H. Eyre was his collaborator, “The Stomach, Intestines and Pancreas” with Mr. H. S. Clogg, his surgical colleague at Charing Cross Hospital (1909), and “Spirochaetes: A Review of Recent Work with Some Original Observations” (1911).

== George Stanley Bosanquet ==
Admiral George S. Bosanquet, A.D.C. (1835–1914) was W. Cecil Bosanquet's father. On 27 October 1884 George S. Bosanquet was appointed one of the naval aides-de-camp to the Queen.

== Selected publications ==
- Bosanquet, W. C. (12 March 1898). "Two cases of subphrenic abscess opening into the lung". Br Med J. 1 (1941): 685–686. doi:10.1136/bmj.1.1941.685. PMC 2410952. PMID 20757697.
- with Ronald E. French: Bosanquet, W. C.; French, R. E. (13 April 1907). "The influence of antituberculous serum on the opsonic index". Br Med J. 1 (2415): 862–865. doi:10.1136/bmj.1.2415.862. PMC 2357306. PMID 20763168.
- Bosanquet, W. C. (21 January 1911). "A lecture on theory and practice in the treatment of pulmonary tuberculosis". Br Med J. 1 (2612): 124–128. doi:10.1136/bmj.1.2612.124. PMC 2332878. PMID 20765410.
- Spirochaetes: a review of recent work with some original observations. W. B. Saunders. 1911.
- Meditatio Medici: a Doctor's Philosophy of Life. 1937.
