= Richard Powell (physician) =

English physician

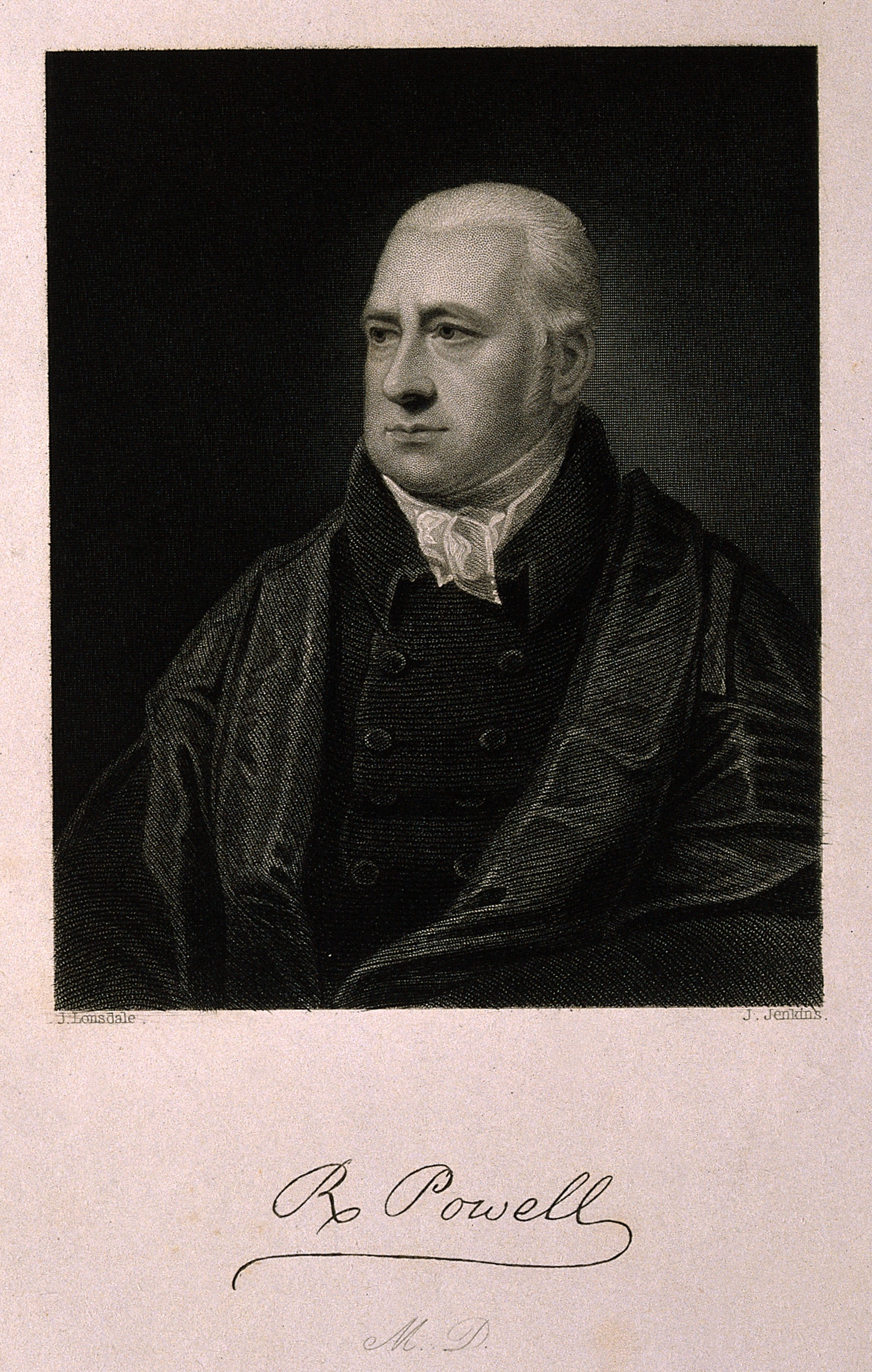
- Born: 1767
- Died: 18 August 1834 (aged 66–67); London
- Occupation: Physician

Richard Powell (1767 – 18 August 1834) was an English physician.

== Biography ==
Powell was the son of Joseph Powell of Thame, Oxfordshire. He was baptised on 11 May 1767, and in 1781 was elected a scholar at Winchester. He entered Pembroke College, Oxford, on 19 January 1785, but subsequently migrated to Merton College, where he graduated B.A. 23 October 1788, M.A. 31 October 1791, M.B. 12 July 1792, and M.D. 20 January 1795. He studied medicine at St. Bartholomew's Hospital, and was one of the founders of the Literary and Philosophical Society there, which was afterwards named the Abernethian Society. He was elected a fellow of the Royal College of Physicians 30 September 1796, and in 1799 delivered there the Gulstonian lectures. They were published in 1800, under the title of ‘Observations on the Bile and its Diseases, and on the Œconomy of the Liver,’ and show careful observation and sound judgment. The method of clinical examination of the liver which he proposes is excellent; and he is the first English medical writer who demonstrates that gallstones may remain fixed in the neck of the gall-bladder, or even obliterate its cavity, without well-marked symptoms or serious injury to the patient. On the resignation of Dr. Richard Budd, he was, on 14 August 1801, elected physician to St. Bartholomew's Hospital, an office which he retained till 1824. He was a censor at the College of Physicians in 1798, 1807, 1820, and 1823; was Lumleian lecturer from 1811 to 1822; and delivered the Harveian oration in 1808. He had considerable chemical knowledge, and published ‘Heads of Lectures on Chemistry’ in 1796. He was one of the revisers of the ‘Pharmacopœia Londinensis’ in 1809, and published a translation of that edition. On 30 September 1808 he was appointed secretary to the commissioners for regulating madhouses, and on 13 April 1810 he read, at the College of Physicians, ‘Observations upon the Comparative Prevalence of Insanity at Different Periods,’ afterwards published in the ‘Medical Transactions of the College of Physicians of London,’ vol. iv. In the same volume he published ‘Observations on the Internal Use of Nitrate of Silver,’ in which he recommends its use in chorea and in epilepsy, an opinion which he modified in a subsequent paper on further cases of the same diseases, read on 17 April 1815. On 20 December 1813 he read ‘Observations upon some cases of Paralytic Affection’ (Medical Transactions, vol. v.), in which simple facial palsy was for the first time described. Sir Charles Bell, in the course of his researches on the nervous system, afterwards redescribed and explained this affection; but the credit of its first clinical description belongs to Powell, who also initiated a method of treatment by warm applications which became commonly used, and is often efficacious. In the following year (2 Dec.) he read ‘Some Cases illustrative of the Pathology of the Brain,’ a description of thirteen cases of interest. In the course of the paper he describes several diseases which have since become well known, but had then scarcely been noticed—such as hæmatoma of the dura mater, meningitis following necrosis of the walls of the inner ear, and new growth of the pituitary gland. On 7 May 1818 he read a paper ‘On certain Painful Affections of the Alimentary Canal’ (Med. Trans. vi. 106), which describes a variety of acute but recurring enteric inflammation associated with the formation of flakes of false membrane. He also published an account of a case of hydrophobia. He gave some attention to the study of the history of St. Bartholomew's Hospital; and on 27 November 1817 a letter from him to Dr. William George Maton was read, describing the most ancient charter preserved in the hospital and its seal. He printed for the first time the whole text of this charter (Archæologia, vol. xix.), which is a grant from Rahere in 1137. Powell lived in Bedford Place, London, for some years, and, after he retired from practice, in York Terrace, Regent's Park, where he died on 18 August 1834. His portrait was hung in the committee-room of St. Bartholomew's Hospital.
