= Blood cell =

Cell produced by hematopoiesis

Blood cells
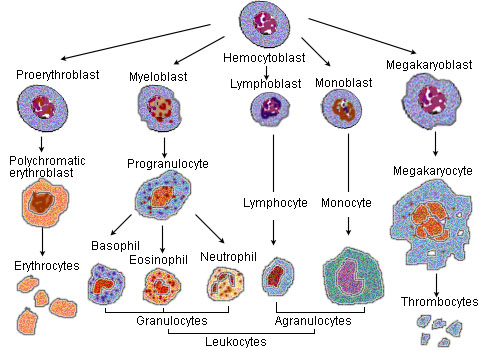
- Diagram showing the development of different blood cells from hematopoietic stem cells to mature cells.

Details
- System: Circulatory system, Immune system
- Function: Oxygen transport, defense, tissue repair

Identifiers
- MeSH: D001773
- FMA: 62844

A blood cell (also called a hemocyte or hematocyte) is a cell produced through hematopoiesis and found mainly in the blood. Major types of blood cells include red blood cells (erythrocytes), white blood cells (leukocytes), and platelets (thrombocytes). Together, these three kinds of blood cells add up to a total 45% of the blood tissue by volume, with the remaining 55% of the volume composed of plasma, the liquid component of blood.

Blood cells with differentiation potential are called hematopoietic cells; the ones with the most such potential are hematopoietic stem cells.

== Red blood cells ==
Red human blood cells illustration

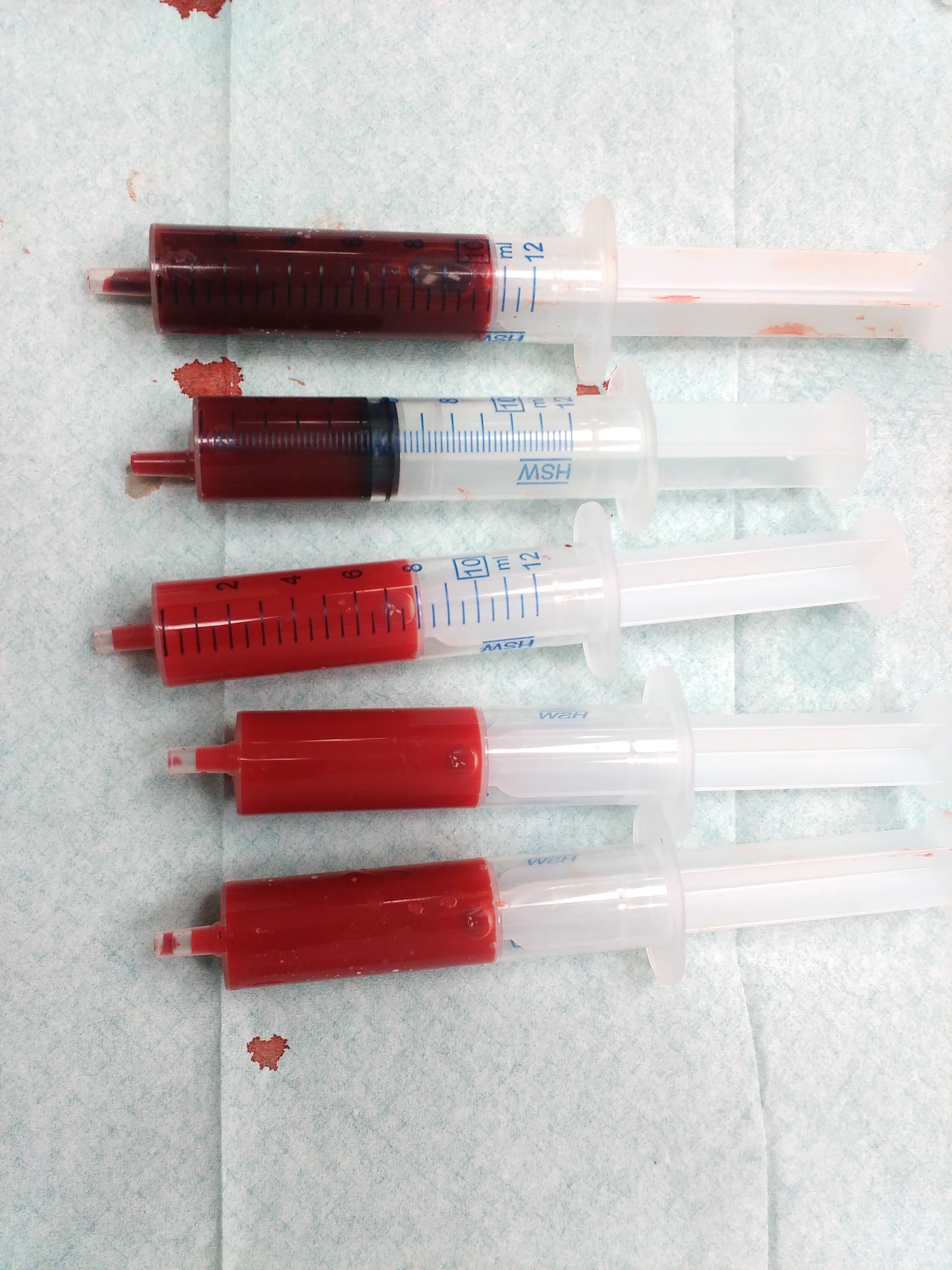
The darker red blood syringes have deoxygenated blood, whereas the brighter red have oxygenated blood.

Red blood cells or erythrocytes primarily carry oxygen and collect carbon dioxide through the use of hemoglobin. Hemoglobin is an iron-containing protein that gives red blood cells their color and facilitates transportation of oxygen from the lungs to tissues and carbon dioxide from tissues to the lungs to be exhaled. Red blood cells are the most abundant cell in the blood, accounting for about 40–45% of its volume. Red blood cells are circular, biconcave, disk-shaped and deformable to allow them to squeeze through narrow capillaries. They do not have a nucleus. Red blood cells are much smaller than most other human cells.

RBCs are formed in the red bone marrow from hematopoietic stem cells in a process known as erythropoiesis. In adults, about 2.4 million RBCs are produced each second. The normal RBCs count is 4.5 to 5 millions per cu.mm. RBCs have a lifespan of approximately 100–120 days. After they have completed their lifespan, they are removed from the bloodstream by the spleen.

Mature red blood cells are unique among cells in the human body in that they lack a nucleus (although erythroblasts do have a nucleus).

The condition of having too few red blood cells is known as anemia, while having too many is polycythemia.

Erythrocyte sedimentation rate (ESR) is the rate at which RBCs sink to the bottom (when placed in a vertical column after adding an anticoagulant). Normal values of ESR are:

• 3 to 5 mm per hour in males.

• 4 to 7 mm per hour in females.

== White blood cells ==
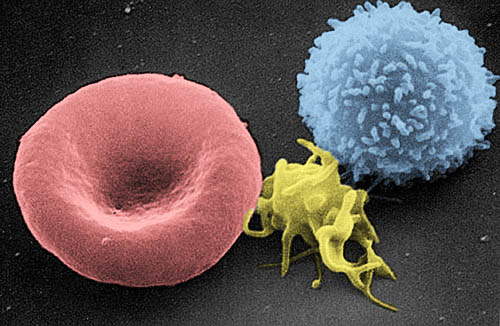
Artificially colored electron micrograph of blood cells. From left to right: erythrocyte, thrombocyte, leukocyte.

White blood cells or leukocytes, are cells of the immune system involved in defending the body against both infectious disease and foreign materials. They are produced and derived from multipotent cells in the bone marrow known as hematopoietic stem cells. Leukocytes are found throughout the body, including the blood and lymphatic system. There are a variety of types of white blood cells that serve specific roles in the human immune system. WBCs constitute approximately 1% of the blood volume.

White blood cells are divided into granulocytes and agranulocytes, distinguished by the presence or absence of granules in the cytoplasm. Granulocytes include basophils, eosinophils, neutrophils, and mast cells. Agranulocytes include lymphocytes and monocytes.

The condition of having too few white blood cells is leukopenia, while having too many is leukocytosis. There are individual terms for the lack or overabundance of specific types of white blood cells. The number of white blood cells in circulation is commonly increased in the incidence of infection. Many hematological cancers are based on the inappropriate production of white blood cells.

== Platelets ==
Platelets, or thrombocytes, are very small, irregularly shaped clear cell fragments, 2–3 μm in diameter, which derive from fragmentation of megakaryocytes. The average lifespan of a platelet is normally just 5 to 9 days. Platelets are a natural source of growth factors. They circulate in the blood of mammals and are involved in hemostasis, leading to the formation of blood clots. Platelets release thread-like fibers to form these clots.

The normal range (99% of population analyzed) for platelets is 150,000 to 450,000 per cubic millimeter. If the number of platelets is too low, excessive bleeding can occur. However, if the number of platelets is too high, blood clots can form thrombosis, which may obstruct blood vessels and result in such events as a stroke, myocardial infarction, pulmonary embolism, or blockage of blood vessels to other parts of the body, such as the extremities of the arms or legs. An abnormality or disease of the platelets is called a thrombocytopathy, which can be either a low number of platelets (thrombocytopenia), a decrease in function of platelets (thrombasthenia), or an increase in the number of platelets (thrombocytosis). There are disorders that reduce the number of platelets, such as heparin-induced thrombocytopenia (HIT) or thrombotic thrombocytopenic purpura (TTP), that typically cause thromboses, or clots, instead of bleeding.

Platelets release a multitude of growth factors including platelet-derived growth factor (PDGF), a potent chemotactic agent, and TGF beta, which stimulates the deposition of extracellular matrix. Both of these growth factors have been shown to play a significant role in the repair and regeneration of connective tissues. Other healing-associated growth factors produced by platelets include basic fibroblast growth factor (bFGF), insulin-like growth factor 1 (IGF-1), platelet-derived epidermal growth factor, and vascular endothelial growth factor (VEGF). Local application of these factors in increased concentrations through platelet-rich plasma (PRP) has been used as an adjunct to wound healing for several decades.

== Complete blood count ==
A complete blood count (CBC) is a test panel requested by a doctor or other medical professional that gives information about the cells in a patient's blood. A scientist or lab technician performs the requested testing and provides the requesting medical professional with the results of the CBC. In the past, counting the cells in a patient's blood was performed manually, by viewing a slide prepared with a sample of the patient's blood under a microscope. Today, this process is generally automated by use of an automated analyzer, with only approximately 10-20% of samples now being examined manually. Abnormally high or low counts may indicate the presence of many forms of disease, and hence blood counts are amongst the most commonly performed blood tests in medicine, as they can provide an overview of a patient's general health status.

== Discovery ==
In 1658 Dutch naturalist Jan Swammerdam was the first person to observe red blood cells under a microscope, and in 1695, microscopist Antoni van Leeuwenhoek, also Dutch, was the first to draw an illustration of "red corpuscles", as they were called. No further blood cells were discovered until 1842 when French physician Alfred Donné discovered platelets. The following year leukocytes were first observed by Gabriel Andral, a French professor of medicine, and William Addison, a British physician, simultaneously. Both men believed that both red and white cells were altered in disease. With these discoveries, hematology, a new field of medicine, was established. Even though agents for staining tissues and cells were available, almost no advances were made in knowledge about the morphology of blood cells until 1879, when Paul Ehrlich published his technique for staining blood films and his method for differential blood cell counting.
