= William Austin (physician) =

William Austin (1754–1793) was a physician and mathematician of extensive practice and the author of "A treatise on the stone", a Goulstonian Lecture.

== Childhood and education ==
He was born at Wotton-under-Edge, in Gloucestershire, 28 December 1754. His forefathers for several generations had been clothiers in the town, William was the youngest of eight children. After receiving a classical education at the local grammar school he was admitted, in 1773, a commoner of Wadham College, Oxford. Here he began the study of Hebrew, and had in a short time made sufficient progress to obtain an exhibition. He became a scholar of his college, and, as he had successfully studied Hebrew to obtain one exhibition, now mastered botany to gain another. His studies in botany determined his choice of a profession in the direction of physic. He made, however, one more learned digression, and, after graduating B.A. in 1776, was elected assistant tutor to Dr. White, Laudian Professor of Arabic. After giving some lectures on Arabic, Austin in 1779 came to London and began his medical studies at St. Bartholomew's Hospital. Percival Pott, the famous surgeon, formed a high opinion of Austin, and said to Earle, his colleague: 'You will see Austin at the head of his profession.' Austin went back to Oxford, and proceeded M.A. 1780, M.B. 1782, M.D. 1783.

== Career ==
In 1781 Austin published the commentary, An Examination of the First Six Books of Euclid's Elements. In the same year, and after he had begun to practice as a physician at Oxford, he lectured on mathematics during the absence of John Smith, the Savilian Professor of Geometry. In 1784 he planned, but did not deliver, a course of lectures on physiology, and in 1785 he was elected professor of chemistry. He became also physician to the Radcliffe Infirmary. In 1786, on a vacancy at St Bartholomew's, Dr. Austin was elected physician to that hospital, and removed to London. He rapidly acquired a large private practice, but continued his chemical studies, and was the first to institute regular chemical lectures in the school of St. Bartholomew's.

In 1790 he delivered the Goulstonian Lectures at the College of Physicians, of which he had been elected a fellow in 1787. The lectures were on the stone, and were published in 1791. The Goulstonian Lectures are printed as A Treatise on the Origin and Component Parts of the Stone in the Urinary Bladder (London, 1791). This work contains a series of experiments made according to the defective chemistry of their time and of no permanent value. Their erroneous result is "that the stone is formed generally in very small part, and often in no degree whatever, from the urine as secreted by the kidneys, but chiefly from the mucus produced from the sides of the different cavities through which the urine passes"; and this led the author to a melancholy conclusion as to a common form of the affection:

Those who suffer this species of the disorder must either bear it for life or submit to a dreadful alternative, to an operation which few surgeons ever acquire the art of performing dexterously, and which, performed even by the most skilful, is by far the most dangerous of any that is practised in surgery.

The imperfect chemistry of his time was sufficient to lead Austin to one accurate conclusion, the variety of composition of hard concretions found throughout the body; and he also points out correctly that the hard matter found in the arteries of old people is calcareous, while the white substance covering the surface of gouty joints is not so.

== Later life ==
He is known to have written sermons, but none of these have been printed, and his short mathematical treatise is not now to be found. Two papers (1788 and 1789) of his on 'Heavy Inflammable Air' were read before the Royal Society (Phil. Trans. lxxx. 51).

His last remark as to lithotomy led his surgical colleague, James Earle, to write a defence of the operation, in which he states that Austin afterwards modified his gloomy views as to the treatment of stone. Earle showed his remarks to Austin shortly before the doctor's death, and is the author of the kindly memoir of Austin prefixed to Practical Observations on the Operation for the Stone, London, 1796.

Dr. Austin was twice married, and left four children by Miss Margaret Alanson, his second wife, as well as two children from his first marriage. He died on 21 Jan. 1793 of a rapid febrile disorder.

William Hayley was a close friend of Austin, and upon Austin's death, William Cowper, who was Hayley's friend, wrote a sonnet memorializing Austin.
