= William Dobinson Halliburton =

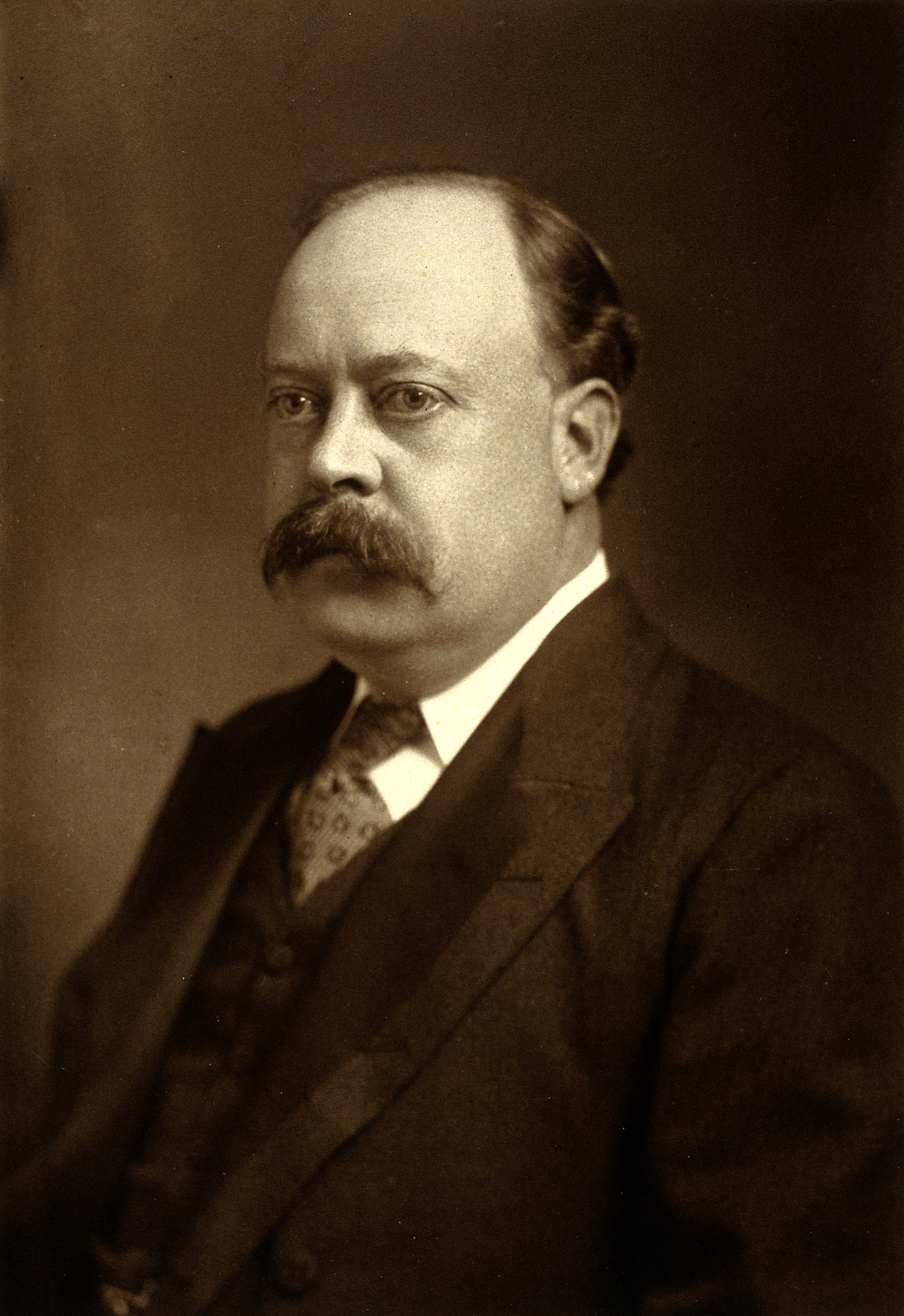

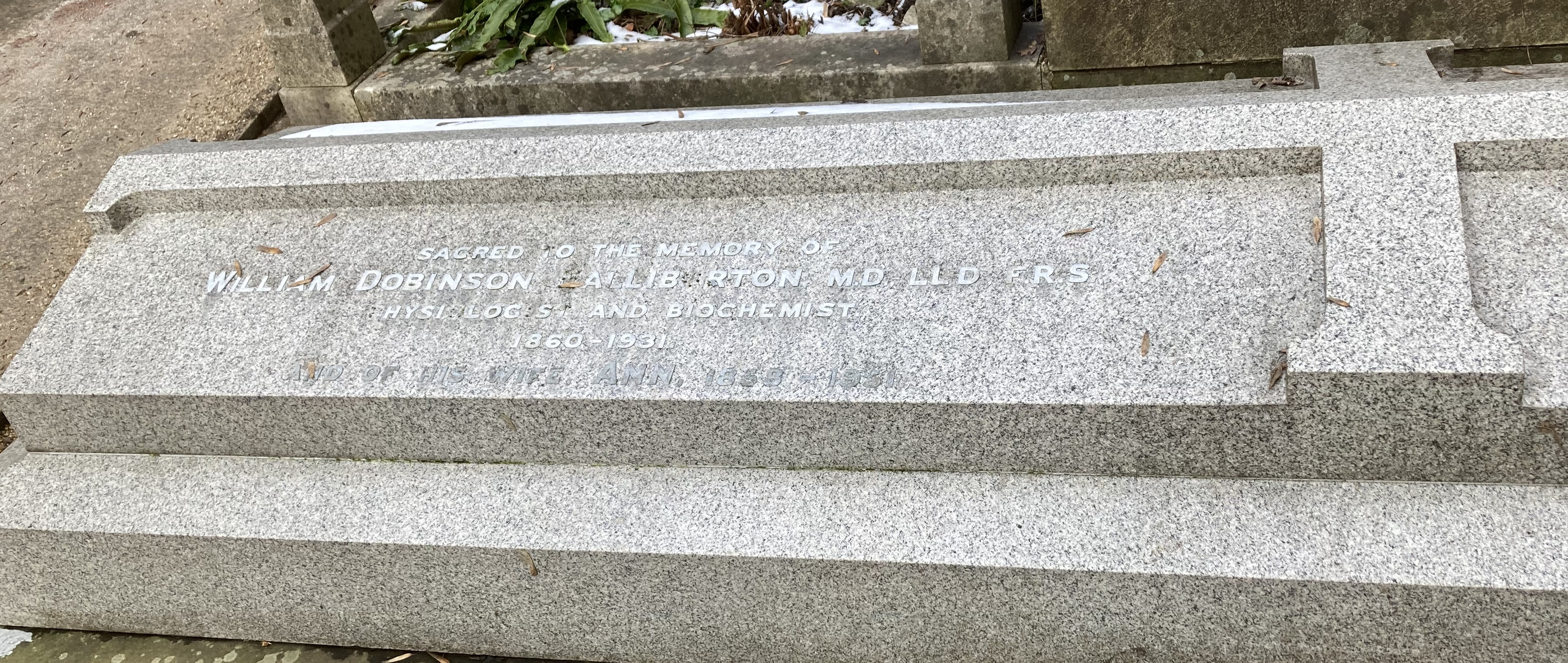
Family grave of William Dobinson Halliburton in Highgate Cemetery (west side)

William Dobinson Halliburton FRS (21 June 1860, in Middlesex – 21 May 1931, in Exeter) was a British physiologist, noted for being one of the founders of the science of biochemistry.

William was one of four children (three sisters) born to Thomas Gill Halliburton and Mary Strachan Homan of Middlesex. He was educated at the University College School and later at the University College London, obtaining a BSc in 1879. On his MRCS in 1883 he was appointed Assistant in Physiology at the University College under Sir Edward Sharpey-Schafer. His MD followed in 1884, his membership of the Royal College of Physicians a year later and his Fellowship in 1892. Halliburton succeeded Gerald Francis Yeo in the chair of Physiology at King's College London in 1889. Over the period of 34 years at King's College he was deeply involved in its administration and was dean of the Faculty of Medical Science for many years. In 1923 his chronic ill-health obliged him to resign from the chair and accept the sinecure of Emeritus Professor.

During his tenure at King's College, he assembled a research team, many of whom later became distinguished clinicians, including such figures as Thomas Gregor Brodie (1866-1916), Frank S. Locke, Sir Charles James Martin (1866-1955), Sir Frederick Walker Mott (1853–1926), Walter Ernest Dixon (1871–1931), Otto Rosenheimde [] (1871–1955) and Corrado Donato Da Fano (1879-1927). He and Rosenheim discovered that cholesterol was not pure, but contained ergosterol which led to the formation of Vitamin D under ultraviolet light. Halliburton's first laboratory was improvised in a disused corridor, but nonetheless became the meeting place of the keenest minds in the infant science of biochemistry. His early research centered on the proteins making up muscle and blood, leading to his election as a Fellow of the Royal Society in 1891. Together with Walter Ernest Dixon he studied cerebral circulation and cerebrospinal fluid. During this time he helped found the Biochemical Society of which he was the sole honorary member.

Halliburton's name was a celebrated one in the field of medical literature. His writings were detailed and lucid, resulting in textbooks which were valued by students all over the world. The first of these was his "Textbook of Chemical Physiology and Pathology" published in 1891, in which he assembled all knowledge of the subject at the time. He rewrote "Kirkes' Physiology" completely in 1896 so that it subsequently, through its numerous editions, became known as "Halliburton's Physiology" and an indispensable reference work for legions of medical students. It became popular enough for an American publisher to flout copyright laws and to publish and sell unauthorised editions.

In early 1903 he gave a series of eight lectures in London. A little later New York University School of Medicine invited him to become the inaugural Herter Lecturer. Using the notes from his London lectures, Halliburton gave twelve lectures in New York in January 1904. He then wrote a book with the lectures in a somewhat different form.

Halliburton died after falling ill on a holiday to Cornwall, which forced him to have an unsuccessful operation at an Exeter clinic. He is buried at Highgate Cemetery.
