= William Mushet =

Irish physician

- Born: 1716; Dublin
- Died: 11 December 1792 (aged 75–76); York
- Occupation: Physician

William Mushet (1716 – 11 December 1792) was an Irish physician.

== Biography ==
Mushet was born in 1716 at Dublin of a Jacobite family, who had fled there from Stirling. He is supposed to have been educated at Trinity College, Dublin, and was entered at Leyden on 26 August 1745 (Peacock, Index, p. 72). Mushet was also a member of King's College, Cambridge, and proceeded M.D. there in 1746, becoming a candidate of the College of Physicians on 4 April 1748 and a fellow on 20 March 1749. He delivered in 1751 the Gulstonian lectures. He was made physician in chief to the forces, and served at the battle of Minden (1759), but declined an offer of a baronetcy for his services in that campaign.

Mushet was intimately connected with the Duke of Rutland, and had apartments for eleven years at Belvoir Castle. He died at York on 11 December 1792. A monument was erected to his memory by his daughter Mary in the church of St. Mary Castlegate, York, with a long inscription written by Sir Robert Sinclair, recorder of York.
