= William Orlando Markham =

English physician and pioneer of cardiology

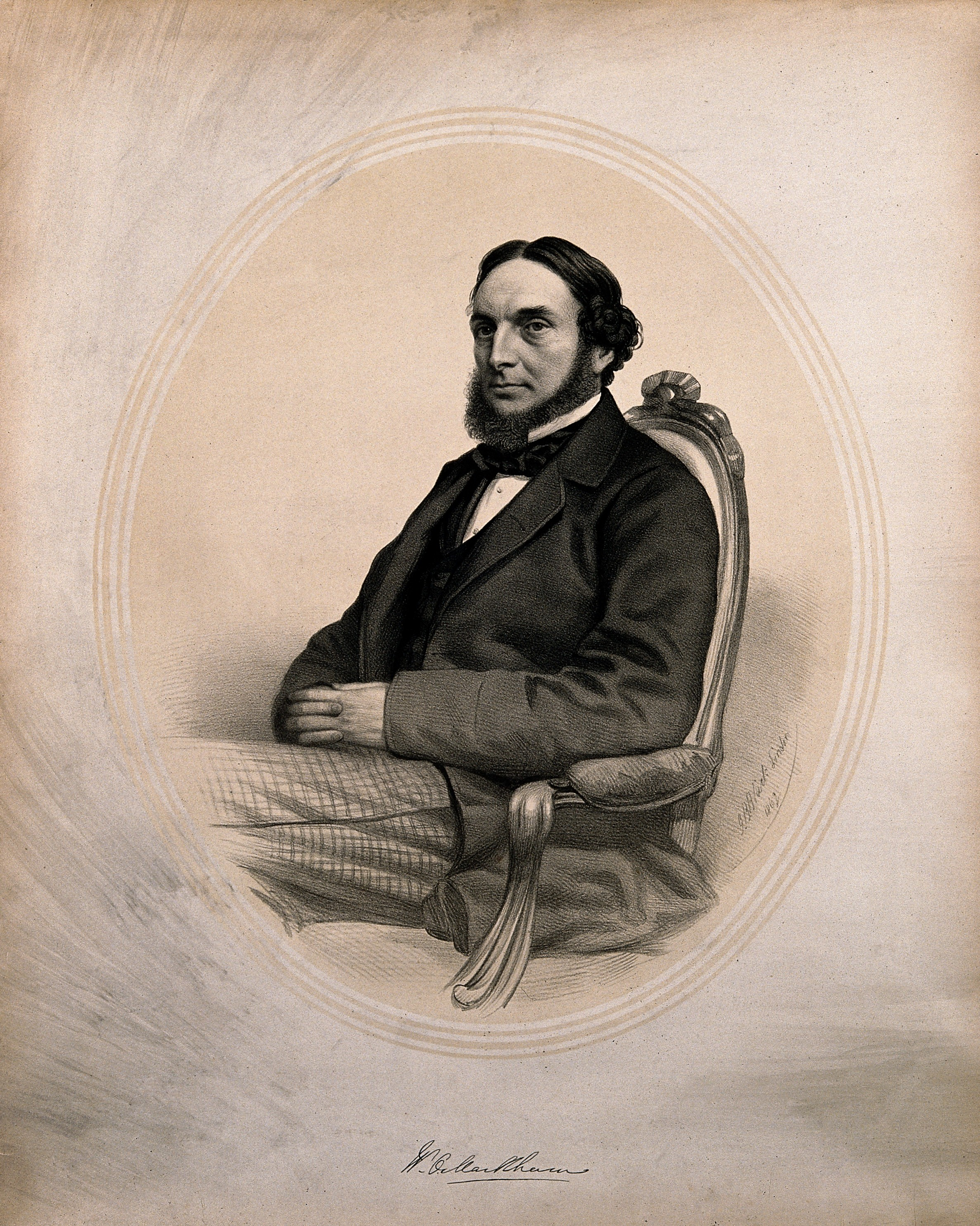
- William Orlando Markham; Lithograph by G. B. Black, 1862. Courtesy of Wellcome Trust.
- Born: 28 January 1818; Northampton, England
- Died: 23 January 1891 (aged 72); Clapham Common, England
- Resting place: Brookwood Cemetery, Brookwood, Surrey

William Orlando Markham FRCP (1818–1891) was an English physician and pioneer of cardiology.

After education at Edinburgh, Paris, and Heidelberg, William Markham graduated in 1840 M.D. in the University of Edinburgh, where he obtained a gold medal for his thesis on the surgical practice of Paris, illustrated by cases. He became house-surgeon to the York Road Lying-in Hospital and soon after was appointed physician to the Blenheim Street Dispensary. He resigned that position when he was elected to the Western General Dispensary, New Road. At St Mary's Hospital, Markham was appointed in 1851 assistant physician and in 1857 full physician, resigning in December 1867. At St Mary's Hospital, he was from 1854 to 1860 lecturer on pathology and 1857 to 1860 lecturer on physiology. He was elected FRCP in 1854.

Markham was from January 1861 to August 1866 the editor-in-chief of the British Medical Journal. From 1867 to 1870 he was Poor Law inspector and medical adviser to the Poor Law Board; however, he resigned in November 1870 because of failing health.

His chief interest was in cardiology and his Diseases of the Heart (1856), perhaps the first work to distinguish the characteristic physical signs of mitral stenosis, was accepted as authoritative and went into a second edition. He was Goulstonian Lecturer in 1864 at the Royal College of Physicians. Markham was a man of considerable private means and, when his health began to fail in 1870, was able to retire in comfort.

== Family ==
William Orlando Markham was christened on 23 September 1818 in Northampton. His father was Charles Markham, Clerk of the Peace for Northampton. William Markham was married twice. He married his first wife, Eliza Emma, daughter of John William Smith of Shrewsbury, on 29 April 1847. She gave birth to their son, Henry William Kennedy Markham, on 26 July 1848 and died on 19 August 1848. William Markham's second wife was Catherine, daughter of Dr. James Hamilton of Edinburgh and widow of Thomas Segrave. William and Catherine married in September 1854. Their daughter, Eliza Catherine Markham, was born on 4 September 1855.

== Selected publications ==
- A Treatise on Auscultation and Percussion by Dr. Joseph Skoda, translated from the 4th ed. by W. O. Markham. 1853. (The German 1st edition was Joseph Škoda's Abhandlung über Perkussion und Auskultation, Vienna, 1839.)
- Diseases of the Heart by W. O. Markham, M.D. (2nd ed.). 1860.
