= William Rant =

English physician

William Rant (ca. 1604, Norwich – 15 September 1653, Norfolk) was an English physician, noteworthy as the Gulstonian Lecturer in 1639.

== Family ==
William Rant, junior, was the son of William Rant, senior (ca. 1564–1627), a Cambridge graduate and physician with a medical practice in Norwich. William Rant, senior, was closely related to several men who matriculated at the University of Cambridge: he was the brother of Robert Rant (matriculated in 1582) and Thomas Rant (matriculated in 1592; he was the father of William Rant, junior (matriculated in 1619), Humphrey Rant (matriculated in 1612), Thomas Rant (matriculated in 1619), John Rant (matriculated in 1626), and Edward Rant (matriculated in 1830).The Thomas Rant who matriculated in 1619 at the University of Cambridge was knighted in 1660. William Rant, junior, married Jane Dingley, whose father was Sir John Dingley of Wolverton. During the reign of Elizabeth I, John Dingley owned Wolverton Manor.

William (junior) and Jane Rant's daughter married Sir Edward Ward, 2nd Baronet, of Bixley. William (junior) and Jane Rant's son William was knighted in 1671. There were two Englishmen named "William Rant" who lived contemporaneously and were nephews of Sir Thomas Rant. Sir William Rant's daughter Jane was the first wife of Harbord Harbord.

== Education and career ==
At the age of 16, William Rant Jr. enrolled at Gonville and Caius College, Cambridge on 1 May 1619. He earned his M.B. in 1625 and M.D. degree in 1630. In 1634 he was elected as a Fellow of the Royal College of Physicians. He was the Gulstonian Lecturer in October 1639 with a lecture entitled De morbis partium quibus optime doctissimeque se gessit.

For many years, Rant Jr. practised medicine in London and eventually retired to Norfolk, allegedly because of his immoral conduct.

William Rant, junior, is buried at Thorpe St Andrew. He bequeathed six Arabic books to Gonville and Caius College, Cambridge.

Both William Rant, senior, and William Rant, junior, were considered outstanding physicians.
