= Christopher Robert Pemberton =

English physician (1765–1822)

Christopher Robert Pemberton FRCP FRS (1765, Trumpington, Cambridgeshire – 31 July 1822, Fredville, Kent) was an English medical doctor. He was the Gulstonian Lecturer in 1797 and the Harveian Orator in 1806.

== Education and career ==
After education at Bury St Edmunds School, he matriculated in 1784 at Caius College, Cambridge. There he graduated with an M.B. in 1789, was made a Fellow in 1793, and graduated with an M.D. in 1794. On the 25th of June 1796 he was elected a Fellow of the Royal College of Physicians. In 1797 he was elected a Fellow of the Royal Society.

On the 25th of April 1800, Pemberton was appointed physician to St George's Hospital. He resigned that office in 1808 (due to his severe neuralgia). In 1806 he was appointed physician-extraordinary to the Prince of Wales and to the Duke of Cumberland and Teviotdale and, afterward, to His Majesty King George III. Pemberton was "remarkable for the urbanity of his manners".

In 1806 he published A Practical Treatise on Various Diseases of the Abdominal Viscera. Several later editions were published. Carl Adolph Moritz Bresler translated the 4th edition into German. Pemberton's book is dedicated to Matthew Baillie, M.D., Charles Dalston Nevinson, M.D., Pelham Warren, M.D., Astley Cooper, Esq., and Benjamin Collins Brodie, Esq. The books's eleven chapters deal with peritonæum, liver, gall bladder, pancreas, spleen, kidneys, stomach, intestines, enteritis, "inflammation of the mucous membrane of the intestines", and "disease of the mesenteric glands". The book was studied by Charles Darwin

Within the 1806 book, Pemberton's 3 most original observations are: (i) water brash (GERD) can result from a diet that consists solely of potatoes (vitamin D deficiency), (ii) in some cases, cancer of the bowel can exist for a long time without significant symptoms, and (iii) over-exertion of particular muscles can lead to a form of palsy. Pemberton was one of the first English medical writers on trade palsies (such as carpal tunnel syndrome from too much sewing). He recommended the use of a splint supporting the hand in cases where there is palsy of the muscles of the back of the forehand. His book shows that he had considerable knowledge of morbid anatomy and was an "excellent clinical observer". However, the book suffers from the general state of ignorance and bad medical practice that prevailed in the early 1800s. For example, the first chapter recommends therapeutic bloodletting for pain associated with peritonitis.

Pemberton suffered from severe tic douloureux (trigeminal neuralgia). Sir Astley Cooper performed on him an operation that divided several branches of the trigeminal nerve — but failed to give Pemberton any relief. He was compelled by his continuing neuralgia to cease the practice of medicine, to leave London, and to retire to Kent at Fredville (which was the seat of his brother-in-law John Plumptre).

== Family ==
His grandfather was Sir Francis Pemberton. Christopher Robert Pemberton was the fifth son of Rev. Jeremiah Pemberton (?1711–1800). Eleanor Hamilton married Christopher Robert Pemberton in August 1794 — she was his second wife. Their daughter was Mary Hamilton Pemberton, who married Reverend Sir John Lees Lighton, 4th Baronet in 1817. Their eldest son was John Hamilton Lighton and their second son was Christopher Robert Lighton.
