= Thomas Rant =

Member of the Parliament of England

Sir Thomas Rant (1604 – 2 June 1671) was an English lawyer and politician who sat in the House of Commons in 1660.

Rant was the son of William Rant MD of Norwich. He was educated at Norwich under Mr Stonham and admitted to Caius College, Cambridge on 1 May 1619 aged 15. He was admitted at Gray's Inn on 22 February 1619 and practised Common Law in London. He married Mary Burwell, a daughter of Edmund Burwell of Woodbridge, Suffolk.

In 1660, Rant was elected Member of Parliament for Norwich in the Convention Parliament. He was knighted on 24 July 1660. He was of Thorpe Market, Norfolk, and was lord of the manor of Wendling, Norfolk in 1663.

Rant died at the age of 67 and was buried at Thorpe.

== Gallery ==
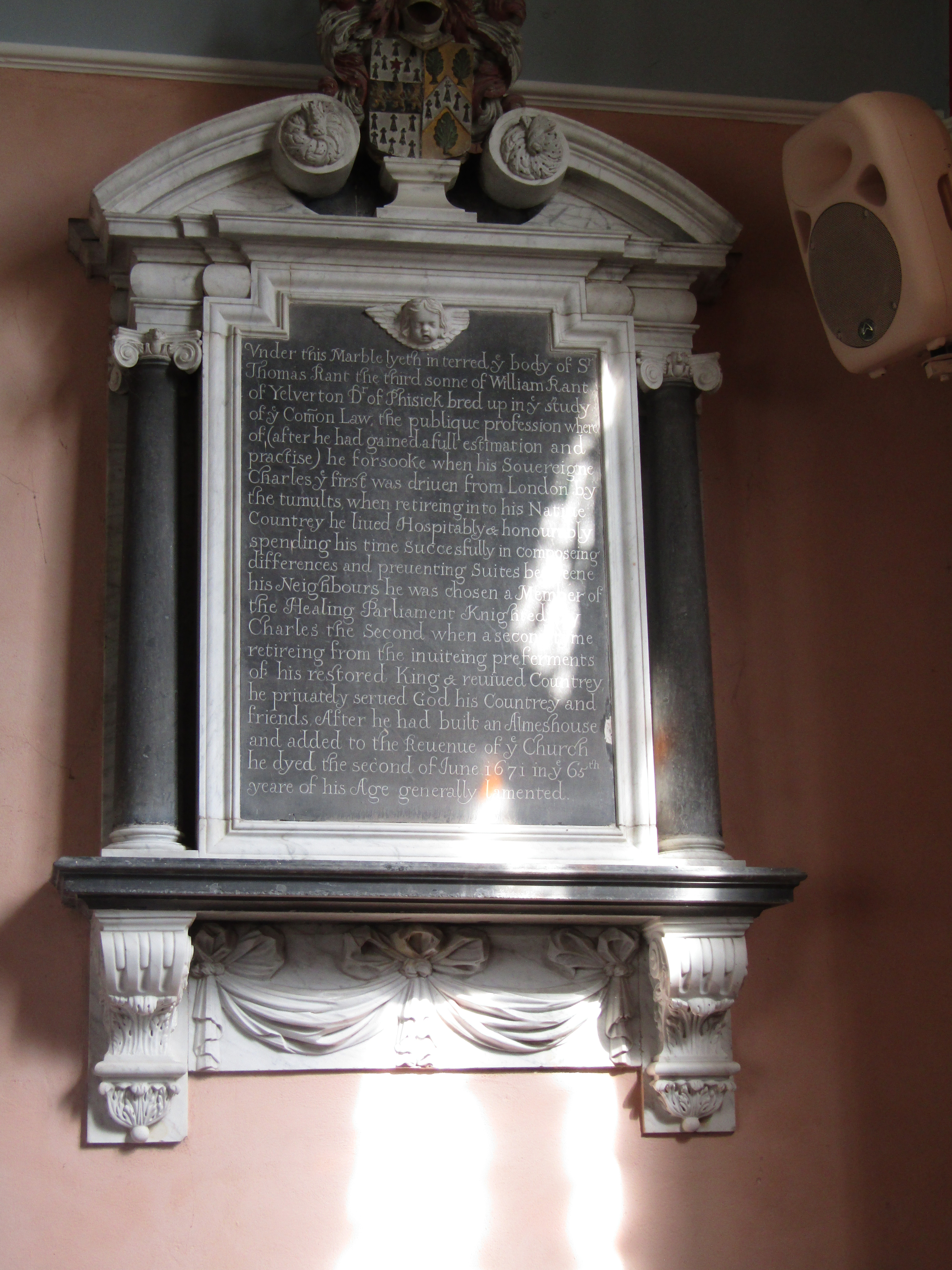
Memorial to Thomas Rant, Thorpe Market
