= Francis Riollay =

French physician (1748–1797)

- Born: 1748
- Died: 1797 (aged 48–49)
- Occupation: Physician

Francis Riollay (1748–1797) was a French physician.

== Biography ==
Riollay was the son of Christopher Riollay of Guingamp, France. He was born in Brittany. He was educated at Trinity College, Dublin, and there graduated with a B.A., devoting himself mainly to classical studies. He published at Oxford in 1776 a student's edition of the text with Reitzius's Latin version of Lucian's πῶς δεῖ ἱστορίαν συγγράφειν, dedicated to his friend, Thomas Winstanley. He was incorporated at Oxford on 13 January 1777, proceeded M.A. on 29 April 1780, and began to practice medicine at Newbury. He published in 1778 in London ‘A Letter to Dr. Hardy on the Hints he has given concerning the Origin of Gout,’ in which he makes the ingenious suggestion that gout is a disease of the nervous system, but fails to support it by any anatomical evidence. Dr. Hardy published a reply in 1780. Riollay graduated M.B. at Oxford in March 1782, and M.D. on 13 July 1784. He moved to London, where he lived in Hart Street, Bloomsbury, and in 1783 published ‘The Doctrines and Practice of Hippocrates in Surgery and Physic,’ an abstract of the Hippocratic writings, with a complete translation of the aphorisms. He became a candidate or member of the Royal College of Physicians on 9 August 1784, and was elected a fellow on 15 August 1785. In 1787 he delivered the Gulstonian lectures, three in number, on fever. They were published, with a Latin preface, in 1788, and contain a clear account of the classical, mediæval, and then existing doctrines as to fever, without any clinical illustrations or personal observations. He also gave the Harveian oration in 1787, and was Croonian lecturer in 1788, 1789, and 1790. He went to live at Margate in 1791, and there he died in 1791.
