= John Micklethwaite =

English physician

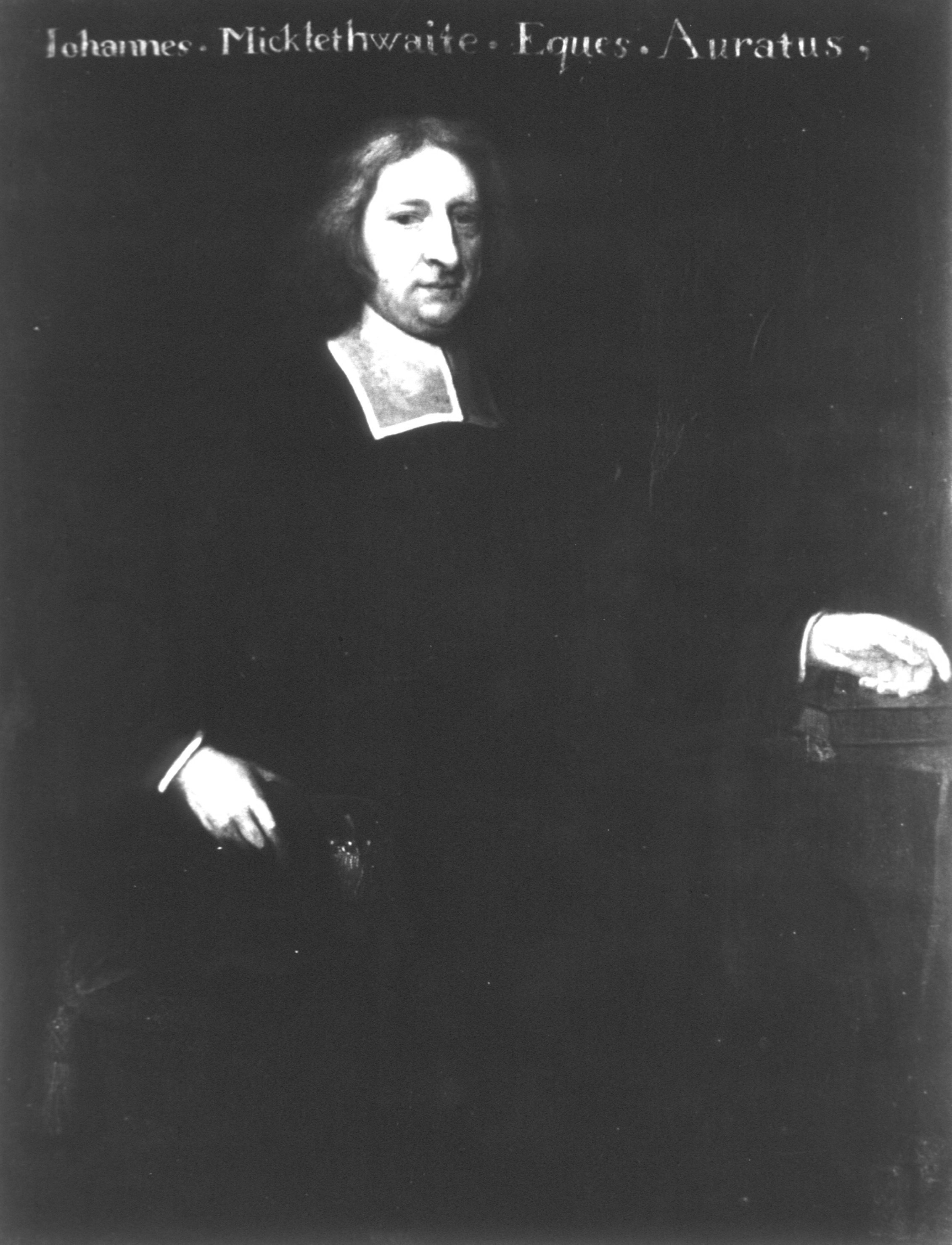
John Micklethwaite.

Sir John Micklethwaite M.D. (1612–1682) was an English physician, who attended Charles II. He was President of the Royal College of Physicians.

== Life ==
John Micklethwaite was the son of Thomas Micklethwaite, rector of Cherry Burton, Yorkshire, and was baptised, 23 August 1612, in the church of Bishop Burton, three miles from Beverley. He entered at the University of Leyden as a medical student in 1637, and took the degree of M.D. at the University of Padua in 1638. He proceeded M.D. by incorporation at Oxford 14 April 1648.

On 26 May 1643, Micklethwaite was appointed assistant physician at St. Bartholomew's Hospital to Dr John Clarke, whose eldest daughter he married, and he was elected physician 13 May 1653. The Long Parliament, 12 Feb. 1644, had recommended him for promotion, "in the place of Dr. Harvey, who hath withdrawn himself from his charge and is retired to the party in arms against the Parliament." He was elected a fellow of the College of Physicians 11 November 1643, and delivered the Gulstonian lectures in 1644. He was elected censor seven times, was treasurer from 1667 to 1675, and president from 1676 to 1681.

When Charles II in 1681 was taken ill at Windsor, Micklethwaite was sent for by Order in Council, and attained much repute by his treatment of the king, on whose recovery he was knighted. He was physician in ordinary to the king. He died of acute cystitis 29 July 1682, and was buried in the church of St. Botolph, Aldersgate, where his monument, with a long inscription, still remains. His death and achievements were celebrated in a broadside, An Elegy to commemorate and lament the Death of the most worthy Doctor of Physick, Sir John Micklethwaite. His portrait, representing him in a flowing wig, was given to the College of Physicians by Sir Edmund King, and hung in the dining-room.
