= Peter Mere Latham =

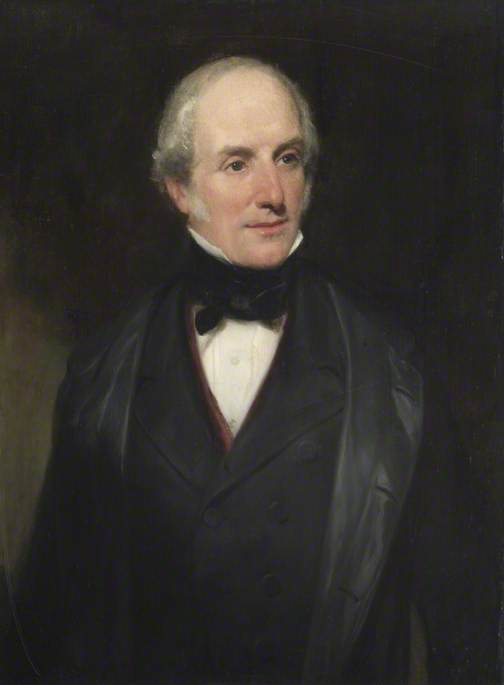
Peter Mere Latham, portrait c.1850

Peter Mere Latham (1789–1875) was an English physician and "a great medical educator".

== Life ==
The son of John Latham (1761–1843), he was born on 1 July 1789 in London. Described as "a very delicate child", he attended Sandbach School where he resided with his paternal grandmother (Sarah Latham née Podmore). Around 1796, he was transferred to Macclesfield Grammar School, and on to Brasenose College, Oxford in 1807. He took his M.D. degree at Oxford in 1818, and in the same year became a Fellow of the College of Physicians. He delivered their Gulstonian lectures in 1819 and the Harveian oration in 1839.

In 1815 Latham was elected physician to the Middlesex Hospital, and to St Bartholomew's in 1824. On her accession in 1837, he was appointed Physician Extraordinary to Queen Victoria. He retired to Torquay in 1865, where he died on 20 July 1875, age 86.

== Family ==
Latham was married twice. First to Diana Clarissa Chetwynd Stapleton, granddaughter of Lord Chetwynd; she died in 1825, within a year of their marriage. Secondly on 14 February 1833, to Grace Mary Chambers, third daughter of Commander David Chambers, R.N. By her he had four children, two sons, Weyland Mere, Philip Arderne, and two daughters, Diana Frances and Mary Grace.
