= Graham Selby Wilson =

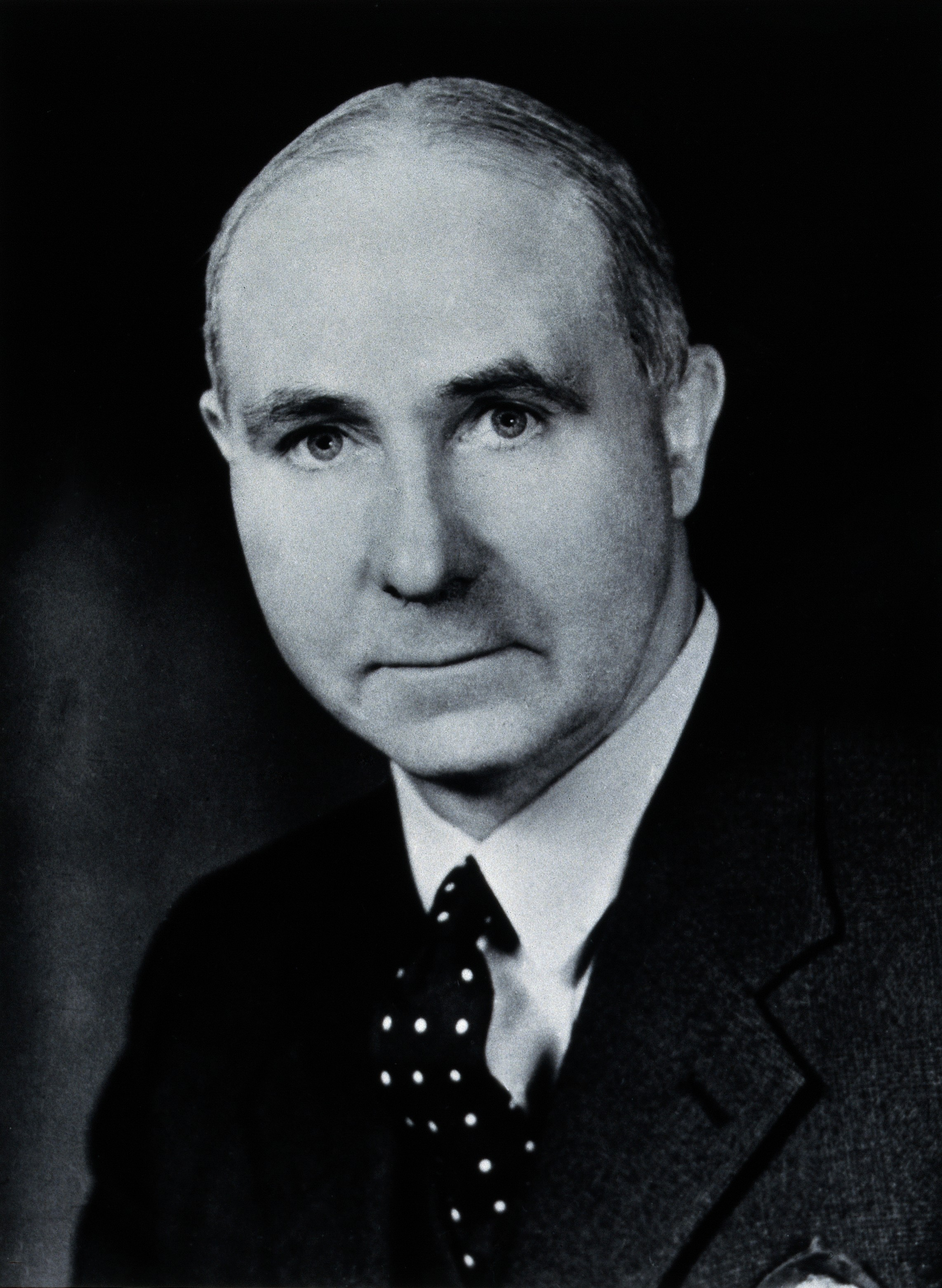
- Credit: Wellcome Library
- Born: 10 September 1895
- Died: 5 April 1987 (aged 91)
- Resting place: Highgate Cemetery

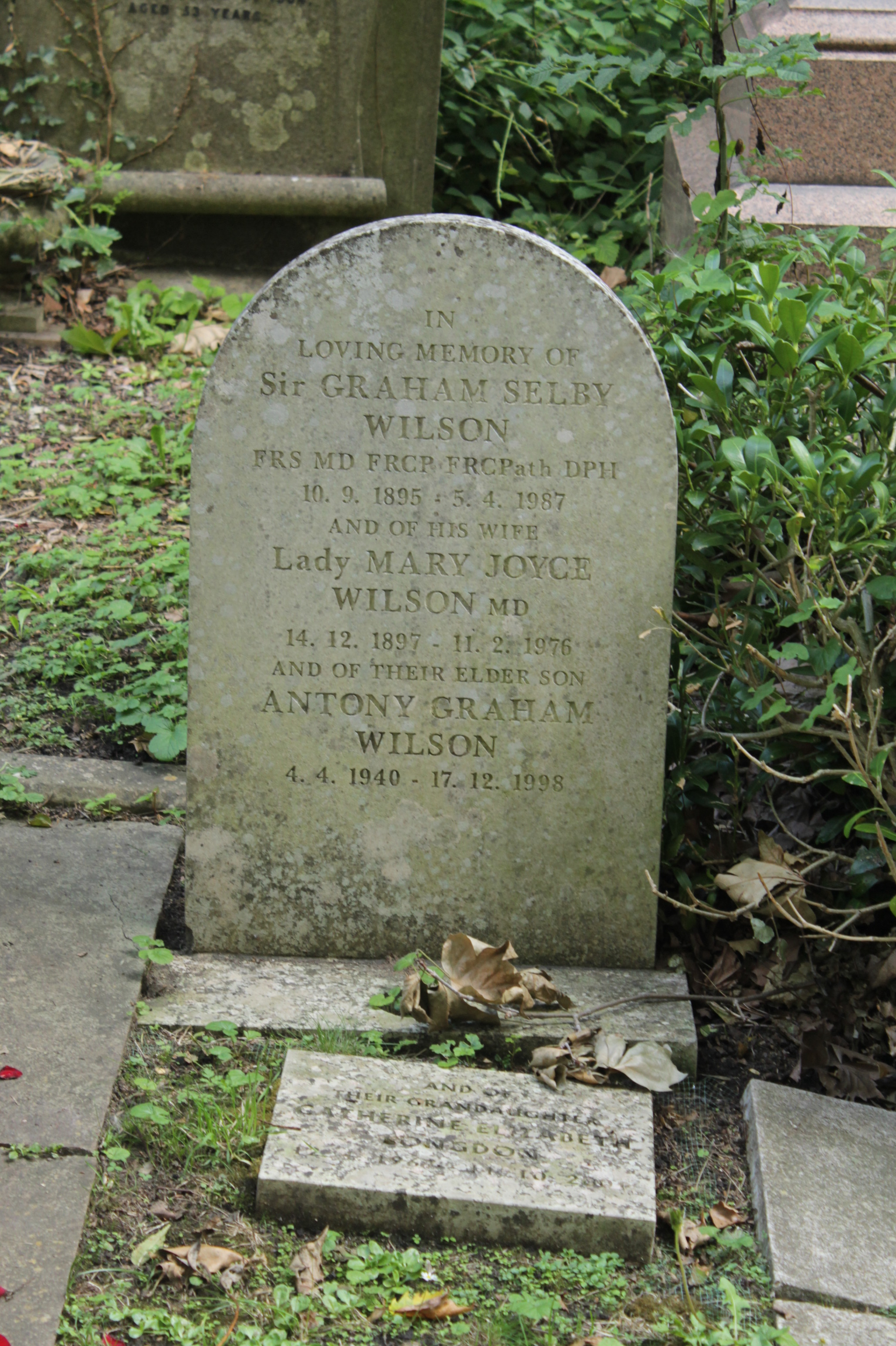
The grave of Graham Selby Wilson, Highgate Cemetery East.

Sir Graham Selby Wilson FRS FRCP DPH (10 September 1895 – 5 April 1987) was a noted bacteriologist.

== Biography ==
Graham Wilson was born on 10 September 1895 in Newcastle-upon-Tyne but his family moved south in his early years.

Wilson was educated at Epsom College, King's College London and Charing Cross Hospital Medical School. In the latter he came under the influence of William Whiteman Carlton Topley who was his inspiring colleague from 1919 until 1941. He received his doctorate (MD) in 1916 and served with the British Army in India, based at Kasauli. He returned to Charing Cross Hospital in 1919.

In 1923 Wilson moved with Topley to Manchester to serve as a lecturer in Bacteriology at the University of Manchester from 1923 to 1927 and Professor of Bacteriology as applied to Hygiene at the London School of Hygiene & Tropical Medicine from 1930 to 1947.

During the Second World War Wilson served as Director of the Emergency Public Health Laboratory Service following the death of its former Director W M Scott in an air raid.

Wilson was knighted in 1962, awarded the Buchanan Medal of the Royal Society in 1967, and elected a Fellow of the Royal Society in 1978.

In 1975, he was awarded the Jenner Medal of the Royal Society of Medicine.

In 1924 Wilson married Dr Mary Joyce Ayrton (1897–1976). They had one natural son, Antony Graham Wilson, and one adopted son. He is buried with his wife and son in East Highgate Cemetery.

== Selected publications ==
- Principles of Bacteriology and Immunity (1929) co-written with W W C Topley.
- The Hazards of Immunization (1967) Athlone Press
