= Alasdair Breckenridge =

Scottish pharmacologist (1937–2019)

Sir Alasdair Breckenridge CBE, FRCP, FRCPE, FRSE, FMedSci
- Born: Alasdair Muir Breckenridge; 7 May 1937; Angus, Scotland
- Died: 12 December 2019 (aged 82)
- Education: University of St Andrews
- Occupation: Clinical Pharmacologist
- Employer: University of Liverpool
- Awards: Paul Martini prize in Clinical Pharmacology; Goulstonian lecturership

Sir Alasdair Muir Breckenridge (7 May 1937 – 12 December 2019) was a Scottish pharmacologist.

A native of Angus, Scotland, Breckenridge studied medicine at the University of St Andrews, at a time when the medical school of that university was based in the much larger city of Dundee.

Leaving St Andrews and Dundee, he worked as a lecturer then senior lecturer at the Hammersmith Hospital and at the Royal Postgraduate Medical School (from 1964 to 1974) in London, after which he was professor of clinical pharmacology at the University of Liverpool (until 2002).

He served as chair of the Medicines and Healthcare products Regulatory Agency from its inception in 2003; as a member of the Committee on Safety of Medicines from 1982 to 2003 (being chairman from 1999 to 2003); and as a member of the Medical Research Council from 1992 to 1996. In 2005 he was appointed chair of the Emerging Science and Bioethics Advisory Committee.

He was appointed Commander of the Order of the British Empire (CBE) in the 1995 Birthday Honours for services to medicine and to health care and knighted in the 2004 New Year Honours for services to medicine. He was also elected a Fellow of the Royal College of Physicians (FRCP), a Fellow of the Royal College of Physicians of Edinburgh (FRCPE), a Fellow of the Royal Society of Edinburgh (FRSE), and a Fellow of the Academy of Medical Sciences (FMedSci).

He won the Paul Martini prize in Clinical Pharmacology in 1974 and the Goulstonian lecturership at the Royal College of Physicians in 1975. Upon his retirement from Liverpool and the National Health Service, a Festschrift was held there in his honour.
