= Howard Nicholson =

British pulmonologist

- Born: 1 February 1912; Houghton-le-Spring, Sunderland, County Durham
- Died: 11 February 2014 (aged 102)
- Occupation: Pulmonologist
- Known for: Hospital multidisciplinary care-planning

Howard Nicholson FRCP (1912–2014) was a British pulmonologist and pioneer in multidisciplinary care-planning and the treatment of tuberculosis with antibiotics.

== Biography ==
Howard Nicholson began to study medicine at University College Hospital (UCH) in 1929, graduating MBBS and qualifying MRCS, LRCP in 1935. At UCH, he held training posts, including registrar in radiology. He graduated with the higher MD degree from UCH in 1938.

In WWII, Nicholson joined the RAMC. He departed from England in 1941 to serve in Palestine and Egypt as part of a chest surgical team headed by Andrew Logan, who used a multidisciplinary approach to teamwork. Nicholson was promoted to lieutenant colonel before demobilization, when he was appointed registrar and then chief assistant at the Brompton Hospital.

At University College Hospital, London, where he was appointed consultant chest physician in 1948 and where, among other duties, he supervised an Artificial Pneumothorax clinic, Nicholson was one of the pioneers of what has come to be known as the “multidisciplinary” approach, involving regular meetings with surgeons, nurses and other health professionals to draw up “management plans” for each patient. The “multidisciplinary” approach to health care is now promoted as the gold standard for NHS hospital care.

Nicholson was elected FRCP in 1949 and was appointed Goulstonian Lecturer in 1950. In the 1950s he was one of the pioneers of antibacterial therapy for tuberculosis. With Clifford Hoyle and other colleagues, he published two of the first papers on long-term combination anti-bacterial therapy for tuberculosis to reduce the relapse rate following conventional short courses.

Nicholson was much sought after to write chapters on chest diseases in general textbooks; Dame Margaret Turner-Warwick, who worked as his registrar, has recalled that “he simply started at the left hand top corner and wrote fluently until he reached the bottom right”. No re-editing was required.

Even after he retired Howard kept up to date with the medical literature, continuing to read the British Medical Journal every week even when he was over 100. ... His broad interests were doubtless in large part due to his family background: his great-grandfather was Joseph Skipsey, ‘the Pitman Poet’. ... Howard had a great love and knowledge of literature, particularly Jane Austen and Henry James. Opera was another passion.

Nicholson married in 1941. His wife died in 2001. They had no children.

== Selected publications ==
- Logan, A.; Nicholson, H. (September 1949). "Non-specific suppurative pneumonia". Thorax. 4 (3): 125–133. doi:10.1136/thx.4.3.125. PMC 1018300. PMID 18142329.
- Nicholson, H. (7 February 1953). "Chest pain". Br Med J. 1 (4805): 324–326. doi:10.1136/bmj.1.4805.324. PMC 2015817. PMID 13009195.
- Nicholson, H. (14 February 1953). "Pleural effusion". Br Med J. 1 (4806): 389–391. doi:10.1136/bmj.1.4806.389. PMC 2015473. PMID 13009222.
- with Clifford Hoyle and J. Dawson: Hoyle, C.; NICHOLSON H; DAWSON J (1955). "Prolonged chemotherapy in pulmonary tuberculosis". Lancet. 266 (6904): 1310–1314. doi:10.1016/s0140-6736(55)93110-x. PMID 13272380.
