= Assuerus Regimorter =

English physician (1614–1650)

Assuerus Regimorter or Regemorter, M.D, (1614–1650) was an English physician, an early researcher into rickets.

== Life ==
The son of the Rev. Ambrose Regemorter, he was born in London in December 1614, and baptised at the Dutch church in Austin Friars, 6 January 1615. He was educated at the school of Thomas Farnaby, and afterwards studied medicine at the University of Leyden, where he graduated M.D. 11 Feb. 1636, maintaining a thesis on ague. On 29 March 1636 he was incorporated M.D. at Oxford.

He began practice in London, and became a licentiate of the College of Physicians, 30 September 1639, a candidate or member, 22 December 1642, and a fellow, 11 November 1643. He delivered the Gulstonian lectures in 1645, and was a censor in 1649. Regimorter lived in Lime Street, London, and had a large practice as a physician. He died 25 November 1660, and left £20 to the College of Physicians.

== Works ==
He was one of the three physicians who about 1644 began the investigation of rickets. At the end of the preface to Tractatus de Rachitide, published in 1650, his initials are the last, following those of Francis Glisson, and George Bate. He and Bate had numerous conferences with Glisson, who was the real author of the book, as is stated in the preface.
