= Humphrey Ridley =

English physician (1653–1708)

- Born: 1653; Mansfield, Nottinghamshire, England
- Died: 1708 (aged 54–55)
- Burial place: St Andrew Holborn
- Education: Merton College, Oxford; Leiden University
- Occupation: Physician
- Known for: His studies of neuroanatomy His Goulstonian Lecture
- Medical career
- Field: Neuroanatomy
- Notable works: The Anatomy of the Brain

Dr Humphrey Ridley (1653 – April 1708) was an English physician who followed the research done by Willis, Vieussens, and Galen, and who is most noted for his studies of neuroanatomy.

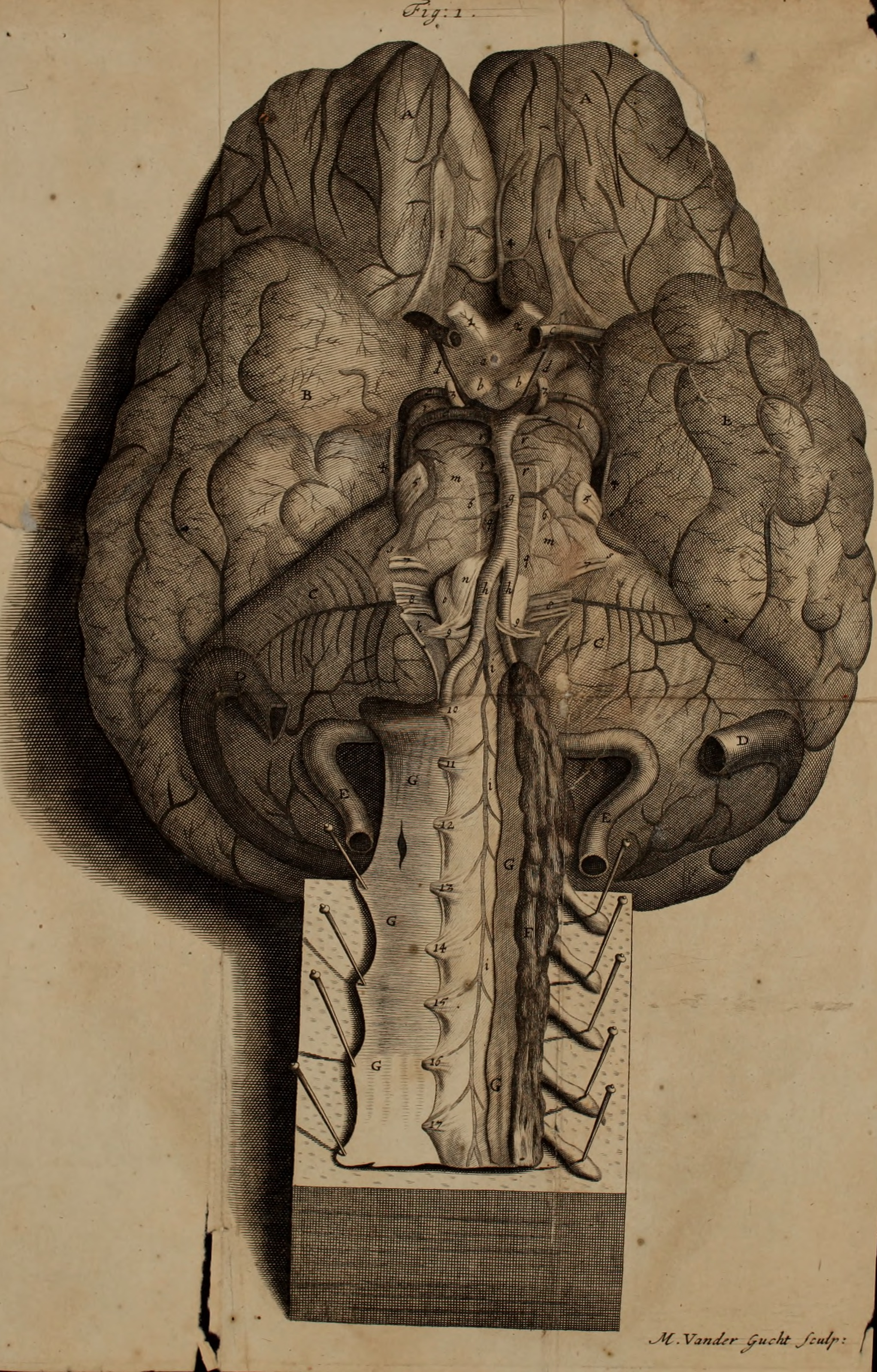
An illustration from The Anatomy of the Brain

== Life ==
Ridley was born the son of Thomas Ridley, in Mansfield, Nottinghamshire. In 1671, aged 18, he began his studies in medicine at Merton College, Oxford, but from there didn't get a degree. Instead, Ridley graduated as a doctor of medicine from Leiden University in 1679 with a thesis on sexually transmitted diseases with the title “De lue venerea," after which in 1688 he was incorporated as MD at Cambridge. After settling in London, he became a Candidate of the College of Physicians on 30 September 1691, and then admitted as a fellow on the same day the following year. In 1693/4, he gave the Gulstonian lectures.

Ridley died in April 1708, and was buried at St Andrew's, Holborn on 9 April.

== Works ==
- The Anatomy of the Brain, containing its Mechanism and Physiology; together with some new Discoveries and Corrections of Ancient and Modern Authors upon that subject ^{[a]}
- Observationes Medico-Practicæ et Physiologicæ de Asthmate et Hydrophobiâ ^{[b]}

== Notes ==
8 volumes, London, 1695. This was also the first book to be written about the brain in the English language.

8 volumes, London, 1703, containing cases of a variety of disorders and ten bodily dissections.
