= Edward Seymour (physician) =

English physician and medical writer

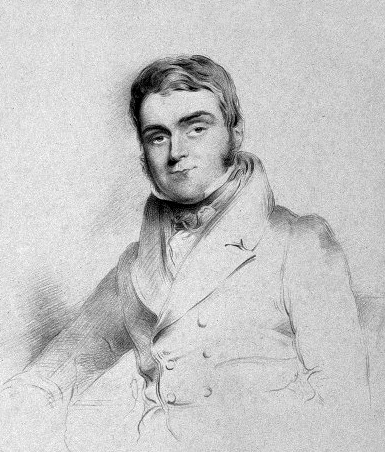
Edward Seymour, lithograph about 1830

Edward James Seymour (30 March 1796 – 16 April 1866) was an English physician and medical writer.

== Life ==
He was the third son of William Seymour of 65 Margaret Street, Cavendish Square, London, by his wife, Thyphena Letithœa, eldest daughter of Daniel Foulston of London. His father was an attorney-at-law, who became deputy-lieutenant for the county of Sussex. Edward Seymour, born on 30 March 1796, was baptised at the church of St. Nicholas, Lower Tooting. He received his education at Richmond School, Surrey, and at Jesus College, Cambridge, where he graduated B.A. in January 1816, M.A. in 1819, and M.D. in 1826. He had a license ad practicandum from his university in 1822. He also studied medicine in London, Edinburgh, and Paris; he was admitted an inceptor candidate of the Royal College of Physicians on 22 December 1823, a candidate on 30 September 1826, and a fellow on 1 October 1827. At the college he subsequently held the posts of Gulstonian lecturer in 1829, censor in 1830, Croonian lecturer in 1831, and consiliarius in 1836.

The law at that time did not permit physicians to practise in London under the age of 26, and the first years of Seymour's professional life were passed in Italy, mainly at Florence, where he had a good income. In 1823 he returned to England, and, establishing himself at 23 George Street, Hanover Square, soon acquired a practice. On 28 November 1828 he was elected physician to St George's Hospital; he held the post until 1847, and rose to be senior physician. Soon after settling in London he became physician to the Dreadnought Hospital ship at Greenwich, and then consulting physician to the Seamen's Hospital. He was also physician to the Duke of Sussex.

From 1 September 1831 to 1839 Seymour was a metropolitan commissioner in lunacy; he was one of the first to use opium in the treatment of mental illness. On 17 June 1841 he was elected a Fellow of the Royal Society; he was also a fellow of the Royal Medical and Chirurgical Society, and a member of the Royal Medical and Wernerian Society of Edinburgh, and of the Imperial and Royal Academy of Science of Siena.

Seymour died at his residence, 13 Charles Street, Berkeley Square, on 16 April 1866, from organic disease of the stomach and liver.

== Works ==
Seymour's main works were:

- Diseases of the Ovaria (with a volume of plates), 1830.
- Observations on the Medical Treatment of Insanity, 1832.
- ‘Nature and Treatment of Dropsy,’ 1837.
- ‘Thoughts on the Treatment of several severe Diseases of the Human Body,’ 1847.

In 1859 Seymour published an open letter, addressed to the Earl of Shaftesbury, On the Laws which regulate Private Lunatic Asylums, with a comparative View of the process "de lunatico inquirendo" in England and the law of France; it had some observations on the causes of insanity, and its treatment during the preceding 25 years. He also published: On Tumours in the Abdomen; On some of the Diseases of the Stomach; and a series of papers On the specific Effect of Atmospheric Poison in the Production of Fever.

== Cricket career ==
Seymour played for Cambridge University in one match in 1819, totalling 0 runs with a highest score of 0 and holding 1 catch.

== Family ==
On 4 September 1817 Seymour married Maria Searancke of Clapton, and by her had a family of six sons and four daughters. The eldest son, Lieutenant-colonel Charles Frederick Seymour, C.B., of the 84th regiment, was acting adjutant-general at the siege of Lucknow.

== Bibliography ==
- Haygarth, Arthur (1862). Scores & Biographies, Volume 1 (1744–1826). Lillywhite.

Attribution

This article incorporates text from a publication now in the public domain: Lee, Sidney, ed. (1897). "Seymour, Edward James". Dictionary of National Biography. Vol. 51. London: Smith, Elder & Co.
