= Grant David Yeats =

Grant David Yeats (1773–1836) was an English-American medical doctor and medical writer.

== Life ==
Born in Florida, he was the son of David Yeats, a physician who was the Secretary of the East Florida Colony in Florida. He matriculated from Hertford College, Oxford, on 21 January 1790, graduating B.A. on 15 October 1793, M.A. on 25 May 1796, M.B. on 4 May 1797. He was incorporated M.B. at Dublin in 1807, and graduated M.D. from Trinity College, Oxford, on 7 June 1814. He spent two winter sessions in Edinburgh and one in London, and then practised at Bedford, where he assisted in the establishment of the Bedford general infirmary, and at a later period of the lunatic asylum near the town. He was nominated physician to each of these institutions. While at Bedford he acquired the friendship of Samuel Whitbread and of John Russell, 6th Duke of Bedford.

On the Duke of Bedford's nomination to the lord-lieutenancy of Ireland, Yeats accompanied him to Dublin in March 1806 as his private physician. While at Dublin he was instrumental in establishing the Dublin Humane Society, and was made a member of Trinity College, Dublin. On the duke's return to England in 1807 he resumed his position at Bedford, where he later served as mayor. About 1814 he moved to London, where he was admitted a candidate of the Royal College of Physicians on 30 September 1814, and a fellow on 30 September 1815. He was Gulstonian lecturer in 1817, censor in 1818, and Croonian lecturer around 1826 (speaking against the stethoscope).

He was elected a Fellow of the Royal Society on 1 July 1819, and died at Tunbridge Wells on 14 November 1836. He married a daughter of Patrick Colquhoun.

== Works ==
Yeats's major work, Observations on the Claims of the Moderns to some Discoveries in Chemistry and Physiology (London), was published in 1798, after he had settled at Bedford. In it he called attention to the experiments of John Mayow, whose merits Thomas Beddoes had discovered two years before. It was uncritical but helped rescue his achievements from oblivion.

Yeats was the author of:

- 'An Address on the Nature and Efficacy of the Cowpox in preventing the Smallpox,' London, 1803
- 'A Statement of the Early Symptoms which lead to Water on the Brain, London, 1815; 2nd edit., London, 1833.
- 'A Biographical Sketch of the Life and Writings of Patrick Colquhoun,' London, 1815.

He also published many papers in 'Annals of Medicine,' the 'Medical and Physical Journal' and 'Medical Transactions.'
