= Roderick Macleod (physician) =

Scottish physician (??–1852)

- Occupation: Physician

Roderick Macleod (died 1852) was a Scottish physician.

== Biography ==
Macleod was a native of Scotland. He was educated at Edinburgh, where he graduated M.D. on 1 August 1816, his thesis being 'De Tetano.' After a brief career in the army, from which he retired on half-pay, he settled in London. By 1822 he was physician to the Westminster General Dispensary, to the Infirmary for Children, and to the Scottish Hospital in London. He was admitted a licentiate of the College of Physicians on 22 December 1821, and a fellow on 9 July 1836. In 1837 he read the Gulstonian lectures, and became consiliarius in 1839. On 13 Feb. 1833 he was elected physician to St. George's Hospital, and resigned that office in consequence of ill-health in 1845. Macleod, who was a member of the Medico-Chirurgical Society of London and of the Royal Medical Society of Edinburgh, died at Chanonry, Old Aberdeen, on 7 Dec. 1852.

Macleod became in July 1822 editor and proprietor of the London 'Medical and Physical Journal,' which had been previously issued under the title of the 'Medical and Physical Journal,' Though the times were stormy for advocates of medical reform, Macleod conducted the paper with tact and ability. He was assisted in the editorship by John Bacot, M.D. In 1842 he published, with large additions, his Gulstonian lectures 'On Rheumatism in its various forms, and on the Affections of Internal Organs, more especially the Heart and Brain, to which it gives rise,' 8vo, London.
