= Paggen William Mayo =

Paggen William Mayo (1766–1836) was an English physician.

== Life ==
He was elected to a medical fellowship at St John's College, Oxford, 6 July 1792, and graduated D.M. in 1795. Elected physician to the Middlesex Hospital 23 August 1793, he was admitted F.R.C.P. 30 September 1796, and was censor 1797, Gulstonian lecturer 1798, and Harveian orator 1807. Resigning his hospital appointment in 1801, he moved from Conduit Street, London, to Doncaster, and eventually to Bridlington, where he died 6 July 1836.

== Family ==
He married Charlotte, daughter of the Rev. Stephen Buckle, LL.D., and left children. He was elder brother to Charles Mayo.
