= Francis Clifton =

English physician

Francis Clifton, M.D. (d. 1736), was an English physician.

== Education ==
Clifton was the fourth and youngest son of Josiah Clifton, merchant, of Great Yarmouth, Norfolk, and his wife Mary, the only child of Thomas Fenne of the same town. Deciding to follow the medical profession, he entered Leyden on 23 May 1724, and before the end of the year graduated doctor of medicine there. His inaugural dissertation, De distinctis et con-fluentibus Variolis (Leyden, 1724) was included by Albrecht von Haller in the fifth volume of his Disputationes ad Morborum Historiam et Curationem Facientes.

== Career ==
Clifton afterwards settled in London, where his classical and scientific attainments won him the friendship of many eminent men, including Sir Hans Sloane, at whose instance he was elected a fellow of the Royal Society on 22 June 1727. The same year he published Hippocratis Coi Operum quse extant omnium secundum Leges artis Medicae dispositorum, editionis novse specimen, (London, 1727), which was followed in 1732 by Proposals for Printing, by subscription, all the works of Hippocrates in Greek and Latin, digested in a new and regular manner, but from want of encouragement the intended publication never appeared. Clifton received the honorary degree of M.D. from Cambridge on 26 April 1728, during the visit of George II; was admitted a candidate of the College of Physicians on 23 December in the same year, a fellow on 22 December 1729, and read the Gulstonian lectures in 1732.

In 1731 he published Tabular observations recommended as the plainest and surest way of practising and improving physick. The state of physick, ancient and modern, briefly considered in the following year: with a plan for the improvement of it. In these, Clifton advocated that physicians should base their ideas about the effectiveness of their remedies on a statistical analysis of their effects on their patients, rather than on theory.

== Death in Jamaica ==
Clifton also held the appointment of physician to Frederick, Prince of Wales, which he resigned, and abruptly quitted London for Jamaica in 1734. Writing to Sir Hans Sloane from Kingston in that island on 3 June 1736, he says : "My misfortunes came so fast upon me, and my brother's provocations were so frequently repeated, that I was hurried in a manner to death about 'em". He died a few weeks afterwards, leaving no issue by his wife, Sarah Banckes, daughter of a merchant in Leadenhall Street. In the letters of administration P.C.C. granted on 6 Nov. 1736 to his widow, Clifton is described as "late of the parish of St. George, Hanover Square, Middlesex, but at Kingston in Jamaica, deceased". His widow survived until 1747, and was buried in the parish church of St. Andrew Undershaft.

At the time of his death Clifton was engaged in drawing up an account of the diseases of Jamaica, but left it unfinished. He also published Hippocrates upon Air, Water, and Situation ... To this is added Thucydides' Account of the Plague of Athens. Translated and ... illustrated with notes (London 1734).
