= Arthur P. Luff =

Arthur Pearson Luff (1855–1938) was a British physician and forensic chemist. He is considered one of the founders of 20th century forensic medicine.

== Biography ==
Luff studied in London at the Royal College of Science, and did research and teachings in chemistry and pharmacology, with a scholarship from the Pharmaceutical Society. As a student, he worked with Charles Romley Alder Wright on analysing and synthesising heroin, publishing joint papers with him on this subject. He was elected a Fellow of the Chemical Society in 1877.

Luff was awarded the B.Sc. (Lond.) in 1883, and then studied at the medical school at St Mary's Hospital, qualifying as a doctor in 1886. He continued to study a range of subjects, achieving honours in many of his exams, including forensic medicine and organic chemistry. His academic excellence was recognised when he was appointed Lecturer in Forensic Medicine and Toxicology at St Mary's Hospital in 1887, holding this post until 1908. The other major part of his teaching career was as lecturer on Hygiene and Public Health, a post he held for twelve years from 1890. In addition to his lectures, he published several textbooks, including one on chemistry and one on forensic medicine. He had a reputation as a brilliant lecturer, and his textbooks were popular and went through several editions. One of Luff's students, studying with him from 1899, was Bernard Spilsbury, who later became a celebrated pathologist and expert witness.

Outside his teaching career, Luff also practiced as a doctor at St Mary's Hospital. In 1894, he became a member of the Clinical Society of London. In 1896, he became a Fellow of the Royal College of Physicians. Luff specialised in the treatment of gout, and the following year (1897) he gave the Goulstonian Lecture, with a talk titled On the Chemistry and Pathology of Gout. He then published a textbook based on his lecture, Gout, its Pathology and Treatment (1898). Luff retired from his medical practice in 1913, and in the same year gave the Harveian Lecture to the Harveian Society at the Medical Society of London, lecturing on The Various Forms of Fibrositis and their Treatment.

As well as teaching and practicing medicine, Luff also carried out forensics work involving analytical chemistry and toxicology, giving evidence in civil and criminal trials. From 1892 to 1908 he held the post of Scientific Analyst for the Home Office. He worked with the prominent analyst Thomas Stevenson, and gave evidence in many cases, including that of Harvey Crippen. Luff also worked on food safety, and another well-known case was the arsenic poisoning that affected beer supplies in Manchester in 1900.

During the First World War, which broke out the year after he retired, Luff, by then nearly 60, served as a medical officer (Lieutenant Colonel) at the 3rd London General Hospital, and was appointed a CBE for his services. After the war, during his retirement, Luff retained his interests in medicine and medical education, serving as an examiner for several educational institutions, and sitting on several committees for organisations such as the British Medical Association.

Luff, who died on 1 May 1938 at the age of 82, had married in 1893, and had two children, a son and a daughter who was also a doctor.

== Selected works ==
- An Introduction to the Study of Chemistry (1885)
- Text-book on Forensic Medicine and Toxicology (1895)
- Gout, its Pathology and Treatment (1899)
- A Manual of Chemistry for Medical Students (7th edition, 1925)

== Sources ==
- Arthur Pearson Luff (1855-1938), by William Henry Willcox, Obituary Notices, Journal of the Chemical Society (Resumed), 1938, pp 1128–1130
