= Sir Edward Ward, 1st Baronet, of Bixley =

Sir Edward Ward, 1st Baronet of Bixley (c. 1618 – 1684) was twice Sheriff of Norfolk in 1655–56 and 1656–57.

== Biography ==
Edward Ward was born about 1618, the son and heir of Thomas Ward of Bixley, Norfolk (bur. there 17 September 1632), by Anne, daughter of William Pert of Essex. He was admitted to Gray's Inn on 1 November 1635.

He was Sheriff of Norfolk for two successive years in 1656 and 1657. He was knighted, whilst sheriff, by the Lord Protector Oliver Cromwell at Whitehall on 2 November 1657 (this honour passed into oblivion at the Restoration). King Charles II created him a baronet of Bixley, Norfolk, on 19 December 1660.

He died and was buried at Bixley on 2 September 1684.

== Family ==
Edward Ward married firstly Mary, daughter of Richard Catelyn of Kirby Cane. She died before her father and was, apparently, buried at Postwick, Norfolk. He married secondly Elizabeth, daughter and heiress of John Harborne, of Mundham, Norfolk, who was son of William Harborne, ambassador (1582) to Turkey. They had children:

- Edward, who became the 2nd baronet and married Jane, daughter of William Rant, M.D. of London, and died about 1684, when he was succeeded by his eldest son Thomas.

== Notes ==
Baronetage of England
New creation	Baronet (of Bixley); 1660–1684	Succeeded by Edward Ward
