= Edward Emily =

Edward Emily (1617–1657) was an English physician and the first Harveian orator.

== Life ==
He was the third son of Maximilian Emily of Helmdon, Northamptonshire, and Elizabeth, daughter and coheiress of John Waleston of Ruislip, Middlesex, and was baptised on 20 April 1617. He was entered on the books at the university of Leyden on 8 October 1640, and he graduated M.D. on 10 November. On 25 June 1641 he was admitted licentiate of the College of Physicians; he became a candidate on 22 December 1643 and a fellow on 8 May 1647, having been in the meantime incorporated M.D. at Oxford, being described as of Christ Church, Oxford.

He was elected Gulstonian lecturer in 1649, discussing during his course atoms as well as anatomy, and was censor of the College in 1652 and 1653. He was the first Harveian orator in 1656, and gave offence to his colleagues by speaking in his oration with unseemly virulence against the army and the existing Commonwealth. A vote of censure was passed, four days later; but, on his affirming that he had intended no harm, and the technical portion of his speech being found of high merit, the censure was removed. It was determined, however, that in future all Harveian orations should be handed to the president and censors of the college to be read and approved at least a month before their delivery.

Emily was senior physician at St. Thomas's Hospital, and practised in the neighbourhood of Silver Street. His associates included Thomas Wharton. He died on 14 November 1657, aged forty, and was buried in the church of St. Olave's, Silver Street, the funeral being attended by a large concourse of members of the College of Physicians. Baldwin Hamey speaks of him in terms of high praise. He married Elizabeth, daughter of John Millington of Wandsworth, and by her he had an only son, John, who became a merchant in the city.
