= Henry Park =

English surgeon

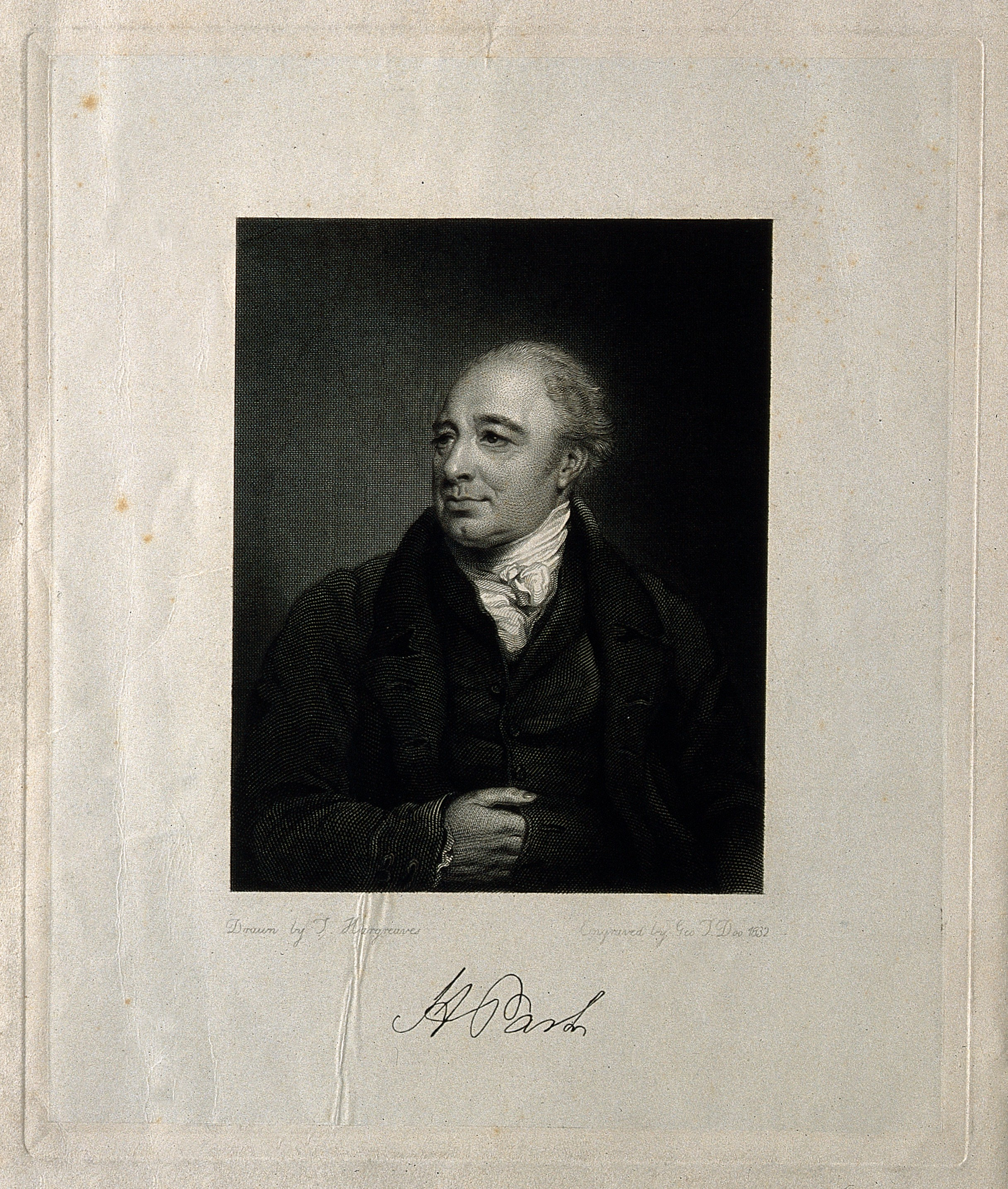
- Born: 2 March 1744–5
- Died: 28 January 1831
- Occupation: Surgeon

Henry Park (2 March 1744–5 – 28 January 1831) was an English surgeon.

== Biography ==
Park was the son of a Liverpool surgeon, was born in that town on 2 March 1744–5, and received his early education under the Rev. Henry Wolstenholme. At fourteen he was placed with a surgeon at the Liverpool Infirmary, and when only seventeen had the care of a large number of French prisoners of war. He then went to London to enter upon an apprenticeship to Percival Pott, and subsequently completed his studies at Paris and Rouen. In 1766, when he was about twenty-one, he settled in his native town, and in the following year was appointed surgeon to the infirmary, a post which he held for thirty-one years. He retired from work at the age of seventy-one, after a professional career of extreme activity, and with the deserved reputation of a bold, original, and successful practitioner. He is best remembered by his ‘Account of a New Method of Treating Diseases of the Joints of the Knee and Elbow,’ 1783, 8vo, which was translated into French in 1784 (Paris), and into Italian in 1792 (by Brera, Pavia). It was afterwards published with Moreau's ‘Cases of Excision of Carious Joints, with observations by J. Jeffrey,’ Glasgow, 1806. The operation which led to the writing of this book is described by the ‘Edinburgh Review’ (October 1872) as one of the greatest surgical triumphs of the time. Park died, near Liverpool, on 28 January 1831.

He married, in 1776, the eldest daughter of Mr. Ranicar of West Leigh Hall, Leigh, Lancashire, by whom he had eight daughters and a son, John Ranicar Park.
