= John Ranicar Park =

English surgeon and theologian

- Born: 1778; Liverpool, England
- Died: 14 December 1847 (aged 68–69); Cheltenham, England
- Occupations: Surgeon and theologian

John Ranicar Park (1778 – 14 December 1847) was an English surgeon and theologian.

== Biography ==
Park was the only son of Henry Park. He was born at Liverpool in 1778, and educated, first at Warrington, then under a private tutor, and subsequently on the continent. He entered at Jesus College, Cambridge, graduated M.B. in 1813, and M.D. in 1818. He was licensed to practise by his university on 18 November 1815, and a month later was admitted an inceptor candidate of the Royal College of Surgeons. On 30 September 1819 he was made a fellow of that college, and in 1821 appointed Gulstonian lecturer. He was also a fellow of the Linnean Society. He died at Cheltenham on 14 December 1847.

His professional works consist of:

- ‘Inquiry into the Laws of Animal Life,’ 1812. * ‘Outlines of the Organs of the Human Body.’
- ‘The Pathology of Fever [Gulstonian Lectures],’ 1822.

His subsequent writings were theological:

- ‘Views of Prophecy and the Millennium.’
- ‘Concise Exposition of the Apocalypse,’ 1823.
- ‘The Apocalypse Explained,’ 1832.
- ‘An Amicable Controversy with a Jewish Rabbi on the Messiah's Coming,’ 1832.
- ‘An Answer to Anti-Supernaturalism,’ 1844.
