= Robert Taylor (physician) =

English physician

- Born: April 1710; Newark
- Died: 15 May 1762 (aged 52)
- Occupation: Physician

Robert Taylor FRS (April 1710 – 15 May 1762) was an English physician.

== Biography ==
Taylor was the son of John Taylor of Newark, twice mayor of that town. He was born there in April 1710. He was educated at the Newark grammar school on Dr. Magnus's foundation and under Dr. Warburton; he was entered at St. John's College, Cambridge, but migrated to Trinity College on 27 Oct. 1727. He proceeded M.B. in 1732 and M.D. on 7 July 1737. Returning to Newark in 1732, he won the esteem of his fellow-townsmen by his polished manners, professional assiduity, and general erudition. While practising at Newark he was called in to attend Richard Boyle, third earl of Burlington, who was on a visit to Belvoir Castle, and who was there taken dangerously ill. Taylor cured the patient by (it is said) the bold administration of opium. Thereupon Lord and Lady Burlington prevailed upon him to remove to London, where their efforts soon established him in extensive practice, and obtained for him the patronage of Sir Edward Hulse (1682–1759), who was withdrawing from public life. Taylor was admitted a candidate of the Royal College of Physicians on 4 April 1748, and was elected a fellow on 20 March 1749. He was Gulstonian lecturer in 1750, censor in 1751, and Harveian orator in 1755. His oration, which was published in 1756, summarised the opinion of the College of Physicians with respect to inoculation, and was especially valued in foreign countries. It ranks among the most polished in style and the most elaborate in matter of any of the Harveian orations that are in print.

Taylor was admitted a fellow of the Royal Society on 7 Dec. 1752. He held the appointment of physician to the king. A fine mansion at Winthorpe, near Newark, which he was erecting, was unfinished at the time of his death. He died on 15 May 1762, and was buried in South Audley Street chapel, whence his remains were removed in 1778 to Winthorpe. He was twice married: first to Anne, youngest daughter of John Heron (she died in 1757, and was buried at Newark); secondly, on 9 November 1759, to Elizabeth Mainwaring of Lincoln, a lady who had a fortune of 10,000l. His only surviving child, Elizabeth, became the wife of Henry Chaplin of Blankney Hall, Lincolnshire. He and his second wife are commemorated by a monument in Winthorpe church. There was a portrait of Taylor at Blankney in the possession of his descendant, the Right Hon. Henry Chaplin, M.P.

Taylor was the author of:

‘Epistola Critica ad O.V.D. Edoardum Wilmot, Baronettum; in qua quatuor Quæstionibus ad Variolas Insitivas spectantibus orbi medico denuo propositis ab Antonio de Haen in Univ. Vindobonensi Professore primario, directe responsum est.’ ‘Sex Historiæ Medicæ sive Morborum aliquot funestorum et rariorum Commentarius.’ These, with his Harveian oration of 1755, were published together under the title of ‘Miscellanea Medica,’ 4to, London, 1761.
