= William Addison (physician) =

British physician

William Addison FRS
- Born: 1803
- Died: 26 September 1881 (aged 77–78); Brighton, East Sussex, England
- Medical career
- Field: Physician
- Sub-specialties: Haematology

William Addison FRS (1803 – 26 September 1881) was a British physician.

He was elected Fellow of the Royal Society on 29 January 1846. He studied hematology.

He delivered the Goulstonian Lecture at the Royal College of Physicians in 1859 on the subject of Fevers and Infammation.

He died in Brighton.

== Works ==
- "On the Effects of Produced in Human Blood-corpuscules by Sherry Wine", Proceedings of the Royal Society of London, Volume 10, Printed by Taylor and Francis, 1860
- "The Law of Morphology of Metamorphosis of the Textures of the Human Body", The Lancet, Volume 1, UM-MEDSEARCH Gateway, J. Onwhyn, 1847; National Center for Biotechnology Information
- "On Inflammation", British Medical Journal, Volume 2, British Medical Association, 1873
- Cell Therapeutics, London: Churchill 1856
