= Richard Budd =

English physician (1746–1821)

- Born: 1746; Newbury, Berkshire, England
- Died: 2 September 1821 (aged 74–75); Battersea Rise
- Burial place: Speen, Berkshire
- Education: Balliol College, Oxford; Jesus College, Cambridge
- Occupation: Physician
- Known for: His Goulstonian Lecture
- Medical career
- Institutions: St Bartholomew's Hospital

Richard Budd (1746 - 2 September 1821) was a British medical doctor.

== Life ==
Richard Budd was born in Newbury, Berkshire to Richard Budd, a banker. In 1764, he went to Balliol College, Oxford, and afterwards went to Jesus College, Cambridge, where he graduated MB in 1770 and MD five years later in 1775. He became a fellow of the College of Physicians on 30 September 1777. Despite beginning practice in Newbury, he moved to London in 1780 and was then censor in 1780, 1783, 1786, 1789, 1791, and 1798, giving the Goulstonian Lecture in 1781. He was treasurer from 18 March 1799 to 4 April 1814. He was elected physician at St Bartholomew's Hospital from 23 June 1780 to 1801, and was also a physician at Christ's Hospital.

He died in Battersea Rise on 2 September 1821 and was buried in Speen, Berkshire.
