= Samuel Musgrave =

Samuel Musgrave, FRS (29 September 1732 – 5 July 1780) was an English classical scholar and physician.

He was born at Washfield, Devon, the son of Richard Musgrave. He matriculated at Queen's College, Oxford in 1749; and graduated B.A. from Corpus Christi College in 1754. He was elected to a Radcliffe travelling fellowship, at University College.

Musgrave spent about a decade abroad. At the period when the Treaty of Paris (1763) was signed, Musgrave was resident in Paris. He formed a theory that British representatives had sold out to the French, allowing a treaty unfavourable to British interests. He brought his theory to the attention of Lord Halifax, and the Speaker of the House of Commons, when he returned to England in 1765. In 1766 he settled at Exeter, but moved to Plymouth to improve his career prospects.

In an attempt to gain traction for his theory on the treaty, Musgrave published in 1769 a pamphlet in the form of an address to the people of Devon, accusing certain members of the British government of having been bribed by the French government. A further pamphlet involved Charles d'Eon de Beaumont, the French minister plenipotentiary to England. A controversy followed, and the House of Commons in 1770 decided that Musgrave's charges were unsubstantiated.

Musgrave then earned a living in London by writing until his death, in reduced circumstances. He wrote several medical works and his edition of Euripides (1778) was considered an advance on that of Joshua Barnes.

== Bibliography ==
- See William Munk, Roll of the Royal College of Physicians, ii (1878)
