= William Senhouse Kirkes =

British physiologist

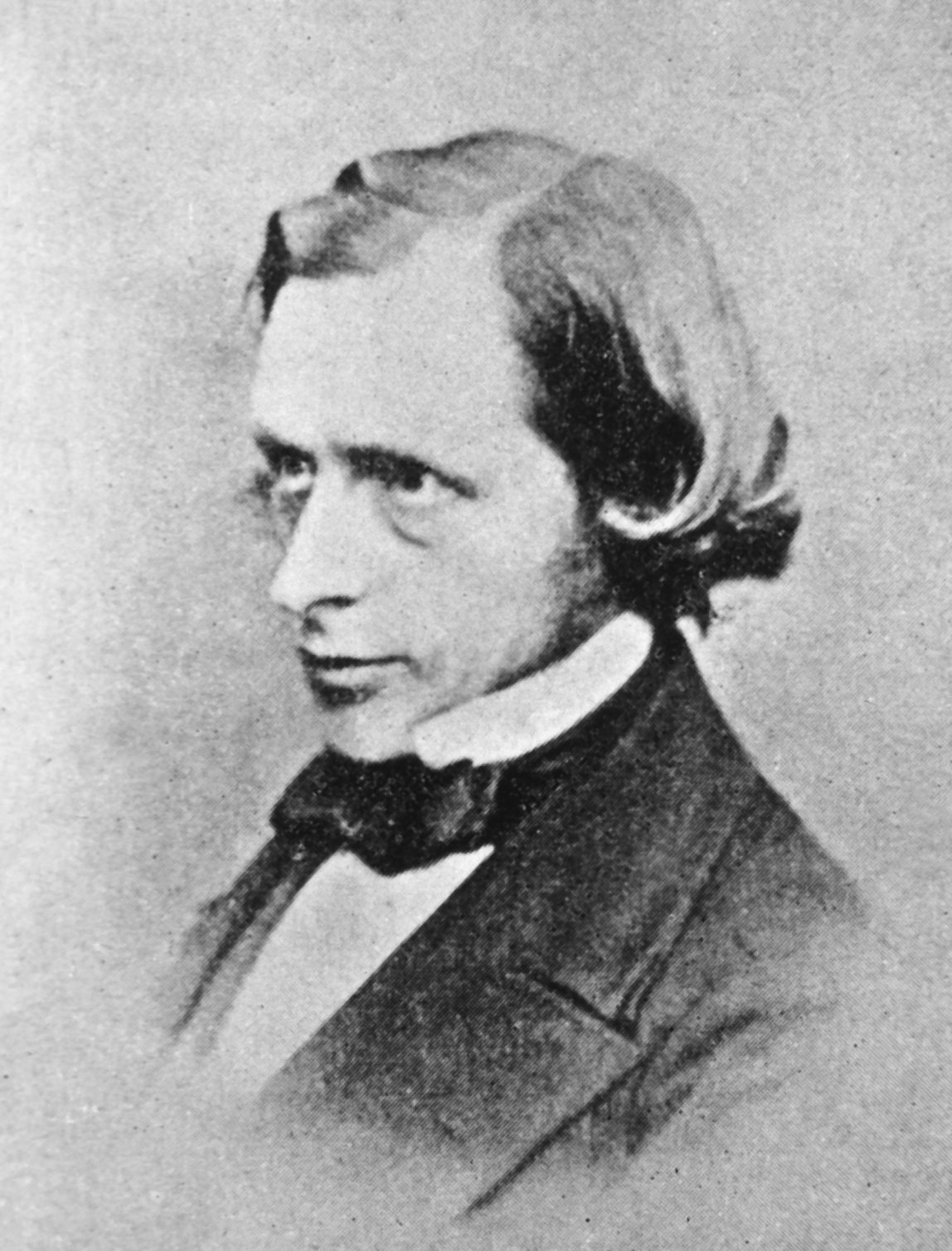

William Senhouse Kirkes (21 January 1822 near Cartmel, Lancashire – 8 December 1864) was an English physiologist noted for his reference work "Kirkes' Physiology" which first appeared in 1848.

== Life ==
He was born in 1823 at Holker in north Lancashire. After education at the grammar school of Cartmel he was, at the age of thirteen, apprenticed to a partnership of surgeons in Lancaster, and went thence to St. Bartholomew's Hospital, London, in 1841. He was distinguished in the school examinations, and in 1846 graduated M.D. at Berlin. In 1855, he was elected a fellow of the Royal College of Physicians of London, and delivered the Gulstonian lectures there in 1856.

Sir James Paget was then warden of the college of St. Bartholomew's Hospital, and in 1848 he and Kirkes published a Handbook of Physiology, which soon became popular among students of medicine. A second edition appeared in 1851, and further editions by Kirkes alone in 1856, 1860, and 1863. In 1867, 1869, 1872, and 1876 further editions by William Morrant Baker appeared. Vincent Dormer Harris was next joined with Baker in several editions, and then edited the book himself, with the assistance of Mr. D'Arcy Power. John Murray, the publisher, to whom it was a valuable property, next employed William Dobbinson Halliburton, under whose care no part of the original work of Kirkes, except his name on the outside cover, remained, and in this form the book goes through almost annual editions, and is still the most popular textbook of physiology for medical students.

Kirkes was appointed demonstrator of morbid anatomy to St. Bartholomew's Hospital in 1848, and in 1854 defeated Dr. John William Hue in a contest for the office of assistant physician. He became lecturer on botany, and then on medicine, and in 1864, when Sir George Burrows resigned, he was elected physician to the hospital.

He died at his house in Lower Seymour Street of double pneumonia with pericarditis after five days' illness on 8 December 1864.

== Work ==
His most original work is a paper in the Transactions of the Royal Medical and Chirurgical Society of London (xxxv. 281 ) on "Embolism, or the carrying of blood-clots from the heart to remote parts of the body," a pathological process then just beginning to be recognised.

Kirkes' main research field was cardiology and vascular disease, and he first described embolism from vegetations in infective endocarditis in 1852. In 1855, he published a paper on apoplexy in Bright's disease, in which he singled out the role played by increased intra-arterial tension in arterial disease.
