= William Whiteman Carlton Topley =

British bacteriologist (1886–1944)

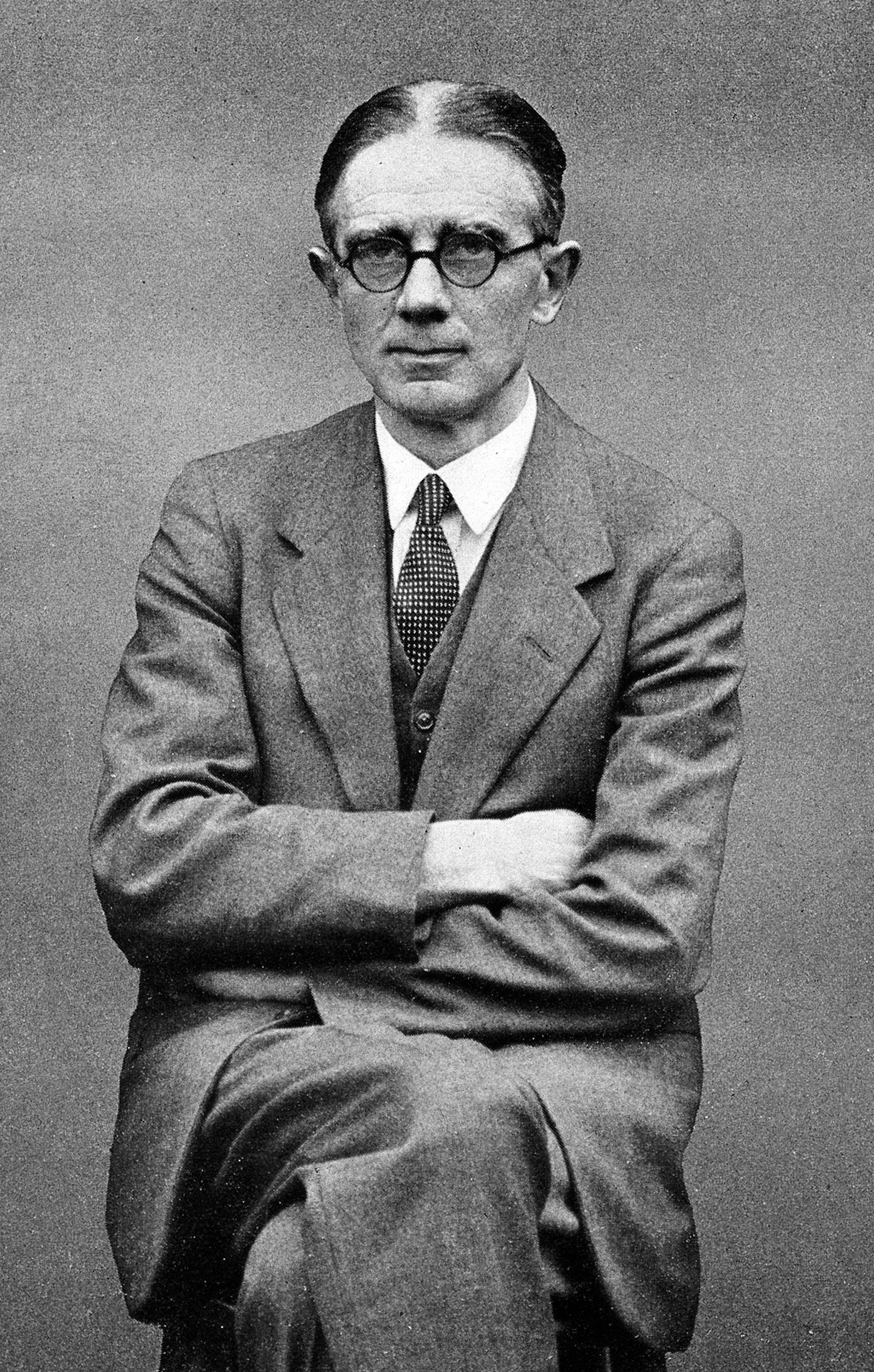
William Whiteman Carlton Topley in 1938

William Whiteman Carlton Topley FRS (19 January 1886 – 21 January 1944) was a British bacteriologist. He was elected a Fellow of the Royal Society in 1930. He gave the Goulstonian Lectures in 1919 and the Milroy Lectures in 1926. Awarded the Royal Medal in 1942.
