= List of fellows of the Royal Society G, H, I =

About 8,000 fellows have been elected to the Royal Society of London since its inception in 1660. Below is a list of people who are or were Fellow or Foreign Member of the Royal Society. The date of election to the fellowship follows the name. Dates in brackets relate to an award or event associated with the person. The Society maintains complete online list. This list is complete up to and including 2019.

List of fellows and foreign members of the Royal Society
A, B, C	D, E, F	G, H, I	J, K, L	M, N, O	P, Q, R	S, T, U, V	W, X, Y, Z

== List of fellows ==
=== G ===
Name	Election date	Notes
Erwin Gabathuler	1990-03-15	Nuclear physicist
Dennis Gabor	1956-03-15	6 June 1900 – 9 February 1979 physicist, Nobel Prize (1971)
Pieter Gabry	1753-03-15	7 May 1770 Dutch lawyer and scientific collector
John Henry Gaddum	1945-03-22	31 March 1900 – 30 June 1965
Hans Friedrich Gadow	1892-06-02	8 March 1855 – 16 May 1928
David Christopher Gadsby	2005-05-26	American physiologist
Joseph Gaertner	1761-11-12	12 March 1732 – ? 14 July 1791
Thomas Gage, 1st Viscount Gage	1728-12-19	21 December 1754
Pratibha Gai	2016-04-29	
William Tennant Gairdner	1893-06-01	8 November 1824 – 28 June 1907
Ernest Frederick Gale	1953-03-19	15 July 1914 – 7 March 2005
Michael Denis Gale	1996-03-14	−18 July 2009 UK plant scientist
Roger Gale	1717-03-28	1672 – 25 June 1744 antiquary
Thomas Gale	1677-12-06	? 1636 – ? 8 April 1702
Antony Galione	2016-04-29	Pharmacologist
Celestino Galiani	1735-01-23	1681–1753
Charles Hyacinth Antoine Gallean	1763-11-10	18 September 1737 – supposed sovereign prince
Prince Demetrius Gallitzin	1798-04-19	21 December 1738 – 21 March 1803 Russian ambassador to France/Netherlands
Thomas Galloway	1834-12-18	27 February 1796 – 1 November 1851
Gallucci	1706-11-20	fl 1706 aka Gatucci or Gatuzzi
Douglas Strutt Galton	1859-06-09	? 2 July 1822 – ? 18 March 1899
Francis Galton	1860-06-07	17 February 1822 – 17 January 1911
Samuel Galton Jr.	1785-12-08	1753–1832
Antonio Galvao	1725-04-15	fl 1725–1730 Portuguese ambassador
James Gambier	1738-03-23	9 September 1745 Consul-general to Netherlands
Frederick William Gamble	1907-05-02	13 July 1869 – 14 September 1926 Zoologist, Univ. of Manchester
James Sykes Gamble	1899-06-01	2 July 1847 – 16 October 1925
Steven J. Gamblin	2011-05-19	
William Alexander Gambling	1983-03-17	
Arthur Gamgee	1872-06-06	10 October 1841 – 29 March 1909
Charon Robin Ganellin	1986-03-20	
Rene Jacques Croissant de Garangeot	1729-01-09	30 June 1688 – 10 December 1759 French surgeon
Laurent Garcin	1730-10-22	1683–1751 French physician and botanist
Alexander Garden	1773-06-10	January 1730 – 15 April 1791
John Stanley Gardiner	1908-05-07	24 January 1872 – 28 February 1946
Samuel John Gardiner	1816-04-04	? 1792 – ? 1854 clergyman
Walter Gardiner	1890-06-05	1 September 1859 – 31 August 1941
Richard Lavenham Gardner	1979-03-15	
Christopher David Garner	1997-05-15	
William Edward Garner	1937-05-06	12 May 1889 – 4 March 1960 chemist, Bristol University
Percy Cyril Claude Garnham	1964-03-19	15 January 1901 – 25 December 1994 parasitologist
Christopher John Raymond Garrett	1993-03-11	
Stephen Denis Garrett	1967-03-16	1 November 1906 – 26 December 1989 mycologist
Alfred Henry Garrod	1876-06-01	18 May 1846 – 17 October 1879
Alfred Baring Garrod	1858-06-03	13 May 1819 – 28 December 1907
Archibald Edward Garrod	1910-05-05	25 November 1857 – 28 March 1936
William Garrow	1807-03-05	13 April 1760 – 24 September 1840
Edward Garth-Turnour, 1st Earl Winterton	1767-04-02	1734 – 10 August 1788
Samuel Garth	1706-06-05	1661 – 18 January 1719
Maxwell Garthshore	1775-03-23	28 October 1732 – 1 March 1812
George Alan Garton	1978-03-16	4 June 1922 – 13 May 2010 biochemist, Aberdeen
William Reginald Stephen Garton	1969-03-20	7 March 1912 – 28 August 2002
Edmund Johnston Garwood	1914-05-07	18 May 1864 – 12 June 1949
Bernard Gascoigne	1667-06-20	1614 – 10 January 1687 Italian diplomat
Robert Gascoyne-Cecil, 5th Marquess of Salisbury	1957-05-30	27 August 1893 – 23 February 1972 Statute 12
Robert Gascoyne-Cecil, 3rd Marquess of Salisbury	1869-01-28	4 February 1830 – 22 August 1903
Walter Holbrook Gaskell	1882-06-08	1 November 1847 – 7 September 1914
Thomas Gaskin	1839-03-21	13 May 1809 – 17 February 1887
Ian Graham Gass	1983-03-17	20 March 1926 – 8 October 1992
John Le Gassick	1673-12-11	1674
John Peter Gassiot	1840-04-09	2 April 1797 – 15 August 1877
Michael Gaster	1985-03-21	
Reginald Ruggles Gates	1931-05-07	1 May 1882 – 12 August 1962
Sidney Barrington Gates	1950-03-16	3 February 1893 – 12 June 1973
Hieronymus David Gaubius	1764-02-23	25 February 1705 – 29 November 1780
John Gauden	1661-12-04	c. 1605–1662 original
Carl Friedrich Gauss	1804-04-12	31 April 1777 – 23 February 1855
Nicholas Gay	1798-11-15	20 September 1803
Robert Gay	1718-11-06	31 October 1738
Alfred Gordon Gaydon	1953-03-19	26 September 1911 – 16 April 2004
Raymond Michael Gaze	1972-03-16	22 June 1927 – 11 September 2012 neuro-biologist
Francis Geach	1767-05-07	1724–1798
Geoffrey Gee	1951-03-15	6 June 1910 – ? 13 December 1996
Orlando Gee	1717-11-30	fl 1717–1723
Alexander Geekie	1710-11-30	13 July 1727
James Murdoch Geikie	1875-06-03	23 August 1839 – 1 March 1915
Archibald Geikie	1865-06-01	28 December 1835 – 10 November 1924, PRS 1908–1913
Andre Konstantin Geim	2007-05-17	physicist
Philip George Houthem Gell	1969-03-20	20 October 1914 – 3 May 2001
William Gell	1807-04-16	1778 – 4 February 1836
James Fairlie Gemmill	1924-05-15	28 November 1867 – 10 February 1926
Adrien Marie Le Gendre	1789-04-30	18 September 1752 – ? 10 January 1833 mathematician
Jean Alexandre Genevois	1761-02-19	fl 1761
Claude Joseph Geoffroy	1715-06-09	8 August 1685 – 9 March 1752
Etienne Francois Geoffroy	1698-07-06	14 February 1672 – 6 January 1731
George II, King of Great Britain and Ireland	1727-07-11	10 November 1683 – 25 October 1760 poyal
George IV, King of Great Britain and Ireland	1820-05-18	12 August 1762 – 25 June 1830 royal
George V, King of Great Britain and Ireland	1893-06-08	3 June 1865 – 20 January 1936 royal
George VI, King of Great Britain and Ireland	1932-06-16	15 December 1895 – 6 February 1952 royal Fellow; Patron 1936
George, Prince of Denmark	1704-11-30	23 April 1653 – 28 October 1708 royal
Neville George	1963-03-21	13 May 1904 – 18 June 1980
John Georges	1719-11-30	fl 1719–1738
Henry Walther Gerdes	1726-05-12	24 August 1690 – January 1742
Christian Ludwig Gersten	1733-10-25	7 February 1701 – 13 August 1762
Zoubin Ghahramani	2015-05-01	1970-02-08 – professor of information engineering
Michel Agnola Giacomelli	1740-11-06	11 September 1695 – 17 April 1774
Alexander Gibb	1936-05-07	12
Claude Dixon Gibb	1946-03-21	29 June 1898 – 15 January 1959
George Smith Gibbes	1796-02-18	1771 – 23 June 1851
Edward Gibbon	1788-11-27	27 April 1737 – 16 January 1794
Gary William Gibbons	1999-05-13	
Ian Read Gibbons	1983-03-17	
James Gibbs	1729-10-16	23 December 1682 – 5 August 1754
Alan Frank Gibson	1978-03-16	30 May 1923 – 27 March 1988
Charles Stanley Gibson	1931-05-07	9 February 1884 – 24 March 1950
Frank William Ernest Gibson	1976-03-18	
Quentin Howieson Gibson	1969-03-20	9 December 1918 – 16 March 2011
Vernon Charles Gibson	2004-05-27	
Walcot Gibson	1925-05-07	24 August 1864 – 28 November 1941
Hardinge Giffard, 1st Earl of Halsbury	1887-01-13	3 September 1823 – 11 December 1921
Tony Giffard, 3rd Earl of Halsbury	1969-03-20	4 June 1908 – 4 January 2000
Sir Robert Giffen	1892-06-02	22 July 1837 – ? 10 April 1910
James William Gilbart	1846-06-18	21 March 1794 – 8 August 1863
Davies Gilbert	1791-11-17	6 March 1767 – 24 December 1839, PRS 1827–1830
Geoffrey Alan Gilbert	1973-03-15	3 December 1917 – 1 March 2005
Harry Gilbert	2016-04-29	
John Davies Gilbert	1834-04-10	5 December 1811 – 16 April 1854
Jeffrey Gilbert	1726-05-12	1674 – 14 October 1726 chief baron of exchequer
Joseph Henry Gilbert	1860-06-07	1 August 1817 – 23 December 1901
Percy Carlyle Gilchrist	1891-06-04	27 December 1851 – 16 December 1935
Moreton Gilkes	1735-04-24	1750
Adrian Edward Gill	1986-03-20	23 February 1937 – 19 April 1986
David Gill	1883-06-07	12 June 1843 – 24 January 1914
Patrick Gill	2016-04-29	Physicist
Westby Gill	1740-02-07	1679 – October 1746
Hugh Gillan	1795-02-12	19 May 1798
Ronald James Gillespie	1977-03-17	
John Gillies	1789-01-29	18 January 1747 – 15 February 1836
John Gillon	1809-03-23	c. 1748 – 14 December 1809
Gerard F. Gilmore	2013-05-02	
James Gimzewski	2009-05-15	
Jean Patrice Piers de Girardin	1732-04-27	fl 1732
John Girle	1754-02-07	5 July 1761
Thomas Gisborne	1758-11-16	24 February 1806 physician
Hieronymus Giuntini	1731-05-27	1744
Lynn Faith Gladden	2004-05-27	
John Hall Gladstone	1853-06-02	7 March 1827 – 6 October 1902
William Ewart Gladstone	1881-01-13	29 December 1809 – 19 May 1898
James Glaisher	1849-06-07	8 April 1809 – 7 February 1903
James Whitbread Lee Glaisher	1875-06-03	5 November 1848 – 7 December 1928
Joseph Glanvill	1664-12-14	1636 – 4 November 1680
William Henry Glanville	1958-03-20	2 February 1900 – 30 June 1976
David Victor Glass	1971-03-18	2 January 1911 – 23 September 1978, demographer
Samuel Glasse	1764-07-05	1735 – 27 April 1812
Hermann Glauert	1931-05-07	4 October 1892 – 4 August 1934
Richard Tetley Glazebrook	1882-06-08	18 September 1854 – 15 December 1935
James Glenie	1779-03-18	1750 – 23 November 1817
Alexander Thomas Glenny	1944-03-16	18 September 1882 – 5 October 1965
Francis Glisson	1661-03-06	1597 – ? 14 October 1677 Original
Anne Glover	2016-04-29	19 April 1956 –
David Moore Glover	2009-05-15	
George Glover	1832-06-09	1778 – 4 May 1862 clergyman
Keith Glover	1993-03-11	
Nigel Glover	2013-05-02	Particle physicist
Philips Glover	1723-05-02	1697 – ? 18 June 1745
Peter David Gluckman	2001-05-10	
Eugen Glueckauf	1969-03-20	9 April 1906 – 12 September 1981
Ian Michael Glynn	1970-03-19	
Joseph Glynn	1838-02-08	7 February 1799 – 6 February 1863 steam engineer
Philip Friedrich Gmelin	1758-02-16	19 August 1721 – 9 May 1768
Jonathan Goddard	1660-11-28	c. 1617 – 24 March 1675 founder fellow
Michael Edward Goddard	2015-05-01	Animal geneticist
Peter Goddard	1989-03-16	
Hugh Charles Jonathan Godfray	2001-05-10	
Ambrose Godfrey-Hanckwitz	1730-01-22	1660 – 15 January 1741
John Godfrey	1715-11-10	fl 1715 astronomer
Louis Godin	1735-03-27	29 February 1704 – 11 September 1760
Frederick DuCane Godman	1882-06-08	15 January 1834 – 19 February 1919
William Godolphin	1664-11-02	? February 1635 – 11 July 1696
William Man Godschall	1758-02-16	c. 1719 – 1 December 1802
Henry Haversham Godwin-Austen	1880-06-03	6 July 1834 – 2 December 1923
Robert Alfred Cloyne Godwin-Austen	1849-06-07	19 March 1808 – 25 November 1884
George Godwin	1839-03-07	28 January 1815 – 27 January 1888
Harry Godwin	1945-03-22	9 May 1901 – 12 August 1985
Michel Goedert	2000-05-11	
Ernest Gold	1918-05-02	24 July 1881 – 30 January 1976 meteorologist
Thomas Gold	1964-03-19	22 May 1920 – 22 June 2004, physicist, astronomer
Victor Gold	1972-03-16	29 June 1922 – 29 September 1985
George Dashwood Taubman Goldie	1902-05-15	20 May 1846 – 20 August 1925
John Goldingham	1808-05-26	c. 1766 – ? 7 June 1849
George Ridsdale Goldsbrough	1929-05-02	19 May 1881 – 26 May 1963
Isaac Lyon Goldsmid	1828-03-13	13 January 1778 – 27 April 1859
Raymond E. Goldstein	2013-05-02	
Sydney Goldstein	1937-05-06	3 December 1903 – 22 January 1989, fluid mechanics
Jeffrey Goldstone	1977-03-17	
William Gomildon	1663-11-11	c. 1691
Benjamin Gompertz	1819-01-28	5 March 1779 – 14 July 1865, actuary mathematician
John Mason Good	1808-03-31	25 May 1764 – 2 January 1827
Melvyn A. Goodale	2013-05-02	
John William Goodby	2011-05-19	
Edmund Goodenough	1824-04-01	6 April 1785 – 2 May 1845
George Trenchard Goodenough	1787-12-06	1743 –
Samuel Goodenough, Bishop of Carlisle	1789-05-14	29 April 1743 – 12 August 1827
Charles Frederick Goodeve	1940-03-14	22 February 1904 – 7 April 1980
Tom Goodey	1947-03-20	28 July 1885 – 7 July 1953
Peter Neville Goodfellow	1992-03-12	
Christopher Carl Goodnow	2009-05-15	
Edwin Stephen Goodrich	1905-05-11	21 June 1868 – 6 January 1946
John Goodricke	1786-04-06	17 September 1764 – 20 April 1786
John Goodsir	1846-06-11	? 20 March 1814 – 6 March 1867
Graham Clifford Goodwin	2002-05-09	
Leonard George Goodwin	1976-03-18	
Trevor Walworth Goodwin	1968-03-21	
Goodwyn	1681-04-27	fl 1681 merchant
Roger Goody	2018-05-09	17 April 1944 –
Coluthur Gopalan	1987-03-19	
Charles Gordon-Lennox, 5th Duke of Richmond	1840-04-02	3 August 1791 – 21 October 1860
Alexander Gordon, 4th Duke of Gordon	1784-06-24	June 1743 – 17 June 1827
George Hamilton Gordon, 4th Earl of Aberdeen	1808-04-28	28 January 1784 – 14 December 1860
Henry Percy Gordon	1830-12-09	21 October 1806 – 29 July 1876
James Alexander Gordon	1835-04-02	1793 – 18 April 1872 physician
James Willoughby Gordon	1801-06-11	1773 – ? 4 January 1851
Mervyn Henry Gordon	1924-05-15	22 June 1872 – 26 July 1953 pathologist
Michael John Caldwell Gordon	1994-03-10	
Patrick Gordon	1694-11-30	July 1702 clergyman
Robert Gordon	1686-02-03	7 March 1647 – ? 5 October 1704 Scottish MP and courtier
Siamon Gordon	2007-05-17	
Thomas Gordon	1821-02-08	8 December 1788 – 20 April 1841
George Gore	1865-06-01	22 January 1826 – ? 23 December 1908 electrochemist, Birmingham
Peter Alfred Gorer	1960-03-24	14 April 1907 – 11 May 1961
Antonio Francesco Gori	1738-05-04	9 December 1691 – 21 January 1757
John Eldon Gorst	1896-12-17	24 May 1835 – 4 April 1916
David de Gorter	1760-02-21	30 April 1717 – 1783
George Joachim Goschen, 1st Viscount Goschen	1872-01-18	10 August 1831 – 7 February 1907
Philip Henry Gosse	1856-06-05	6 April 1810 – 23 August 1888
Isaac Gosset	1772-06-18	? 1735 – 12 December 1812 proctor, Doctors Commons
George Gostling	1793-12-12	c. 1745 – 27 May 1821
Francis Gotch	1892-06-02	13 July 1853 – 15 July 1913
Georg Gottlob	2010-05-20	
Douglas Owen Gough	1997-05-15	
H. J. Gough	1933-05-11	26 April 1890 – 1 June 1965, engineer at NPL and pioneer in metal fatigue
Richard Gough	1775-03-09	21 October 1735 – 20 February 1809
Henry Goulburn	1820-04-27	19 March 1784 – 12 January 1856
John Gould	1843-01-19	14 September 1804 – 3 February 1881
William Gould	1774-05-12	c. 1719 – 16 March 1799
William Gould	1683-05-02	c. 1652 – ? October 1686 physician
Jonathan Gouldsmyth	1730-01-15	? May 1694 – ? 17 April 1732 Physician
Véronique Gouverneur	2019-04-16	8 November 1964 –
Neil Gow	2016-04-29	biologist
James Learmonth Gowans	1963-03-21	
William Richard Gowers	1887-06-09	20 March 1845 – 4 May 1915
William Timothy Gowers	1999-05-13	
Margaret Mary Gowing	1988-06-30	26 April 1921 – 7 November 1998 statute 12
William Gowland	1908-05-07	16 December 1842 – 10 June 1922
James de Graaff-Hunter	1935-05-16	11 September 1881 – 3 February 1967 geodesist, Survey of India
John Hilton Grace	1908-05-07	21 May 1873 – 4 March 1958
Michael Anthony Grace	1967-03-16	13 May 1920 – 17 May 1988
William Graeme	1730-04-30	c. 1700 – 19 February 1745 Fellow 1731-04-30
William Graeme	1766-03-13	fl 1766
Alan Grafen	2011-05-19	
George Stuart Graham-Smith	1919-05-15	25 September 1875 – 30 August 1950 pathologist, hygienist
Francis Graham-Smith	1970-03-19	
Aaron Graham	1785-03-17	fl 1785 Astronomer
Alastair Graham	1979-03-15	6 November 1906 – 12 December 2000 zoologist
Christopher Forbes Graham	1981-03-19	
George Graham	1721-03-09	7 July 1673 – ? 20 November 1751
Ian Graham	2016-04-29	Geneticist
James Graham, 1st Duke of Montrose	1707-05-28	c. 1680 – 7 January 1742
Richard Graham	1726-11-17	8 March 1693 – 8 May 1749 comptroller of Westminster Bridge
James Robert George Graham	1831-12-22	1 June 1792 – 25 October 1861
Thomas Graham	1836-12-15	? 20 December 1805 – ? 11 September 1869
Richard Dugard Grainger	1846-01-22	1801 – 1 February 1865
Guido Grandi	1709-05-04	1 October 1671 – 4 July 1742
Jacobus Grandi	1690-12-01	1646 – 11 February 1691 Italian anatomist
Mountstuart Elphinstone Grant Duff	1881-02-03	22 February 1829 – ? 12 January 1906
Barbara Rosemary Grant	2007-05-17	
Charles Grant, 1st Baron Glenelg	1828-03-27	26 October 1778 – 23 April 1866
Ian Philip Grant	1992-03-12	
James Augustus Grant	1873-06-12	12 April 1827 – 11 February 1892
John Grant	1779-11-11	fl 1779 president of Royal Institution
Ludovick Alexander Grant	1791-03-10	fl 1791
Peter Raymond Grant	1987-03-19	
Robert Grant	1865-06-01	17 June 1814 – 24 October 1892 astronomer
Robert Edmond Grant	1836-02-04	11 November 1793 – 23 August 1874
Ronald Thomson Grant	1934-05-03	5 November 1892 – 7 November 1989
Sir Thomas Tassell Grant	1840-05-21	1795 – 15 October 1859
Augustus Bozzi Granville	1817-11-20	7 October 1783 – 3 March 1872, 1817, physician and writer
John Graunt	1662-02-26	24 April 1620 – 18 April 1674
William Gravatt	1832-02-02	14 July 1806 – 30 May 1866 civil engineer
Charles Graves	1880-06-03	6 November 1812 – 17 July 1899
John Thomas Graves	1839-04-18	4 December 1806 – 29 March 1870 barrister
Robert James Graves	1850-06-06	? 27 March 1797 – 20 March 1853
Andrew Gray	1896-06-04	2 July 1847 – 10 October 1925
Charles Gray	1754-06-13	1696–1782
Edward George Gray	1976-03-18	11 January 1924 – 14 August 1999
Edward Whitaker Gray	1779-02-11	1748 – 27 December 1806 Librarian, RCP
Francis Gray, 14th Baron Gray	1816-02-15	1 September 1765 – 20 August 1842 Scottish peer, PMG (Scotland)
George Robert Gray	1865-06-01	? July 1808 – 5 May 1872
George William Gray	1983-03-17	4 September 1926 – 12 May 2013
Henry Gray	1852-06-03	c. 1827 – ? 8 June 1861
James Gray	1929-05-02	14 October 1891 – 14 December 1975
John Gray	1732-03-16	17 July 1769 mathematician, navy Office
John Archibald Browne Gray	1972-03-16	30 March 1918 – 4 January 2011
John Edward Gray	1832-02-02	13 February 1800 – 7 March 1875
Joseph Alexander Gray	1932-05-05	8 February 1884 – 5 March 1966 physicist
Louis Harold Gray	1961-03-16	10 November 1905 – 8 July 1965
Peter Gray	1977-03-17	25 August 1926 – 7 June 2012
Robert Gray	1728-05-02	fl 1728–1731 East India coy factor
Stephen Gray	1733-01-25	? 1666 – ? 25 February 1736
Richard Wilson Greatheed	1793-11-21	fl 1793
Thomas Greatorex	1819-03-11	5 October 1758 – 18 July 1831
Melvyn Francis Greaves	2003-05-15	
William Michael Herbert Greaves	1943-03-18	10 September 1897 – 24 December 1955
Albert Edward Green	1958-03-20	11 November 1912 – 12 August 1999
Alexander Henry Green	1886-06-04	10 October 1832 – 19 August 1896
Arthur George Green	1915-05-06	28 February 1865 – 12 September 1941 chemist
Ben Joseph Green	2010-05-20	
David Headley Green	1991-03-14	Geologist, Tasmania
James Alexander Green	1987-03-19	26 February 1926 – 7 April 2014 mathematician
Joseph Henry Green	1825-02-24	1 November 1791 – 13 December 1863 surgeon
Joseph Reynolds Green	1895-06-13	3 December 1848 – 3 June 1914
Malcolm Leslie Hodder Green	1985-03-21	
Martin Green	2013-05-02	
Michael Boris Green	1989-03-16	string theorist
Norman Michael Green	1981-03-19	
Peter James Green	2003-05-15	
Richard Green	1753-05-31	28 June 1708 – June 1786 clergyman
William Green	1790-04-29	4 April 1725 – 10 January 1811 soldier
Thomas Greene	1798-03-22	10 December 1737 – 1810 antiquarian
Thomas Greene	1711-11-30	11 January 1745
William Greene	1729-11-06	12 March 1737 surgeon
Alfred George Greenhill	1888-06-07	29 November 1847 – 10 February 1859
Edward Headlam Greenhow	1870-06-02	10 December 1814 – 22 November 1888
Dennis James Greenland	1994-03-10	
George Bellas Greenough	1807-03-05	18 January 1778 – 2 April 1855
William Greenwell	1878-06-06	23 March 1820 – 27 January 1918
Brian Mellor Greenwood	1998-05-14	tropical diseases
Duncan Joseph Greenwood	1985-03-21	16 October 1932 – 13 February 2010 soil scientist, Wellesbourne
Geoffrey Wilson Greenwood	1992-03-12	Materials Scientist, Sheffield Univ
Major Greenwood	1928-05-10	9 August 1880 – 5 October 1949 epidemiologist, London Univ.
Norman Neill Greenwood	1987-03-19	19 January 1925 – 14 November 2012 inorganic chemist Univ of Leeds
Peter Humphry Greenwood	1985-03-21	21 April 1927 – 3 March 1995 ichthyologist, Uganda
John Greg	1772-07-09	1795
Henry Gregg	1798-12-06	fl 1798
James Gregorie	1668-06-11	November 1638 – October 1675 mathematician
David Gregory	1692-11-30	? 24 June 1661 – 10 October 1708
Frederick Gugenheim Gregory	1940-03-14	22 December 1893 – 27 November 1961
John Gregory	1756-11-04	3 June 1724 – 9 February 1773
John Walter Gregory	1901-06-06	27 January 1864 – 2 June 1932
Jonathan M. Gregory	2017-05-05	
Philip Herries Gregory	1962-03-15	24 July 1907 – 9 February 1956 biologist
Richard Gregory	1803-11-24	3 August 1839
Richard Arman Gregory	1933-06-22	29 January 1864 – 15 September 1952 Statute, astronomer
Richard Langton Gregory	1992-03-12	24 July 1923 – 17 May 2010 neuropsychologist, Bristol
Roderic Alfred Gregory	1965-03-18	29 December 1913 – 5 September 1990
William Henry Gregory	1878-02-14	? 12 July 1817 – 6 March 1892
Samuel Greig	1782-03-14	30 November 1735 – October 1788
Woronzow Greig	1833-02-07	c. 1805 – 20 October 1865
Bryan Thomas Grenfell	2004-05-27	
William Wyndham Grenville, 1st Baron Grenville	1818-04-23	25 October 1759 – 12 January 1834
Charles Gresham	1688-11-30	? 31 May 1660 – 28 March 1718
Thomas Gresley	1784-04-22	18 April 1785
Richard Greswell	1830-06-10	22 July 1800 – 22 July 1881
Charles Francis Greville	1772-02-13	12 May 1749 – 23 April 1809
George Greville, 2nd Earl of Warwick	1767-12-17	16 September 1746 – 2 May 1816
Robert Fulke Greville	1794-04-03	4 February 1751 – 27 April 1824
Nehemiah Grew	1671-11-02	? September 1641 – 25 March 1712
Philip de Malpas Grey-Egerton	1831-02-10	13 November 1806 – 5 April 1881
Clare P Grey	2011-05-19	
Thomas Grey	1815-02-16	17 July 1846 surgeon
Thomas de Grey, 2nd Baron Walsingham	1778-03-05	14 July 1748 – 16 January 1818
Thomas de Grey, 6th Baron Walsingham	1887-06-09	29 July 1843 – 3 December 1919
Thomas Philip De Grey, 2nd Earl De Grey	1841-04-29	8 December 1781 – 14 November 1859
Thomas Grey, 2nd Earl of Stamford	1708-05-12	1654 – 31 January 1720
Donald Grierson	2000-05-11	
Johann Peter Griess	1868-06-04	6 September 1829 – 30 August 1888 chemist
James Grieve	1769-02-23	9 July 1773
John Grieve	1794-05-22	fl 1794
Alan Arnold Griffith	1941-03-20	13 June 1893 – 11 October 1963
Edward Griffith	1834-04-10	1790 – 8 January 1858
Ernest Howard Griffiths	1895-06-13	15 June 1851 – 3 March 1932
Ezer Griffiths	1926-05-06	27 November 1888 – 14 February 1962
Gillian Griffiths	2013-05-02	
John Griffiths	1806-05-01	fl 1806 HEIC, Sumatra
Robert Charles Griffiths	2010-05-20	
Ronald Ernest Grigg	1999-05-13	
Pietro Grimani	1712-10-23	5 October 1677 – 7 March 1752
John Philip Grime	1998-05-14	
Robin William Grimes	2018-05-09	computational materials scientist
Geoffrey Richard Grimett	2014-04-30	20 December 1950 –
James Bucknall Grimston, 3rd Viscount Grimston and Baron Dunboyne	1786-02-02	9 May 1747 – 30 December 1808
Richard Grindall	1758-04-06	? August 1716 – 30 April 1797 surgeon
Nigel David Forster Grindley	2006-05-18	
Steddy Grinfield	1767-04-02	18 September 1808
Jean de la Grive	1734-01-24	1689–1757
Laurence Theodore Gronovius	1763-03-10	1730 – ? 1778
Percy Groom	1924-05-15	12 September 1865 – 16 September 1931 wood technologist
Stephen Groombridge	1812-02-27	7 January 1755 – 30 March 1832
Frederick Le Gros Clark	1872-06-06	8 February 1811 – 19 July 1892 surgeon, PRCS
Wilfrid Edward Le Gros Clark	1935-05-16	5 June 1895 – 28 June 1971
Pierre-Jean Grosley	1766-02-20	18 November 1718 – 1785
Mark William Gross	2017-05-05	30 November 1965 -
Franklin Gerardus Grosveld	1991-03-14	cell biologist
Richard Grosvenor, 1st Earl Grosvenor	1777-02-13	18 June 1731 – 5 August 1802
George Grote	1857-06-11	17 November 1794 – 18 June 1871
Edmond Herbert Grove-Hills	1911-05-04	1 August 1864 – 2 October 1922
William Robert Grove	1840-11-26	11 July 1811 – ? 2 August 1896
John Grover	1830-04-22	c. 1796 – 6 November 1847
Howard Grubb	1883-06-07	1844–1931
Thomas Grubb	1864-06-02	4 August 1800 – 19 September 1878
Hans Grüneberg	1956-03-15	26 May 1907 – 23 October 1982
David Gubbins	1996-03-14	Geophysicist
Edwin Guest	1839-06-20	1800–23 November 1880
Josiah John Guest	1830-06-10	2 February 1785 – 29 November 1862
John Rodney Guest	1986-03-20	Microbiologist
Edward Armand Guggenheim	1946-03-21	11 August 1901 – 9 August 1970
Joseph de Guignes	1752-02-20	19 October 1721 – 19 March 1800
John Lewis Guillemard	1806-01-16	31 August 1764 - 22 November 1844
Rainer Walter Guillery	1983-03-17	
Edward Cecil Guinness, 1st Earl of Iveagh	1906-11-01	10 November 1847 - 7 October 1927 Statute 12
Rupert Edward Cecil Lee Guinness, 2nd Earl of Iveagh	1964-05-21	29 March 1874 - 14 September 1967 statute 12
Antoine de Guiscard, Marquis of Guiscard	1706-06-05	27 December 1658 - 28 March 1711
John Guise	1716-11-30	12 June 1765
Keith Gull	2003-05-15	microbiologist
William Withey Gull	1869-06-03	31 December 1816 - 29 January 1890
John Alan Gulland	1984-03-15	16 September 1926 - 24 June 1990
John Masson Gulland	1945-03-22	14 October 1898 - 26 October 1947
George Gulliver	1839-03-07	4 June 1804 - 17 November 1882
Ronald Campbell Gunn	1854-06-01	4 April 1808 – 14 March 1881
Brian Edgar Scourse Gunning	1980-03-20	
John Gunning	1782-04-25	14 February 1798
Albert Charles Lewis Gottgilf Günther	1867-06-06	3 October 1830 – 1 February 1914
Henry Brougham Guppy	1918-05-02	23 December 1854 – 23 April 1926
John Bertrand Gurdon	1971-03-18	
Hudson Gurney	1818-01-15	19 January 1775 - 9 November 1864
Russell Gurney	1875-04-22	2 September 1804 - 31 May 1878
Gustav Adolf, King of Sweden	1959-05-21	11 November 1882 - 15 September 1973 royal fellow
Herbert Gutfreund	1981-03-19	
Frederick Guthrie	1871-06-08	15 October 1833 - 21 October 1886
George James Guthrie	1827-05-24	1 May 1785 - 1 May 1856
Matthew Guthrie	1782-04-11	1743 - 7 August 1807
Ludwig Guttmann	1976-03-18	3 July 1899 – 18 Mar 1980 neurologist
Henry Lewis Guy	1936-05-07	15 June 1887 – 20 July 1956
William Augustus Guy	1866-06-07	13 June 1810 – 10 September 1885
Claude Marie Guyon	1746-04-10	13 December 1699 - 1771
Louis Bernard Guyton de Morveau	1788-04-03	4 January 1737 - 2 January 1816
Sir Rowland Gwynne	1681-11-23	1 January 1658 - 24 January 1726
William Ewart Gye	1938-03-17	11 August 1884 - ? 13 October 1952
Count Carl Gyllenborg	1711-11-30	7 March 1679 - 9 December 1746

=== H ===
Name	Election date	Notes
Theodore Haak	1663-05-20	25 July 1605 – ? May 1690 Original
Julius von Haast	1867-06-06	? 1 May 1824 – ? 15 August 1887
Christopher Hacon	2019-04-16	14 February 1970 –
Albert George Hadcock	1918-05-02	22 March 1861 – 4 June 1936
Alfred Cort Haddon	1899-06-01	24 May 1855 – 20 April 1940
Alexander John Haddow	1972-03-16	27 December 1912 – 26 December 1978
Alexander Haddow	1958-03-20	18 January 1907 – 21 January 1976
Muhammad ibn Haddu	1682-04-26	fl 1682
Robert Abbott Hadfield	1909-05-06	28 November 1858 – 30 September 1940
George Hadley	1735-02-20	13 February 1685 – 28 June 1768
John Hadley	1717-03-21	16 April 1682 – 14 February 1744 mathematician
John Hadley	1758-05-25	1731 – 5 November 1764 chemist
Hendrik van Haemstede	1761-03-12	8 September 1690 – 31 May 1765
Joanna Haigh	2013-05-02	
Francis Haggitt	1820-04-20	29 July 1825 Clergyman
Robert Wolseley Haig	1867-06-06	21 December 1830 – 6 June 1872 Military astronomer
John Haighton	1815-04-06	c. 1755 – 23 March 1823
John Hailstone	1801-05-07	13 December 1759 – 9 June 1847
Martin Hairer	2014-04-30	14 November 1975 –
Edward Haistwell	1698-11-09	1658 – 4 January 1709
Frederick Duncan Michael Haldane	1996-03-14	physicist, Princeton
John Burdon Sanderson Haldane	1932-05-05	5 November 1892 – 1 December 1964
John Scott Haldane	1897-06-03	3 May 1860 – 15 March 1936
Richard Burdon Haldane, Viscount Haldane of Cloan	1906-11-01	31 July 1856 – 19 August 1928 Statute 12
Richard Hale	1721-03-09	1670 – 26 September 1728 physician, London
Charles Nicholas Hales	1992-03-12	25 April 1935 – 15 September 2005 medical biochemist
Stephen Hales	1718-03-13	? 17 September 1677 – 4 January 1761 physiologist and inventor
Henry Halford	1810-03-08	2 October 1766 – 9 March 1844
Stephen Edgar Halford	2004-05-27	biochemist, Bristol University
Alan Hall	1999-05-13	microbiologist, New York
Alfred Daniel Hall	1909-05-06	22 June 1864 – 5 July 1942
Arnold Alexander Hall	1953-03-19	23 April 1915 – 9 January 2000
Arthur Lewis Hall	1935-05-16	10 January 1872 – 13 August 1955 geologist, South Africa
Basil Hall	1816-03-28	31 December 1788 – 11 September 1844
Benjamin Hall	1812-04-23	31 July 1817
Fayrer Hall	1732-03-30	c. 1756
Henry Hall	1676-02-10	fl 1670–1692 lawyer, Sheriff of Gloucestershire (1688)
Henry Edgar Hall	1982-03-18	
James Hall	1806-05-22	17 January 1761 – 23 June 1832 Geology, Chemistry
John Hall	1820-04-27	16 September 1787 – 2 April 1860 Geology, Chemistry
Marshall Hall	1832-04-05	19 February 1790 – ? 11 May 1857
Michael George Hall	1993-03-11	
Peter Gavin Hall	2000-05-11	
Philip Hall	1942-03-19	11 April 1904 – 30 December 1982
Thomas Henry Hall	1827-11-22	1796 – 24 December 1870
Wendy Hall	2009-05-15	
William Hutcheon Hall	1847-04-22	c. 1797 – 25 June 1878
Henry Hallam	1821-03-08	9 July 1777 – 21 January 1859
Albrecht von Haller	1739-11-01	16 October 1708 – 12 December 1777
Edmond Halley	1678-11-30	? 8 November 1656 – ? 14 January 1742
William Dobinson Halliburton	1891-06-04	21 June 1860 – 21 May 1931
Alexander Norman Halliday	2000-05-11	
Robert Hallifax	1785-04-21	c. 1735 – 17 September 1810
James Orchard Halliwell-Phillipps	1839-05-30	21 June 1820 – 3 January 1889
Charles Skinner Hallpike	1956-03-15	19 July 1900 – 26 September 1979
Jack Halpern	1974-03-21	
Edmund Halswell	1834-04-10	fl 1834
Hugh Hamersley	1779-12-16	22 January 1790
John Hamett	1835-02-05	1847
Yusuf Hamied	2019-04-16	Honorary Fellow
Alexander Hamilton	1808-01-14	1762 – 30 December 1824 Sanskrit scholar
Andrew David Hamilton	2004-05-27	
Anthony Hamilton	1777-05-01	5 May 1739 – 4 October 1812 Archdeacon
Archibald Hamilton	1795-04-23	fl 1795
Charles Hamilton	1747-03-26	? November 1704 – 11 September 1786
David Hamilton	1708-04-07	1663 – 28 August 1721 Physician
David James Hamilton	1908-05-07	6 March 1849 – 19 February 1909 Prof of Pathology, Aberdeen
Henry Parr Hamilton	1828-01-17	3 April 1794 – 7 February 1880 Mathematician and Dean of Salisbury
Hugh Hamilton	1761-02-19	26 March 1729 – 1 December 1805
James Hamilton, 5th Duke of Hamilton	1736-04-08	5 January 1703 – 2 March 1743
James Hamilton, 7th Earl of Abercorn	1715-11-10	22 March 1686 – 11 January 1744
John Hamilton	1734-11-21	fl 1734 Clerk, Court of Chancery
John Hamilton	1746-03-13	18 December 1755 Naval officer
Robert Hamilton	1819-02-11	8 October 1832 Clergyman
Thomas Hamilton, 9th Earl of Haddington	1844-04-18	21 June 1780 – 1 December 1858
William Hamilton	1766-11-06	13 December 1730 – 6 April 1803
William Hamilton	1855-06-07	5 July 1805 – 27 June 1867
William Donald Hamilton	1980-03-20	1 August 1936 – 7 March 2000
William Richard Hamilton	1813-04-08	9 January 1777 – 11 July 1859
John Michael Hammersley	1976-03-18	21 March 1920 – 2 May 2004
Dalziel Llewellyn Hammick	1952-03-20	8 March 1887 – 17 October 1966
Anthony Hammond	1698-11-30	1 September 1668 – 30 March 1739
Bartholomew Hammond	1754-03-14	1776
John Hammond	1933-05-11	24 February 1889 – 25 August 1964
William Hammond	1663-05-20	? 1614 – ? 1685 Original fellow
Andrew Snape Hamond	1797-03-02	17 December 1738 – 12 October 1828
Joannes Henricus Hampe	1730-02-05	1697–1777 German Physician & Metallurgist
Charles Douglas Richard Hanbury-Tracy, 4th Baron Sudeley	1888-03-22	3 July 1840 – 9 December 1922
Daniel Hanbury	1867-06-06	11 September 1825 – 24 March 1875 Pharmaceutical Chemist
William Hanbury	1728-05-02	March 1768
John Handfield	1816-03-07	Soldier, Royal Engineers
Mark Handley	2019-04-16	
Nicholas Charles Handy	1990-03-15	17 June 1941 – 2 October 2012 Chemist
Charles Samuel Hanes	1942-03-19	21 May 1903 – 6 July 1990
Maurice Pascal Alers Hankey, 1st Baron Hankey of the Chart	1942-06-18	2 April 1877 – 26 January 1963 Statute
Edward Hanmer	1817-01-23	16 July 1758 – 24 July 1821
Thomas Hanmer	1804-06-21	5 April 1747 – 4 October 1828
David C. Hanna	1998-05-14	
James Hannen, Baron Hannen	1891-03-12	19 March 1821 – 29 March 1894
David Hannisius	1678-11-30	1681
Gregory Hannon	2018-05-09	1964
Jean-Pierre Hansen	2002-05-09	
John Jacob Hansler	1838-01-18	1788 – 28 April 1867
Emmeline Jean Hanson	1967-03-16	14 November 1919 – 10 August 1973 Biophysicist
Nicholas Paul Harberd	2009-05-15	
Jeffrey Barry Harborne	1995-03-09	1 September 1928 – 21 July 2002
Erasmus Harby	1668-04-16	? February 1628 – ? July 1674
Augustus George Vernon Harcourt	1868-06-04	24 December 1834 – 23 August 1919
Simon Harcourt, 1st Earl Harcourt	1753-03-15	1714 – 16 September 1777
William George Granville Venables Vernon Harcourt	1881-12-15	14 October 1827 – 30 September 1904
William Venables Vernon Harcourt	1824-04-29	June 1789 – 1 April 1871
Arthur Harden	1909-05-06	12 October 1865 – 17 June 1940
Friedrich August von Hardenberg	1745-06-13	1700–1768
David Grahame Hardie	2007-05-17	
Roger Clayton Hardie	2010-05-20	
Karl Ludwig Harding	1806-04-17	? 29 September 1765 – 31 August 1834
Wyndham Harding	1852-06-03	9 August 1818 – ? 2 April 1855
Caleb Hardinge	1753-03-15	? 1757
George Hardinge	1788-04-03	22 June 1743 – 26 April 1816
John Hardwick	1838-04-05	3 December 1791 – 31 May 1875 Barrister
Philip Hardwick	1831-12-08	15 June 1792 – 28 December 1870
Thomas Hardwicke	1813-04-08	? 1755 – ? 3 May 1835
Alister Clavering Hardy	1940-03-14	11 February 1896 – 22 May 1985
Godfrey Harold Hardy	1910-05-05	8 February 1877 – 1 December 1947
John Hardy	2009-05-15	Geneticist
Peter Hardy	1839-01-17	17 December 1813 – 23 April 1863 Actuary
William Bate Hardy	1902-06-05	6 April 1864 – 23 January 1934
Francis George Hare	1812-12-10	12 January 1842
Henry Hare, 3rd Baron Coleraine	1730-01-08	10 May 1693 – 10 August 1749
John Scandrett Harford	1823-05-29	8 October 1785 – 16 April 1866
James Hargraves	1726-07-07	15 November 1741
Charles James Hargreave	1844-04-18	December 1820 – 23 April 1866
Charles Robert Harington	1931-05-07	1 August 1897 – 04
Harish-Chandra	1973-03-15	11 October 1923 – 16 October 1983
Alfred Harker	1902-06-05	20 February 1859 – 28 July 1939
John Allen Harker	1910-05-05	23 January 1870 – 10 October 1923 Chemist & Physicist
Robert Harkness	1856-06-05	28 July 1816 – ? 5 October 1878
Richard Harland	2019-04-16	
Sydney Cross Harland	1943-03-18	19 June 1891 – 8 November 1982
Edward Harley	1663-07-22	21 October 1624 – 8 December 1700
Edward Harley, 2nd Earl of Oxford and Mortimer	1727-11-23	2 June 1689 – 16 June 1741
George Harley	1865-06-01	13 February 1829 – 27 October 1896 Scottish Physician
John Laker Harley	1964-03-19	17 November 1911 – 13 December 1990 Prof. of Botany, Sheffield Inivesity
Robert Harley	1863-06-04	23 January 1828 – 26 July 1910 Clergyman & mathematician
Robert Harley, 1st Earl of Oxford and Mortimer	1712-03-20	5 December 1661 – 21 May 1724
Robert Harley	1661-08-14	6 April 1626 – 6 November 1673 Original Fellow, Soldier, MP for New Radnor
Thomas Harley	1667-05-30	c. 1685 Fellow of All Souls', Oxford
Sidney Frederic Harmer	1898-06-09	9 March 1862 – 22 October 1950
John Harper	1727-03-09	June 1735 Barrister
John Lander Harper	1978-03-16	
Samuel Harper	1766-04-24	fl 1766 Librarian, British Museum
Edward Harrington	1734-04-04	30 July 1757
William Harrington	1666-03-21	7 November 1671 Merchant, Commissioner of Customs
Daniel Harris	1768-03-24	1775 Mathematician, Christ's Hospital
Geoffrey Wingfield Harris	1953-03-19	4 June 1913 – 29 November 1971 Dept.of Neuroendocrinology, Inst.of Psychiatry, Maudsley Hospital, London
Harry Harris	1966-03-17	30 September 1919 – 17 July 1994 Geneticist
Henry Harris	1968-03-21	
James Harris	1763-06-23	20 July 1709 – 22 December 1780
John Harris	1696-04-29	c. 1666 – 7 September 1719
John Edward Harris	1956-03-15	15 September 1910 – 24 June 1968
John Edwin (Jack) Harris	1988-03-17	Editor, Interdisciplinary Science Review
John Greathed Harris	1835-02-05	c. 1774 – 25 October 1850
Samuel Harris	1722-11-01	9 December 1682 – 21 December 1733 Clergyman & Prof of History, Cambridge
Thomas Maxwell Harris	1948-03-18	8 January 1903 – 1 May 1983
William Anthony Harris	2007-05-17	
William Snow Harris	1831-06-02	1 April 1791 – 22 January 1867
Bryan Desmond Harrison	1987-03-19	
George Harrison	1807-02-05	3 February 1841 Assistant Secretary to the Treasury
Richard John Harrison	1973-03-15	8 October 1920 – 17 October 1999 Professor of Anatomy, University of Cambridge
Roy Michael Harrison	2017-05-05	14 October 1948 -
Thomas Harrison	1804-06-07	August 1771 – 21 March 1824 Barrister & mathematician
Thomas Charles Harrison	1845-05-08	c. 1793 – 2 May 1858 Head of a Treasury Department
William Harrison	1765-05-09	20 May 1728 – 24 April 1815 Scientific instrument maker
William Harrison	1815-05-11	fl 1815
Michael Hart	1982-03-18	Physicist, Brookhaven, NY
Brian Selby Hartley	1971-03-18	1926–
David Hartley	1736-03-25	? 1705 – 28 August 1757
Percival Hartley	1937-05-06	29 May 1881 – 16 February 1957
Harold Brewer Hartley	1926-05-06	3 September 1878 – 9 September 1972
Walter Noel Hartley	1884-06-12	4 February 1847 – 11 September 1913
George Harry Fleetwood Hartopp	1815-03-02	20 August 1785 – 31 March 1824
Douglas Rayner Hartree	1932-05-05	28 March 1897 – 12 February 1958
Hamilton Hartridge	1926-05-06	7 May 1886 – 13 January 1976
Eliab Harvey	1764-03-29	23 May 1716 – 23 October 1769 Barrister
George Harvey	1825-05-05	29 October 1834
Henry Harvey	1825-02-17	fl 1825–1837 Astronomer
Hildebrand Wolfe Harvey	1945-03-22	31 December 1887 – 26 November 1970
Paul H. Harvey	1992-03-12	
Richard Harvey	2016-04-29	Biologist
Robert John Harvey	1835-04-02	22 February 1785 – 18 June 1860
William Henry Harvey	1858-06-03	6 February 1811 – 15 May 1866
John Harwood	1686-11-03	1661 – 1 January 1731 Advocate
John Harwood	1827-05-24	c. 1794–1854 Prof of Natural History, London (poss. used name "Ian" as initial, given in 1827 paper, was "I")
Busick Harwood	1784-05-27	c. 1745 – 10 November 1814
Thomas Haselden	1740-01-17	May 1740
Demis Hassabis	2018-05-09	27 July 1976
Cedric Herbert Hassall	1985-03-21	
Michael Patrick Hassell	1987-03-19	
Richard Hassell	1726-05-12	16 March 1770
Edward Hasted	1766-05-08	20 December 1732 – 14 January 1812
Henry Hasted	1812-01-09	17 September 1771 – 26 November 1852
Nicholas Dixon Hastie	2002-05-09	
Francis Hastings, 10th Earl of Huntingdon	1758-03-02	13 March 1729 – 2 October 1789
Michael Harvey Hastings	2010-05-20	Microbiologist
Warren Hastings	1801-06-25	6 December 1732 – 22 August 1818
William Aitcheson Haswell	1897-06-03	5 August 1854 – 24 January 1925
Robert Neville Haszeldine	1968-03-21	
Marshall Davidson Hatch	1980-03-20	
Charles Hatchett	1797-03-09	2 January 1765 – ? 10 March 1847
William Herbert Hatfield	1935-05-16	10 April 1882 – 16 October 1943
Andrew Tym Hattersley	2010-05-02	
Christopher Hatton, 1st Baron Hatton	1663-05-20	? July 1605 – 4 July 1670 Original
George Finch-Hatton	1775-12-07	30 June 1747 – 17 February 1823
Ronald George Hatton	1944-03-16	6 July 1886 – 11 November 1965
Samuel Haughton	1858-06-03	21 December 1821 – 31 October 1897
Sidney Henry Haughton	1961-03-16	7 May 1888 – 24 May 1982
Graves Champney Haughton	1821-11-15	1788 – 28 August 1849
Francis Hauksbee	1705-11-30	c. 1666 – April 1713
Hermann Maria Hauser	2012-04-19	
Michael A. Hausser	2015-05-01	Neuroscientist
Jean de Hautefeuille	1687-12-14	20 March 1647 – 18 October 1724
Thomas Henry Havelock	1914-05-07	24 June 1877 – 1 August 1968
Clopton Havers	1686-11-17	25 February 1657 – April 1702
Craig Jon Hawker	2010-05-20	
Leonard Hawkes	1952-03-20	6 August 1891 – 29 October 1981
Christopher John Hawkesworth	2002-05-09	
Stephen William Hawking	1974-03-21	
Caesar Henry Hawkins	1856-06-05	19 September 1798 – 20 July 1884
Edward Hawkins	1821-05-24	5 May 1780 – 22 May 1867
Francis Bisset Hawkins	1834-12-18	18 October 1796 – 7 December 1894
Herbert Leader Hawkins	1937-05-06	1 June 1887 – 29 December 1968
John Hawkins	1826-01-12	fl 1826 East India Co engineer
John Hawkins	1791-05-05	6 May 1761 – 4 July 1841
John Heywood Hawkins	1830-06-10	21 May 1802 – 27 June 1877
Christopher Hawkins	1815-12-21	1758–1829
Phillip Hawkins	2013-05-02	
William Bentinck Letham Hawkins	1835-11-19	1802 – 31 August 1894
John Hawkshaw	1855-06-07	1811 – 2 June 1891
Thomas Hawksley	1878-06-06	12 July 1807 – 23 September 1893
James Hawley	1740-05-01	2 March 1706 – 22 December 1777 Physician
Lionel Haworth	1971-03-18	4 August 1912 – 12 April 2000
Robert Downs Haworth	1944-03-16	15 March 1898 – 21 May 1990
Walter Norman Haworth	1928-05-10	19 March 1883 – 19 March 1950
William Rede Hawthorne	1955-03-17	
Alexander Hay	1778-06-18	fl 1778 Physician
Allan Stuart Hay	1981-03-19	
Andrew Leith Hay	1834-12-18	18 February 1785 – 13 October 1862
Arthur Hay, 9th Marquess of Tweeddale	1871-06-08	9 November 1824 – 29 December 1878
George Hay, 8th Earl of Kinnoull	1712-03-20	28 July 1758
John Hay, 1st Marquess of Tweeddale	1664-02-03	c. 13 August 1626 – 11 August 1697
John Hay, 2nd Marquess of Tweeddale	1666-05-23	1645 – 20 April 1713
Robert William Hay	1814-03-03	c. 1787 – 9 May 1861
Ronald Thomas Hay	2010-05-20	
Adrian Hayday	2016-04-29	Biochemist
Henry Hubert Hayden	1915-05-06	25 July 1869 – 13 August 1923
Denis Arthur Haydon	1975-03-20	22 February 1930 – 29 November 1988
James Hayes	1663-05-20	1693 Original Prince Rupert Secretary
William Hayes	1964-03-19	18 January 1913 – 7 January 1994 geneticist, Australia
John Haygarth	1781-02-08	1740 – 10 June 1827
Walter Kurt Hayman	1956-03-15	
Edward Haynes	1683-05-02	fl 1683–1708
Peter Howard Haynes	2019-04-16	23 July 1958 –
Thomas Hayter	1750-03-22	? November 1702 – 9 January 1762
Robert Baldwin Hayward	1876-06-01	7 March 1829 – 2 February 1903
William Hayward	1665-05-17	c. 1617–1704 Commissioner
Richard Hazard	1752-06-04	21 September 1784
Alan Kenneth Head	1988-03-17	10 August 1925 – 9 January 2010 Australia
Edmund Walker Head	1863-04-16	17 February 1805 – 28 January 1868
Henry Head	1899-06-01	4 August 1861 – 8 October 1940
Martin Head-Gordon	2019-04-16	17 March 1962 –
Thomas Healde	1770-06-21	c. 1724 – 26 March 1789
Robert Brian Heap	1989-03-16	
Walter Heape	1906-05-03	25 April 1855 – 10 September 1929
Edith Heard	2013-05-02	
David Rodney Roger Heath-Brown	1993-03-11	
Benjamin Heath	1778-04-30	1817 Headmaster, Harrow
George Heath	1795-03-26	1845 – 1822 Headmaster of Eton
George Crawford Heath	1818-05-28	c. 1794 – 18 July 1860 Barrister
John Benjamin Heath	1843-02-02	6 June 1790 – 16 January 1879 Merchant
Oscar Victor Sayer Heath	1960-03-24	26 July 1903 – 16 June 1997 Botanist
Thomas Little Heath	1912-05-02	5 October 1861 – 16 March 1940
George Heathcote	1729-01-16	7 December 1700 – 7 June 1768
Gilbert Heathcote	1705-11-30	2 January 1652 – 25 January 1733
Henry Heathcote	1720-06-30	27 October 1727
John Heathcote	1768-05-12	29 July 1795
Thomas Heathcote	1751-05-16	23 July 1721 – 27 June 1787
John Heaviside	1797-12-14	1748 – 19 September 1828 Surgeon
Oliver Heaviside	1891-06-04	18 May 1850 – 03
Donald Olding Hebb	1966-03-17	22 July 1904 – 20 August 1985
Thomas Heberden	1761-12-10	1703–1769
William Heberden	1750-01-25	August 1710 – 17 May 1801
William Heberden	1791-02-24	23 March 1767 – 19 February 1845
James Hector	1866-06-07	16 March 1834 – 5 November 1907
Johann Hedwig	1788-04-03	8 December 1730 – 7 February 1799
Ramanujan Hegde	2016-04-29	Biochemist
Gabriele C. Hegerl	2017-05-05	
Ian Morris Heilbron	1931-05-07	6 November 1886 – 14 September 1959
Hans Arnold Heilbronn	1951-03-15	8 October 1908 – 28 April 1975
Volker Heine	1974-03-21	
Johann Theodor Heinson	1692-11-30	5 July 1666 – 22 September 1726
Lawrence Heister	1730-12-17	19 September 1683 – 18 April 1758
Walter Heinrich Heitler	1948-03-18	2 January 1904 – 15 November 1981
Henry Selby Hele-Shaw	1899-06-01	29 July 1854 – 30 January 1941
John Hellins	1796-12-22	? 1749 – 5 April 1827
Jean Hellot	1740-10-23	20 November 1685 – 15
Gustavus Helmfeld	1670-04-21	10 November 1651 – 27 March 1674
Jean Claude Adrian Helvetius	1755-04-24	18 July 1685 – 17 July 1755
Johan Anton Helvetius	1763-02-10	fl 1763
John Hely-Hutchinson	1794-03-06	1724 – 4 September 1794
Richard Hely-Hutchinson, 4th Earl of Donoughmore	1865-03-25	4 April 1823 – 22 February 1866
Janet Hemingway	2011-05-19	
Samuel Hemming	1776-06-20	1785
Brian Arthur Hemmings	2009-05-15	
Benjamin Arthur Hems	1969-03-20	29 June 1912 – 2 July 1995
William Botting Hemsley	1889-06-06	29 December 1843 – 7 October 1924
Humphrey Henchman	1665-03-29	? December 1592 – 7 October 1675
David Willis Wilson Henderson	1959-03-19	23 July 1903 – 16 August 1968
George Gerald Henderson	1916-05-11	30 January 1862 – 28 September 1942
George Hugh Henderson	1942-03-19	8 December 1892 – 19 June 1949
Gideon Henderson	2013-05-02	
James Henderson	1831-04-28	c. 1783 – 18 September 1848
Richard Henderson	1983-03-17	
William MacGregor Henderson	1976-03-18	17 July 1913 – 29 November 2000
Thomas Henderson	1840-04-09	28 December 1798 – 23 November 1844
Arthur Henfrey	1852-06-3	1 November 1819 – 7 September 1859 Botanist
John Henley	1693-11-30	fl 1693–1706 Customer, Bristol
William Henly	1773-05-20	fl 1773
Henry Hennell	1829-03-12	11 June 1842
John Baboneau Nickterlien Hennessey	1875-06-03	1 August 1829 – ? 23 March 1910
Henry Hennessy	1858-06-03	19 March 1826 – 8 March 1901
John Henniker, Baron Henniker	1779-11-11	15 June 1724 – 18 April 1803
John Henniker-Major, 2nd Baron Henniker	1785-12-15	19 April 1752 – 4 December 1821
Olaus Magnus Friedrich Erdmann Henrici	1874-06-04	9 March 1840 – 10 August 1918
Henry Henricksen	1743-02-10	1715–1780
Henry Frederick William, Duke of Cumberland and Strathearn	1789-01-26	27 October 1745 – 18 September 1790 Royal
Henry William Frederick Albert, Duke of Gloucester	1938-12-08	31 March 1900 – 10 June 1974 Royal
Thomas Henry	1775-05-18	? 26 October 1734 – 18 June 1816 Manchester Apothecary
Thomas Hetherington Henry	1846-04-23	c. 1816 – 9 October 1859
William Henry	1755-02-20	13 February 1768 Clergyman
William Henry	1809-02-23	12 December 1774 – 2 September 1836
William Charles Henry	1834-04-10	31 March 1804 – 7 January 1892
Nathaniel Henshaw	1663-05-20	1628 – c. September 1673 Original
Thomas Henshaw	1663-04-22	15 June 1618 – 2 January 1700 Original, soldier
John Henslow	1794-03-20	fl 1794 Surveyor of the Navy
William Jory Henwood	1840-02-27	16 January 1805 – 5 August 1875
William Bird Herapath	1859-06-09	29 February 1820 – 12 October 1868
Henry Herbert, 4th Earl of Carnarvon	1875-04-08	24 June 1831 – 28 June 1890
Henry Herbert, 3rd Earl of Carnarvon	1841-05-27	8 June 1800 – 9 December 1849
Henry Herbert, 9th Earl of Pembroke	1743-12-15	29 January 1693 – 9 January 1750
John Herbert	1677-12-13	c. 1647 – Virtuoso
Thomas Herbert, 8th Earl of Pembroke	1685-05-13	1656 – 22 January 1733, PRS 1689–1690
William Abbott Herdman	1892-06-02	8 September 1858 – 21 July 1924
Francois David Herissant	1750-11-01	29 September 1714 – 21 August 1771
Edward Heron-Allen	1919-05-15	17 December 1861 – 28 March 1943
Alexander Stewart Herschel	1884-06-12	6 February 1836 – 18 June 1907
John Herschel	1871-06-08	29 October 1837 – 31 May 1921 Surveyor
John Frederick William Herschel	1813-05-27	7 March 1792 – 11 May 1871
William Herschel	1781-12-06	15 November 1738 – 25 August 1822
Farrer Herschell, 1st Baron Herschell	1892-01-21	2 November 1837 – 1 March 1899
Frederick Augustus Hervey, 4th Earl of Bristol	1782-02-28	1 August 1730 – 8 July 1803
Frederick William Hervey, 5th Earl of Bristol	1805-05-23	3 June 1769 – 15 February 1859
John Hervey	1664-12-07	18 August 1616 – 18 January 1680
Ewald Friedrich Herzberg	1789-04-30	2 September 1725 – 22 May 1795
Gerhard Herzberg	1951-03-15	25 December 1904 – 3 March 1999
John Heslop-Harrison	1970-03-19	11 February 1920 – 7 May 1998
John William Heslop-Harrison	1928-05-10	22 January 1881 – 23 January 1967
Johann Heinrich Heucher	1729-11-06	1677 – 23 February 1747 Austrian Physician
Johann Christian Heusch	1680-01-29	fl 1680–1684
Johannes Hevelius	1664-03-30	28 January 1611 – 28 January 1687
Hewer Edgley Hewer	1723-06-27	c. 1692 – 6 November 1728
John Hewett	1786-05-25	fl 1786 Clergyman
Prescott Gardner Hewett	1874-06-04	3 July 1812 – 19 June 1891
Thomas Hewett	1721-11-02	9 September 1656 – 9 April 1726
Antony Hewish	1968-03-21	11 May 1924 – 13 September 2021
Eric John Hewitt	1982-03-18	28 February 1919 – 1 January 2002
Geoffrey Frederick Hewitt	1989-03-16	
John Theodore Hewitt	1910-05-05	12 October 1868 – 9 July 1954
William Hewson	1770-03-08	14 November 1739 – 1 May 1774
Donald Holroyde Hey	1955-03-17	12 September 1904 – 21 January 1987
James Stanley Hey	1978-03-16	4 May 1909 – 27 February 2000
William Hey	1775-03-30	23 August 1736 – 23 March 1819
Charles Thomas Heycock	1895-06-13	21 August 1858 – 3 June 1931
James Heygate	1843-04-06	1801 – ? 5 August 1872 Physician
Christian Gottlob Heyne	1789-04-30	25 September 1729 – 14 July 1812
James Heywood	1839-02-07	28 May 1810 – 17 October 1897 barrister and geologist.
Benjamin Heywood	1843-01-19	12 December 1793 – 11 August 1865
Urban Hiarne	1669-11-18	20 December 1641 – 22 March 1724 Swedish physician
George Hibbert	1811-05-30	1757 – 8 October 1837
John Hickes	1703-11-30	fl 1703–1717
Henry George Albert Hickling	1936-05-07	5 April 1883 – 26 July 1954
Nathan Hickman	1725-04-15	c. 1695–1746
Samuel Hickman	1745-03-07	17 August 1754
Henry Hicks	1885-06-04	26 May 1837 – 18 November 1899
John Braxton Hicks	1862-06-05	24 February 1823 – 28 August 1897
William Mitchinson Hicks	1885-06-04	23 September 1850 – 17 August 1934
Ian David Hickson	2010-05-20	Oncologist
Sydney John Hickson	1895-06-13	26 June 1859 – 6 February 1940
Raymond Hide	1971-03-18	
William Philip Hiern	1903-06-11	19 January 1839 – 29 November 1929
John Higginbottom	1852-06-03	14 June 1788 – 7 April 1876
Dame Julia Stretton Higgins	1995-03-09	
William Higgins	1806-06-12	? 1762 – 30 June 1825
Douglas Roland Higgs	2005-05-26	Haematologist
Peter Ware Higgs	1983-03-17	
Nicholas Higham	2007-05-17	
David Hight	2016-04-29	Geotechnical engineer
Graham Higman	1958-03-20	
John Philips Higman	1820-03-23	1793 – 7 August 1855
Thomas Percy Hilditch	1942-03-19	22 April 1886 – 9 August 1965
Abraham Hill	1660-11-28	18 April 1633 – 5 February 1721 Founder Fellow
Archibald Vivian Hill	1918-05-02	26 September 1886 – 3 June 1977
Arthur Hill, 2nd Marquess of Downshire	1790-01-21	1753 – 7 September 1801
Arthur William Hill	1920-05-13	11 October 1875 – 3 November 1941
Austin Bradford Hill	1954-03-18	8 July 1897 – 18 April 1991
David Keynes Hill	1972-03-16	23 July 1915 – 18 August 2002
Dorothy Hill	1965-03-18	10 September 1907 – 23 April 1997
Allen Hill	1990-03-15	
James Hill	1719-04-09	8 February 1696 – ? January 1728 Barrister, Antiquary
James Peter Hill	1913-05-01	22 February 1873 – 24 May 1954
John Hill	1748-12-08	2 July 1753
John MacGregor Hill	1981-03-19	21 February 1921–14 January 2008
Leonard Erskine Hill	1900-06-14	28 January 1858 – 30 March 1952
Maurice Neville Hill	1962-03-15	29 May 1919 – 11 January 1966
Micaiah John Muller Hill	1894-06-07	23 February 1856 – 11 January 1929
Oliver Hill	1677-11-08	c. 1630–? Religious pamphleteer
Robert Hill	1946-03-21	2 April 1899 – 15 March 1991 aka Robin Hill
Rodney Hill	1961-03-16	11 June 1921 – 2 February 2011
Rowland Hill	1857-06-11	3 December 1795 – 27 August 1879
Samuel Hill	1711-11-30	1648 – 7 March 1716 Clergyman
Thomas Hill	1725-04-15	c. 1683 – 20 September 1758 Poet
William George Hill	1985-03-21	
Wills Hill, 1st Marquess of Downshire	1764-03-08	30 May 1718 – 7 October 1793
Edward Hilliard	1802-12-23	18 December 1816
Edwin Sherbon Hills	1954-03-18	31 August 1906 – 1 May 1986
Philip Hills	1799-04-18	fl 1799
Richard Edwin Hills	2014-04-30	1945–
Cyril Hilsum	1979-03-15	
John Hilton	1839-01-10	1804 – 14 September 1878
Nicolaus de Himsel	1760-11-27	October 1729 – 10 December 1764
Harold Percival Himsworth	1955-03-17	19 May 1905 – 3 November 1993
Edward John Hinch	1997-05-15	
Thomas Hincks	1872-06-06	15 July 1818 – 25 January 1899
John Russell Hind	1863-06-04	12 May 1823 – 23 December 1895
George Jennings Hinde	1896-06-04	24 March 1839 – 18 March 1918
Robert Aubrey Hinde	1974-03-21	
Edward Hindle	1942-03-19	21 March 1886 – 22 January 1973
Edward Hinds	2004-05-27	
Arthur Robert Hinks	1913-05-01	26 May 1873 – 18 April 1945
Cyril Norman Hinshelwood	1929-05-02	19 June 1897 – 9 October 1967
Christopher Hinton, Baron Hinton of Bankside	1954-03-18	12 May 1901 – 22 June 1983
Geoffrey Everest Hinton	1998-05-14	
Howard Everest Hinton	1961-03-16	24 August 1912 – 2 August 1977
Martin Alister Campbell Hinton	1934-05-03	29 June 1883 – 3 October 1961
John Hippisley	1855-06-07	29 October 1804 – 4 April 1898 Astronomer
John Cox Hippisley	1800-06-12	1748 – 3 May 1825
Hirohito, Emperor of Japan	1971-05-13	29 April 1901 – 7 January 1989 Statute
Kei Hirose	2023-05-10	
Peter Bernhard Hirsch	1963-03-21	
Edmund Langley Hirst	1934-05-03	21 July 1898 – 29 October 1975
John Malcolm Hirst	1970-03-19	20 April 1921 – 30 December 1997
Judy Hirst	2018-05-09	
Thomas Archer Hirst	1861-06-06	23 April 1830 – 16 February 1892
William Hirst	1755-02-20	? December 1769 Astronomer
Nigel James Hitchin	1991-03-14	
Benjamin Hoadly	1727-03-09	11 February 1706 – 10 August 1757 Physician
Cecil Arthur Hoare	1950-03-16	6 March 1892 – 23 August 1984 Parasitologist
Charles Hoare	1809-12-21	25 August 1767 – 16 November 1851 Banker
Charles Antony Richard Hoare	1982-03-18	
Henry Hugh Hoare	1784-06-17	28 February 1762 – c. 1842
James Hoare	1664-11-02	c. 1620 – 30 November 1696 Goldsmith (the elder)
James Hoare	1669-01-21	1642 – ? August 1679 Goldsmith (the younger)
Joseph Hoare	1753-05-24	1802
Richard Hoare	1752-05-07	2 March 1709 – 12 October 1754 Lord Mayor of London, 1745
Richard Colt Hoare	1792-04-26	9 December 1758 – 19 May 1838
William Hoare	1663-05-20	1666 Original, Physician
John Hobart, 2nd Earl of Buckinghamshire	1785-02-03	17 August 1723 – 3 September 1793
John Cam Hobhouse, Baron Broughton de Gyfford	1814-05-19	27 June 1786 – 3 June 1869
Benjamin Hobhouse	1798-12-13	1757 – 14 August 1831
Robert Hoblyn	1745-06-13	? May 1710 – 17 November 1756
Thomas Hoblyn	1811-06-27	1778 – 6 August 1860
Ernest William Hobson	1893-06-01	27 October 1856 – ? 18 April 1933
William Vallance Douglas Hodge	1938-03-17	17 June 1903 – 7 July 1975
Joseph Hodges	1716-04-05	c. 1704 – 1 April 1722
Thomas Hodges	1715-06-09	fl 1715–1720 Attorney-General of Barbados
Alan Lloyd Hodgkin	1948-03-18	6 February 1914 – 20 December 1998
Dorothy Mary Crowfoot Hodgkin	1947-03-20	12 May 1910 – 29 July 1994
Jonathan Alan Hodgkin	1990-03-15	
Eaton Hodgkinson	1841-02-18	27 February 1789 – 18 June 1861
Robert Banks Hodgkinson	1778-04-30	? 1721 – 11 November 1792
Brian Houghton Hodgson	1877-06-07	2 February 1800 – 23 May 1894
James Hodgson	1703-11-30	1672 – 25 June 1755 Schoolmaster, Royal School of Mathematics
Joseph Hodgson	1831-04-14	1789 – 7 February 1869
Robert Hodgson	1810-07-05	fl 1810
William Hodgson	1807-04-23	24 November 1824 Collector
Edward Hody	1733-03-08	1698 – 1 November 1759
Tycho Hoffman	1746-05-29	16 December 1714 – 14 February 1754
Friedrich Hoffmann	1720-11-30	20 February 1660 – 12 November 1742
August Wilhelm von Hofmann	1851-06-05	8 April 1818 – ? 5 May 1892
Brigid L. M. Hogan	2001-05-10	
Lancelot Thomas Hogben	1936-05-07	9 December 1895 – 22 August 1975
John Hogg	1839-06-20	21 March 1800 – 16 September 1869
Quintin McGarel Hogg, Baron Hailsham of St Marylebone	1973-06-14	9 October 1907 – 12 October 2001 Statute 12
Henry Hoghton	1765-06-13	22 October 1728 – 9 March 1795
David William Holden	2004-05-27	
Henry Capel Lofft Holden	1895-06-13	23 January 1856 – 30 March 1937
Douglas William Holder	1962-03-15	14 April 1923 – 18 April 1977
William Holder	1663-05-20	1616 – 24 January 1698 Original
Peter Holford	1747-02-12	c. 1719 – 14 July 1804
Robert Holford	1805-03-28	c. 1758 – 14 August 1838
Stayner Holford	1785-05-12	23 March 1790
Charles Holland	1837-01-19	1802 – 21 March 1876 Physician
Henry Holland	1815-01-19	27 October 1788 – 27 October 1873
Peter William Harold Holland	2003-05-15	
Richard Holland	1726-11-30	1688 – 29 October 1730 Physician
Thomas Henry Holland	1904-05-05	22 November 1868 – 15 May 1947
Timothy Holland	2014-04-30	Petrologist, Cambridge University
Frescheville Holles	1672-01-18	8 June 1642 – 28 May 1672
John Holliday	1786-03-09	c. 1730 – 9 March 1801 Barrister
Robin Holliday	1976-03-18	6 November 1931 – 9 April 2014 Molecular biologist
John Hollier	1718-12-11	c. 1687 – c. 1722
Thomas Hollingbery	1783-01-23	1 August 1792
John Hollings	1727-03-09	c. 1683 – 10 May 1739
Thomas Hollis	1757-06-30	14 April 1720 – 1 January 1774
Thomas Brand Hollis	1756-06-03	September 1804
Samuel Christian Hollman	1747-05-21	3 December 1696 – 4 September 1787
Benjamin Holloway	1723-11-30	c. 1691 – 10 April 1759
John Ernest Holloway	1937-05-06	13 February 1881 – 6 September 1945
James Holman	1826-02-02	15 October 1786 – ? 29 July 1857
George Holme-Sumner	1796-11-17	10 November 1760 – 1831
Andrew Bruce Holmes	2000-05-11	
Arthur Holmes	1942-03-19	14 January 1890 – 20 September 1965
Edward C. Holmes	2017-05-05	
George Holmes	1741-11-12	1663 – 16 February 1749
Gordon Morgan Holmes	1933-05-11	22 February 1876 – 29 December 1965
Kenneth Charles Holmes	1981-03-19	
Robert Holmes	1797-12-14	? November 1748 – 12 November 1805
George Augustus Frederick Charles Holroyd, 2nd Earl of Sheffield	1860-06-21	16 March 1802 – 5 April 1876
John Baker Holroyd, 1st Earl of Sheffield	1783-04-03	1735 – 30 May 1821
Ronald Holroyd	1960-03-24	26 April 1904 – 29 September 1973
John Louis Holstein	1762-07-01	1694–1763 Danish Minister of State
Christine Elizabeth Holt	2009-05-15	
John Riley Holt	1964-03-19	
Rowland Holt	1707-03-12	c. 1652 – 11
John Zephaniah Holwell	1767-01-29	17 September 1711 – 5 November 1798
Everard Home	1787-02-15	6 May 1756 – 31 August 1832
James Everard Home	1825-04-21	25 October 1798 – 2 November 1853
Ernest Demetrios Hondros	1984-03-15	
Robert William Kerr Honeycombe	1981-03-19	
Charles Hood	1843-12-07	1805 – 10 December 1889
James Hook	1816-02-29	c. 1772 – 5 February 1828 Clergyman
Walter Farquhar Hook	1862-06-05	13 March 1798 – 20 October 1875
Robert Hooke	1663-05-20	18 July 1635 – 3 March 1703 Original
Joseph Dalton Hooker	1847-04-22	30 June 1817 – 10 December 1911
Stanley George Hooker	1962-03-15	30 September 1907 – 24 May 1984
William Jackson Hooker	1812-01-09	6 July 1785 – 12 August 1865
Christopher Hooley	1983-03-17	
Edward Hooper	1759-05-31	1795 Commissioner of Customs
Hendrik Hop	1734-10-24	8 December 1686 – 8 December 1761
Charles Hope-Weir	1744-04-26	8 May 1710 – 30 December 1791
Frederick William Hope	1834-06-05	3 January 1797 – 15 April 1862
James Hope	1832-06-09	24 February 1801 – 12 May 1841 Surgeon
John Hope	1767-02-12	10 May 1725 – 10 November 1786
John Hope, 2nd Earl of Hopetoun	1728-02-08	7 September 1704 – 26 February 1781
Thomas Hope	1804-12-06	30 August 1769 – 3 February 1831
Thomas Charles Hope	1810-05-31	21 July 1766 – 13 June 1844
William Johnstone Hope	1808-03-24	16 August 1766 – 2 May 1831
Andrew Hopkins	2023-05-10	1971/1972-
Daniel Hopkins	1765-06-27	4 September 1791
Frederick Gowland Hopkins	1905-05-11	20 June 1861 – 16 May 1947
Harold Horace Hopkins	1973-03-15	6 December 1918 – 22 October 1994
William Hopkins	1837-06-01	3 February 1793 – 13 October 1866
Bertram Hopkinson	1910-05-05	11 January 1874 – 26 August 1918
John Hopkinson	1878-06-06	27 July 1849 – 27 August 1898
Andy Hopper	2006-05-18	
John Hoppus	1841-05-20	1789 – 29 January 1875
Richard Cope Hopton	1771-12-12	c. 1738 – 13 January 1810
David Alan Hopwood	1979-03-15	
John Harold Horlock	1976-03-18	
Gabriel Horn	1986-03-20	9 December 1927 – 2 August 2012
James Horne	1742-05-20	fl 1742
James Horne	1834-02-06	1790 – 26 October 1856 Glassmaker
John Horne	1900-06-14	1 January 1848 – 30 May 1928
Michael Rex Horne	1981-03-19	29 December 1921 – 6 January 2000
Anthony Horneck	1669-01-28	1641 – 31 January 1697
Leonard Horner	1813-11-11	17 January 1785 – 5 March 1864
Thomas Hornsby	1763-04-21	28 August 1733 – 11 April 1810
George Adrian Horridge	1969-03-20	
Ian Horrocks	2011-05-19	
James Horsburgh	1806-03-13	23 September 1762 – 14 May 1836
Stephen Horseman	1728-02-15	fl 1702–1737
James Horsfall	1768-04-14	25 April 1785
Thomas Horsfield	1828-01-10	12 May 1773 – 24 July 1859
John Horsley	1729-05-08	1685 – 12 January 1732
Samuel Horsley	1767-04-09	15 September 1733 – 4 October 1806
Victor Alexander Haden Horsley	1886-06-04	14 April 1857 – 16 July 1916
Frank Horton	1923-05-03	20 August 1878 – 31 August 1957 Physicist, Royal Holloway
Peter Horton	2010-05-20	Biochemist
David Hosack	1816-05-23	31 August 1769 – 22 December 1835
Brian John Hoskins	1988-03-17	
Samuel Elliott Hoskins	1843-05-25	
John Hoskins	1663-05-20	23 July 1634 – 12 September 1705 Original
Charles Hotham	1668-01-09	13 May 1615 – ? February 1674 Rector, Bermuda
Pieter Hotton	1703-01-01	18 June 1648 – 10 January 1709
James Hough	2003-05-15	
Sydney Samuel Hough	1902-06-05	11 June 1870 – 8 July 1923
John Houghton	1680-01-29	1645–1705 Apothecary
John Theodore Houghton	1972-03-16	
Richard Houlston	2017-05-05	
Godfrey Newbold Hounsfield	1975-03-20	28 August 1919 – 12 August 2004
Robert Houston	1725-12-09	? December 1678 – 15 May 1734 Physician
Alexander Cruikshank Houston	1931-05-07	18 September 1865 – 29 October 1933
Alisdair Iain Houston	2012-04-19	
William Houstoun	1733-01-18	c. 1695 – 14 August 1733
Bernard Edward Howard, 12th Duke of Norfolk	1816-02-15	21 November 1765 – ? 16 March 1842
Charles Howard	1663-05-20	13 September 1630 – 31 March 1713 Original
Charles Howard, 10th Duke of Norfolk	1768-03-24	1 December 1720 – 31 August 1786
Charles Howard, 11th Duke of Norfolk	1767-06-18	5 March 1746 – 16 December 1815
Charles Howard, 1st Earl of Carlisle	1665-06-14	5 February 1629 – 24 February 1685
Edward Howard	1668-11-05	fl 1668–1706 Barrister
Edward Charles Howard	1799-01-17	28 May 1774 – 27 September 1816
George William Frederick Howard, 7th Earl of Carlisle	1847-06-03	18 April 1802 – 5 December 1864
George Howard, 6th Earl of Carlisle	1795-02-26	17 September 1773 – 7 October 1848
Henry Charles Howard, 13th Duke of Norfolk	1842-12-15	12 August 1791 – 18
Henry Howard, 6th Duke of Norfolk	1666-11-28	12 July 1628 – 11 January 1684
Henry Howard, 7th Duke of Norfolk	1672-10-30	11 January 1655 – 2 April 1701
Hugh Howard	1696-11-30	8 February 1675 – 17 March 1737
James Griffiths Howard	1984-03-15	25 September 1927 – 6 October 1998
John Howard	1756-05-13	2 September 1726 – 20 January 1790
John Eliot Howard	1874-06-04	11 December 1807 – 22 November 1883
John Stafford Howard	1673-11-06	October 1714
Jonathan Charles Howard	1995-03-09	
Judith Ann Kathleen Howard	2002-05-09	
Lord Thomas Howard	1672-11-06	c. 1655 – 9 November 1689 Courtier, Diplomat
Luke Howard	1821-03-08	28 November 1772 – 21 March 1864
Samuel Howard	1771-03-14	c. 1731 – ? 31 December 1811 Surgeon
William Augustus Howard	1778-05-14	20 October 1800
William Howard, 1st Viscount Stafford	1665-01-18	? 30 November 1612 – 29 December 1680
Leslie Howarth	1950-03-16	23 May 1911 – 22 September 2001
Thomas Bayly Howell	1804-03-08	1768 – 13 April 1815
Thomas George Bond Howes	1897-06-03	7 September 1853 – 4 February 1905 Professor of Zoology
Archibald Howie	1978-03-16	
William Howley	1796-11-17	13 February 1766 – 11 February 1848
Henry Hoyle Howorth	1893-06-01	1 July 1842 – 15 July 1923
Thomas Hoy	1707-12-01	12 December 1659 – c. 1718
Fred Hoyle	1957-03-21	24 June 1915 – 20 August 2001
Johann Jacob Huber	1752-05-07	11 September 1707 – 6 July 1778
Martin Hubner	1755-03-20	fl 1755
Richard Huck-Saunders	1768-02-18	1720 – 24 July 1785
Robert Hucks	1722-11-01	21 December 1745
Joseph Huddart	1791-11-17	11 January 1741 – 19 August 1816
Wilfred Hudleston Hudleston	1884-06-12	2 June 1828 – 29 January 1909
Charles Grave Hudson	1757-05-19	3 April 1730 – 24 October 1813
Charles Thomas Hudson	1889-06-06	11 March 1828 – 23 October 1903
John Hudson	1754-12-05	October 1772 Physician
Peter John Hudson	2008-05-16	
Robert Hudson	1834-04-10	1801 – 9 February 1883
Robert Francis Hudson	1982-03-18	15 December 1922 – 19 August 2012 Organic chemist
Robert George Spencer Hudson	1961-03-16	17 November 1895 – 29 December 1965
William Hudson	1964-03-19	27 April 1896 – 12 September 1978
William Hudson	1761-11-05	c. 1730 – 23 May 1793
Arthur St George Joseph McCarthy Huggett	1958-03-20	23 April 1897 – 21 July 1968 Physiologist
William Huggins	1865-06-01	8 February 1824 – 12 May 1910
David Edward Hughes	1880-06-03	16 May 1831 – 22 January 1900
Edward Hughes	1727-03-09	c. 1701 – 13 January 1734 MP for Saltash
Edward David Hughes	1949-03-17	18 June 1906 – 30 June 1963
Griffith Hughes	1748-06-09	fl 1748–1758
John Hughes	1993-03-11	neuroscientist
Thomas McKenny Hughes	1889-06-06	17 December 1832 – 9 June 1917
Nevin Campbell Hughes-Jones	1985-03-21	
Johann August Hugo	1717-11-14	11 September 1686 – 16 February 1753
Simon Antoine Jean L'Huilier	1791-05-05	24 April 1750 – 28 March 1840
John Whitaker Hulke	1867-06-06	7 November 1830 – 19 February 1895
Christopher Michael Hull	2012-04-19	
Derek Hull	1989-03-16	
Edward Hull	1867-06-06	21 May 1829 – 18 October 1917 Geologist
Nathaniel Hulme	1794-07-03	17 June 1732 – 28 March 1807
Alexander, Baron Hume-Campbell	1773-04-01	30 July 1750 – 9 March 1781 Governor, Bank of Scotland
William Hume-Rothery	1937-05-06	15 May 1899 – 27 September 1968
Joseph Hume	1818-01-08	23 January 1777 – 20 February 1855
Abraham Hume	1775-12-14	21 February 1749 – 24 March 1838 Fellow 1775-12-14
John Herbert Humphrey	1963-03-21	16 December 1915 – 25 December 1987
Sir Colin John Humphreys	2011-05-19	
David Humphreys	1807-06-11	11 July 1752 – 21 February 1818
George Murray Humphry	1859-06-09	18 July 1820 – 24 September 1896 Surgeon, Cambridge University
Francis Joseph Hunauld	1734-02-14	25 February 1701 – 15 December 1742 Anatomist Royal Garden, Paris
Karl Friedrich Hundertmark	1755-03-13	11 April 1715 – 8 May 1762
George Hunt	1819-11-11	1790 – 20 February 1861 Clergyman
John David Hunt	2001-05-10	
Julian Charles Roland Hunt, Baron Hunt	1989-03-16	
Robert Hunt	1854-06-01	6 September 1807 – 17 October 1887
Richard Timothy Hunt	1991-03-14	
Thomas Hunt	1740-11-13	1696 – 31 October 1774
Thomas Hunt	1725-04-15	? 1731 Captain, 1st Dragoon Guards
Thomas Sterry Hunt	1859-06-09	6 September 1826 – 12 February 1892
William Le Hunt	1668-02-13	fl 1668–1682
Alexander Hunter	1775-02-02	1729 – 17 May 1809
Anthony Rex Hunter	1987-03-19	
Christopher Alexander Hunter	2008-05-16	
Christopher Neil Hunter	2009-05-15	
John Hunter	1767-02-05	14 February 1728 – 16 October 1793 The surgeon
John Hunter	1786-01-12	? February 1754 – 29 January 1809 A physician
Peter John Hunter	2006-05-18	
Robert Hunter	1709-05-04	31 March 1734
Robert Hunter	1837-04-06	? 1866
William Hunter	1767-04-30	23 May 1718 – 30 March 1783
George Isaac Huntingford	1804-02-23	9 September 1748 – 29 April 1832
Herbert Eric Huppert	1987-03-19	
Matthew Hurles	2019-04-16	
Joseph Hurlock	1782-03-14	c. 1715 – 15 August 1793
Philip Hurlock	1780-11-16	c. 1713–1803
Laurence Daniel Hurst	2015-05-01	1965 – Geneticist
Noel Sydney Hush	1988-03-17	
Thomas Hussey	1792-03-08	1741 – 11 July 1803
James Devereux Hustler	1819-11-18	5 November 1850
Archibald Hutcheson	1708-11-30	c. 1660 – 12 August 1740
Graham John Hutchings	2009-05-15	
Andrew Hutchinson	1804-04-26	1826 Physician
Arthur Hutchinson	1922-05-11	6 July 1866 – 12 December 1937 Mineralogist
Benjamin Hutchinson	1795-03-19	March 1804
George Henry Hutchinson	1829-03-19	28 August 1852
John Hutchinson	1947-03-20	7 April 1884 – 2 September 1972 Botanist
Jonathan Hutchinson	1882-06-08	23 July 1828 – 26 June 1913
Joseph Burtt Hutchinson	1951-03-15	21 March 1902 – 16 January 1988
Alexander Copland Hutchison	1828-03-13	3 January 1840
William Kenneth Hutchison	1966-03-17	30 October 1903 – 28 November 1989
Jeremy Mark Hutson	2010-05-20	
Addison Hutton	1738-02-09	30 March 1742
Charles Hutton	1774-06-16	14 August 1737 – 27 January 1823
Frederick Hutton	1892-06-02	16 November 1836 – 27 October 1905
John Hutton	1697-11-30	1712 Physician
William Hutton	1840-06-04	? 21 March 1797 – ? 21 November 1860
John Huxham	1739-04-05	1692 – 11 August 1768
John Corham Huxham	1769-03-16	fl 1769
Hugh Esmor Huxley	1960-03-24	22 February 1924 – 25 July 2013
Andrew Fielding Huxley	1955-03-17	22 November 1917 – 30 May 2012 Prof. of Physiology
Julian Sorell Huxley	1938-03-17	22 June 1887 – 14 February 1975
Thomas Henry Huxley	1851-06-05	4 May 1825 – 29 June 1895
Christian Huyghens	1663-06-22	14 April 1629 – ? 8 June 1695 Original
Edward Hyde, 1st Earl of Clarendon	1665-02-08	19 February 1609 – 9 December 1674
Henry Hyde, 2nd Earl of Clarendon	1684-12-01	3 June 1638 – 31 October 1709
John Hyde	1752-05-28	15 February 1771
Benjamin Hyett	1796-06-02	c. 1741 – ? 21 June 1810
William Henry Hyett	1844-02-29	2 September 1795 – 10 March 1877
Anthony Arie Hyman	2007-05-17	Molecular Cell Biologist
John Hymers	1838-05-31	20 July 1803 – 7 April 1887
Richard Hynes	1989-03-16	

=== I ===
Name	Election date	Notes
Levett Landon Boscawen Ibbetson	1850-06-06	? – 8 September 1869
Ainsley Iggo	1978-03-16	2 August 1924 – 25 March 2012 Prof. of Veterinary Physiology
Vincent Charles Illing	1945-03-22	24 September 1890 – 16 May 1969 Prof. of Oil Tech., Imperial Coll.
Augustus Daniel Imms	1929-05-02	24 August 1880 – 3 April 1949
Harry Raymond Ing	1951-03-15	31 July 1899 – 23 September 1974 Pharmacologist
John Ingenhousz	1769-05-25	8 December 1730 – 7 September 1799
Albert Edward Ingham	1945-03-22	3 April 1900 – 6 September 1967
Philip William Ingham	2002-05-09	
John Ingilby	1793-02-07	9 May 1758 – 13 May 1815
Edward Augustus Inglefield	1853-06-02	27 March 1820 – 5 September 1894
John Inglis	1713-01-22	8 May 1740 Physician
Charles Edward Inglis	1930-05-15	31 July 1875 – 19 April 1952 Prof. of Engineering, Cambridge University
Claude Cavendish Inglis	1953-03-19	3 March 1883 – 29 August 1974 Director, Hydraulic Research Station
Robert Harry Inglis	1813-03-04	12 January 1786 – 5 May 1855
Keith Usherwood Ingold	1979-03-15	
Christopher Kelk Ingold	1924-05-15	28 October 1893 – 8 December 1970
Vernon Martin Ingram	1970-03-19	19 May 1924 – 17 August 2006
Sue Ion	2016-04-29	3 February 1955 –
Joshua Iremonger	1747-04-30	c. 1716 – 31 December 1804
Robin Francis Irvine	1993-03-11	
James Colquhoun Irvine	1918-05-02	9 May 1877 – 12 June 1952
Edward A. Irving	1979-03-15	27 May 1927 – 25 February 2014 Geologist
Malcolm Irving	2003-05-15	
Alick Isaacs	1966-03-17	17 July 1921 – 26 January 1967, virologist, interferon
Peter Gershon Isaacson	2009-05-15	
David Ish-Horowicz	2002-05-09	
Justinian Isham	1663-07-01	20 January 1611 – 2 March 1675
Werner Israel	1986-03-20	German-born Canadian physicist, cosmologist
Jacob Nissim Israelachvili	1988-03-17	19 August 1944 – 20 September 2018
Charles Issac	1692-11-30	fl 1692–1711
Alec Arnold Constantine Issigonis	1967-03-16	18 November 1906 – 2 October 1988
George Isted	1801-04-16	3 November 1821
Thomas Isted	1698-11-09	9 December 1677 – 9 October 1731
Andre Jarowiewitch Italinski	1814-06-16	15 May 1743 – 27 June 1827
Leslie Lars Iversen	1980-03-20	
Jeremiah Ives	1819-12-16	c. 1777 – 14 September 1829
John Ives	1773-03-25	1751 – 9 June 1776
James Ivory	1815-04-06	17 February 1765 – 21 September 1842

== Foreign members ==
=== G ===
Name	Election date	Notes
Antonio García-Bellido	1986-06-26	
Herbert Spencer Gasser	1946-05-09	5 July 1888 – 11 May 1963, medicine, Nobel Prize (1944)
Jean Albert Gaudry	1895-12-12	? 16 September 1827 – 27 November 1908
Joseph Louis Gay-Lussac	1815-04-06	6 December 1778 – 9 May 1850
Gerard Jakob De Geer	1930-06-26	2 October 1858 – ? 23 July 1943
Carl Gegenbaur	1884-01-31	21 August 1826 – 14 June 1903
Walter Jakob Gehring	1997-05-15	20 March 1939 – 29 May 2014, Swiss developmental biologist
Izrael Moiseivich Gelfand	1977-04-21	Ukrainian-born Russian-American mathematician
Murray Gell-Mann	1978-04-20	15 September 1929 – 24 May 2019, U.S. physicist, Nobel Prize (1969)
Pierre-Gilles de Gennes	1984-06-28	24 October 1932 – 18 May 2007
Reinhard Genzel	2012-04-19	
Fabiola Gianotti	2018-05-09	29 October 1960 –
Josiah Willard Gibbs	1897-03-04	12 February 1839 – 28 April 1903
Grove Karl Gilbert	1918-02-28	6 May 1843 – 1 May 1918
Walter Gilbert	1987-06-25	U.S. chemist, Nobel Prize (1980)
Henry Gilman	1975-04-24	9 May 1893 – 7 November 1986, U.S. organometallic chemist
Vitaly Lazarevich Ginzburg	1987-06-25	Russian physicist, Nobel Prize (2003)
Roy J. Glauber	1997-05-15	U.S. physicist, Nobel Prize (2005)
Salome Gluecksohn-Waelsch	1995-03-09	German-born U.S. geneticist, co-founder of developmental genetics
Kurt Gödel	1968-04-25	28 April 1906 – 14 January 1978
Karl Immanuel Eberhard Ritter von Goebel	1926-04-29	8 March 1855 – ? 9 October 1932
Peter Martin Goldreich	2004-05-27	U.S. astrophysicist
Victor Moritz Goldschmidt	1943-05-20	27 January 1888 – 20 March 1947, Swiss-born U.S. chemist, founder of modern geochemistry
Joseph L. Goldstein	1991-06-20	U.S. biologist, Nobel Prize (1985)
Boris Borisovich Golitsyn	1916-03-23	? 18 February 1862 – ? 17 May 1916
Michael Frank Goodchild	2010-05-20	24 February 1944 –
John Bannister Goodenough	2010-05-20	
Benjamin Apthorp Gould	1891-11-26	27 September 1824 – 26 November 1896
Ragnar Arthur Granit	1960-04-28	30 October 1900 – 12 March 1991
Asa Gray	1873-11-27	? 8 November 1810 – 30 January 1888
Harry Barkus Gray	2000-05-11	
Mikhail Leonidovich Gromov	2011-05-19	Mathematician
Paul Heinrich Ritter von Groth	1911-11-09	23 June 1843 – 2 December 1927
Robert H. Grubbs	2017-05-05	27 February 1942 – 19 December 2021

=== H ===
Names	Election date	Notes
Jacques Hadamard	1932-06-02	8 December 1865 – 17 October 1963
Erwin L. Hahn	2000-05-11	
Otto Hahn	1957-05-09	8 March 1879 – 28 July 1968
Wilhelm Karl Ritter von Haidinger	1856-11-20	5 February 1796 – 19 March 1871
George Ellery Hale	1909-03-25	29 June 1868 – ? 23 February 1938
Albin Haller	1921-05-05	7 March 1849 – 1 May 1925
Joachim August Wilhelm Hammerling	1970-04-23	9 March 1901 – 5 August 1980
Peter Andreas Hansen	1835-06-04	8 December 1795 – 28 March 1874
Ilkka Aulis Hanski	2005-05-26	
Christopher Hansteen	1839-05-30	26 September 1784 – ? 11 April 1873
Ross Granville Harrison	1940-05-23	13 January 1870 – 30 September 1959
Stephen C. Harrison	2014-04-30	
Haldan Keffer Hartline	1966-04-21	22 December 1903 – 17 March 1983
René Just Haüy	1818-03-12	29 February 1743 – ? 3 June 1822 Foreign Member
John Hayes	2016-04-29	Earth scientist
Michael Heidelberger	1975-04-24	29 April 1888 – 15 June 1991
Rudolph Peter Heinrich Heidenhain	1897-03-04	29 January 1834 – 13 October 1897
Albert Heim	1896-11-26	12 April 1849 – ? 31 August 1937
Werner Karl Heisenberg	1955-04-28	5 December 1901 – 01
Friedrich Robert Helmert	1908-06-04	31 July 1843 – 15 June 1917
Hermann Ludwig Ferdinand von Helmholtz	1860-05-24	31 August 1821 – 8 September 1894
Friedrich Gustav Jakob Henle	1873-11-27	19 July 1809 – 13 May 1885
Karl Ewald Konstantin Hering	1902-11-27	5 August 1834 – 26 January 1918
Ludimar Hermann	1905-03-11	21 October 1838 – 5 June 1914
Charles Hermite	1873-11-27	24 December 1822 – 14 January 1901
George Charles de Hevesy	1939-05-11	1 August 1885 – 5 July 1966, Hungarian-born Swedish chemist, Nobel Prize (1943)
Jaroslav Heyrovský	1965-04-08	20 December 1890 – 27 March 1967
David Hilbert	1928-06-21	24 January 1862 – ? 23 February 1943 Foreign Member
Abraham Hill	1660-11-28	19 April 1633 – 5 February 1721 Founder Fellow
George William Hill	1902-11-27	3 March 1838 – 16 April 1914
Friedrich Ernst Peter Hirzebruch	1994-06-09	7 October 1927 – 27 May 2012
George Herbert Hitchings	1974-04-25	18 April 1905–27
Johan Hjort	1916-03-23	19 February 1869 – 7 October 1948 Foreign Member
Jacobus Henricus van 't Hoff	1897-11-25	30 August 1852 – 1 March 1911
Roald Hoffmann	1984-06-28	
Albrecht Hofmann	2018-05-09	1939
Barbara Leonare Hohn	2008-05-16	
John Holdren	2009-05-15	
Olaf Holtedahl	1961-04-27	24 June 1885 – 26 August 1975
Howard Robert Horvitz	2009-05-16	
Sven Otto Horstadius	1952-05-01	18 February 1898 – 16 June 1996
Hideo Hosono	2017-05-05	
Bernardo Alberto Houssay	1943-05-20	10 April 1887 – 21 September 1971
David Hunter Hubel	1982-06-24	
Robert Huber	1999-05-13	
Erich Armand Arthur Joseph Huckel	1977-04-21	10 August 1896 – 16 February 1980
Thomas J.R. Hughes	2011	
Hendrik Christoffel van de Hulst	1991-06-20	19 November 1918 – 31 July 2000
Friedrich Wilhelm Heinrich Alexander von Humboldt	1815-04-06	14 September 1769 – 6 May 1859
George Evelyn Hutchinson	1983-06-30	30 January 1903 – 17 May 1991
John W. Hutchinson	2013-05-02	

=== I ===
Name	Election date	Notes
George Rankine Irwin	1987-06-25	26 February 1907 – 6 October 1998
Masao Ito	1992-06-18	
