= Robert Hudson =

Robert or Bob Hudson may refer to:

- Robert Hudson, 1st Viscount Hudson (1886–1957), British politician and son of Robert William Hudson
- Robert Hudson (actor) (born 1960), British actor
- Robert Hudson (broadcaster) (1920–2010), British broadcaster on cricket, rugby and state occasions
- Robert Hudson (company), defunct British manufacturer and supplier of railway rolling stock and equipment
- Robert Hudson (FRS) (1801–1883), English naturalist
- Robert Hudson (novelist) (born 1973), British novelist and comedy writer
- Robert Hudson (producer) (born 1960), American documentary filmmaker and Academy Award winner
- Robert George Spencer Hudson (1895–1965), British geologist and paleontologist
- Robert A. Hudson (1887–1974), American business executive and golf enthusiast
- Robert H. Hudson (1938–2024), American artist
- Robert James Hudson (1885–1963), Governor of Southern Rhodesia
- Robert Spear Hudson (1812–1884), popularised dry soap powder
- Robert William Hudson (1856–1937), soap manufacturer and son of Robert Spear Hudson
- Bob Hudson (offensive lineman) (1930–2018), American football player
- Bob Hudson (running back) (born 1948), American football player
- Bob Hudson (singer) (born 1946), Australian singer and radio presenter

== See also ==
- Rob Hudson (born 1955), Australian politician
- Robert B. Mantell (1854–1928), Scottish-born actor, sometimes used the acting name Robert Hudson
