= James Hill (antiquary) =

English barrister and antiquary

James Hill (died 1727) was an English barrister and antiquary.

== Life ==
A native of Herefordshire, Hill was called to the bar as a member of the Middle Temple.

In 1718 Hill became a member of the Society of Antiquaries of London, and a Fellow of the Royal Society 30 April 1719. At a meeting of the Society of Antiquaries on 3 January 1722 it was decided to attempt a complete history of British coins. Hill undertook to describe the Saxon coins in the Earl of Oxford's possession, while his own collection was to be catalogued by George Holmes. The plan was not carried through.

A few years before his death Hill moved permanently to Herefordshire. He still corresponded with other antiquaries, especially Roger Gale and William Stukeley. A collection of thirty-five ancient Herefordshire deeds, most of them marked with Hill's name, was given by Joshua Blew, librarian of the Inner Temple and from Herefordshire, to Andrew Coltée Ducarel.

== Legacy ==
At his dying request, Hill's father showed his Herefordshire collections to Samuel Gale in March 1728, who thought they couldn't be published. In 1752 Isaac Taylor of Ross bought the papers of Hill's brother, a schoolmaster in Herefordshire, for John Roberts, M.B., also of Ross, who indexed them and made additions. After Roberts's death in 1776 the collection, now about twenty volumes, passed back to Taylor, who sold them in 1778 to Thomas Clarke, F.S.A., principal registrar of the diocese of Hereford. On Clarke's death in March 1780 they came to the Rev. James Clarke. Clarke offered to sell them to John Allen the younger of Hereford, but they could not agree on a price. Via other hands and Belmont Priory, the papers came to Hereford City Library.

Hill also wrote verse. Isaac Taylor had soliloquy of Hill's "on hearing a parent correct his child with curses". A more ambitious poem was mentioned by Maurice Johnson, junior, in a letter to Stukeley, dated 14 October 1719. Verses on Hill's death are in John Husband's Miscellany of Poems (pp. 134–40), Oxford, 1731, implying that Hill wrote some lines on "Eternity" about ten hours before his death.

== Works ==
Between 1715 and 1717 Hill issued proposals for publishing by subscription a history of the city of Hereford. He proposed to follow this by another volume, a county history. The plan was printed in Richard Rawlinson's English Topographer,’ 1720, pp. 71–3. Nothing came of the project.

Hill showed the Society of Antiquaries in 1718 many drawings and plans from travels in the west of England that summer. One of his drawings, a west view and ichnography of Tintern Abbey, Monmouthshire, was engraved by J. Harris for John Stevens's History of Antient Abbeys, 1723. In 1722 he exhibited to the Society surveys of Ariconium and Hereford.

== Notes ==
Attribution

This article incorporates text from a publication now in the public domain: Stephen, Leslie; Lee, Sidney, eds. (1891). "Hill, James (d.1728?)". Dictionary of National Biography. Vol. 26. London: Smith, Elder & Co.
