= Andrew Hopkins =

Welsh scientist (born 1971/1972)

Andrew Lee Hopkins CBE FRS FMedSci FRSE (born 1971) is a Welsh scientist who is the founder and former CEO of the pharmaceutical company Exscientia, which develops drugs using artificial intelligence.

He was educated at Dwr-y-Felin Comprehensive School and Neath College in South Wales. He holds a first-class degree in chemistry from the University of Manchester, and a DPhil in biophysics from the University of Oxford. He worked for Pfizer for a decade, then became a professor at the University of Dundee in 2007, where Exscientia was founded in July 2012 as a spinout.

Hopkins is married to scientist Iva Hopkins Navratilova.

He was elected a Fellow of the Royal Society of Edinburgh in 2016. He was elected a Fellow of the Royal Society and Fellow of the Academy of Medical Sciences in May 2023. Hopkins was appointed Commander of the Order of the British Empire (CBE) in the 2024 New Year Honours for services to science and to innovation.

In February 2024, Hopkins was dismissed as CEO of Exscientia, with the company citing his inappropriate relationships with two employees in a press release.

In late 2024 Hopkins founded a new biotechnology company, Xyme, focussing on enzyme design across several sectors of industrial and life science business.
