= Henry Hennessy =

Irish physicist and inventor (1826–1901)

Henry Joseph Hennessy (19 March 1826–8 March 1901) was an Irish physicist and Fellow of the Royal Society.

== Life ==
Born at Cork, Ireland on 19 March 1826, he was the second son of John Hennessy of Ballyhennessy, County Kerry, and his wife Elizabeth, daughter of Henry Casey of Cork; John Pope Hennessy was a younger brother of Henry's. Educated at Cork under Michael Healy, he as a Roman Catholic in the 1840s did not seek a university education, but took up the profession of an engineer.

In 1849 Hennessy was made librarian of Queen's College, Cork, and in 1855, on the invitation of John Henry Newman, he became professor of physics at Catholic University of Ireland. In 1874 he transferred his services to the Royal College of Science, Dublin, where he was appointed professor of applied mathematics. He was dean of the college in 1880 and again in 1888. Hennessy was made a member of the Royal Irish Academy in 1851, and was its vice-president from 1870 to 1873. He was also elected Fellow of the Royal Society in 1858.

In 1890 Hennessy resigned his chair at 65, under the new rules for superannuation in the Civil Service. A memorial to the government protesting against his retirement was without effect. For financial reasons he went abroad, but returning to Ireland under medical advice, he died on 8 March 1901, at Bray, County Wicklow.

== Works ==
In Hennessy's first paper from 1845, in the Philosophical Magazine, he proposed to use photography for the registration of barometric and thermometric readings. In Researches in Terrestrial Physics (Philosophical Transactions, 1851) he argued from the figure and structure of the Earth and planets, that they were of fluid origin, and that a fluid nucleus at a high temperature was enclosed within their crust. He also wrote on meteorology and on climatology, deducing laws which regulate the distribution of temperature in islands. 'On the Influence of the Gulf Stream led to a request to report on the temperature of the seas surrounding the British Isles for the Committee on Irish Fisheries in 1870.

Among Hennessy's other proposals was one for a decimal system of weights and measures, based on the length of the polar axis of the Earth, rather than the Earth's quadrant, on which the metric system is based. Standards such as the polar foot and the polar pound, and a complete set of weights and measures on the polar system, constructed under Hennessy's supervision, were stored in the Museum of the Royal College of Science, Dublin. In the same museum were models of his mechanical inventions, one of them illustrating the structure of sewers best adapted to obtain the greatest scour with due provision for storm water He published also:

- On the Study of Science in its Relation to Individuals and Society, Dublin, 1858; 2nd edit. 1859.
- On the Freedom of Education (a paper at the Social Science Congress, Liverpool, in 1858), 1859.
- The Relation of Science to Modern Civilisation, 1862.

== Family ==
Hennessy married Rosa Corri (1836-1926), youngest daughter of Hayden Corri. They had one daughter, Mary Rosa Hennessy (later Dashwood,1873–1949).
