= Samuel Howard (surgeon) =

English surgeon (1731–1811)

Samuel Howard (1731 – 21 December 1811) was an English surgeon and Fellow of the Royal Society.

== Life ==
Howard qualified as surgeon, with diploma from Surgeons' Hall, after a year of training at St George's Hospital. He was in practice in Covent Garden, and was surgeon to the London Lock Hospital. He became house surgeon to the Middlesex Hospital in 1758.

Howard was elected a Fellow of the Royal Society in 1771. In 1797 he became surgeon to the Prince of Wales, on the death of Richard Grindall.

Howard died in Yattendon, Berkshire, on 21 December 1811 at the age of 80.
