= John Allen (bookseller) =

English bookseller and antiquary (1789–1829)

John Allen (1789–1829) was an English bookseller and antiquary, notable for his work on the history of Herefordshire.

Allen was the son of a Hereford man, who as far back as 1775 was the leading bookseller in the county. Besides attending to an extensive printing and new-book trade, the younger Allen took an active part in local affairs, and brought together the remarkable collection of antiquities, books, manuscripts, maps, and prints relating to Herefordshire, described in his Bibliotheca. A history of the county, with which he had made some progress, has never been published. He retired to London about six or seven years before his death, which occurred in 1831.

His printed works are:

1. A Translation of the Charter granted to the City of Hereford by King William III, 14 June 1697 [by J. A.], 1820
2. Bibliotheca Herefordiensis, or a descriptive catalogue of books, pamphlets, maps, prints, &c., relating to the county of Hereford, 1821. Only twenty-five copies printed on writing-paper and one on vellum, for private distribution, were issued of this work. The titles in this very complete bibliography are supplied in almost every instance from the books themselves. It is arranged under seventeen headings, with an introductory chapter on some of the best known manuscript collections.
3. The Proceedings in Herefordshire connected with the Visit of Joseph Hume, M.P. … with an appendix of documents [ed. by J. A.], 1822
4. Collectanea Herefordensia 1825

== See also ==
- Book trade in the United Kingdom
