= Raymond Michael Gaze =

British neuroscientist

- Born: 22 June 1927
- Died: 11 September 2012 (aged 85)
- Awards: Physiological Society Annual Review Prize Lecture (1977)
- Scientific career
- Fields: Neuroscience, Electrophysiology

Raymond Michael ‘Mike’ Gaze FRS (22 June 1927—11 September 2012) was a British neuroscientist.

He was the first person to use electrophysiological recording techniques to examine the formation, development and regeneration of the nervous system. He worked mainly on the visual system of frogs and fish. He established that nerve connexions are plastic, that is that during normal development retinal fibres continually change the connexions they make with the brain.

Gaze was deputy director of The National Institute for Medical Research (the forerunner to the Francis Crick Institute) from 1977 to 1983. In 1986 he was made an Honorary Professor at the University of Edinburgh, where he had served within the physiology department at different stages of his career. He was elected Fellow of the Royal Society of Edinburgh in 1964, of the Royal Society (London) in 1972.

He served as Editor for the journal Development from 1976 to 1988.

== Early life and education ==
Mike Gaze was born in England but moved with his family to Scotland when he was twelve years old. He had very little schooling and was educated mainly by private tutors at home. When sixteen years old he was admitted to study medicine at the Edinburgh College of Surgeons. After qualifying in medicine he was admitted in 1949 to Balliol College, Oxford, to study physiology. He started research for his doctorate in 1950 under the supervision of George Gordon. After gaining his doctorate in 1953 he spent two years compulsory military service as a physician.

== Personal life ==
In 1957 Gaze married Robinetta (Robin) Mary Armfelt. Harriet was born in 1958 and Hannah and Julian were born in 1959. Gaze enjoyed family life, hill walking and playing the flute. He started to write a book on the ownership of land in Scotland after he retired but developed dementia and was not able to finish it. He was looked after at home by Robin until this was no longer possible. He died aged 85 years.

== Scientific career ==
On finishing military service in 1955, Gaze was appointed to a lectureship in physiology at the University of Edinburgh. He became Reader in Physiology in 1966. In 1970 Sir Peter Medawar invited Gaze to become director of a new division in developmental biology at The National Institute for Medical Research in London. Gaze accepted the invitation. He returned to Edinburgh in 1984 and led a Medical Research Council unit on neural development and regeneration. In 1992 he retired, continuing to live in Edinburgh.

=== Neural plasticity and systems matching ===
Gaze began his post-doctoral research by repeating the experiments of Roger Sperry. The experiments involved cutting the optic nerve in frogs, rotating the eye, and allowing the nerve to grow back. Vision was restored. Sperry showed that the frogs behaved as though they saw the world upside down through the rotated eye. Whereas Sperry had had to assume the anatomy from the frogs’ behaviour Gaze used electrophysiological recording to directly examine the precise anatomy – the exact pattern of functional connexions between the retina (eye) and the tectum (the visual part of the frog brain with which the retinal fibres connect). This was the first time that electrophysiological techniques had been used to examine nerve regeneration. These initial results showed that Sperry had been correct in his anatomical assumptions.

On the basis of his experiments, Sperry proposed the chemoaffinity theory (what he then called the theory of neuronal specificity). Sperry proposed that every retinal fibre has a unique chemical label and every part of the tectum has a unique label. According to Sperry’s theory there is a rigid rule (the mapping rule) that determines the connexions made: each retinal fibre label can connect with one, and only one, tectal label. A central feature of the theory is that there is no interaction between retinal fibres themselves in forming the pattern of connexions.

In a number of experiments Gaze and his colleagues showed that Sperry’s mapping rule could not account for all the results. The first such experiment was published in 1963. György Székely had developed a method of creating ‘compound’ eyes at embryological stages in frogs. Such eyes were made from putting together two half-eyes from two different eyes. For example a compound eye might be the result of fusing two front (nasal) half-eyes. Gaze and his colleagues showed that the retinal fibres from each half eye covered the whole of the tectum (rather than being limited to the half tectum that normally received fibres from the nasal half eye). Gaze and his colleagues went on to explore the pattern of regenerated connexions between retina and tectum after removal of part of the retina, or part of the tectum, or part of both retina and tectum. In all cases, in time, the whole of whatever remained of the retina connected in order with the whole of whatever remained of the tectum.

Gaze went on to explore the growth of retina and tectum during normal development. He showed that the retina grows concentrically; the tectum grows linearly. During this period of growth the retinal fibres form functional connexions with the tectum and the frog can see. Gaze showed that the connexions between the eye and the brain must be forming and breaking, and then new connexions made, in a continual process. In other words, during development the retinal fibres are constantly ‘sliding’, making and breaking functional connexions with the tectum. In 1972 ‘this idea was quite revolutionary’. Despite this ‘plasticity’ the projection from eye to brain was always ordered: adjacent parts of the retina connected with adjacent parts of the tectum. The ‘mapping rule’ appeared to be less rigid than that envisaged by Sperry: not cell-to-cell but system-to-system. To describe this process Gaze used the term ‘systems matching’.

The visual fields through the two eyes in frogs overlap to some extent. That is, frogs have binocular vision. The retinal fibres from the left eye connect with cells in the right tectum (and vice versa). The nerve impulse is then passed on to further cells in the tectum. Some of these further cells connect with specific points in the other tectum. Thus there are parts of the tectum that receive a nerve impulse directly from the opposite (contralateral) eye, and an impulse indirectly from the other (ipsilateral) eye. In the normal animal both these impulses are stimulated by an object in the same part of the visual field. Gaze and his colleagues observed that in animals with one compound eye the ipsilateral projection through the normal eye was frequently abnormal. Gaze’s student, and long-term collaborator, Mike Keating, suggested a possible theory to account for these findings. He proposed that the connexions from one tectum to the other were not the result of processes such as chemoaffinity or systems matching. Instead the connexions are formed by linking those nerves with similar spatiotemporal excitation patterns: what he called the functional hypothesis. Gaze and colleagues tested this hypothesis in a variety of situations and found that it accounted for all the results. Although Hebb had proposed that functional interaction is crucial in learning, and Hubel and Wiesel had shown that it plays a role in the preservation of binocular vision in cats, it had not previously been realised that functional interaction is important in the formation of precise nerve connexions. The degree of binocular overlap of the visual fields in frogs changes as the frog develops and the eyes move further apart. This results in the connexions between the tecta, that are determined by the functional hypothesis, changing. These connexions, like those of the connexions between the eye and its contralateral tectum, are ‘sliding’ during normal development.
