= William Man Godschall =

English dairy farmer

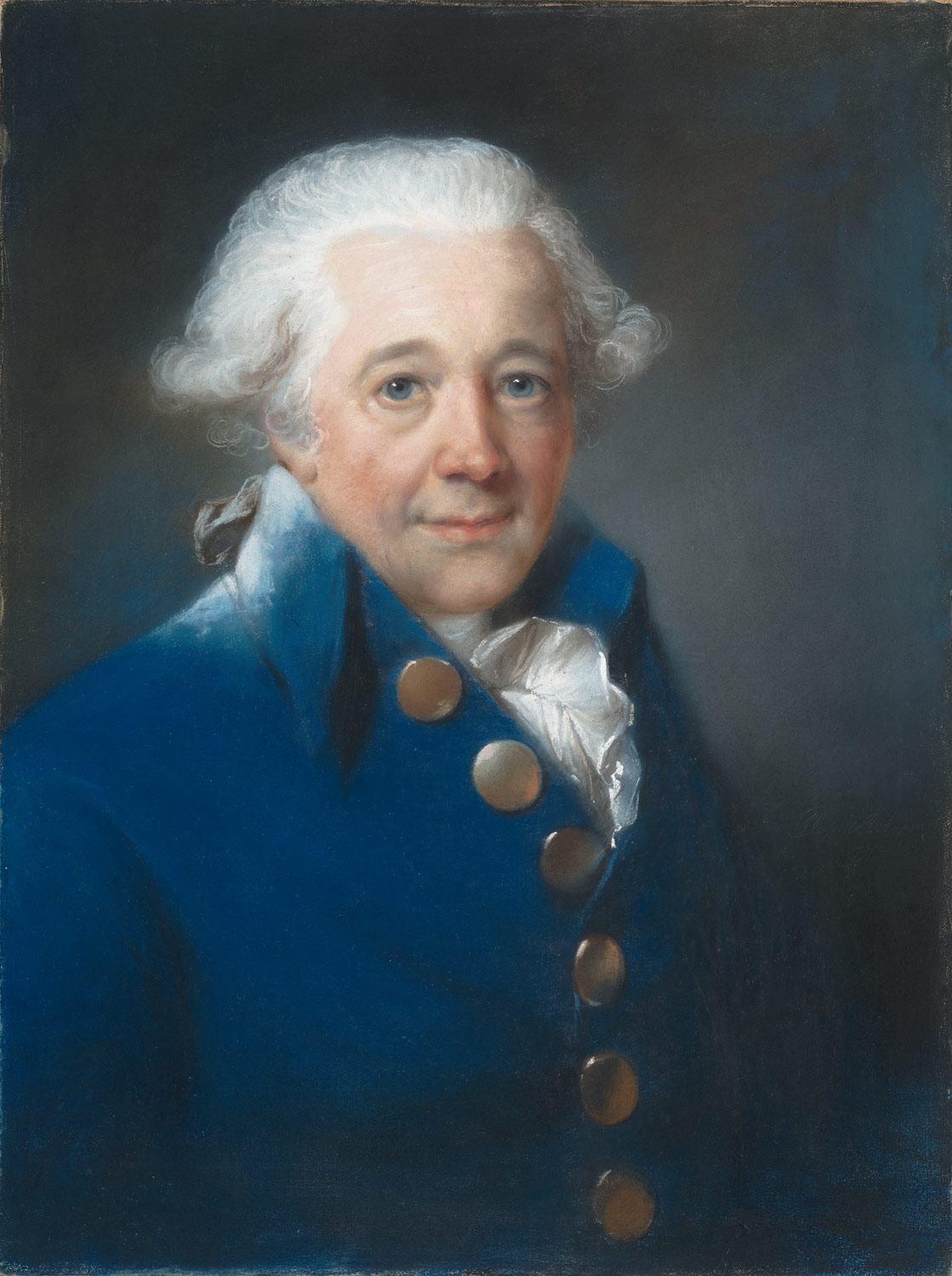
William Man Godschall, 1791 pastel portrait by John Russell

William Man Godschall (1720–1802) was an English dairy farmer and Fellow of the Royal Society (elected 1758).

== Life ==
He was initially called William Man, taking the surname Godschall in 1752, on his marriage. With his wife Sarah's fortune came the manor of Weston, land around the village now named Albury, Surrey, but at the time still called Weston Gomshall. There the couple lived, at Weston House.

Godschall was a Fellow of the Royal Society and Society of Antiquaries of London, and a member of the Society of Arts. He had a degree of LL.D.

In 1777 Godschall and Samuel Horsley compiled a catalogue of the papers of Isaac Newton kept at Hurstbourne Park, the family seat of the Earls of Portsmouth. In 1781 a collection of 220 letters of Edward Hyde, 1st Earl of Clarendon was given to the University of Oxford by Godschall, through John Douglas.

== Works ==
Godschall published A General Plan of Parochial and Provincial Police in 1787. He was helped with this work by Samuel Glasse. The mid-1780s in England had seen a crime wave, an increase in drunkenness, and other indications of social stress. A proclamation had been issued on 1 June 1787, which was reprinted by Godschall and in a related book by Glasse. The work in particular attacked "the swarm of alehouses that infest all our towns". It proposed the importance of the instruction of the young, emphasised also at this time by Sarah Trimmer, and the removal of children from unsuitable parents, at age "certainly not later than ten".

== Family ==
He was a son of William and Mary (Malcher) Man of Clapham and London, whose daughter Elizabeth married Benjamin Mee and was grandmother to the future prime minister Lord Palmerston.

William Man married the heiress Sarah Godschall, daughter of Nicholas Godschall, and niece of Sir Robert Godschall, Lord Mayor of London. Their surviving son was the Rev. Samuel Man Godschall (1764–1821), who was a college contemporary of Robert Malthus, and married his sister Anne Catherine Lucy Malthus. His wife sold Weston Gomshall manor and Weston House in 1822 to Henry Drummond; and died in 1823, leaving her estate to Edward Bray (died 1866), son of Edward Bray who had married Mary Ann Catherine Malthus in 1790.

Another son, William John Man Godscall, was a graduate of Christ Church, Oxford and barrister of the Inner Temple; he died unmarried before his father, on 26 December 1798.
