= George Holmes (archivist) =

English archivist

George Holmes (1662–1749) was an English archivist, best known as the editor of Thomas Rymer's Fœdera.

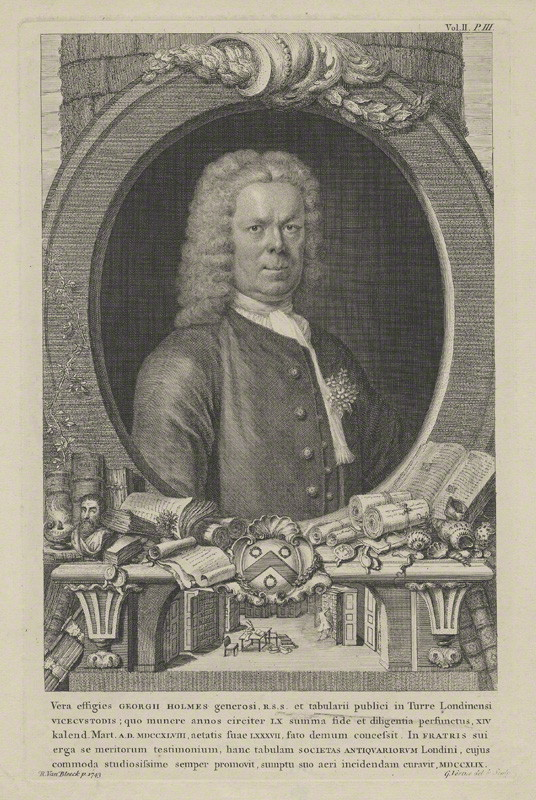
George Holmes

== Life ==
Born in 1662 at Skipton-in-Craven, Yorkshire, Holmes became, in about 1695, clerk to Sir William Petyt, Keeper of the Records in the Tower of London. For nearly sixty years he acted as deputy to Petyt, and his successors Richard Topham and David Polhill. He was also barrack-master at the Tower, a Fellow of the Royal Society, an early member of the Society of Antiquaries of London, and a member of the Gentlemen's Society at Spalding.

Thomas Madox worked closely with Holmes on his edition of the Dialogus de Scaccario; and Browne Willis, D'Blossiers Tovey, William Richardson, and other antiquaries acknowledged his assistance. From October 1707 until his death he was employed, on the nomination of Lord Halifax, chairman of committees in the House of Commons, to arrange the records deposited in the Tower, at a salary of £200. He died 16 February 1749, and his collection of books, prints, and coins was sold that year by Abraham Langford.

== Works ==
Holmes prepared the initial 17 volumes of the second edition of Rymer's Fœdera, (20 vols., London 1727–35). He collated the documents with the originals in the Tower of London, and supplied omissions in the first edition. The additions made by Holmes are considered to be of a higher quality than those by Robert Sanderson, Rymer's earlier editor. The final three volumes were the same for both editions. Volume 17 of the second edition had a general index to the preceding volumes.

A project of Peter Le Neve from the early 1720s to catalogue old British coins involved Holmes with James Hill. The ambitions to make a complete numismatic history fell through.

== Family ==
Holmes married the daughter of a sword-cutler in Fleet Street named Marshall. His wife, who survived him, received £200 from the government and £200 for her husband's manuscripts relating to the public records, which were deposited among the official documents at the Tower of London. Their only son, George, received his education at Eton College, and was clerk under his father; he died at the age of 25.

== Notes ==
Attribution

This article incorporates text from a publication now in the public domain: Lee, Sidney, ed. (1891). "Holmes, George (1662-1749)". Dictionary of National Biography. Vol. 27. London: Smith, Elder & Co.
