= Geoffrey Wilson Greenwood =

British materials scientist

Geoffrey Wilson Greenwood FREng FRS (3 February 1929—13 December 2022) was a British materials scientist who specialised in physical metallurgy.

Born in Low Moor, West Yorkshire, England, Geoffrey Greenwood was drawn to physics in school, and went on to study as an undergraduate in the subject at Sheffield University—an institution he would be affiliated with throughout his life, including a tenure as Head of the Department of Metallurgy and later Pro-Vice-Chancellor. His interests turned to physical metallurgy in his postgraduate years—his PhD thesis was entitled ‘A study of some factors affecting the cleavage of metals’.

Following his studies at Sheffield, Greenwood joined the Atomic Energy Research Establishment (AERE) at Harwell, Oxfordshire, where his metallurgy experience was put to use in the design of nuclear reactors. Following this, he led research into nuclear fuels and their containment for the Central Electricity Generating Board (CEGB) in England and Wales; helped to establish the Berkeley Nuclear Laboratories in Gloucestershire; and was appointed Science Research Manager for the newly established Electricity Council Research Centre at Capenhurst, Cheshire.

His work led to interactions and roles with a range of organisations, including the Institute of Materials, Minerals and Mining; the Institute of Physics; Sheffield Metallurgical and Engineering Association; Banaras Hindu University; and the Department of Materials Engineering at Zhejiang University. He was elected Fellow of the Royal Society in 1992.
