= Samuel Glasse =

Church of England clergyman

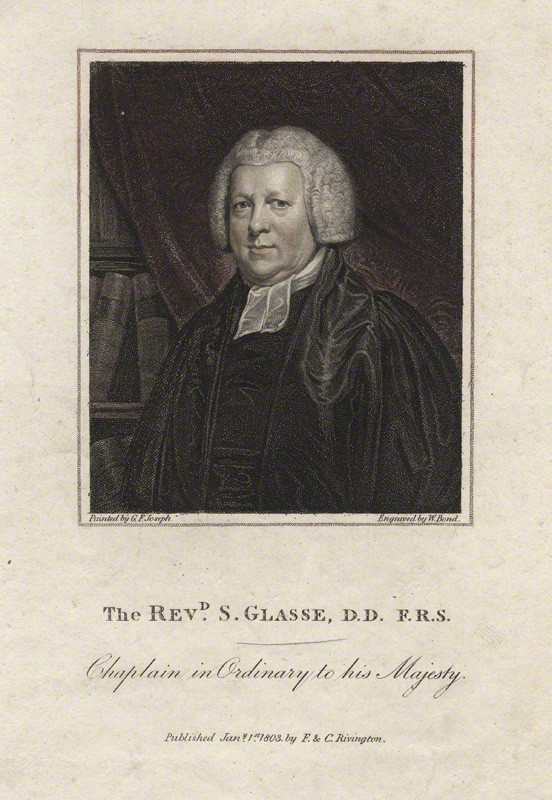
Samuel Glasse

Samuel Glasse D.D. (1735–1812) was an English cleric and fellow of the Royal Society. He was of High Church views, in the circle of William Jones of Nayland, a Hutchinsonian, and a loyalist of the unrest in the 1790s.

== Life ==
The son of the Rev. Richard Glasse (or Glass) of Purton, Wiltshire, and his wife Elizabeth, he was a scholar of Westminster School from 1749 to 1752. He was elected a junior student of Christ Church, Oxford on 4 June 1752, proceeded B.A. in 1756, M.A. in 1759, and accumulated the degrees of B.D. and D.D. on 7 December.

Glasse's first preferment was the rectory of St. Mary's, Hanwell, Middlesex, in 1780; to that point he had been chaplain to Margaret Coke, Countess of Leicester, and a schoolmaster at Greenford in Middlesex from 1768. He resigned Hanwell in favour of his son, George Henry Glasse, in 1785. The church was rebuilt during his residency, and he contributed largely towards the new edifice. In 1782 he became vicar of Epsom, Surrey, and four years later rector of Wanstead, Essex. He was appointed to the prebend of Shalford in Wells Cathedral in 1791, which he retained until 1798, when he was installed as prebendary of Oxgate in St Paul's Cathedral.

In 1764 Glasse became a fellow of the Royal Society, and in 1772 chaplain in ordinary to George III. Besides William Jones of Nayland, he knew George Horne among the High Church group, who was a close friend. He died in his home at 10 Sackville Street, London, on 27 April 1812, aged 78.

== Works ==
Glasse was active in the last quarter of the 18th century with sermons for charities. A Justice of the Peace he published in 1787 A Narrative of Proceedings tending towards a National Reforming previous to, and consequent upon, his Majesty's Royal Proclamation for the Suppression of Vice and Immorality. In a Letter to a Friend, &c. by a Country Magistrate, London, 1787; and assisted William Man Godschall in the pamphlet A General Plan of Parochial and Provincial Police of the same year. The Piety, Wisdom, and Policy of promoting Sunday Schools, London, 1786, and an article in the Gentleman's Magazine of January 1788, were ways in which Glasse supported the work of Robert Raikes. In 1797, he published A Course of Lectures on the Holy Festivals; with Practical Remarks on Each, and Exhortations to a More Devout and Solemn Observance of Them.

In 1777 Glasse translated and edited a French work by Louis-Antoine Caraccioli, as Address from a Lady of Quality to her Children in the Last Stage of a Lingering Illness, Gloucester, 1778, 2 vols.

== Notes ==
Attribution

This article incorporates text from a publication now in the public domain: Stephen, Leslie, ed. (1890). "Glasse, Samuel". Dictionary of National Biography. Vol. 21. London: Smith, Elder & Co.
