= William MacGregor Henderson =

William MacGregor Henderson FRS, FRSE, MRCVS
- Born: 17 July 1913; Edinburgh
- Died: 29 November 2000 (aged 87)
- Citizenship: Scottish
- Education: Royal (Dick) Veterinary College,
- Known for: President of the Zoological Society of London
- Scientific career
- Fields: Veterinary science
- Workplaces: Animal Virus Research Institute

Sir William MacGregor Henderson FRS FRSE MRCVS (17 July 1913 – 29 November 2000) was a Scottish veterinary expert on foot and mouth disease. He was also President of the Zoological Society of London, 1984–1989. He was in charge of controlling foot and mouth disease in South America from 1957 to 1966. In his life he was generally called Gregor Henderson.

== Life ==
Henderson was born in Edinburgh, the son of William Simpson Henderson and his wife, Catherine Alice Marcus Berry. His father was managing director of the company which printed bank-notes for the Royal Bank of Scotland. They lived at 123 Dalkeith Road in the south of the city. He was educated at George Watson's College in Edinburgh.

He studied at the Royal (Dick) Veterinary College in Edinburgh. During his career at the Animal Virus Research Institute at Pirbright, which he joined in 1939, Henderson developed an improved foot and mouth vaccine and developed a method of determining the virus content in a sample of infected material, which became known as the Henderson Method. He obtained his DSc from the University of Edinburgh in 1945 with a thesis entitled “The quantitative study of foot-and-mouth disease virus”. Henderson remained at Pirbright until 1956.

From 1972 to 1978, he was Secretary of the Agricultural Research Council. He was knighted in 1976. Henderson was elected as a Fellow of the Royal Society in 1976 and a Fellow of the Royal Society of Edinburgh in 1977. His proposers for the latter were Sir William Weipers, Sir John N Ritchie, Sir Alexander Robertson, and Robert Comline.

Following retirement he became the Director of London Zoo.

== Family ==
In 1941 he married Alys Beryl Goodridge; they had four sons.
