= Robert George Spencer Hudson =

- Born: 17 November 1895
- Died: 29 December 1965 (aged 70)
- Education: University College London
- Awards: Murchison Medal (1958); Fellow of the Royal Society (1961)
- Scientific career
- Workplaces: Trinity College, Dublin; University of Leeds

Robert George Spencer Hudson (17 November 1895 – 29 December 1965) was an English geologist and paleontologist. He was born in Rugby, Warwickshire, the eldest son of Robert Spencer Hudson.

== Education ==
Hudson was educated at St Matthew's School and then Lawrence Sheriff School, where his interest in geology was started through a schoolmaster taking the students fossil hunting in the strata used for cement making.

Hudson left school in 1913 and became a student teacher at Elborow Boys' School. In World War I, he served in the Artists' Rifles and the Royal Warwickshire Regiment, becoming a second lieutenant (acting captain). In 1918 he went to University College London, to read geology, graduating with first class honours in 1920.

== Career ==
Hudsons's early career was academic, first at University College London, and then at the University of Leeds, where he became professor of geology. In 1946 he joined the Iraq Petroleum Company and did extensive field trips to Kurdistan, British Mandate of Palestine, Iraq, and Oman. He retired from Iraq Petroleum Company in 1958, and became an Iveagh Research Fellow at Trinity College, Dublin in 1960. He was appointed to the chair of geology and mineralogy there in 1961.

In 1958 he was awarded the Murchison Medal by the Geological Society of London for "his significant contribution to the science by means of a substantial body of research."

He was elected as a Fellow of the Royal Society in 1961. He was also vice president of the Geological Society of London and founder president of the Palaeontological Association. Between 1923 and 1966 over one hundred of his papers were published. He died in his college rooms in Dublin.

Two of his brothers awarded an MBE: William Spencer Hudson for his work as regional fuel engineer in Nottingham and Edward Charles Hudson during World War II.
