= Robert Hudson (FRS) =

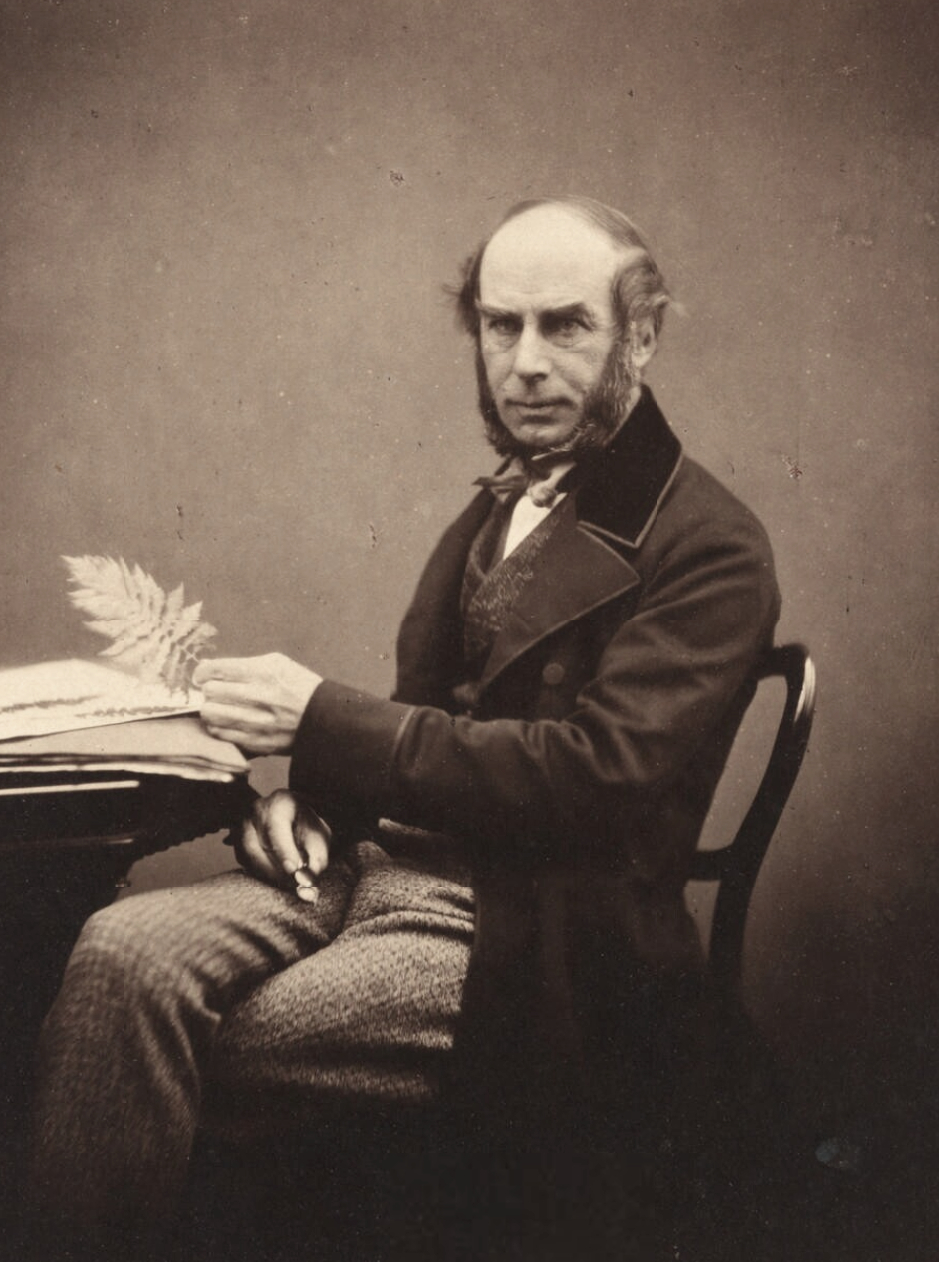
Robert Hudson, photograph c.1855

Robert Hudson (1801–1883) was an English naturalist. A gentleman of wealth, he became a Fellow of the Royal Society in 1834.

== Early life and background, and the Cottons ==
He was the son of Captain Robert Hudson of the British East India Company and his wife Demetria Cotton, born in Camberwell. His mother was a niece of Charles Rogers, and aunt to William Cotton (1794–1863) the art collector and John Cotton the ornithologist.

Robert Hudson senior was a naval captain, and became a shipowner. He died in 1817, leaving his only son Robert junior a large fortune.

Hudson matriculated at New College, Oxford in 1823. There he knew John Wordsworth (1803–1875), eldest son of William Wordsworth. He went up to New College some months after his cousin Edward Cotton, son of his mother's brother William Cotton of Clapham FSA. Neither he nor Cotton completed a degree.

== The Inglis merchantman and the Borradailes ==
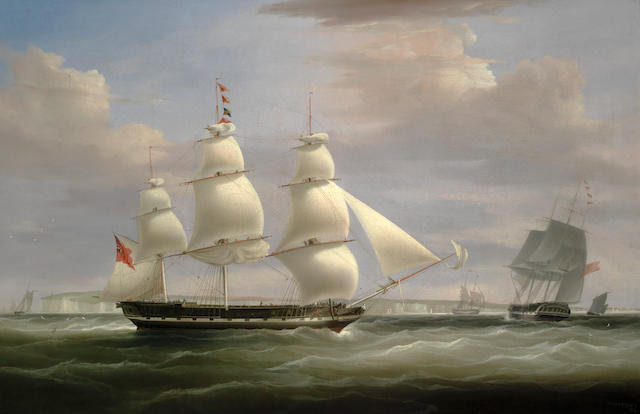
Inglis merchantman for the East India Company, 1820 picture off Dover

Robert Hudson senior had a share in the Inglis merchantman, launched 1811 at Penang. The Inglis was one of the East Indies ships operated by the Borradaile brothers, William (1750–1831) and Richardson Borradaile 1762–1835, Member of Parliament for Newcastle-under-Lyme. She was in service with the East India Company fleet to 1834, when she was bought out by Richardson Borradaile, trading with China. She continued to trade with India, with various, to 1844 when she was reported wrecked.

The Hudsons, Cottons and Borradailes were close-knit. Richardson Borradaile married Elizabeth Cotton, Hudson's aunt, in 1786. Hudson's sister Demetria married in 1826 the Rev. Frederick Borradaile (1798–1876), son of Richardson Borradaile and her first cousin.

== Interests ==
After coming down from Oxford, Hudson made a number of British tours, of which he kept journals. On a tour in autumn 1831 including the Lake District, he met William Wordsworth. He botanised with George Luxford. Travel records by Hudson from the period 1818 to 1834 went to the Bodleian Library.

His cousin John Cotton sent botanical and anthropological specimens to Hudson from Australia, and to his brother William Cotton. These were supposed to be for sale, which did not prove possible, and were in fact unwelcome. In 1873 Hudson donated geological specimens and fossils to King's College, London.

Hudson became a Fellow of the Geological Society in 1832, and Fellow of the Linnean Society in 1848. He served on the councils of the Palaeontographical Society, and of the Zoological Society of London. He joined the Royal Society of Arts in 1870, and the Quekett Microscopical Club in 1872.

== Property ==
Hudson lived on Clapham Common for over half a century, and was a justice of the peace in Surrey.

Through his connection with Richardson Borradaile, Hudson gained a share as lord of the manor of Tooting Bec, which had been sold in 1816 by John Russell, 6th Duke of Bedford, to Borradaile and Maximilian Richard Kymer. Hudson consolidated the lordship from the Kymer family, and sold it to the Metropolitan Board of Works in 1873.

== Family ==
Hudson married in 1835 Julia Twining, daughter of John Aldred Twining. Their children included:

- The Rev. Robert Hudson (born 1835/6), their eldest son, married in 1861 Marion Fisher, daughter of George Fisher, banker of Cambridge.
- William Hudson (1837–1931) FSA, cleric.
