= Biotechnology =

Field of science that uses cells for the creation of products

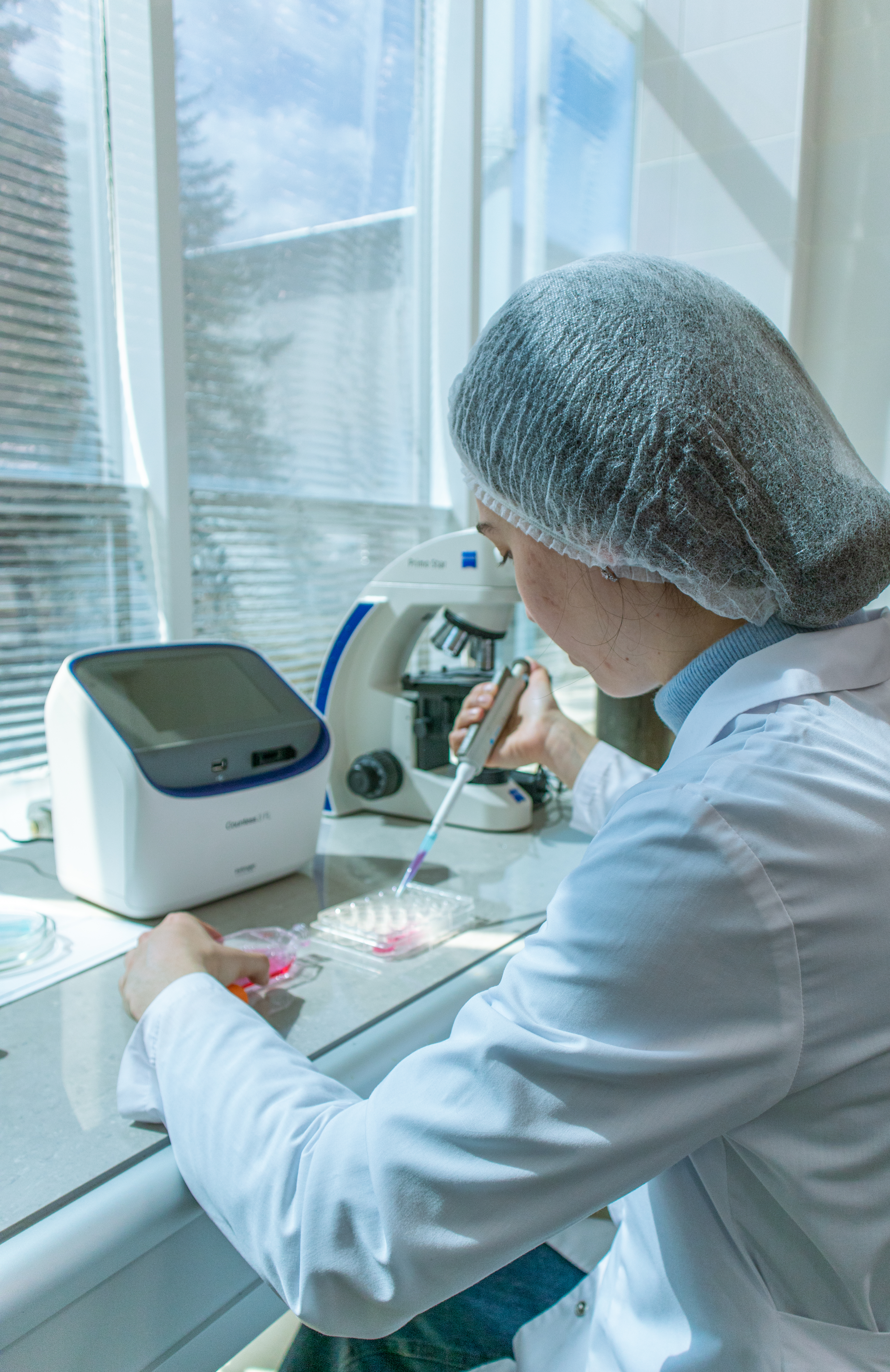
A biologist conducting research in a biotechnology laboratory

Biotechnology is a multidisciplinary field that involves the integration of natural sciences and engineering sciences to achieve the application of organisms and parts thereof for products and services.

The term biotechnology was first used by Károly Ereky in 1919 to refer to the production of products from raw materials with the aid of living organisms. The core principle of biotechnology involves harnessing biological systems and organisms, such as bacteria, yeast, and plants, to perform specific tasks or produce valuable substances.

Biotechnology has a significant impact on many areas of society, from medicine to agriculture to environmental science. One of the key techniques used in biotechnology is genetic engineering, which allows scientists to modify the genetic makeup of organisms to achieve desired outcomes. This can involve inserting genes from one organism into another, and consequently, creating new traits or modifying existing ones through gene editing.

Other important techniques used in biotechnology include tissue culture, which allows researchers to grow cells and tissues in the lab for research and medical purposes, and fermentation, which is used to produce a wide range of products such as beer, wine, and cheese.

The applications of biotechnology are diverse and have led to the development of products like drugs, biofuels, genetically modified crops, and innovative materials. It has also been used to address environmental challenges, such as developing biodegradable plastics and using microorganisms to clean up contaminated sites.

Biotechnology is a rapidly evolving field with significant potential to address pressing global challenges and improve the quality of life for people around the world; however, despite its numerous benefits, it also poses ethical and societal challenges, such as questions around genetic modification and intellectual property rights. As a result, there is ongoing debate and regulation surrounding the use and application of biotechnology in various industries and fields.

Biotechnology encompasses a wide range of procedures for modifying living organisms for human purposes, going back to domestication of animals, the cultivation of plants, and "improvements" to these through breeding programs that employ artificial selection and hybridization. Modern usage also includes genetic engineering, as well as cell and tissue culture technologies. The American Chemical Society defines biotechnology as the application of biological organisms, systems, or processes by various industries to learning about the science of life and the improvement of the value of materials and organisms, such as pharmaceuticals, crops, and livestock. As per the European Federation of Biotechnology, biotechnology is the integration of natural science and organisms, cells, parts thereof, and molecular analogues for products and services. Biotechnology is based on the basic biological sciences (e.g., molecular biology, biochemistry, cell biology, embryology, genetics, microbiology) and conversely provides methods to support and perform basic research in biology.

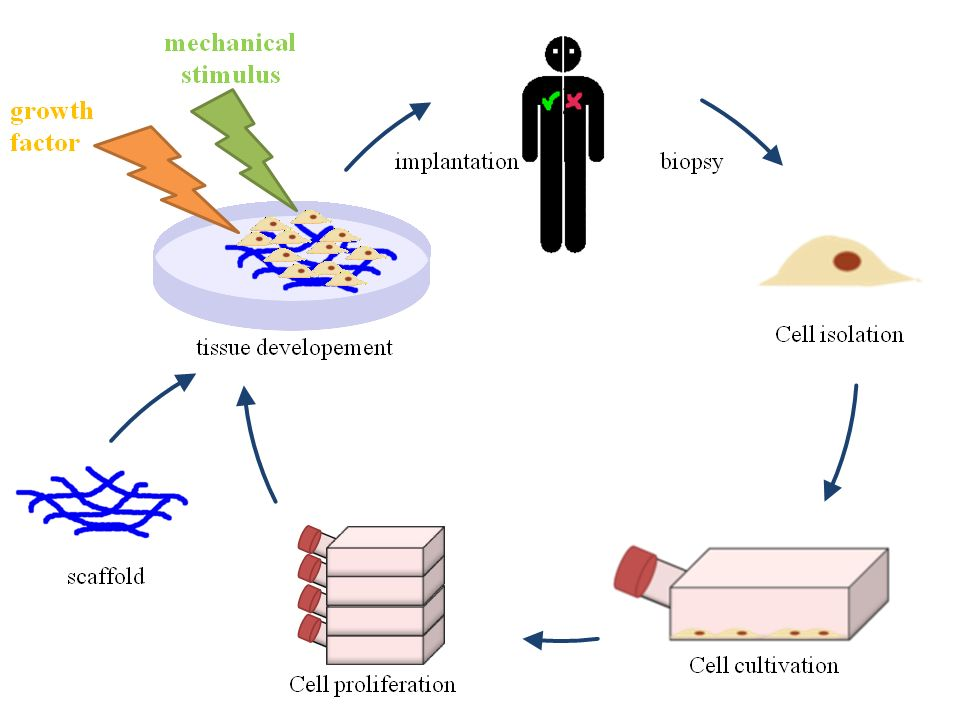
Principles of Tissue Engineering

Biotechnology is the research and development in the laboratory using bioinformatics for exploration, extraction, exploitation, and production from any living organisms and any source of biomass by means of biochemical engineering where high value-added products could be planned (reproduced by biosynthesis, for example), forecasted, formulated, developed, manufactured, and marketed for the purpose of sustainable operations (for the return from bottomless initial investment on R & D) and gaining durable patents rights (for exclusives rights for sales, and prior to this to receive national and international approval from the results on animal experiment and human experiment, especially on the pharmaceutical branch of biotechnology to prevent any undetected side-effects or safety concerns by using the products). The utilization of biological processes, organisms or systems to produce products that are anticipated to improve human lives is termed biotechnology.

By contrast, bioengineering is generally thought of as a related field that more heavily emphasizes higher systems approaches (not necessarily the altering or using of biological materials directly) for interfacing with and utilizing living things. Bioengineering is the application of the principles of engineering and natural sciences to tissues, cells, and molecules. This can be considered as the use of knowledge from working with and manipulating biology to achieve a result that can improve functions in plants and animals. Relatedly, biomedical engineering is an overlapping field that often draws upon and applies biotechnology (by various definitions), especially in certain sub-fields of biomedical or chemical engineering such as tissue engineering, biopharmaceutical engineering, and genetic engineering.

== History ==
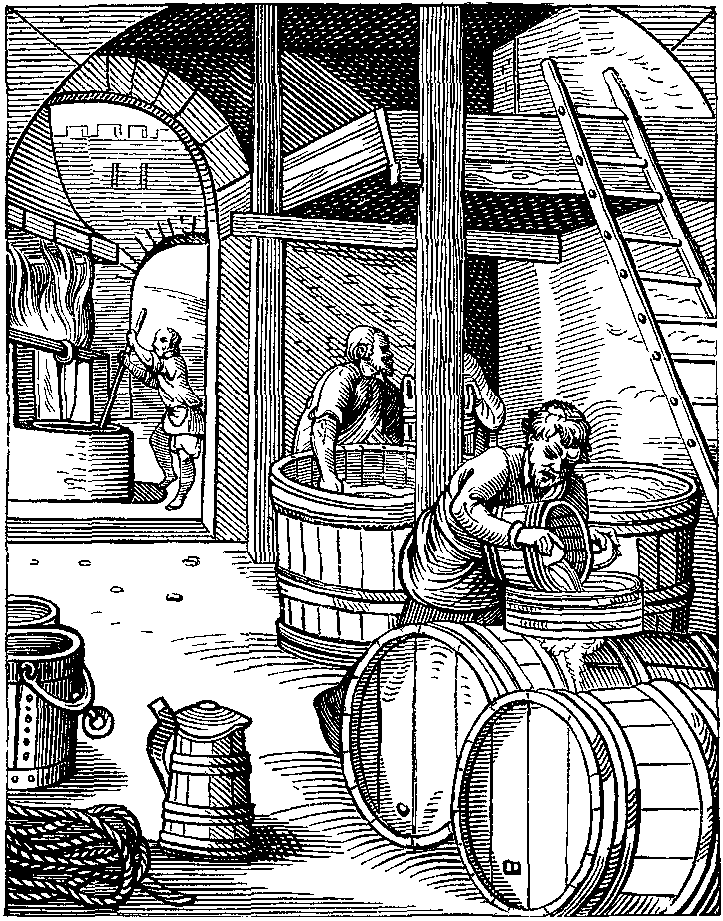
Brewing was an early application of biotechnology (16th century engraving by Jost Amman).

Many forms of human-derived agriculture fit the broad definition of "utilizing a biotechnological system to make products". The cultivation of plants may be viewed as the earliest biotechnological enterprise.

Agriculture has been theorized to have become the dominant way of producing food since the Neolithic Revolution. Through early biotechnology, the earliest farmers selected and bred the best-suited crops (e.g., those with the highest yields) to produce enough food to support a growing population. As crops and fields became increasingly large and difficult to maintain, it was discovered that specific organisms and their by-products could effectively fertilize, restore nitrogen, and control pests. Throughout the history of agriculture, farmers have inadvertently altered the genetics of their crops through introducing them to new environments and breeding them with other plants — one of the first forms of biotechnology.

These processes were also included in the early fermentation of beer. These processes were introduced in early Mesopotamia, Egypt, China and India, and still use the same basic biological methods. In brewing, malted grains (containing enzymes) convert starch from grains into sugar and then adding specific yeasts to produce beer. In this process, carbohydrates in the grains broke down into alcohols, such as ethanol. Later, other cultures developed the process of lactic acid fermentation, which produced other preserved foods, such as soy sauce. Fermentation was also used in this time period to produce leavened bread. Although the process of fermentation was not fully understood until Louis Pasteur's work in 1857, it is still the first use of biotechnology to convert a food source into another form.

Before the time of Charles Darwin's work and life, animal and plant scientists had already used selective breeding. Darwin added to that body of work with his scientific observations about the ability of science to change species. These accounts contributed to Darwin's theory of natural selection.

For thousands of years, humans have used selective breeding to improve the production of crops and livestock to use them for food. In selective breeding, organisms with desirable characteristics are mated to produce offspring with the same characteristics. For example, this technique was used with corn to produce the largest and sweetest crops.

In the early twentieth century scientists gained a greater understanding of microbiology and explored ways of manufacturing specific products. In 1917, Chaim Weizmann first used a pure microbiological culture in an industrial process, that of manufacturing corn starch using Clostridium acetobutylicum, to produce acetone, which the United Kingdom desperately needed to manufacture explosives during World War I.

Biotechnology has also led to the development of antibiotics. In 1928, Alexander Fleming discovered the mold Penicillium. His work led to the purification of the antibiotic formed by the mold by Howard Florey, Ernst Boris Chain and Norman Heatley – to form what we today know as penicillin. In 1940, penicillin became available for medicinal use to treat bacterial infections in humans.

The field of modern biotechnology is generally thought of as having been born in 1971 when Paul Berg's (Stanford) experiments in gene splicing had early success. Herbert W. Boyer (Univ. Calif. at San Francisco) and Stanley N. Cohen (Stanford) significantly advanced the new technology in 1972 by transferring genetic material into a bacterium, such that the imported material would be reproduced. The commercial viability of a biotechnology industry was significantly expanded on June 16, 1980, when the United States Supreme Court ruled that a genetically modified microorganism could be patented in the case of Diamond v. Chakrabarty. Indian-born Ananda Chakrabarty, working for General Electric, had modified a bacterium (of the genus Pseudomonas) capable of breaking down crude oil, which he proposed to use in treating oil spills. (Chakrabarty's work did not involve gene manipulation but rather the transfer of entire organelles between strains of the Pseudomonas bacterium).

The MOSFET was invented at Bell Labs between 1955 and 1960, Two years later, Leland C. Clark and Champ Lyons invented the first biosensor in 1962. Biosensor MOSFETs were later developed, and they have since been widely used to measure physical, chemical, biological and environmental parameters. The first BioFET was the ion-sensitive field-effect transistor (ISFET), invented by Piet Bergveld in 1970. It is a special type of MOSFET, where the metal gate is replaced by an ion-sensitive membrane, electrolyte solution and reference electrode. The ISFET is widely used in biomedical applications, such as the detection of DNA hybridization, biomarker detection from blood, antibody detection, glucose measurement, pH sensing, and genetic technology.

By the mid-1980s, other BioFETs had been developed, including the gas sensor FET (GASFET), pressure sensor FET (PRESSFET), chemical field-effect transistor (ChemFET), reference ISFET (REFET), enzyme-modified FET (ENFET) and immunologically modified FET (IMFET). By the early 2000s, BioFETs such as the DNA field-effect transistor (DNAFET), gene-modified FET (GenFET) and cell-potential BioFET (CPFET) had been developed.

A factor influencing the biotechnology sector's success is improved intellectual property rights legislation—and enforcement—worldwide, as well as strengthened demand for medical and pharmaceutical products.

Rising demand for biofuels is expected to be good news for the biotechnology sector, with the Department of Energy estimating ethanol usage could reduce U.S. petroleum-derived fuel consumption by up to 30% by 2030. The biotechnology sector has allowed the U.S. farming industry to rapidly increase its supply of corn and soybeans—the main inputs into biofuels—by developing genetically modified seeds that resist pests and drought. By increasing farm productivity, biotechnology boosts biofuel production.

== Examples ==
Biotechnology has applications in four major industrial areas, including health care (medical), crop production and agriculture, non-food (industrial) uses of crops and other products (e.g., biodegradable plastics, vegetable oil, biofuels), and environmental uses.

For example, one application of biotechnology is the directed use of microorganisms for the manufacture of organic products (examples include beer and milk products). Another example is using naturally present bacteria by the mining industry in bioleaching. Biotechnology is also used to recycle, treat waste, clean up sites contaminated by industrial activities (bioremediation), and also to produce biological weapons.

A series of derived terms have been coined to identify several branches of biotechnology, for example:

- Bioinformatics (or "gold biotechnology") is an interdisciplinary field that addresses biological problems using computational techniques, and makes the rapid organization as well as analysis of biological data possible. The field may also be referred to as computational biology, and can be defined as, "conceptualizing biology in terms of molecules and then applying informatics techniques to understand and organize the information associated with these molecules, on a large scale". Bioinformatics plays a key role in various areas, such as functional genomics, structural genomics, and proteomics, and forms a key component in the biotechnology and pharmaceutical sector.
- Blue biotechnology is based on the exploitation of sea resources to create products and industrial applications. This branch of biotechnology is the most used for the industries of refining and combustion principally on the production of bio-oils with photosynthetic micro-algae.
- Green biotechnology is biotechnology applied to agricultural processes. An example would be the selection and domestication of plants via micropropagation. Another example is the designing of transgenic plants to grow under specific environments in the presence (or absence) of chemicals. One hope is that green biotechnology might produce more environmentally friendly solutions than traditional industrial agriculture. An example of this is the engineering of a plant to express a pesticide, thereby ending the need of external application of pesticides. An example of this would be Bt corn. Whether or not green biotechnology products such as this are ultimately more environmentally friendly is a topic of considerable debate. It is commonly considered as the next phase of green revolution, which can be seen as a platform to eradicate world hunger by using technologies which enable the production of more fertile and resistant, towards biotic and abiotic stress, plants and ensures application of environmentally friendly fertilizers and the use of biopesticides, it is mainly focused on the development of agriculture. On the other hand, some of the uses of green biotechnology involve microorganisms to clean and reduce waste.
- Red biotechnology is the use of biotechnology in the medical and pharmaceutical industries, and health preservation. This branch involves the production of vaccines and antibiotics, regenerative therapies, creation of artificial organs and new diagnostics of diseases. As well as the development of hormones, stem cells, antibodies, siRNA and diagnostic tests.
- White biotechnology, also known as industrial biotechnology, is biotechnology applied to industrial processes. An example is the designing of an organism to produce a useful chemical. Another example is the using of enzymes as industrial catalysts to either produce valuable chemicals or destroy hazardous/polluting chemicals. White biotechnology tends to consume less in resources than traditional processes used to produce industrial goods.
- Yellow biotechnology refers to the use of biotechnology in food production (food industry), for example in making wine (winemaking), cheese (cheesemaking), and beer (brewing) by fermentation. It has also been used to refer to biotechnology applied to insects. This includes biotechnology-based approaches for the control of harmful insects, the characterisation and utilisation of active ingredients or genes of insects for research, or application in agriculture and medicine and various other approaches.
- Gray biotechnology is dedicated to environmental applications, and focused on the maintenance of biodiversity and the remotion of pollutants.
- Brown biotechnology is related to the management of arid lands and deserts. One application is the creation of enhanced seeds that resist extreme environmental conditions of arid regions, which is related to the innovation, creation of agriculture techniques and management of resources.
- Violet biotechnology is related to law, ethical and philosophical issues around biotechnology.
- Microbial biotechnology has been proposed for the rapidly emerging area of biotechnology applications in space and microgravity (space bioeconomy)
- Dark biotechnology is the color associated with bioterrorism or biological weapons and biowarfare which uses microorganisms, and toxins to cause diseases and death in humans, livestock and crops.

=== Medicine ===
In medicine, modern biotechnology has many applications in areas such as pharmaceutical drug discoveries and production, pharmacogenomics, and genetic testing (or genetic screening). In 2021, nearly 40% of the total company value of pharmaceutical biotech companies worldwide were active in Oncology with Neurology and Rare Diseases being the other two big applications.

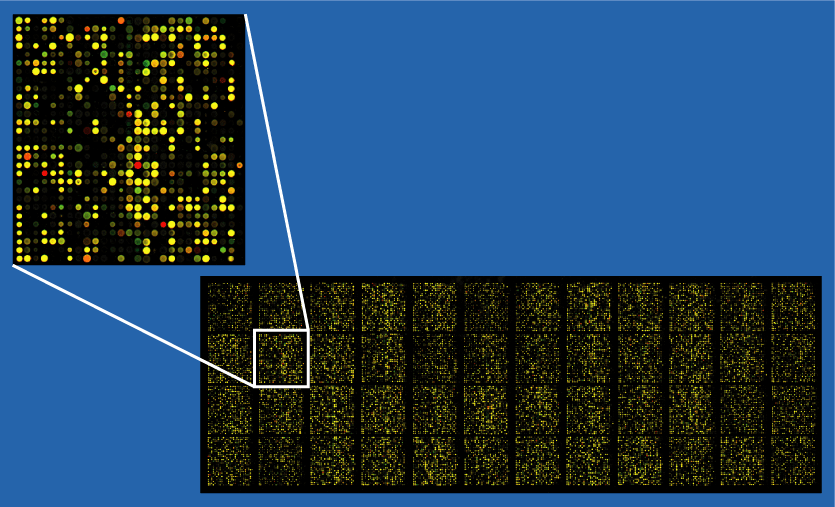
DNA microarray chip – some can do as many as a million blood tests at once.

Pharmacogenomics (a combination of pharmacology and genomics) is the technology that analyses how genetic makeup affects an individual's response to drugs. Researchers in the field investigate the influence of genetic variation on drug responses in patients by correlating gene expression or single-nucleotide polymorphisms with a drug's efficacy or toxicity. The purpose of pharmacogenomics is to develop rational means to optimize drug therapy, with respect to the patients' genotype, to ensure maximum efficacy with minimal adverse effects. Such approaches promise the advent of "personalized medicine"; in which drugs and drug combinations are optimized for each individual's unique genetic makeup.

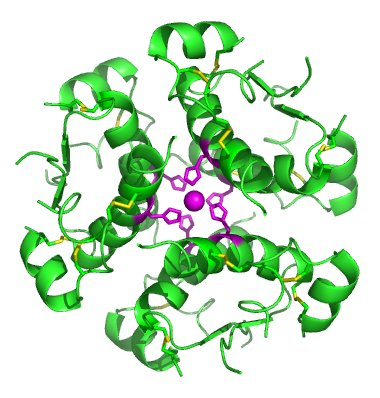
Computer-generated image of insulin hexamers highlighting the threefold symmetry, the zinc ions holding it together, and the histidine residues involved in zinc binding

Biotechnology has contributed to the discovery and manufacturing of traditional small molecule pharmaceutical drugs as well as drugs that are the product of biotechnology – biopharmaceutics. Modern biotechnology can be used to manufacture existing medicines relatively easily and cheaply. The first genetically engineered products were medicines designed to treat human diseases. To cite one example, in 1978 Genentech developed synthetic humanized insulin by joining its gene with a plasmid vector inserted into the bacterium Escherichia coli. Insulin, widely used for the treatment of diabetes, was previously extracted from the pancreas of abattoir animals (cattle or pigs). The genetically engineered bacteria are able to produce large quantities of synthetic human insulin at relatively low cost. Biotechnology has also enabled emerging therapeutics like gene therapy. The application of biotechnology to basic science (for example through the Human Genome Project) has also dramatically improved our understanding of biology and as our scientific knowledge of normal and disease biology has increased, our ability to develop new medicines to treat previously untreatable diseases has increased as well.

Genetic testing allows the genetic diagnosis of vulnerabilities to inherited diseases, and can also be used to determine a child's parentage (genetic mother and father) or in general a person's ancestry. In addition to studying chromosomes to the level of individual genes, genetic testing in a broader sense includes biochemical tests for the possible presence of genetic diseases, or mutant forms of genes associated with increased risk of developing genetic disorders. Genetic testing identifies changes in chromosomes, genes, or proteins. Most of the time, testing is used to find changes that are associated with inherited disorders. The results of a genetic test can confirm or rule out a suspected genetic condition or help determine a person's chance of developing or passing on a genetic disorder. As of 2011 several hundred genetic tests were in use. Since genetic testing may open up ethical or psychological problems, genetic testing is often accompanied by genetic counseling.

=== Agriculture ===
Genetically modified crops ("GM crops", or "biotech crops") are plants used in agriculture, the DNA of which has been modified with genetic engineering techniques. In most cases, the main aim is to introduce a new trait that does not occur naturally in the species. Biotechnology firms can contribute to future food security by improving the nutrition and viability of urban agriculture. Furthermore, the protection of intellectual property rights encourages private sector investment in agrobiotechnology.

Examples in food crops include resistance to certain pests, diseases, stressful environmental conditions, resistance to chemical treatments (e.g. resistance to a herbicide), reduction of spoilage, or improving the nutrient profile of the crop. Examples in non-food crops include production of pharmaceutical agents, biofuels, and other industrially useful goods, as well as for bioremediation.

Farmers have widely adopted GM technology. Between 1996 and 2011, the total surface area of land cultivated with GM crops had increased by a factor of 94, from 17,000 to 1,600,000 square kilometers (4,200,000 to 395,400,000 acres). 10% of the world's crop lands were planted with GM crops in 2010. As of 2011, 11 different transgenic crops were grown commercially on 395 million acres (160 million hectares) in 29 countries such as the US, Brazil, Argentina, India, Canada, China, Paraguay, Pakistan, South Africa, Uruguay, Bolivia, Australia, Philippines, Myanmar, Burkina Faso, Mexico, and Spain.

Genetically modified foods are foods produced from organisms that have had specific changes introduced into their DNA with the methods of genetic engineering. These techniques have allowed for the introduction of new crop traits as well as a far greater control over a food's genetic structure than previously afforded by methods such as selective breeding and mutation breeding. Commercial sale of genetically modified foods began in 1994, when Calgene first marketed its Flavr Savr delayed ripening tomato. To date most genetic modification of foods have primarily focused on cash crops in high demand by farmers such as soybean, corn, canola, and cotton seed oil. These have been engineered for resistance to pathogens and herbicides and better nutrient profiles. GM livestock have also been experimentally developed; in November 2013 none were available on the market, but in 2015 the FDA approved the first GM salmon for commercial production and consumption.

There is a scientific consensus that currently available food derived from GM crops poses no greater risk to human health than conventional food, but that each GM food needs to be tested on a case-by-case basis before introduction. Nonetheless, members of the public are much less likely than scientists to perceive GM foods as safe. The legal and regulatory status of GM foods varies by country, with some nations banning or restricting them, and others permitting them with widely differing degrees of regulation.

GM crops also provide a number of ecological benefits, if not used in excess. Insect-resistant crops have proven to lower pesticide usage, therefore reducing the environmental impact of pesticides as a whole. However, opponents have objected to GM crops per se on several grounds, including environmental concerns, whether food produced from GM crops is safe, whether GM crops are needed to address the world's food needs, and economic concerns raised by the fact these organisms are subject to intellectual property law.

Biotechnology has several applications in the realm of food security. Crops like Golden rice are engineered to have higher nutritional content, and there is potential for food products with longer shelf lives. Though not a form of agricultural biotechnology, vaccines can help prevent diseases found in animal agriculture. Additionally, agricultural biotechnology can expedite breeding processes in order to yield faster results and provide greater quantities of food. Transgenic biofortification in cereals has been considered as a promising method to combat malnutrition in India and other countries.

=== Industrial ===
Industrial biotechnology (known mainly in Europe as white biotechnology) is the application of biotechnology for industrial purposes, including industrial fermentation. It includes the practice of using cells such as microorganisms, or components of cells like enzymes, to generate industrially useful products in sectors such as chemicals, food and feed, detergents, paper and pulp, textiles and biofuels. In the current decades, significant progress has been done in creating genetically modified organisms (GMOs) that enhance the diversity of applications and economical viability of industrial biotechnology. By using renewable raw materials to produce a variety of chemicals and fuels, industrial biotechnology is actively advancing towards lowering greenhouse gas emissions and moving away from a petrochemical-based economy.

Synthetic biology is considered one of the essential cornerstones in industrial biotechnology due to its financial and sustainable contribution to the manufacturing sector. Jointly biotechnology and synthetic biology play a crucial role in generating cost-effective products with nature-friendly features by using bio-based production instead of fossil-based. Synthetic biology can be used to engineer model microorganisms, such as Escherichia coli, by genome editing tools to enhance their ability to produce bio-based products, such as bioproduction of medicines and biofuels. For instance, E. coli and Saccharomyces cerevisiae in a consortium could be used as industrial microbes to produce precursors of the chemotherapeutic agent paclitaxel by applying the metabolic engineering in a co-culture approach to exploit the benefits from the two microbes.

Another example of synthetic biology applications in industrial biotechnology is the re-engineering of the metabolic pathways of E. coli by CRISPR and CRISPRi systems toward the production of a chemical known as 1,4-butanediol, which is used in fiber manufacturing. In order to produce 1,4-butanediol, the authors alter the metabolic regulation of the Escherichia coli by CRISPR to induce point mutation in the gltA gene, knockout of the sad gene, and knock-in six genes (cat1, sucD, 4hbd, cat2, bld, and bdh). Whereas CRISPRi system used to knockdown the three competing genes (gabD, ybgC, and tesB) that affect the biosynthesis pathway of 1,4-butanediol. Consequently, the yield of 1,4-butanediol significantly increased from 0.9 to 1.8 g/L.

==== Biomanufacturing ====
Biomanufacturing (or bioproduction) is a type of manufacturing or biotechnology that utilizes biological systems to produce commercially important biomaterials and biomolecules for use in medicines, food and beverage processing, and industrial applications. Biomanufacturing products are recovered from natural sources, such as blood, or from cultures of microbes, animal cells, or plant cells grown in specialized equipment. The cells used during the production may have been naturally occurring or derived using genetic engineering techniques.

=== Environmental ===
Environmental biotechnology includes various disciplines that play an essential role in reducing environmental waste and providing environmentally safe processes, such as biofiltration and biodegradation. The environment can be affected by biotechnologies, both positively and adversely. Vallero and others have argued that the difference between beneficial biotechnology (e.g., bioremediation is to clean up an oil spill or hazard chemical leak) versus the adverse effects stemming from biotechnological enterprises (e.g., flow of genetic material from transgenic organisms into wild strains) can be seen as applications and implications, respectively. Cleaning up environmental wastes is an example of an application of environmental biotechnology; whereas loss of biodiversity or loss of containment of a harmful microbe are examples of environmental implications of biotechnology.

Many cities have installed CityTrees, which use biotechnology to filter pollutants from urban atmospheres.

=== Regulation ===
The regulation of genetic engineering concerns approaches taken by governments to assess and manage the risks associated with the use of genetic engineering technology, and the development and release of genetically modified organisms (GMO), including genetically modified crops and genetically modified fish. There are differences in the regulation of GMOs between countries, with some of the most marked differences occurring between the US and Europe. Regulation varies in a given country depending on the intended use of the products of the genetic engineering. For example, a crop not intended for food use is generally not reviewed by authorities responsible for food safety. The European Union differentiates between approval for cultivation within the EU and approval for import and processing. While only a few GMOs have been approved for cultivation in the EU a number of GMOs have been approved for import and processing. The cultivation of GMOs has triggered a debate about the coexistence of GM and non-GM crops. Depending on the coexistence regulations, incentives for the cultivation of GM crops differ.

=== Database for the GMOs used in the EU ===
The EUginius (European GMO Initiative for a Unified Database System) database is intended to help companies, interested private users and competent authorities to find precise information on the presence, detection and identification of GMOs used in the European Union. The information is provided in English.

== Learning ==
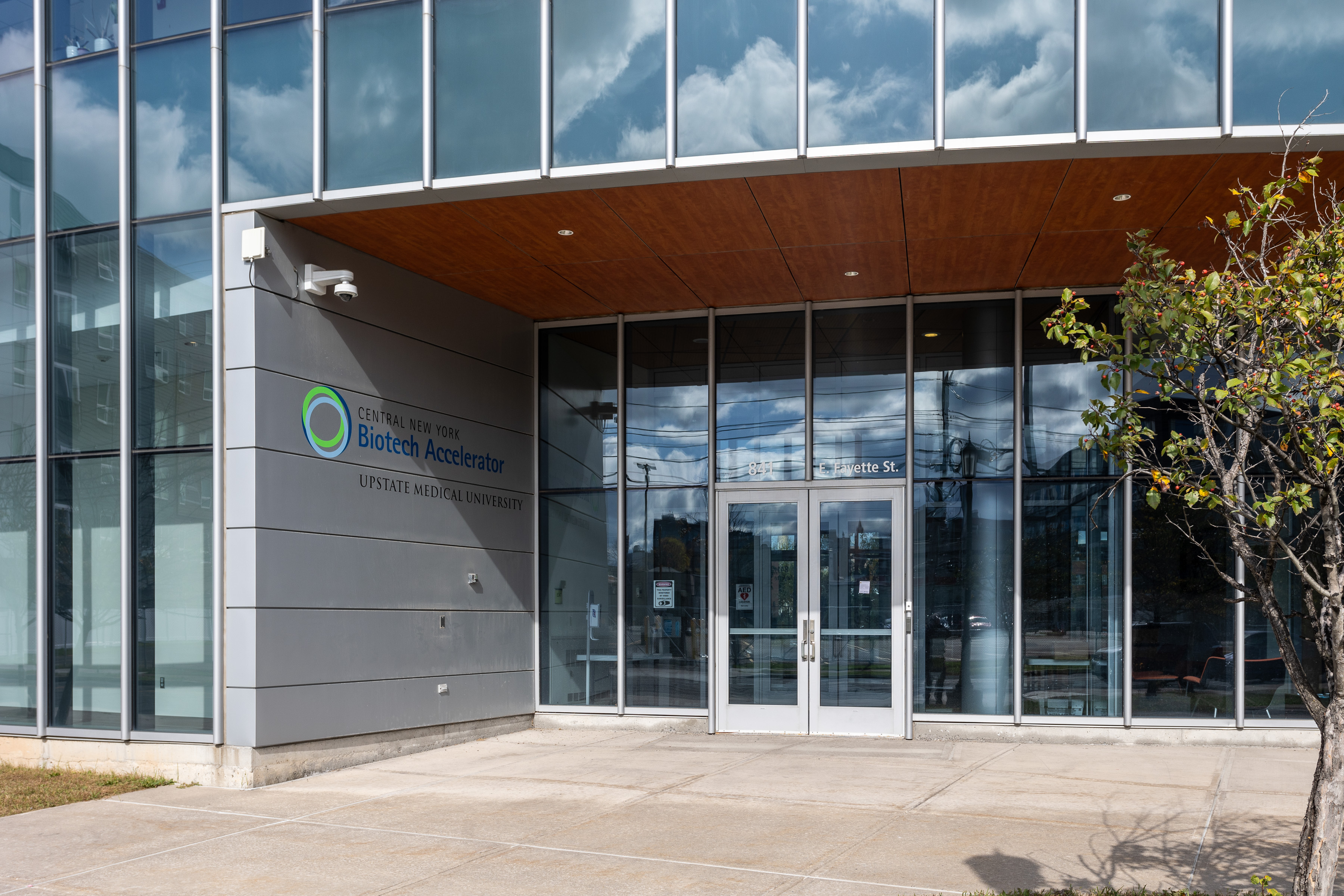
Central New York Biotech Accelerator, Upstate Medical University

In 1988, after prompting from the United States Congress, the National Institute of General Medical Sciences (National Institutes of Health) (NIGMS) instituted a funding mechanism for biotechnology training. Universities nationwide compete for these funds to establish Biotechnology Training Programs (BTPs). Each successful application is generally funded for five years then must be competitively renewed. Graduate students in turn compete for acceptance into a BTP; if accepted, then stipend, tuition and health insurance support are provided for two or three years during the course of their PhD thesis work. Nineteen institutions offer NIGMS supported BTPs. Biotechnology training is also offered at undergraduate level and in community colleges.
