= Károly Ereky =

Hungarian politician

Minister of Food
- In office 17 August 1919 – 24 November 1919
- Preceded by: Ferenc Knittelhoffer
- Succeeded by: István Szabó de Nagyatád

Personal details
- Born: 20 October 1878 Esztergom, Austria-Hungary
- Died: 17 June 1952 (aged 73) Vác, Hungary
- Party: Independent
- Profession: Agricultural engineer

Károly Ereky (German: Karl Ereky; 20 October 1878 – 17 June 1952) was a Hungarian agricultural engineer. The term 'biotechnology' was coined by him in 1919. He is regarded by some as the "father" of biotechnology.

== Early life ==
Ereky was born on 18 October 1878 in Esztergom, Hungary, as Károly Wittmann. His father was István Wittmann and his mother Mária Dukai Takách. (Among her relatives was Judit Dukai Takách (1795-1836) who was the first Hungarian female poet.) In 1893 he changed his name to Ereky. He had three brothers: Jenő, Ferenc and István. Ereky finished grammar school at Sümeg and Székesfehérvár. He attended the Technical University of Budapest and in 1900 received a degree in technical engineering.

There may be a family connection between Ereky and compatriot Franz Wittmann, prominent electrical engineer and inventor of the Wittmann-oscilloscope.

== Career ==
He then worked as machine designer for several paper and food industry companies in Vienna, Austria, until 1905. He moved to Budapest and became an assistant professor in József Technical University. In 1919 he became the Hungarian Minister of Food. He wrote over one hundred publications which were written in Hungarian and published in German. Ereky was also proficient in speaking both German and English.

In 1922 he wrote a book on the mechanisms of chlorophyll and how it can be used for animal feeding. In 1925 he wrote a book on leaf proteins as a possible food source which he also promoted as a commercial product.

=== Biotechnology ===
Ereky coined the word "biotechnology" in Hungary during 1919 in a book he published in Berlin called Biotechnologie der Fleisch-, Fett- und Milcherzeugung im landwirtschaftlichen Grossbetriebe (Biotechnology of Meat, Fat and Milk Production in an Agricultural Large-Scale Farm) where he described a technology based on converting raw materials into a more useful product. He built a slaughterhouse for a thousand pigs and also a fattening farm with space for 50,000 pigs, raising over 100,000 pigs a year. The enterprise was enormous, becoming one of the largest and most profitable meat and fat operations in the world. Ereky further developed a theme that would be reiterated through the 20th century: biotechnology could provide solutions to societal crises, such as food and energy shortages. For Ereky, the term "biotechnology" indicated the process by which raw materials could be biologically upgraded into socially useful products.

The book sold several thousand copies within few weeks in Germany. In 1921 the book was translated into Dutch.

== After WWII and death ==
On 19 September 1946, Ereky was sent to prison in Vác for 12 years by People's Tribunal for his counter-revolutionary role in Hungary. He died in prison on 17 June 1952 at the age of 74.
