= Norman Pirie =

British biochemist (1907–1997)

- Born: 1 July 1907; Easebourne, West Sussex, England
- Died: 29 March 1997 (aged 89); Harpenden, Hertfordshire, England
- Education: Cambridge University
- Known for: crystallization of tomato bushy stunt virus
- Awards: Copley Medal in 1971
- Scientific career
- Fields: virology, leaf protein
- Workplaces: Rothamsted Experimental Station

Norman Wingate Pirie FRS (1 July 1907 – 29 March 1997), was a British biochemist and virologist who, along with Frederick Bawden, discovered that a virus can be crystallized by isolating tomato bushy stunt virus in 1936. This was an important milestone in understanding DNA and RNA.

== Early and personal life ==
Pirie was born in Easebourne, near Midhurst in West Sussex, the youngest of three children of Sir George Pirie, a Scottish painter, and his wife while they were on a visit to England. He was raised near Torrance, East Dunbartonshire. He developed a stammer, and was educated by private tutors and then spent periods at Kelvinside Academy in Glasgow, Harriston School near Dumfries, and Hastings Grammar School, and then from 1921 to 1925 at Rydal School in Colwyn Bay. He studied natural sciences (biochemistry) at Emmanuel College, Cambridge from 1925 to 1929, and became a demonstrator after graduating.

He married fellow biochemist Antoinette Patey in 1931. They had a son and a daughter. Like his wife, he was an atheist, and was concerned about nuclear weapons. He served as chairman of the Campaign for Nuclear Disarmament (CND) scientific committee for several years. His wife died in 1991. He died in Harpenden in 1997, survived by his two children.

== Career ==
He worked at Cambridge University until 1940, working with Sir Frederick Gowland Hopkins. From 1932, he worked with Ashley Miles on the Brucella bacteria responsible for brucellosis, and with Frederick Bawden on potato viruses. They studied the tobacco mosaic virus, demonstrating that the virus contained ribonucleic acid (when others claimed they were just proteins). Bawden moved to Rothamsted Experimental Station in Harpenden in 1936, and Pirie also moved to Rothamsted as a virus physiologist in 1940, becoming head of the biochemistry department from 1947 until 1973. During the Second World War, Pirie investigated the possibility of extracting edible proteins from leaves. Experiments on extracting edible leaf proteins continued into the 1970s.

He was elected a Fellow of the Royal Society in 1949, delivered its Leeuwenhoek Lecture in 1963 and won its Copley Medal in 1971 for his virology work. He retired in 1972, but continued work on beta carotene in leaf proteins, and the use of leaf proteins in new foods for humans.

== Publications ==
Pirie was the author of over 200 scientific publications and book chapters. He continued to publish well into his retirement. His publications include:

- Pirie, N. W. 1994. The bulk extraction and quality of leaf protein in: Linskens, H-F. and Jackson, J. F. (ed.) Modern methods of plant analysis: vegetables and vegetable products Springer-Verlag, Berlin.
- Pirie, N. W. 1987. An economical unit for pressing juice from fibrous pulps. Journal of Agricultural Engineering Research 38 pp. 217-222.
- Pirie, N. W. 1983. New foods - proving leaf proteins worth. Nature 301 (5895) pp. 20-20.
- Pirie, N. W. 1969. The production and use of leaf protein. Proceedings of the Nutrition Society 28 (1) pp. 85-91.
- Bawden, F. C. and Pirie, N. W. 1959. The infectivity and inactivation of nucleic acid preparations from tobacco mosaic virus. Journal of General Microbiology 21 (2) pp. 438-456.
- Bawden, F. C. and Pirie, N. W. 1943. Methods for the purification of tomato bushy stunt and tobacco mosaic viruses. Biochemical Journal 37 (1) pp. 66-70.
- Bawden, F. C., Pirie, N. W., Bernal, J. D. and Fankuchen, I. 1936. Liquid crystalline substances from virus-infected plants. Nature. 138 pp. 1051-1052
