= Stinging nettle =

Stinging nettle may refer to:

- Urtica dioica, a perennial plant originally native to Europe, much of temperate Asia, and western North Africa, now found worldwide

and also to

- plants of the genus Urtica, and less commonly also of the genera Hesperocnide and Laportea

and also specifically to some species of those genera

- American stinging nettle, Urtica gracilis, a perennial plant native to much of the North American continent
- Urtica incisa, a perennial plant native to streams and rainforests of eastern and southern Australia
- Hawaiian stinging nettle, Hesperocnide sandwicensis, a plant endemic to Hawaii
- western stinging nettle, Hesperocnide tenella, species of flowering plant native to California and Northern Baja California

== See also ==
- List of plants known as nettle
- Stinging plant
