= Leeuwenhoek Lecture =

Prize lecture of the UK's Royal Society

Leeuwenhoek Lecture and Medal
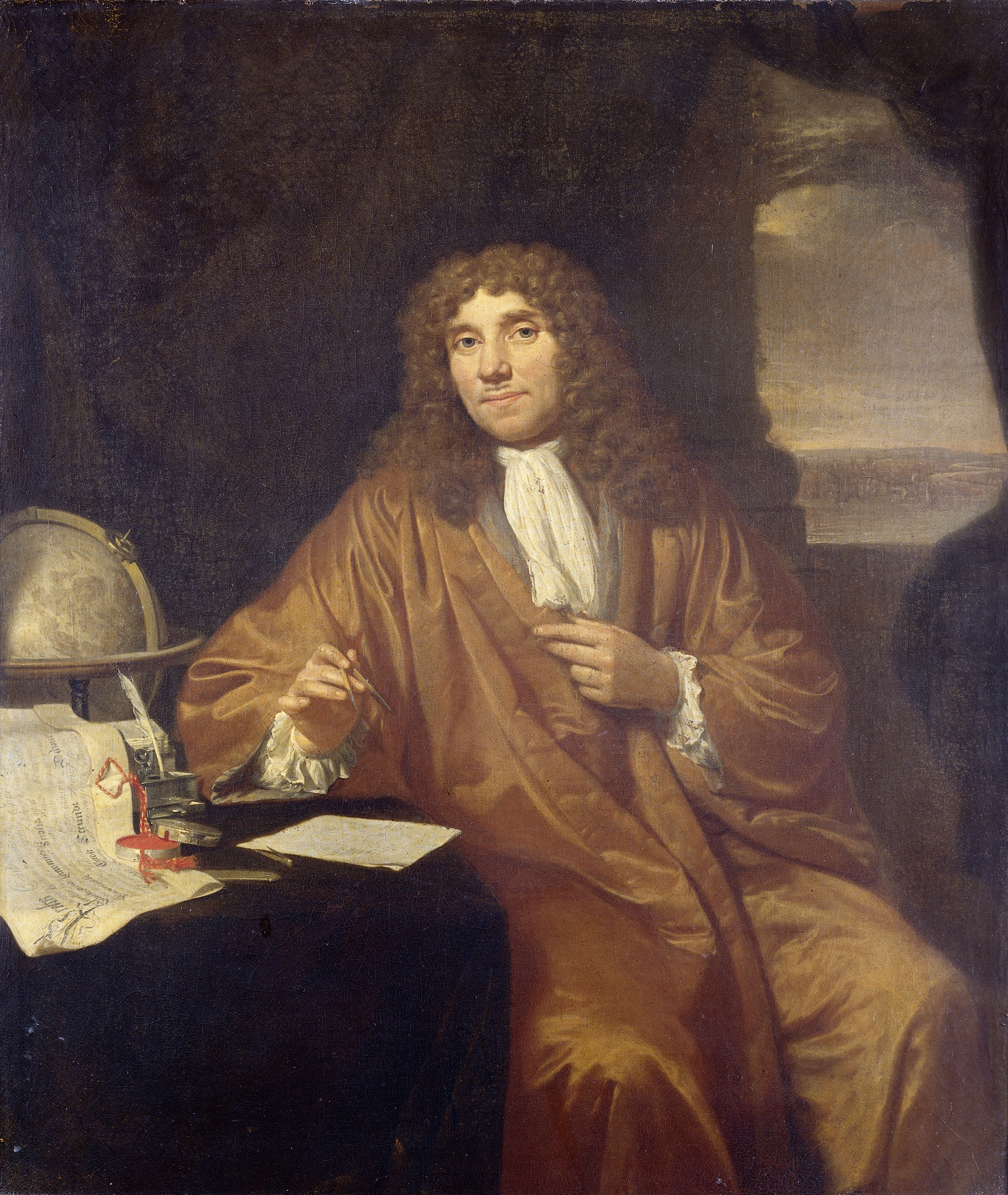
- The Leeuwenhoek Lecture and Medal is named in honour of the scientist Antonie van Leeuwenhoek (1632–1723)
- Awarded for: Recognising excellence in the field of microbiology, bacteriology, virology, mycology and parasitology, and microscopy
- Location: London
- Presented by: Royal Society
- Reward(s): £2000 and Medal
- Website: royalsociety.org/grants-schemes-awards/awards/leeuwenhoek-lecture/

The Leeuwenhoek Lecture is a prize lecture of the Royal Society to recognize achievement in microbiology. The prize was originally given in 1950 and awarded annually, but from 2006 to 2018 was given triennially. From 2018 it will be awarded biennially.

The prize is named after the Dutch microscopist Antonie van Leeuwenhoek and was instituted in 1948 from a bequest from George Gabb. A gift of £2000 is associated with the lecture.

== Leeuwenhoek Lecturers ==
The following is a list of Leeuwenhoek Lecture award winners along with the title of their lecture:

=== 21st Century ===
- 2025 Mike Ferguson, for major contributions in discovery science and application to the treatment of neglected infectious diseases
- 2024 Joanne Webster, for her achievements in advancing control of disease in humans and animals caused by parasites in Asia and Africa
- 2022 Sjors Scheres, for ground-breaking contributions and innovations in image analysis and reconstruction methods in electron cryo-microscopy, enabling the structure determination of complex macromolecules of fundamental biological and medical importance to atomic resolution
- 2020 Geoffrey L. Smith, for his studies of poxviruses which has had major impact in wider areas, notably vaccine development, biotechnology, host-pathogen interactions and innate immunity
- 2018 Sarah Cleaveland, Can we make rabies history? Realising the value of research for the global elimination of rabies
- 2015 Jeffrey Errington, for his seminal discoveries in relation to the cell cycle and cell morphogenesis in bacteria
- 2012 Brad Amos, How new science is transforming the optical microscope
- 2010 Robert Gordon Webster, Pandemic Influenza: one flu over the cuckoo's nest
- 2006 Richard Anthony Crowther, Microscopy goes cold: frozen viruses reveal their structural secrets.
- 2005 Keith Chater, Streptomyces inside out: a new perspective on the bacteria that provide us with antibiotics.
- 2004 David Sherratt, A bugs life
- 2003 Brian Spratt, Bacterial populations and bacterial disease
- 2002 Stephen West, DNA repair from microbes to man
- 2001 Robin Weiss, From Pan to pandemic: animal to human infections

=== 20th Century ===
- 2000 Howard Dalton, The natural and unnatural history of methane-oxidising bacteria
- 1999 Peter C. Doherty, Killer T cells and virus infections
- 1998 George A.M. Cross, The genetics and cell biology of antigenic variation in trypanosomes
- 1997 Peter Biggs, Mareks disease, tumours and prevention
- 1996 Julian Davies, Microbial molecular diversity - function, evolution and applications
- 1995 John Guest, Adaptation to life without oxygen
- 1994 Keith Vickerman, The opportunistic parasite
- 1993 Fred Brown, Peptide vaccines, dream or reality.
- 1992 John Postgate, Bacterial evolution and the nitrogen-fixing plant
- 1991 Harry Smith, The influence of the host on microbes that cause disease
- 1990 John Skehel, How enveloped viruses enter cells
- 1989 Piet Borst, Antigenic variation in African trypanosomes
- 1988 Alfred Rupert Hall, Antoni van Leeuwenhoek (1632-1723) and Anglo-Dutch collaboration
- 1987 David Alan Hopwood, Towards an understanding of gene switching in streptomyces, the basis of sporulation and antibiotic production
- 1986 William Fleming Hoggan Jarrett, Environmental carcinogens and paillomaviruses in the pathogenesis of cancer.
- 1985 Kenneth Murray, A molecular biologist's view of viral hepatitis
- 1984 William Duncan Paterson Stewart, The functional organisation of nitrogen-fixing cyanobacteria.
- 1983 Michael Anthony Epstein, A prototype vaccine to prevent Epstein-Barr (E.B.) virus-associated tumours.
- 1982 Hamao Umezawa, Studies of microbial products in rising to the challenge of curing cancer
- 1981 Frank William Ernest Gibson, The biochemical and genetic approach to the study of bioenergetics with the use of Escherichia coli: progress and prospects.
- 1980 David Arthur John Tyrrell, Is it a virus?
- 1979 Patricia Hannah Clarke, Experiments in microbial evolution: new enzymes, new metabolic activities.
- 1978 Hugh John Forster Cairns, Bacteria as proper subjects for cancer research.
- 1977 Francois Jacob, Mouse teratocarcinoma and mouse embryo.
- 1976 Geoffrey Herbert Beale, The varied contributions of protozoa to genetical knowledge
- 1975 Joel Mandelstam, Bacterial sporulation: a problem in the biochemistry and genetics of a primitive development system.
- 1974 Renato Dulbecco, The control of cell growth regulation by tumour-inducing viruses: a challenging problem.
- 1973 Aaron Klug, The structure and assembly of regular viruses
- 1972 Hans Leo Kornberg, Carbohydrate transport by micro-organisms
- 1971 Michael George Parke Stoker, Tumour viruses and the sociology of fibroblasts
- 1970 Philip Herries Gregory, Airborne microbes: their significance and distribution
- 1969 Jacques Lucien Monod, Cellular and molecular cybernetics.
- 1968 Gordon Elliott Fogg, The physiology of an algal nuisance
- 1967 James Baddiley, Teichoic acids and the molecular structure of bacterial walls
- 1966 Percy Wragg Brian, Obligate parasitism in fungi
- 1965 William Hayes, Some controversial aspects of bacterial sexuality
- 1964 Donald Devereux Woods, A pattern of research with two bacterial growth factors
- 1963 Norman Wingate Pirie, The size of small organisms
- 1962 Guido Pontecorvo, Microbial genetics: achievements and prospects
- 1961 Frank John Fenner, Interactions between poxviruses
- 1960 Andre Michel Lwoff, Viral functions
- 1959 Frederick Charles Bawden, Viruses: retrospect and prospect
- 1958 David Keilin, The problem of anabiosis or latent life: history and current concepts
- 1957 Wilson Smith, Virus-host cell interactions
- 1956 Ernest Frederick Gale, The biochemical organization of the bacterial cell
- 1955 Henry Gerard Thornton, The ecology of micro-organisms in soil.
- 1954 Juda Hirsch Quastel, Soil metabolism
- 1953 Kenneth Manley Smith, Some aspects of the behaviour of certain viruses in their hosts and of their development in the cell.
- 1952 Albert Jan Kluyver, The changing appraisal of the microbe
- 1951 Christopher Howard Andrewes, The place of viruses in nature
- 1950 Paul Gordon Fildes, The development of microbiology.
