= Leaf protein concentrate =

Edible substance extracted from leaves

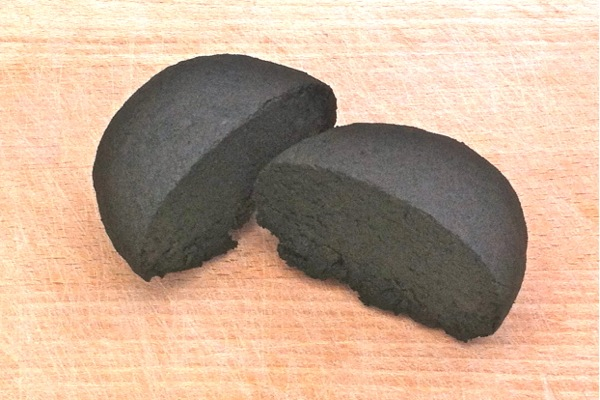
Leaf protein concentrate (Leafu) made from stinging nettles

Leaf protein concentrate (LPC) is a proteinaceous edible mass extracted from leaves. It can be a lucrative source of low-cost and sustainable protein for food as well as feed applications. Although the proteinaceous extracts from leaves have been described as early as 1773 by Rouelle, large scale extraction and production of LPC was pioneered post the World War II. In fact, many innovations and advances made with regards to LPC production occurred in parallel to the Green Revolution. In some respects, these two technologies were complimentary in that the Green Revolution sought to increase agrarian productivity through increased crop yields via fertiliser use, mechanisation and genetically modified crops, while LPC offered the means to better utilise available agrarian resources through efficient protein extraction.

== Sources ==
Over the years, numerous sources have been experimented. Pirie and Telek described LPC production using a combination of pulping and heat coagulation. Leaves are typically sourced from shrubs or agricultural wastes given their ease of access and relative abundance. Trees are generally considered a poor source of leaf mass for the production of LPC given restrictions on the ease of access. Fallen leaves/leaf litter have negligible protein-content and are of no extractive value.

Plants belonging to the Fabaceae family such as clover, peas and legumes have also been prime candidates for LPC production. While most plants have a mean leaf protein content of 4 to 6% w/v. Fabaceae plants tend to have nearly double that value at 8 to 10% v/w, depending on the protein estimation method employed. Other non-traditional sources include agricultural wastes such as pea (Pisum sativum) pods, cauliflower (Brassica oleracea) leaves, as well as invasive plants such as gorse (Ulex europeaus), broom (Cytisus scoparius), and bracken (Pteridium aquilinum).

== Methods of production ==
LPC production processes are two-staged, with the first focusing on the expression of leaf juice or production of a leaf extract, and the second being the purification or protein recovery stage that recovers protein from the solution.

The most commonly employed method of leaf protein extraction is pulping/juicing. Other assisted extraction methods have also been reported such as alkali treatment, pressurised extraction, and enzyme treatment. Each method comes with its own advantages although pulping produces the most "native" protein composition and does not require significant investment in complex machinery.

Alkali extraction has been employed with some success although it significantly affects lysine and threonine residues in the protein. Pressurised extraction have limited success. Enzyme treatment is another well reported method which targets the plant cell wall to aid the release of bound proteins. However, enzymes are generally more expensive compared to physical or chemical methods of protein extraction.

Recovering the protein from the extract however is most critical to the nutritive value of the LPC. Commonly reported methods were heat coagulation, acid precipitation, ultrafiltration, solvent precipitation and chromatography.

Heat coagulation is the easiest and the oldest method of protein recovery, albeit the least preferred as most of the nutritive value of the LPC is lost. Acid precipitation is the most commonly employed method of protein recovery although it results in the loss of methionine and tryptophan in the LPC. Ultrafiltration is the most hardware demanding option for protein recovery although it serves more as a protein concentration step rather than complete recovery. Chromatographic methods may be used in tandem with ultrafiltration to help increase solute mass and subsequent recovery. Solvent precipitation is not often reported although it produces the highest protein recovery among other methods and preserves the nutritional integrity of the LPC. The extraction and purification methods are largely inter-compatible and may be employed depending on local facilities. Interestingly, the purity of the final LPC was influenced by the protein content in the initial leaf mass rather than the purification method employed. Furthermore, the amino acid composition of the LPC was dependent on the extraction method employed.

In laboratory conditions, protein fractions of 96% purity could be produced with a recovery of 56% w/w and an overall yield of 5.5%. Telek on the other hand experimented with numerous tropical plants at a large scale using a combination of pulping and heat coagulation. Yields were around 3% with protein recoveries <50%.

Depending on the purity of the recovered protein, they are either called leaf protein extract (<60% w/w), leaf protein concentrate (>60% w/w), or leaf protein isolate (>90% w/w), although publications use these terms interchangeably.

== Composition ==
Whole leaf protein concentrate is a dark green substance with a texture similar to cheese. Approximately 60% of this is water, while the remaining dry matter is 9-11% nitrogen, 20-25% lipid, 5-10% starch and a variable amount of ash. It is a mixture of many individual proteins. Its flavour has been compared to spinach or tea.

Because the colour and taste may make it unpalatable for humans, LPC can instead be separated into green and white fractions. The green fraction has proteins mainly originating from the chloroplasts, while the white fraction has proteins mainly originating from the cytoplasm.

== Applications ==
LPC was first suggested as a human food in the early 20th century, but it has not achieved much success, despite early promise. Norman Pirie, the Copley Medal winner from the UK, studied LPC and promoted its use for human consumption. He and his team developed machines for extraction of LPC, including low-maintenance "village units" intended for poor rural communities. These were installed in places such as villages in south India. The non profit organization, Leaf for Life, maintains a list of human edible leaves and provides recommendations for the top choices of plants.

There has recently been an interest in using LPCs as an alternative food (or resilient food) during times of catastrophe or food shortages. Such resilient food LPCs would be derived from widely geographically dispersed tree leaves from forests or agricultural waste.

LPC have been evaluated for infant weaning foods.

The increasing reliance on feedlot based animal rearing to satisfy human appetites for meat has increased demand for cheaper vegetable protein sources. This has recently led to renewed interest in LPC to reduce the use of human-edible vegetable protein sources in animal feed.

Leaf protein has had successful trials as a substitute for soy feed for chickens and pigs.

LPC from alfalfa can be included in feed for tilapia as a partial replacement for fish meal.

== Amino acid composition ==
The amino acid composition of the LPC:

Purity of the LPC is expressed as % protein w/w. Amino acid composition (expressed as % w/w protein) of LPC.
Ref	Purity	Ala	Arg	Asp	Glu	Gly	His	Ile	Leu	Lys	Met	Phe	Pro	Ser	Thr	Tyr	Val
	68.6	6.4	8.3	10.3	12.6	5.7	3.4	5.3	9.7	6.9	2.6	6.6	4.8	2.8	5.7	5.4	6.9
	69.8	6.7	7.8	10.8	13.2	5.9	3.3	5.7	10.2	6.3	2.6	7.0	4.3	3.6	5.9	5.6	7.2
	88.5	5.5	12.7	14.2	26.3	5.6	3.0	4.4	7.8	2.8	2.3	5.8	5.1	5.2	3.4	4.0	6.1
	94.9	5.4	12.3	14.9	28.1	6.0	3.1	4.6	8.0	2.3	2.3	5.9	4.9	5.3	3.6	4.1	6.4
	50.0	5.2	5.4	12.0	10.0	4.5	2.0	4.0	7.8	5.5	1.8	5.3	3.3	4.7	4.2	4.1	5.2
	68.8	4.8	10.0	9.3	15.9	4.7	2.9	4.8	7.3	3.5	3.7	4.8	3.5	3.8	4.2	4.2	6.0
	56.0	4.1	7.1	11.5	21.2	4.2	2.3	5.4	7.6	5.8	1.8	5.5	5.1	5.1	3.4	3.9	5.2
	50.0	4.5	4.6	7.9	11.0	4.4	1.7	4.1	8.4	5.7	1.8	6.1	3.0	3.6	3.7	3.3	5.8
	96.9	7.8	6.0	12.7	12.8	7.6	1.7	2.4	8.6	6.8	2.0	4.9	5.3	6.7	4.0	4.6	3.4
	57.2	6.1	6.6	10.5	11.6	5.5	2.6	6.0	9.7	6.6	1.8	6.4	4.7	4.7	5.3	4.8	7.2
	60.1	6.9	6.5	9.4	11.0	6.0	2.3	6.0	10.1	6.8	2.3	6.8	5.9	4.7	5.0	4.6	6.8
	53.6	6.8	6.4	9.4	11.2	5.9	2.6	6.2	9.9	6.1	2.2	7.0	4.7	4.5	5.6	4.7	7.0
	63.1	6.1	6.6	10.1	11.1	5.4	2.6	6.2	10.0	6.2	2.1	6.6	6.0	4.4	5.3	4.7	6.8
	34.0	3.3	3.1	4.5	5.0	2.9	1.1	2.5	4.5	2.6	1.1	3.0	2.3	1.8	2.3	1.9	3.1
	60.7	3.3	3.8	5.8	6.3	3.1	1.5	2.6	5.2	3.9	1.1	3.4	3.0	2.8	3.1	2.8	3.4
	76.4	5.5	14.2	12.5	11.2	5.1	3.5	4.5	7.1	3.0	1.7	5.4	5.5	5.2	3.6	3.2	5.2
	59.8	5.6	7.2	9.8	12.9	4.7	2.9	4.4	9.7	7.6	2.4	6.3	5.3	3.7	5.5	5.7	6.3
	80.0	10.9	4.9	6.5	23.8	2.2	2.1	4.6	13.1	3.4	2.7	7.7	5.1	5.2	2.8	2.9	5.6
	75.6	9.3	4.8	7.7	22	2.9	2.1	4.6	13.6	3.9	3.1	6.3	5.5	4.6	3.7	2.4	5.8
	83.4	3.7	8.5	12.3	6.4	3.4	2.7	3.8	5.0	8.3	1.7	5.8	3.3	4.0	4.5	4.0	5.6
	95.5	4.0	11.5	7.0	14.5	3.9	2.5	4.0	6.7	2.4	3.2	4.8	5.9	4.3	3.6	3.9	4.9
	97.0	4.2	11.2	8.0	13.5	4.0	2.6	4.1	6.6	2.2	2.1	4.6	5.7	4.1	3.7	3.6	5.2
	46.8	8.3	6.9	13.9	15.9	7.4	2.3	7.0	13.2	8.8	2.9	7.7	6.9	3.7	5.9	6.1	9.3
	58.4	6.3	6.2	9.7	11.3	5.7	3.0	4.6	9.1	6.3	1.1	5.9	4.0	4.3	4.9	5.0	5.6
	55.4	3.4	3.6	5.1	5.9	3.0	1.1	2.3	5.1	2.7	1.3	3.4	2.7	2.6	2.6	2.2	2.8
	46.1	6.0	3.4	11.6	12.4	5.9	1.9	6.3	9.0	2.8	1.9	4.4	4.8	4.3	3.1	4.3	5.5

== Dietary issues ==
Leaf protein is a good source of amino acids, with methionine being a limiting factor. It is nutritionally better than seed proteins and comparable to animal proteins (other than those in egg and milk).

In terms of digestibility, whole LPC has digestibility in the range 65–90%. The green fraction has a much lower digestibility that may be <50%, while the white fraction has digestibility >90%.

The challenges that have to be overcome using lucerne and cassava, two high density monoculture crops, include the high fiber content and other antinutritional factors, such as phytate, cyanide, and tannins.

Lablab beans, Moringa oleifera, tree collards and bush clover may also be used. Flavors of different species vary greatly.

For testing new leaf species for use as LPCs a non-targeted approach has been developed that uses an ultra-high-resolution hybrid ion trap orbitrap mass spectrometer with electrospray ionization coupled to an ultra-high pressure two-dimensional liquid chromatograph system. An open source software toolchain was also developed for automated non‐targeted screening of toxic compounds for LPCs. The process uses three tools: 1) mass spectrometry analysis with MZmine 2, 2) formula assignment with MFAssignR, and 3) data filtering with ToxAssign. Studies have looked at the potential for deciduous trees and coniferous tree leaves. The latter showed yields for LPC extraction from 1% to 7.5% and toxicity screenings confirm that coniferous trees may contain toxins that can be consumed in small amounts, and additional studies including measuring the quantity of each toxin are needed.

== See also ==
- Protein (nutrient)
- Green Revolution

== Bibliography ==
1. Pirie, N. W (1971). "Leaf protein:its agronomy, preparation, quality and use". IBP Handbook. Vol. 20. Blackwell Scientific Publications.
2. Pirie, N. W (1975). "Leaf protein: a beneficiary of tribulations". Nature. 253 (5489): 239–241. Bibcode:1975Natur.253..239P. doi:10.1038/253239a0. S2CID 4196894.
