= Fred Brown (virologist) =

English biologist (1925–2004)

Fred Brown (31 January 1925 – 20 February 2004) was a British virologist and molecular biologist.

== Early life ==
He was born in Clayton-le-Moors, Lancashire and lived in neighbouring Burnley, where he was educated at Burnley Grammar School and played cricket for Burnley Cricket Club. He went on to study at Manchester University, where he graduated B.Sc. in chemistry in 1944 and received a Ph.D. in 1946.

== Career ==
He stayed at Manchester as an assistant lecturer for two years before taking a post as a lecturer at the Bristol University Fruit and Vegetable Preservation Research Station (1948–50) followed by one as a senior scientific officer at the Hannah Dairy Research Institute, Ayr (1950–53).

A succession of other appointments followed: senior scientific officer at Christie Hospital, Manchester (1953–55), head of the Biochemistry Department at the Animal Virus Research Institute, Pirbright (now the Institute for Animal Health) (1955–83) (deputy director (1980–83)) and head of the Virology Department at Wellcome Biotechnology Laboratories, Beckenham {1983-90}. He was also appointed professorial fellow at Queen's University, Belfast (1986–2004) and professor of microbiology at Surrey University (1989–90) and adjunct professor, School of Epidemiology and Public Health, Yale University (1990–2004). He was a visiting scientist at the US Department of Agriculture Plum Island Animal Disease Center, New York (1995–2004) and a consultant with the US Department of Agriculture (1990–2004). Most of his efforts were directed towards the study of animal diseases such as foot-and-mouth disease and rabies.

He undertook substantial committee work. He was a member of an international committee on the taxonomy of viruses (1968–1981) (president (1981–1987)), chairman of the comparative virology programme run by WHO and UN, scientific secretary for the International Association of Biological Standardisation (1980); chairman of the Royal Society Biological Education Committee (1983–1987), member of the Spongiform Encephalopathy Advisory Committee (1990–1998) and honorary member of the Society for General Microbiology (1991). He was also member of council and editor-in-chief of the Journal of General Virology (1975–1980) and took part in the Royal Society Infectious Diseases in Livestock Enquiry.

He was elected a Fellow of the Royal Society in 1981 and delivered their Leeuwenhoek Lecture in 1993. He was awarded an OBE in 1999.

He died in Surrey in 2004. He had married Audrey Alice Doherty in 1948: they had two sons.
