= Antoinette Pirie =

English biochemist (1905–1991)

- Born: Antoinette Patey; 4 October 1905; London, England
- Died: 11 October 1991 (aged 86); Oxford, England
- Education: Newnham College, Cambridge
- Spouse: Norman Pirie
- Children: 2
- Scientific career
- Fields: Biochemistry
- Doctoral advisor: Sir Frederick Gowland Hopkins

Antoinette Pirie (née Patey; 4 October 1905 – 11 October 1991) was a British biochemist, and educator.

== Biography ==
Antoinette Patey was born in Bond Street, London. Her father was a botanist and pharmacist. She was educated at Wycombe Abbey School, and then achieved a first-class honours in natural sciences (biochemistry) from Newnham College, Cambridge in 1932. She completed her PhD at the biochemical laboratory in Cambridge under the professorship of Sir Frederick Gowland Hopkins. She married fellow biochemist Norman Pirie in 1931. They had a son and a daughter.

== Career ==
In 1939, for her postdoctoral work, Pirie joined a team at the Imperial Cancer Research Fund's Mill Hill laboratories, led by Ida Mann. The team investigated the effect of mustard gas on the cornea and tumor viruses. Pirie was dedicated to the study of the eye for the rest of her life.

In 1942, she accompanied Ida Mann to Oxford as her assistant at the formation of the Nuffield Laboratory of Ophthalmology at Oxford. Mann and Pirie researched the problems of ocular development, metabolism and toxicology. In 1946 they collaborated on The Science of Seeing. By 1947 Pirie succeeded Mann, as a Margaret Ogilvie Reader in Ophthalmology, and was elected to a professional fellowship at Somerville College, Oxford. At Oxford she worked with a team on unraveling major eye diseases by studying the biochemical processes of the eye. This led to discoveries with lens metabolism, enzymes, and lens proteins. Her findings accomplished important work on cataracts. Her work with cataracts started after collaborating with Ruth van Heyningen and exploring the biochemical changes in the cataracts of rabbits. Together they wrote, The Biochemistry of the Eye and organized a symposium in 1962 on "Lens Metabolism in Relation to Cataracts." Pirie would go on to establish the International Committee for Eye Research and become the first woman to receive the Proctor award in 1968.

After her retirement from Oxford in 1971, she went to India at the request of the Royal Commonwealth Society to investigate vitamin deficiencies in Tamil Nadu in Southern India. One of her main concerns was deficiencies of vitamin A causing xerophthalmia and leading to blindness in the Third World. She set up a nutrition center at Madurai, Tamil Nadu to identify vegetables seldom used but rich in vitamin A and encouraged gardening of these vegetables. Pirie established the Xerophthalmia Bulletin in 1972 and was also the editor and secretary. The bulletin comprised extracts from current scientific journals and original articles and comments. She relinquished the editorship in 1985.

Like her husband, she was an atheist and a passionate supporter of the Campaign for Nuclear Disarmament (CND). She became an expert on the radioactive hazards of nuclear explosions. Her husband was chairman of the CND scientific committee for several years. In 1957, in collaboration with nine working scientists – physicists, geneticists, physicians, and biologists, she edited Fallout to publicise the dangers which at that time the government was tending to minimize or conceal. Her scrupulous accuracy ensured that no criticism could be levelled at the book.

She died in Oxford, survived by her husband and two children.
