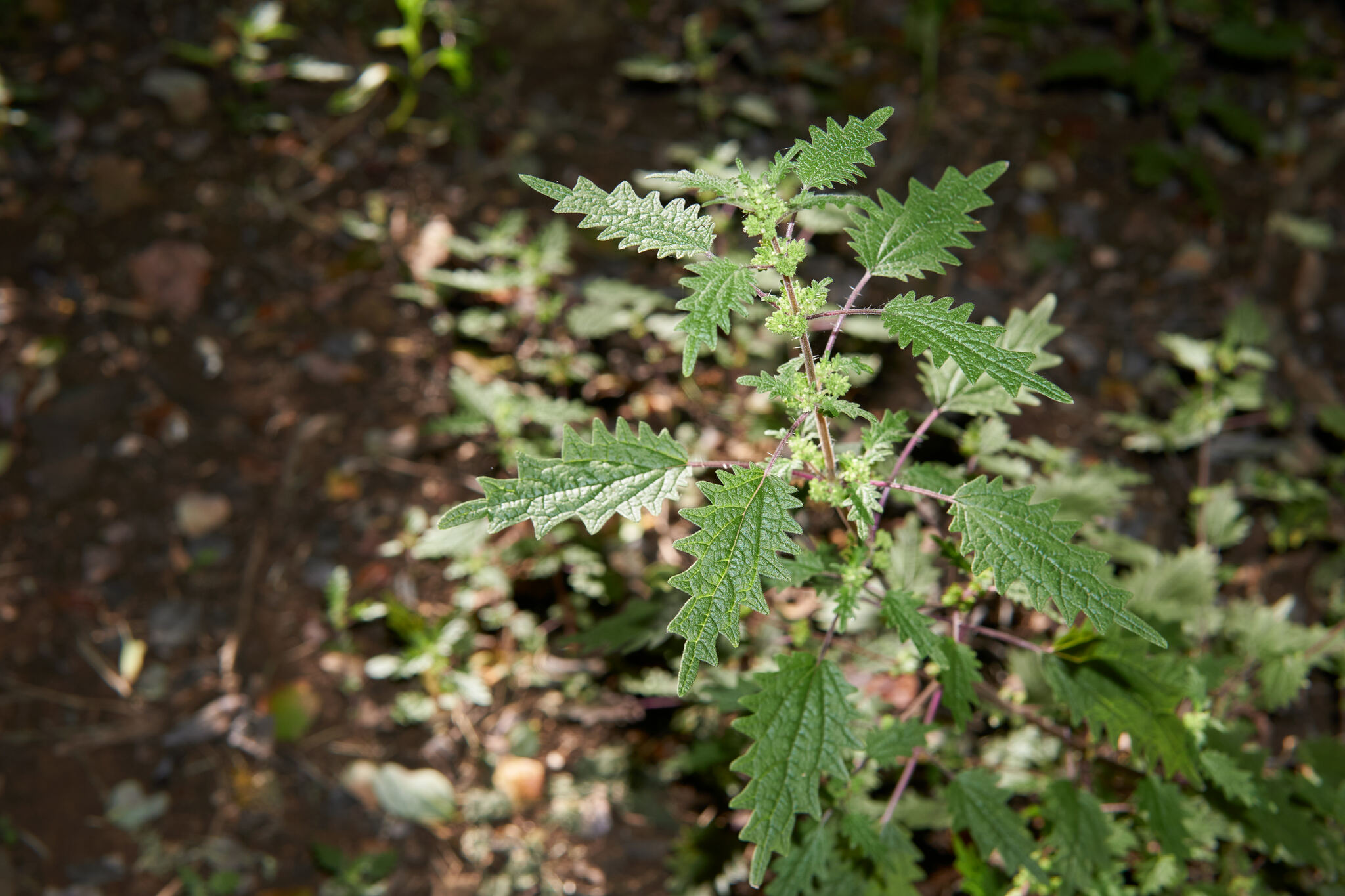

Conservation status
- Vulnerable (NatureServe)

Scientific classification
- Kingdom: Plantae
- Clade: Tracheophytes
- Clade: Angiosperms
- Clade: Eudicots
- Clade: Rosids
- Order: Rosales
- Family: Urticaceae
- Genus: Hesperocnide
- Species: H. sandwicensis

Binomial name
- Hesperocnide sandwicensis (Wedd.) Wedd.

= Hesperocnide sandwicensis =

Species of plant

Hesperocnide sandwicensis, the Hawai'i stingingnettle, is a rare species of nettle endemic to the island of Hawai'i. Less than 1000 plants from only 3 occurrences are estimated to exist due to grazing pressure from invasive sheep, goats, and pigs.

The closest relative of H. sandwicensis, and the only other species in the genus Hesperocnide, is the California endemic Hesperocnide tenella.

== Description ==
Hesperocnide sandwicensis is an annual nettle, growing 20–60 cm (7.9–23.6 in) tall. Leaves and stems are covered in small hairs, with leaves growing 1.5–7 cm (0.59–2.76 in) in length. Unlike other Hawaiian nettles which lost their ability to sting due to a lack of large herbivores, H. sandwicensis has retained this ability and its hairs can provide a painful sting if touched.

== Distribution and habitat ==
Hesperocnide sandwicensis grows only in the understory of subalpine dry forests on the volcanic slopes of Mauna Kea, Mauna Loa, and Hualālai on the big island of Hawai'i.
