= Duka =

- Location of Vas county in Hungary

- Location of Duka
- Coordinates: 47.12331°N 17.11313°E
- Country: Hungary
- County: Vas

Area
  - Total: 15.24 km^{2} (5.88 sq mi)

Population (2004)
  - Total: 265
  - Density: 17.38/km^{2} (45.0/sq mi)
- Time zone: UTC+1 (CET)
  - Summer (DST): UTC+2 (CEST)
- Postal code: 9556
- Area code: 95

Duka is a village in Vas County, Hungary.

== Notable people ==
The poet Judit Dukai Takách was born in Duka in 1795. Zádor György was born there in 1799. Others have even taken the name of their village as their surname.
