= John Rodney Guest =

British molecular microbiologist (born 1935)

John Rodney Guest, FRS (born 27 December 1935) is a British molecular microbiologist.

== Life and career ==
Guest was born the son of Sidney Ramsey Guest in Leeds, West Yorkshire and educated at the University of Leeds (B.Sc. 1957) and Trinity College, Oxford (Ph.D. 1961).

He worked as a Fellow at Oxford University from 1960 to 1965 and as a Fulbright Scholar at Stanford University in 1963–64. He was appointed Lecturer in Microbiology at the University of Sheffield from 1965 to 1968, Senior Lecturer and Reader from 1968 to 1981 and has been Professor of Microbiology at Sheffield since 1981.

Guest is known for his work on the application of mutant and genetic approaches to define the biochemistry and genetic make-up of central anabolic and catabolic pathways of bacteria, in particular the citric acid cycle and related functions in both aerobic and anaerobic metabolism.

In 1986 he was elected a Fellow of the Royal Society and delivered their Leeuwenhoek Lecture in 1995 on the subject of life without oxygen.

Guest married Barbara Dearsley in 1962 and had a son (Chris Guest; born 1968) and two daughters (Sue Guest; born 1963 and Julia Guest; born 1965).
