= William Hayes (geneticist) =

Irish geneticist (1913–1994)

William Hayes FRS
- Born: 18 January 1913; Rathfarnham, Co Dublin, Ireland
- Died: 7 January 1994 (aged 80); Sydney, New South Wales, Australia
- Education: St Columba's College (Rathfarnham), Trinity College Dublin
- Known for: The Genetics of Bacteria and their Viruses
- Awards: Leeuwenhoek Lecture, Macfarlane Burnet Medal and Lecture
- Scientific career
- Fields: Microbial genetics
- Institutions: Victoria Hospital, Blackpool; Sir Patrick Dun's Hospital, Dublin; Indian Army Medical Corps; Trinity College Dublin; California Institute of Technology; University of London; Australian National University, Canberra

William Hayes FRCPI FRS FRSE LLD (18 January 1913 – 7 January 1994) was an Irish geneticist.

== Early life ==
He was born in Rathfarnham, Co Dublin, the only son of William Hayes, a successful Dublin pharmacist, and his second wife, Miriam, née Harris. Hayes was still a child when his father died, and he lived with his mother and grandmother and was educated at home by a governess, before going to a preparatory school in Dalkey and then in 1927 to St Columba's College at Rathfarnham, where his early interest in science began to develop as a hobby. He read medicine at Trinity College Dublin, graduated BA in Natural Science in 1936 and qualified in medicine the following year (MB, BCh).

== Career ==
He completed internships at the Victoria Hospital, Blackpool and Sir Patrick Dun's Hospital, Dublin, before becoming an Assistant to his mentor, Professor J W Bigger, in the Department of Bacteriology at Trinity College. Here his work included routine diagnostic bacteriology and serology and studies of phase variation in Salmonella.

During WWII he was a Major in the Royal Army Medical Corps serving with the Indian Army Medical Corps. Here he began work on penicillin, wrote a book on penicillin therapy and published some of his work on Salmonella infection in the Army in India, which was the beginning of his active interest in bacterial genetics.

In 1947, Hayes returned to a Lectureship at Trinity College Dublin, where he continued his studies with Salmonella, developing his enthusiasm for bacterial genetics, and being awarded the DSc degree. In 1950 he then moved to a senior Lectureship in bacteriology at the University of London Postgraduate Medical School at Hammersmith and began work on bacterial mating. He developed the concept of a donor–recipient partnership with uni-directional transfer of genetic material. The importance of this discovery was quickly emphasised and widely recognised when he found that only a part of the genetic material was transferred from the donor strain (male) to the recipient. The announcement of these spectacular results at a meeting at Pallanza in 1952 firmly established Hayes internationally as a leader in his field.

In March 1964 he was elected a Fellow of the Royal Society and in 1965 delivered their Leeuwenhoek Lecture. He delivered the Bateson Lecture, at the John Innes symposium in 1972 on "Molecular genetics in retrospect".

After a sabbatical year at the California Institute of Technology he became the Director in 1957 of a new Medical Research Council Microbial Genetics Unit in Hammersmith. In 1968 the team moved to the newly formed Department of Molecular Biology at Edinburgh University.

In 1973, with the new Department at Edinburgh firmly established, Hayes accepted the Chair of Genetics at the Australian National University, Canberra, and went back to experimental work on Escherichia coli.

== Later life ==
He retired in 1978 and moved to Sydney, New South Wales, where he died in 1994. He had married Honora Lee in 1941; their son Michael is a medical professional.

He worked in an emeritus capacity in the Botany Department of the Australian National University for most of the 1980s, and was still living in Canberra in 1991.

== Honours and awards ==
- Fellow of the Royal College of Physicians of Ireland (1943)
- Fellow of the Royal Society of London (1964)
- Fellow of the Royal Society of Edinburgh (1968)
- Fellow of the Australian Academy of Science (1976)
- Fellowship of the Royal Postgraduate Medical School, University of London (1985)
- Honorary Degrees from the University of Leicester - (Doctor of Science 1968), University of Dublin - (Doctor of Laws 1970), University of Kent - (Doctor of Science 1973) and the National University of Ireland - (Doctor of Science 1973).
- Lectures included the Royal Society Leeuwenhoek Lecture (1965), the Genetical Society Mendel Lecture (1965), the first Griffith Memorial Lecture (1965) and the Macfarlane Burnet Medal and Lecture of the Australian Academy of Science (1977).

== Publications ==
- The Genetics of Bacteria and their Viruses, Blackwells, 1964.
