= Isidor Fankuchen =

American pioneer of crystallography

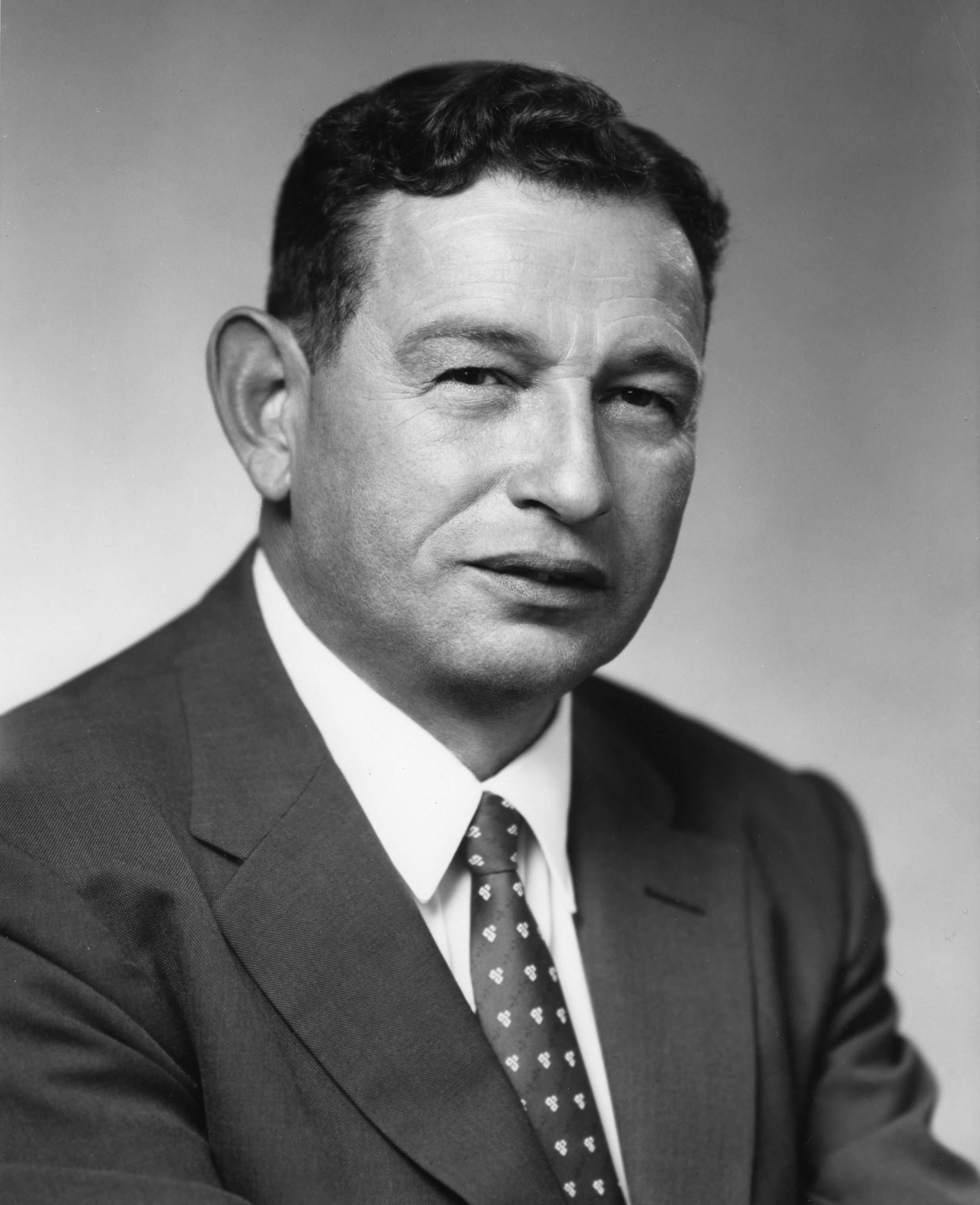
- Born: 19 July 1905; Brooklyn, New York
- Died: June 28, 1964 (aged 58)
- Education: Cooper Union; Cornell University; Birkbeck, University of London
- Scientific career
- Workplaces: Polytechnic Institute of Brooklyn

Isidor Fankuchen (July 19, 1905 – June 28, 1964) was an American pioneer of crystallography. Known to his friends as "Fan" he was from a Jewish family of Dutch origin and trained in Cornell and under W.L. Bragg and J.D. Bernal. He was one of the founders of the International Union of Crystallography (1945). His name has mistakenly been recorded also as Isadore van Kueken.

Fankuchen was born in Brooklyn in a family of modest means and went to Cooper Union where he received a BS in 1926. He then studied at Cornell with a Hecksher fellowship and received a PhD in 1933 after working under C.C. Murdock. He then went to Manchester University on a post-doctoral fellowship from the Schweinburg Foundation and worked with Sir Lawrence Bragg (1933–34) followed by two years at Birkbeck College with J.D. Bernal during which time they examined the structure of chymotrypsin and haemoglobin. He also collaborated with Bernal's student Dorothy Hodgkin (then Dorothy Crowfoot) in studying steroids. He then returned to the United States and worked on protein chemistry at the Massachusetts Institute of Technology. He then joined the Anderson Institute for Biological Research, Red Wing, Minnesota serving as an assistant director (1941–42). In 1941 he was elected a Fellow of the American Physical Society. From 1942 until his death in 1964 he was a faculty member at the Polytechnic Institute of Brooklyn. He was influential in training a generation of crystallographers and organized a monthly seminar group called the "Point Group". His courses produced so-called "Fan's two-week wonders" who learned crystallography and knew what could be done with it.

Fankuchen studied the structure of the tobacco mosaic virus (along with F. C. Bawden), the tomato bushy stunt virus, and fibres. His greatest influence was as a teacher. He edited the journal Acta Crystallographica from 1948. He died of cancer in Brooklyn.
