= Harry Smith (microbiologist) =

British microbiologist (1921–2011)

- Born: 7 August 1921
- Died: 10 December 2011 (aged 90)
- Awards: FRS; CBE
- Scientific career
- Workplaces: Porton Down; University of Birmingham

Harry Smith (7 August 1921 – 10 December 2011) was a British microbiologist, and Professor of Microbiology, at the University of Birmingham.

== Life ==
He was born in Northampton, the son of bookmaker Harry Smith, was educated at Northampton Grammar School and earned a degree in pharmacy at University College Nottingham in 1942. For the rest of the war he worked at Boots in Nottingham on the manufacture of pharmaceuticals, and was awarded a BSc in Chemistry by the University of London.

In 1945, he was appointed assistant professor at University College, where he was awarded a PhD in biochemistry for the successful conclusion of a research project. In 1947 he became a researcher at the Microbiological Research Establishment at Porton Down. There he carried out research on the mechanisms of anthrax infection using live animals and its possible applications in chemical warfare.

From 1965 to 1988, he was Chair of Microbiology at the University of Birmingham, subsequently becoming Emeritus Professor.

== Awards and honours ==
He was president of the Society for General Microbiology (now known as the Microbiology Society) and of the 14th International Congress of Microbiology.

In 1979 he was elected a Fellow of the Royal Society and in 1991 delivered the Leeuwenhoek Lecture on the subject of the influence of the host on microbes that cause disease.

In the 1993 Queen's Birthday Honours Smith was appointed a Commander of The Most Excellent Order of the British Empire (CBE) for services to the Ministry of Defence.

== Family ==
In 1947, Harry Smith married Janet Holmes; they had one son and one daughter.

== Memorial Lecture ==
A Memorial Lecture in Harry Smith's honour is associated with the Institute of Microbiology & Infection at the University of Birmingham and is given annually by a world-leading scientist or policymaker in the field of microbiology. Previous Harry Smith Memorial Lecturers include Dame Sally Davies, Professor David Holden, Professor Pascale Cossart, Arturo Casadevall, Liz Sockett, Mihai Netea, Bonnie Bassler, and Gordon Dougan.
