= Genetically modified plant =

Plants with human-introduced genes from other organisms

Genetically modified plants have been engineered for scientific research, to create new colours in plants, deliver vaccines, and to create enhanced crops. Plant genomes can be engineered by physical methods or by use of Agrobacterium for the delivery of sequences hosted in T-DNA binary vectors. Many plant cells are pluripotent, meaning that a single cell from a mature plant can be harvested and then under the right conditions form a new plant. This ability is most often taken advantage by genetic engineers through selecting cells that can successfully be transformed into an adult plant which can then be grown into multiple new plants containing transgene in every cell through a process known as tissue culture.

== Research ==
Much of the advances in the field of genetic engineering have come from experimentation with tobacco. Major advances in tissue culture and plant cellular mechanisms for a wide range of plants have originated from systems developed in tobacco. It was the first plant to be genetically engineered and is considered a model organism for not only genetic engineering, but a range of other fields. As such the transgenic tools and procedures are well established making it one of the easiest plants to transform. Another major model organism relevant to genetic engineering is Arabidopsis thaliana. Its small genome and short life cycle makes it easy to manipulate and it contains many homologs to important crop species. It was the first plant sequenced, has abundant bioinformatic resources and can be transformed by simply dipping a flower in a transformed Agrobacterium solution.

In research, plants are engineered to help discover the functions of certain genes. The simplest way to do this is to remove the gene and see what phenotype develops compared to the wild type form. Any differences are possibly the result of the missing gene. Unlike mutagenisis, genetic engineering allows targeted removal without disrupting other genes in the organism. Some genes are only expressed in certain tissue, so reporter genes, like GUS, can be attached to the gene of interest allowing visualisation of the location. Other ways to test a gene is to alter it slightly and then return it to the plant and see if it still has the same effect on phenotype. Other strategies include attaching the gene to a strong promoter and see what happens when it is over expressed, forcing a gene to be expressed in a different location or at different developmental stages.

== Ornamental ==
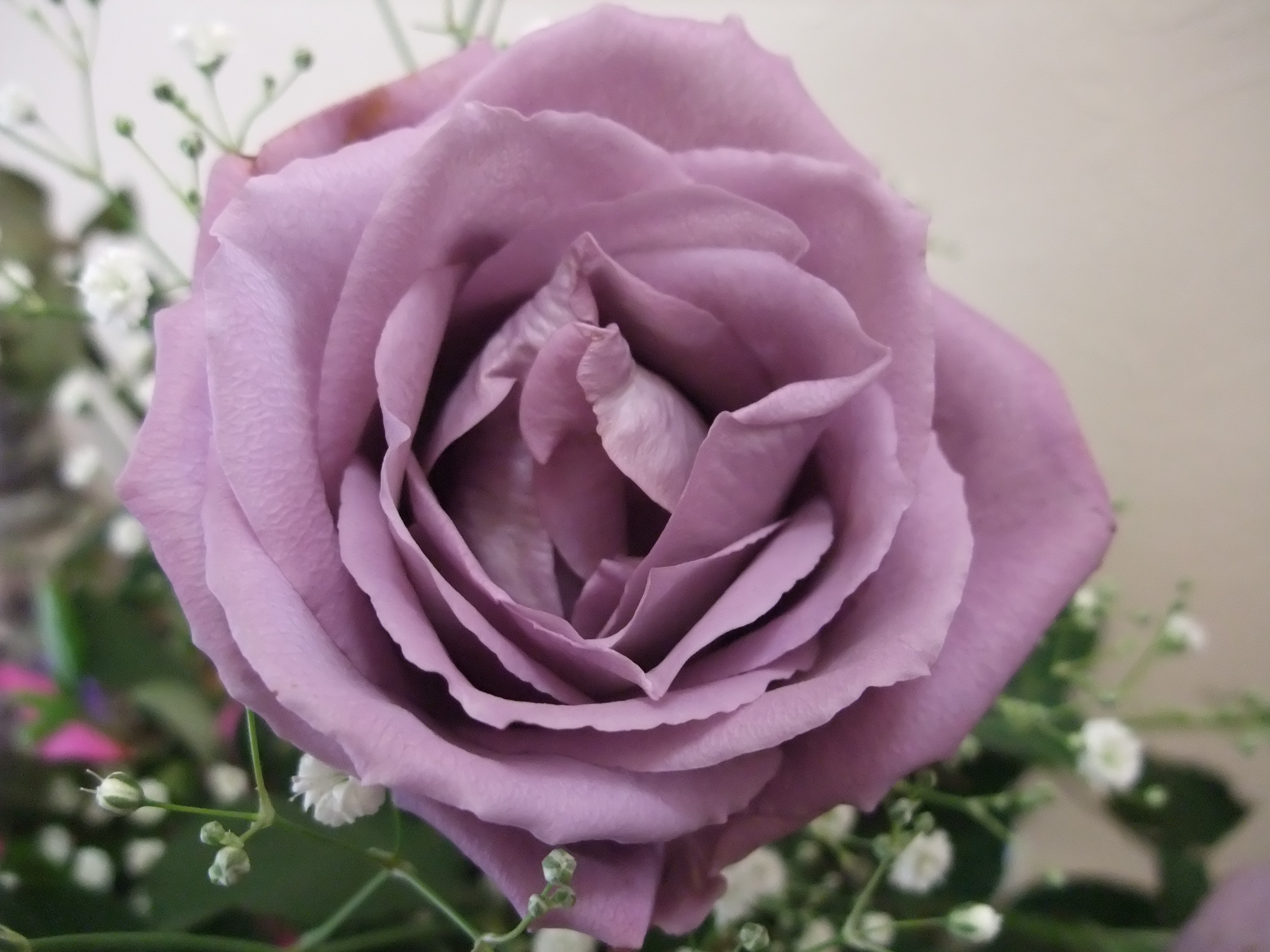
Suntory "blue" rose

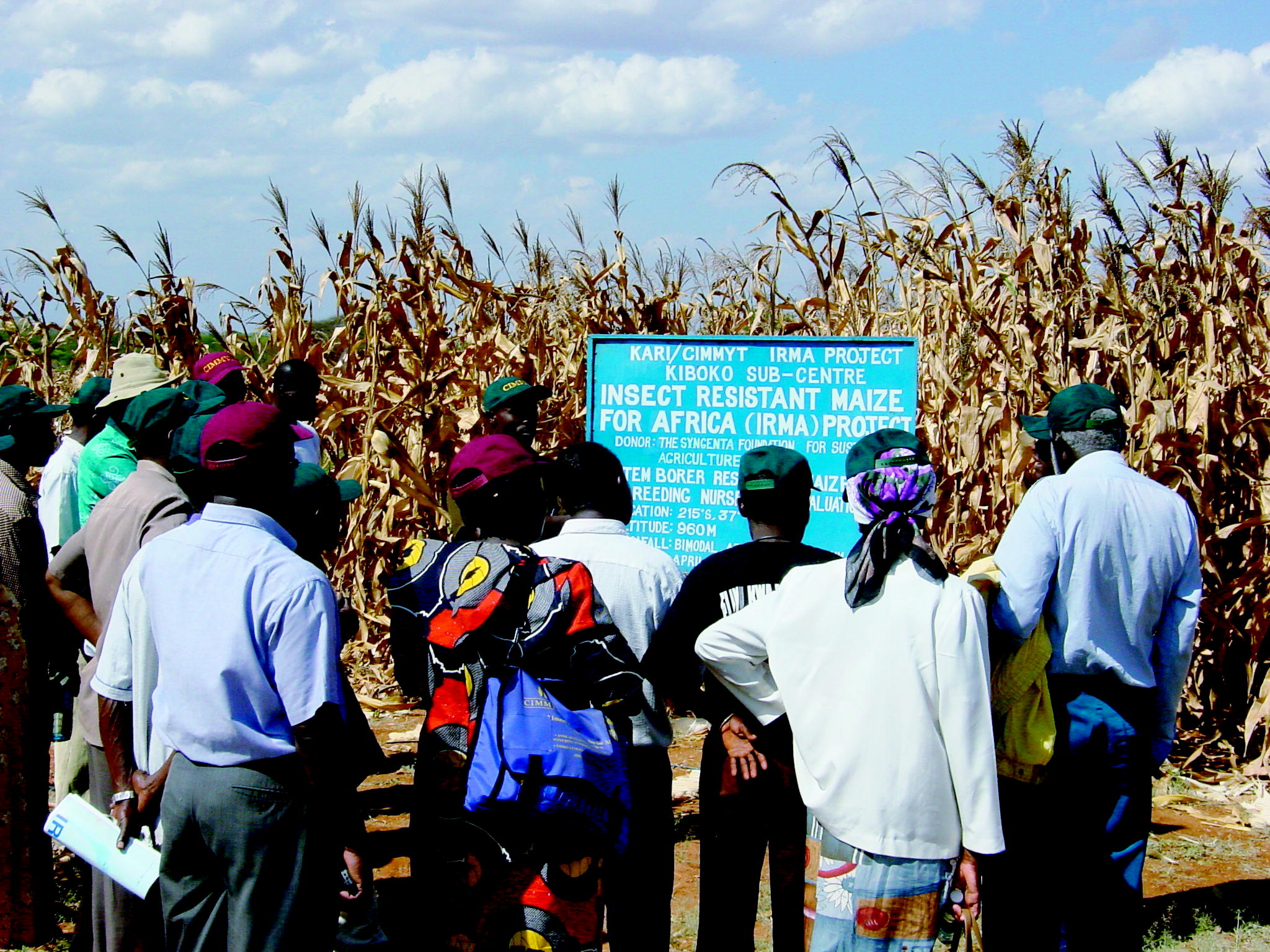
Kenyans examining insect-resistant transgenic Bt corn

Some genetically modified plants are purely ornamental. They are modified for flower color, fragrance, flower shape and plant architecture. The first genetically modified ornamentals commercialised altered colour. Carnations were released in 1997, with the most popular genetically modified organism, a blue rose (actually lavender or mauve) created in 2004. The roses are sold in Japan, the United States, and Canada. Other genetically modified ornamentals include Chrysanthemum and Petunia. As well as increasing aesthetic value there are plans to develop ornamentals that use less water or are resistant to the cold, which would allow them to be grown outside their natural environments.

== Conservation ==
It has been proposed to genetically modify some plant species threatened by extinction to be resistant invasive plants and diseases, such as the emerald ash borer in North American and the fungal disease, Ceratocystis platani, in European plane trees. The papaya ringspot virus (PRSV) devastated papaya trees in Hawaii in the twentieth century until transgenic papaya plants were given pathogen-derived resistance. However, genetic modification for conservation in plants remains mainly speculative. A unique concern is that a transgenic species may no longer bear enough resemblance to the original species to truly claim that the original species is being conserved. Instead, the transgenic species may be genetically different enough to be considered a new species, thus diminishing the conservation worth of genetic modification.

== Crops ==
Genetically modified crops are genetically modified plants that are used in agriculture. The first crops provided are used for animal or human food and provide resistance to certain pests, diseases, environmental conditions, spoilage or chemical treatments (e.g. resistance to a herbicide). The second generation of crops aimed to improve the quality, often by altering the nutrient profile. Third generation genetically modified crops can be used for non-food purposes, including the production of pharmaceutical agents, biofuels, and other industrially useful goods, as well as for bioremediation.

There are three main aims to agricultural advancement; increased production, improved conditions for agricultural workers and sustainability. GM crops contribute by improving harvests through reducing insect pressure, increasing nutrient value and tolerating different abiotic stresses. Despite this potential, as of 2018, the commercialised crops are limited mostly to cash crops like cotton, soybean, maize and canola and the vast majority of the introduced traits provide either herbicide tolerance or insect resistance. Soybeans accounted for half of all genetically modified crops planted in 2014. Adoption by farmers has been rapid, between 1996 and 2013, the total surface area of land cultivated with GM crops increased by a factor of 100, from 17,000 square kilometers (4,200,000 acres) to 1,750,000 km^{2} (432 million acres). Geographically though the spread has been very uneven, with strong growth in the Americas and parts of Asia and little in Europe and Africa. Its socioeconomic spread has been more even, with approximately 54% of worldwide GM crops grown in developing countries in 2013.

=== Food ===
The majority of GM crops have been modified to be resistant to selected herbicides, usually a glyphosate or glufosinate based one. Genetically modified crops engineered to resist herbicides are now more available than conventionally bred resistant varieties; in the USA 93% of soybeans and most of the GM maize grown is glyphosate tolerant. Most currently available genes used to engineer insect resistance come from the Bacillus thuringiensis bacterium. Most are in the form of delta endotoxin genes known as cry proteins, while a few use the genes that encode for vegetative insecticidal proteins. The only gene commercially used to provide insect protection that does not originate from B. thuringiensis is the Cowpea trypsin inhibitor (CpTI). CpTI was first approved for use cotton in 1999 and is currently undergoing trials in rice. Less than one percent of GM crops contained other traits, which include providing virus resistance, delaying senescence, modifying flower colour and altering the plants composition. Golden rice is the most well known GM crop that is aimed at increasing nutrient value. It has been engineered with three genes that biosynthesise beta-carotene, a precursor of vitamin A, in the edible parts of rice. It is intended to produce a fortified food to be grown and consumed in areas with a shortage of dietary vitamin A. a deficiency which each year is estimated to kill 670,000 children under the age of 5 and cause an additional 500,000 cases of irreversible childhood blindness. The original golden rice produced 1.6μg/g of the carotenoids, with further development increasing this 23 times. In 2018 it gained its first approvals for use as food.

=== Biopharmaceuticals ===
Plants and plant cells have been genetically engineered for production of biopharmaceuticals in bioreactors, a process known as Pharming. Work has been done with duckweed Lemna minor, the algae Chlamydomonas reinhardtii and the moss Physcomitrella patens. Biopharmaceuticals produced include cytokines, hormones, antibodies, enzymes and vaccines, most of which are accumulated in the plant seeds. Many drugs also contain natural plant ingredients and the pathways that lead to their production have been genetically altered or transferred to other plant species to produce greater volume and better products. Other options for bioreactors are biopolymers and biofuels. Unlike bacteria, plants can modify the proteins post-translationally, allowing them to make more complex molecules. They also pose less risk of being contaminated. Therapeutics have been cultured in transgenic carrot and tobacco cells, including a drug treatment for Gaucher's disease.

=== Vaccines ===
Vaccine production and storage has great potential in transgenic plants. Vaccines are expensive to produce, transport and administer, so having a system that could produce them locally would allow greater access to poorer and developing areas. As well as purifying vaccines expressed in plants, it is also possible to produce edible vaccines in plants. Edible vaccines stimulate the immune system when ingested to protect against certain diseases. Being stored in plants reduces the long-term cost as they can be disseminated without the need for cold storage, do not need to be purified, and have long term stability. Also being housed within plant cells provides some protection from the gut acids upon digestion; the cost of developing, regulating and containing transgenic plants is high, leading to most current plant-based vaccine development being applied to veterinary medicine, where the controls are not as strict.
