= Thomas Stevenson (toxicologist) =

English toxicologist and forensic chemist

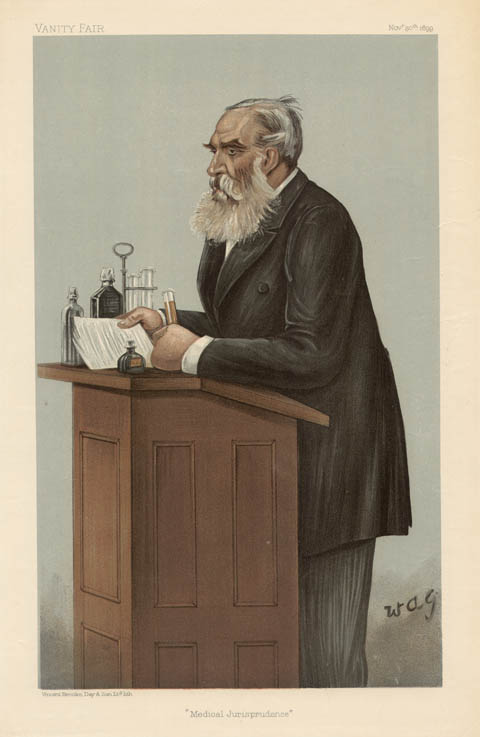
- "Medical Jurisprudence"; Stevenson as caricatured by A. G. Witherby in Vanity Fair, November 1899
- Born: 14 April 1838; Rainton, Yorkshire, England
- Died: 27 July 1908 (aged 70); Streatham, London, England
- Education: University of London; Guy's Hospital
- Scientific career
- Fields: Toxicologist
- Workplaces: Home Office; Guy's Hospital
- Academic advisors: Mr Steel of Bradford
- Notable students: Frederick Hopkins

Thomas Stevenson (1838 – 27 July 1908) was an English toxicologist and forensic chemist. He served as an analyst to the Home Office and in England he served as an expert witness in many famous poisoning cases. These included the Pimlico Mystery, The Maybrick Case, the Lambeth Poisoner, and the George Chapman case.

In 1857 Stevenson became a medical pupil to Mr Steel of Bradford. He entered Guy's Hospital Medical School in 1859 and graduated MB, London, in 1863 and M.D. in 1864. He won several gold medals whilst a student. He became MRCP in 1864 and FRCP in 1871. Stevenson became demonstrator in practical chemistry at Guy's in 1864, and was lecturer in chemistry, 1870–98, and in forensic medicine, 1878–1908, in succession to Alfred Swaine Taylor (1806–80). He also served as the President of the Institute of Chemistry and of the Society of Public Analysts.

He is notable as the scientific mentor of the Nobel Prize winner Frederick Hopkins.

Stevenson died of diabetes on 27 July 1908 at his home in Streatham High Road, London and was buried at West Norwood Cemetery. He was a man of deep Christian faith, as was his wife, Agnes. All their seven children followed in their parents footsteps. Mabel trained as doctor and became a medical missionary in India before returning home and becoming a nun at the House of the Epiphany in Truro; another daughter, Alice later joined this order too as a nun.

The British Medical Journal obituary, besides detailing his notable career, noted his Christian faith and service:

‘He was a diligent student of the Bible; indeed, his character and life were the direct result of his constant and abiding faith in God, every act being simply and solely done for His glory.’

== Sources ==
- Dictionary of National Biography, Smith, Elder & Co., 1908–1986, 1901–1911, pp. 414–415
- Oxford Dictionary of National Biography by H. D. Rolleston, rev. N. G. Coley, Oxford University Press, 2004; online edn, Oct 2005
- A Treatise on Hygiene and Public Health Volume 1 edited by Thomas Stevenson and Shirley Murphy (1892) J. and A. Churchill.
