= Michael Ferguson (biochemist) =

British biochemist

Sir Michael Ferguson CBE FRS FRSE FMedSci
- Born: Michael Anthony John Ferguson; February 1957 (age 69); County Durham, England
- Known for: research into neglected tropical diseases
- Awards: Fellow of the Royal Society of Edinburgh (1994); Fellow of the Royal Society (2000); Fellow of the Academy of Medical Sciences (2007); Commander of the Order of the British Empire (CBE) (2008); Knight Bachelor (2019)
- Scientific career
- Workplaces: University of Dundee
- Website: http://www.lifesci.dundee.ac.uk/people/mike-ferguson

Sir Michael Anthony John Ferguson (born February 1957) is a British biochemist and Regius Professor of Life Sciences at the University of Dundee. His research team are based at the School of Life Sciences, University of Dundee.

== Career ==
After education at St Peter's School, York, he received a BSc degree in biochemistry from the University of Manchester Institute of Science and Technology in 1979 and a PhD degree in biochemistry by London University in 1982.

He was a postdoctoral fellow at the Rockefeller University, New York (1982–85) and at Oxford University (1985–88). He then accepted a lectureship at the University of Dundee and was promoted to Professor of Molecular Parasitology in 1994. He became Dean of Research for the School of Life Sciences at the University of Dundee in 2007, a position he held until 2014. He was a member of the board of governors of the Wellcome Trust (2012–2021), also serving as Deputy Chair (2018–2021).

He is a member of the board of directors of the Medicines for Malaria Venture.

== Honours and awards ==
- 1991: awarded Colworth Medal by the Biochemical Society to "the most promising young biochemist under 35"
- 1993-98: Howard Hughes International Research Scholarship
- 1994: elected a Fellow of the Royal Society of Edinburgh (FRSE)
- 1996: awarded Makdougall Brisbane Prize of the Royal Society of Edinburgh for "particular distinction in the promotion of scientific research".
- 1999: International Glycoconjugate Organisation Award. A biennial award made to "a scientist who has clearly advanced the field of glycoscience and shows promise of continuing advancements".
- 1999: elected a member of The European Molecular Biology Organisation).
- 2000: elected a Fellow of the Royal Society (FRS, London).
- 2006: awarded the C.A. Wright Medal of the British Society for Parasitology.
- 2007: elected a Fellow of the Academy of Medical Sciences (FMedSci)
- 2008: appointed a Commander of the Order of the British Empire (CBE) for services to science in the 2008 New Year Honours.
- 2012: appointed a member of the Board of Governors of The Wellcome Trust
- 2013: appointed Regius Professor of Life Sciences
- 2019: invested a Knight Bachelor for services to science in the 2019 New Year Honours.
- 2025: awarded the Leeuwenhoek Prize by the Royal Society
