= George Pirie (artist) =

Scottish artist (1863–1946)

Sir George Pirie PRSA (5 December 1863 – 17 February 1946) was a Scottish artist who was associated with the Glasgow Boys in the 1880s, though he was not in much sympathy with the theories of these artists.

He was born in Campbeltown, Argyllshire, on 5 December 1863. His father was John Pirie, a physician and surgeon, and his mother was Jane Harvey. As a child the family moved to Glasgow, where his father was a popular and well-known physician. He was educated at Glasgow Academy and graduated M.A. at Glasgow University in 1882. He studied at Glasgow School of Art, the Slade School, and the Académie Julian in Paris under Gustave Boulanger, Jules Lefebvre, and Emmanuel Frémiet the sculptor.

He painted animals and birds, as well as some landscapes. In the early 1890s he was in Texas for a period, drawing horses and ranching scenes. He exhibited widely, including at the Royal Academy as well as in Scotland and the provinces.

He served as President of the Royal Scottish Academy from 1933 to 1944 and was knighted in 1937.

In 1901 he had married Jean Wingate in Glasgow with whom he had two sons and a daughter. The family lived in a large isolated house (Wardend) in Torrance with enough space for all of them to pursue their own interests. The younger son was the biochemist Norman Wingate Pirie. He was knighted in 1937, and died in Torrance on 17 February 1946, aged 82.
