= EUginius =

Online database application for genetically modified organisms

EUginius is an Internet-based database application for genetically modified organisms (GMOs). The name EUginius is an acronym and stands for EUropean GMO Initiative for a Unified Database System.

== Development and commissioning ==
The EUginius database was created on the initiative of the German Federal Office of Consumer Protection and Food Safety (BVL) and the Dutch research Institute Wageningen Food Safety Research (WFSR, formerly RIKILT). Building on parallel preparatory work by both cooperation partners, EUginius has been jointly developed and maintained since 2010, and has been online since October 2014. The information is provided in English.

== Goal ==
EUginius aims to assist competent authorities as well as interested private users in finding accurate information on the presence, detection and identification of GMOs. Data on the GMOs’ molecular characterisation and traits, detection methods, reference materials, and authorisation status (currently limited to the EU) are provided. EUginius is tax-financed and therefore offers its information on the GMOs freely accessible. Information on releases carried out and their geographical location are not provided in EUginius.

== Types of organisms present in EUginius ==
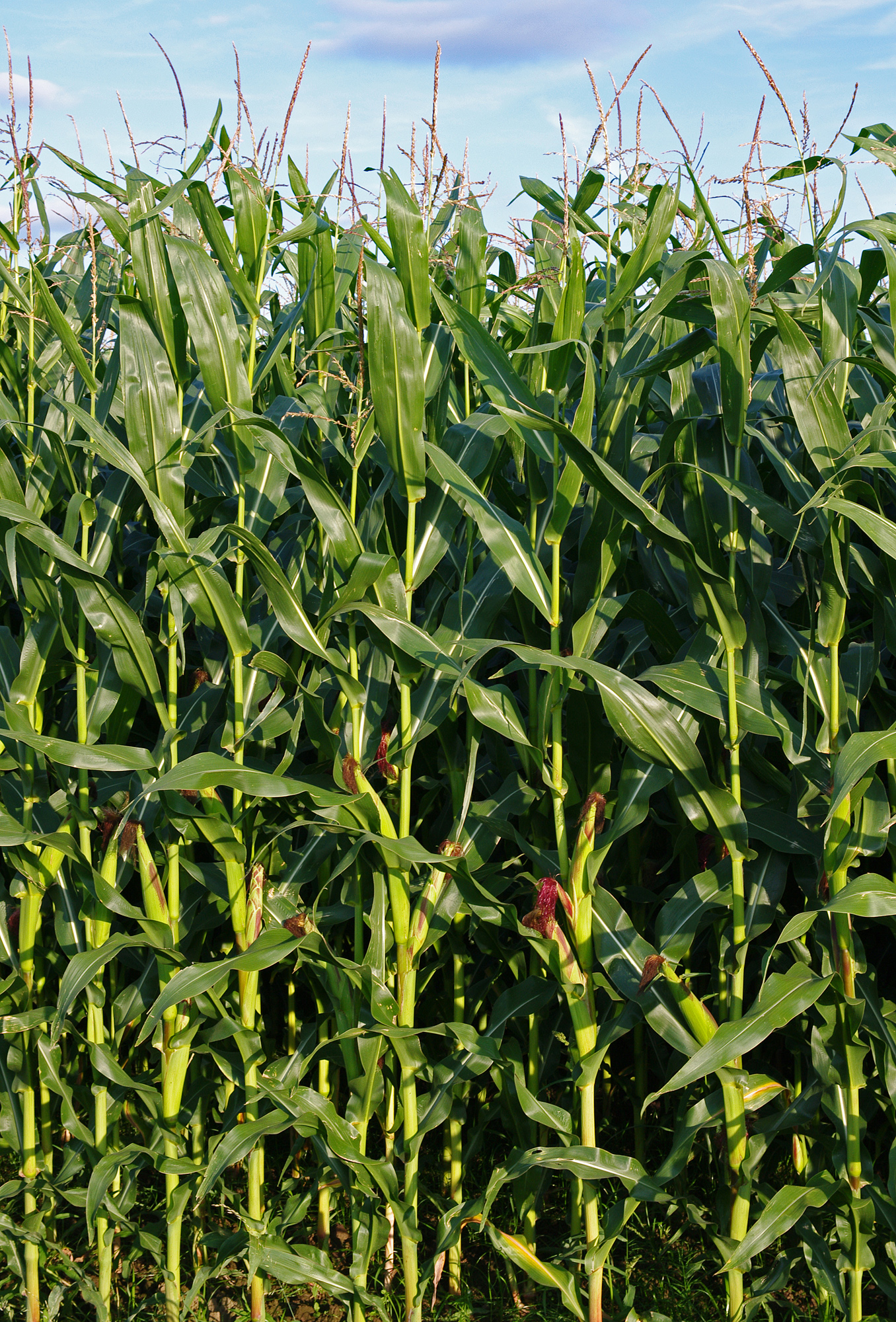
Cornfield (Zea mays subsp. mays))

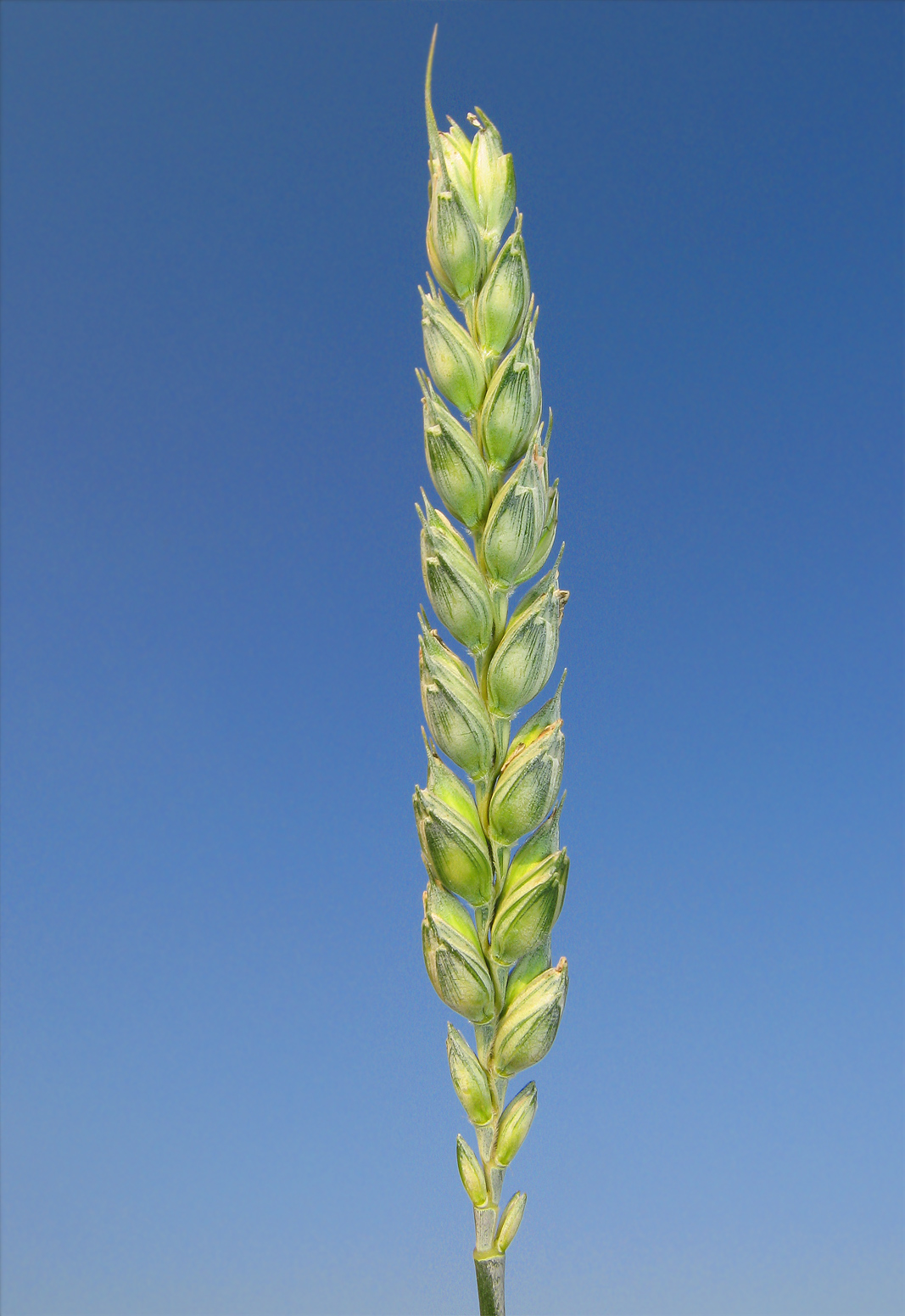
Wheat ear

Most of the GMOs present in EUginius are used for genetically modified food and feed, the majority plants (e.g. pest resistant Bt maize, Golden rice with enhanced synthesis of β-carotene), and thus come from the field of green biotechnology. There is also information on genetically modified animals. EUginius provides for example information on a fast-growing genetically modified salmon (AquAdvantage) as well as information on genetically modified insects that have been developed to combat vectors of pathogens (e.g. Aedes aegypti OX5034, used to reduce the yellow fever mosquito population). In addition, in some cases, information is provided for the detection of genetically modified microbial production strains of food or feed additives (white biotechnology).

Since the European Union classifies organisms developed using New Breeding Techniques (NBTs) as GMOs, EUginius provides information about commercialised NBT-organisms, including genome edited organisms such as the high-oleic soybean, the larger growing pufferfish or pig resistant to porcine reproductive and respiratory syndrome virus (PRRS-virus). Furthermore, EUginius lists, to some extent, published NGT organisms which present market-relevant traits.

== Data in EUginius ==
As of March 2026, EUginius contains

- 1058 genetically modified organisms (detailed information on GMOs)
- 288 PCR-detection methods (methods for detection and identification of GMOs)
- 496 reference materials (non-certified and certified reference materials)

== Server locations and service ==
The database and web servers are located in Germany. Further development and troubleshooting are decided jointly by the cooperation partners.

== Partnerships ==
Since 2018, there have also been partnerships with the Institute of Plant Breeding and Acclimatization (Instytut Hodowli i Aklimatyzacji Roślin – IHAR, based in Blonie, Poland), the Austrian Agency for Health and Food Safety (AGES, based in Vienna, Austria) and the Experimental ZooProphylactic Institute of Lazio and Tuscany (Istituto Zooprofilattico Sperimentale – IZS, based in Rome, Italy).

Beyond that, EUginius uses the element thesaurus GMO-GET (GMO Genetic Element Thesaurus) developed in collaboration with the Biosafety Clearing House (BCH, Montreal, Canada).

== Outlook ==
EUginius is continuously maintained and further developed. In this way, the work of the control laboratories using EUginius is supported in a timely manner. The adaptation of the contents and their provision (e.g. information on organisms developed by NBTs and sequencing information) is carried out on an ongoing basis. An update of the module for accessing GMO authorisation applications was released in 2023.
