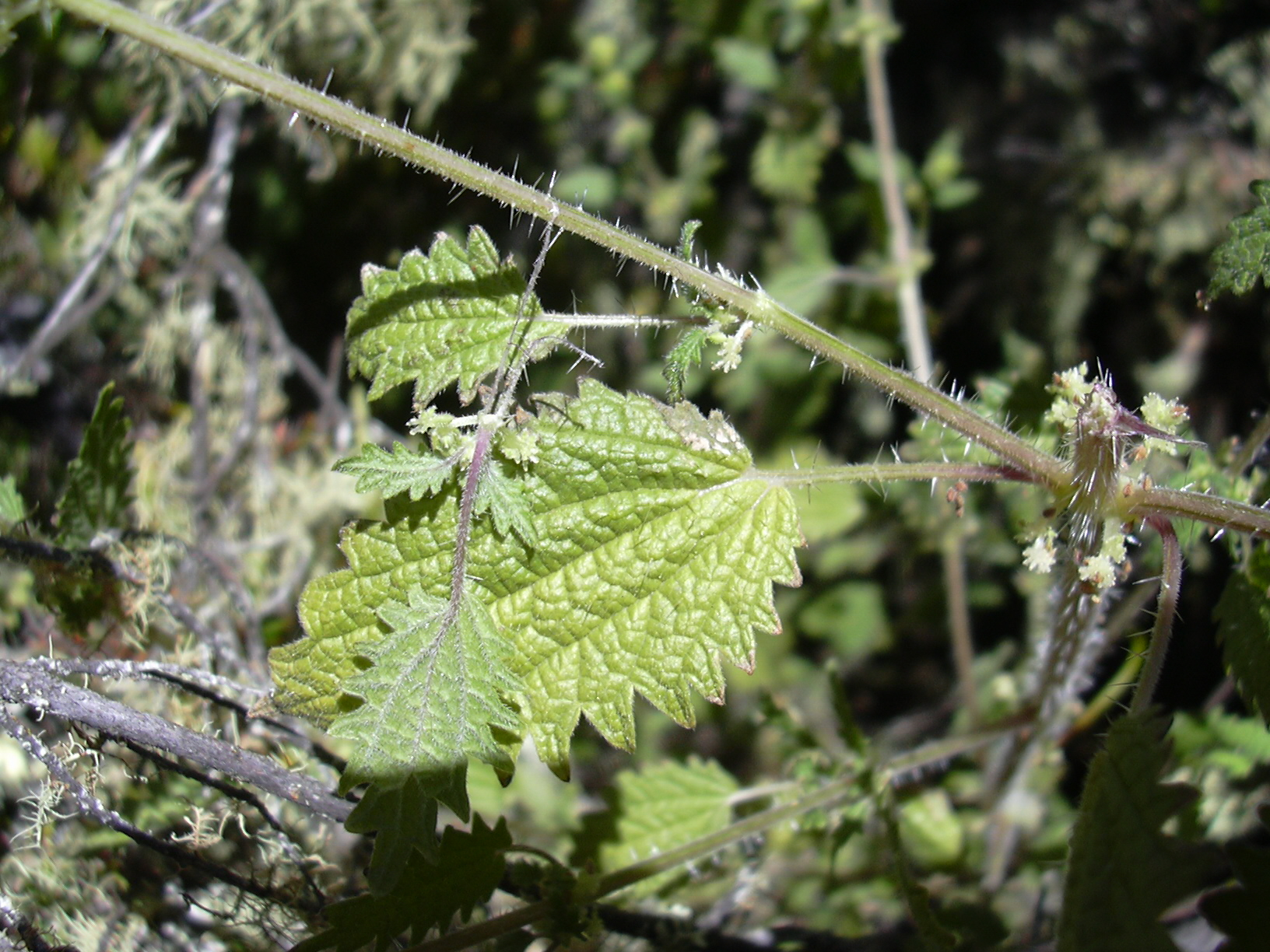
- Hesperocnide sandwicensis

Scientific classification
- Kingdom: Plantae
- Clade: Tracheophytes
- Clade: Angiosperms
- Clade: Eudicots
- Clade: Rosids
- Order: Rosales
- Family: Urticaceae
- Tribe: Urticeae
- Genus: Hesperocnide; Torr.

= Hesperocnide =

Genus of flowering plants

Hesperocnide is a small genus of nettles containing two species. These are annual herbs covered in stinging hairs and toothed leaves.

- Hesperocnide sandwicensis (Wedd.) Wedd., the Hawaii nettle, is endemic to Hawaii.
- Hesperocnide tenella Torr., the western nettle, is native to California and Baja California.
