= Judit Dukai Takách =

Hungarian poet

- Dukai Takács Judit
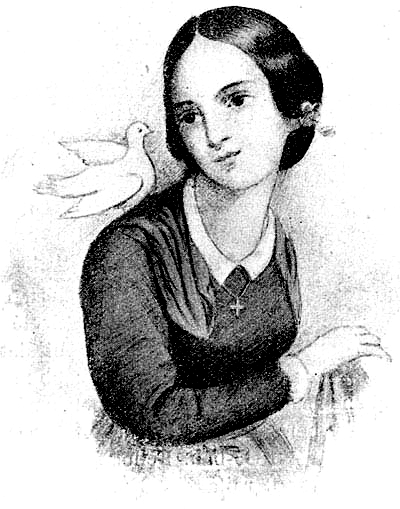
- Born: Duka, Vas County
- Died: Sopron
- Writing career
- Pen name: Malvina
- Language: Hungarian
- Genre: Poetry

Judit Dukai Takách (1795–1836) was a Hungarian poet. She was known by her pseudonym, Malvina.
