= Frederick Gowland Hopkins =

English biochemist (1861–1947)

Sir Frederick Gowland Hopkins OM FRS
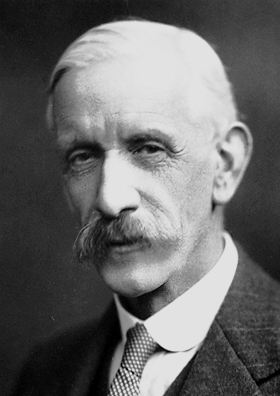
- Born: 20 June 1861; Eastbourne, East Sussex, England
- Died: 16 May 1947 (aged 85); Cambridge, England
- Resting place: Parish of the Ascension Burial Ground, Cambridge
- Education: Guy's Hospital Medical School
- Known for: Vitamins, tryptophan, glutathione
- Spouse: Jessie Anne Stephens
- Children: 3, including Jacquetta Hawkes
- Relatives: J. B. Priestley (son-in-law)
- Awards: Royal Medal (1918); Cameron Prize for Therapeutics of the University of Edinburgh (1922); Copley Medal (1926); Nobel Prize (1929); Albert Medal (1934); Order of Merit (1935)
- Scientific career
- Fields: Biochemistry
- Workplaces: University of Cambridge
- Academic advisors: Thomas Stevenson; Sir Michael Foster
- Doctoral students: Judah Hirsch Quastel; Malcolm Dixon; Antoinette Pirie
- Other notable students: J.B.S. Haldane; Albert Szent-Györgyi, Joseph Needham

Sir Frederick Gowland Hopkins OM FRS (20 June 1861 – 16 May 1947) was an English biochemist who was awarded the Nobel Prize in Physiology or Medicine in 1929, with Christiaan Eijkman, for the discovery of vitamins. He also discovered the amino acid tryptophan, in 1901. He was President of the Royal Society from 1930 to 1935.

== Education and early life ==
Hopkins was born in Eastbourne, Sussex, and initially attended the City of London School. However, he soon transferred to Alexandra Park College in Hornsey and completed his further study with the University of London External Programme (through evening classes at Birkbeck College). He attended the medical school of Guy's Hospital, which is now part of King's College London School of Medicine.

== Career and research ==
After graduating, Hopkins then taught physiology and toxicology at Guy's Hospital from 1894 to 1898. In 1898, while attending a meeting of the Physiological Society, he was invited by Sir Michael Foster to join the Physiological Laboratory in Cambridge to investigate the chemical aspects of physiology. Biochemistry was not, at that time, recognised as a separate branch of science. He was a lecturer in chemical physiology at Emmanuel College, Cambridge in March 1900, when he received the academic rank Master of Arts (MA) honoris causa. He earned a doctorate in physiology (D.Sc.) from the University of London in July 1902, and at the same time was given a readership in biochemistry at Trinity College. While at Cambridge he was initiated into Freemasonry. In 1910 he became a Fellow of Trinity College, and an Honorary Fellow of Emmanuel College. In 1914 he was elected to the Chair of Biochemistry at Cambridge University, thus becoming the first Professor in that discipline at Cambridge. His Cambridge students included neurochemistry pioneer Judah Hirsch Quastel and pioneer embryologist Joseph Needham.

Hopkins had for a long time studied how cells obtain energy via a complex metabolic process of oxidation and reduction reactions. His study in 1907 with Sir Walter Morley Fletcher of the connection between lactic acid and muscle contraction was one of the central achievements of his work on the biochemistry of the cell. He and Fletcher showed that oxygen depletion causes an accumulation of lactic acid in the muscle. Their work paved the way for the later discovery by Archibald Hill and Otto Fritz Meyerhof that a carbohydrate metabolic cycle supplies the energy used for muscle contraction.

In 1912 Hopkins published the work for which he is best known, demonstrating in a series of animal feeding experiments that diets consisting of pure proteins, carbohydrates, fats, minerals, and water fail to support animal growth. This led him to suggest the existence in normal diets of tiny quantities of as yet unidentified substances that are essential for animal growth and survival. These hypothetical substances he called "accessory food factors", later renamed vitamins. It was this work that led his being awarded (together with Christiaan Eijkman) the 1929 Nobel Prize in Physiology or Medicine.

During World War I, Hopkins continued his work on the nutritional value of vitamins. His efforts were especially valuable in a time of food shortages and rationing. He agreed to study the nutritional value of margarine and found that it was, as suspected, inferior to butter because it lacked the vitamins A and D. As a result of his work, vitamin-enriched margarine was introduced in 1926.

Hopkins is credited with the discovery and characterisation in 1921 of glutathione extracted from various animal tissues. At the time he proposed that the compound was a dipeptide of glutamic acid and cysteine. The structure was controversial for many years but in 1929 he concluded that it was a tripeptide of glutamic acid, cysteine and glycine. This conclusion agreed with that from the independent work of Edward Calvin Kendall.

== Awards and honours ==
Hopkins was elected a Foreign Associate of the National Academy of Sciences (USA) in 1924. During his life, in addition to the Nobel Prize, Hopkins was awarded the Royal Medal of the Royal Society in 1918, the Cameron Prize for Therapeutics of the University of Edinburgh in 1922, and the Copley Medal of the Royal Society in 1926.

Other significant honours were his election in 1905 as a Fellow of the Royal Society (FRS), Great Britain's most prestigious scientific organisation; his knighthood by King George V in 1925; and the award in 1935 of the Order of Merit, Great Britain's most exclusive civilian honour.

From 1930 to 1935, he served as president of the Royal Society and, in 1933, served as president of the British Association for the Advancement of Science. He was elected to the American Philosophical Society in 1937.

== Personal life ==
In 1898, he married Jessie Anne Stephens (1861–1937); they had one son and two daughters, the younger of whom, Jacquetta Hawkes, became a prominent archaeologist and married the author J. B. Priestley.

Gowland Hopkins died on 16 May 1947 in Cambridge and is buried at the Parish of the Ascension Burial Ground in Cambridge, with his wife.

== See also ==
- List of presidents of the Royal Society

Professional and academic associations
Preceded by Ernest Rutherford	45th President of the Royal Society; 1930–1935	Succeeded by William Henry Bragg
