= Frederick Charles Bawden =

English plant pathologist and virologist

- Bawden in 1967
- Born: 18 August 1908
- Died: 8 February 1972 (aged 63)
- Occupation: Virologist, botanist

Sir Frederic Charles Bawden FRS (18 August 1908 – 8 February 1972) was an English plant pathologist and virologist who worked at Rothamsted Experimental Station from 1936 and served as a director from 1958 until his death.

Bawden was born in North Tawton, Devonshire to George and Ellen Balment. His father was a registrar of births and deaths and moved to Okehampton where he became master of the Poor Law Institution. It was here that Bawden became interested in the cultivation of potatoes. The headmaster at Okehampton Grammar School, W. Hunter, made him interested in botany early in life. After studies there and at Crediton Grammar School, he joined Emmanuel College, Cambridge. He studied cereal rusts under Frederick T. Brooks and received an MA in 1930. He worked from 1930 at the Potato Virus Research Station under Kenneth M. Smith and Redcliffe Salaman. Along with Norman W. Pirie, he worked on the crystallization of viruses. In 1936 he joined Rothamsted Experimental Station and continued to work on viruses. Bawden and Pirie demonstrated RNA as the nucleic acid of several viruses in 1936.

Bawden was elected to the Royal Society in 1949 and received a medal from the Royal Agricultural Society in 1955. He was knighted in 1967.

Bawden married Marjorie Elizabeth Cudmore, with whom he went to school at Okehampton and at Cambridge university, in 1934. They had two sons.
