= Plant manufactured pharmaceuticals =

Plant manufactured Pharmaceuticals are pharmaceuticals derived from genetically modified plants used as therapeutic compounds. This can be used as the replacement for the traditional method of inoculating animals for Cell Culture production. We can use plants to cure and prevent diseases that may have once been deemed incurable. Through biotechnological advancements, we are able to produce complex therapeutic proteins from plant cells. Such Therapeutic Proteins are seen in brands like Enevrel and Remicade for rheumatoid arthritis, Herceptin, a breast cancer treatment. Plants like tobacco are hosts for protein production for applications such as; anemia, hepatitis C & B, hypertension, antimicrobial, and liver disease.

== Impact on business and industry ==
With the advancement of Plant Manufactured Pharmaceuticals, comes the advancements of a new type production in industry. Companies such as ZEA Biosciences are developing cost-effective and scalable pharmaceutical ingredients using plants instead of cell culture. Unlike cell culture, plants can have a much larger production capacity, a mass quantity of plant hosts on site, and the ability to make specific antibodies that is used as a bio-reactor for specific patient needs. Indirectly, the need to grow plants that are being used as Plant Manufactured Pharmaceuticals will increase in geographic areas where certain plants naturally grow, for instance in developing countries. Increasing the need for agricultural societies in developing countries will help certain countries to export and make trade alliance with other countries and with the development of the therapies that can control diseases like Cholera and HIV/AIDS.

== Ideas of enhanced recovery ==
Landscape Gardens that must be grown for the production of the therapeutic proteins brings a new time of recovery for certain patients. Professor Roger Ulrich of Texas A&M University believes that Therapeutic Gardens can help the spiritual needs of patients and enhance stress recovery. This relieves the patient of stress and gives the patient a feeling of tranquility during their recovery.

== Criticism and awareness ==
Many corporations are allowed to create genetically modified organisms and secure them through intellectual property rights creating monopolies, a fact that continues to evoke criticism . Awareness and education is needed for the public to understand how even GM plants have helped medical research. For instance, in 1992, a group of American students produced a Hepatitis B vaccine from a genetically modified tobacco plant showing the ability of produce pharmaceutical compounds.
