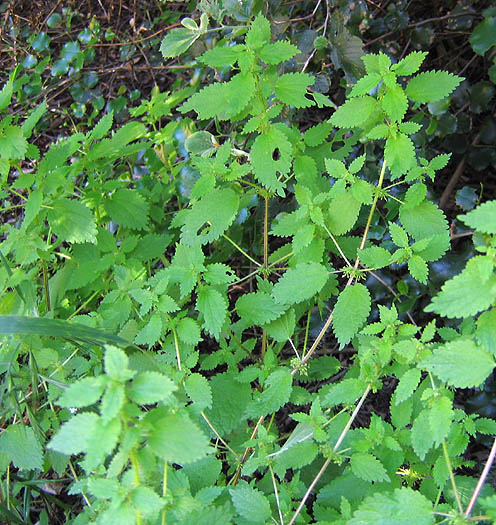

Scientific classification
- Kingdom: Plantae
- Clade: Tracheophytes
- Clade: Angiosperms
- Clade: Eudicots
- Clade: Rosids
- Order: Rosales
- Family: Urticaceae
- Genus: Hesperocnide
- Species: H. tenella

Binomial name
- Hesperocnide tenella Torr.

= Hesperocnide tenella =

Species of flowering plant

Hesperocnide tenella, also known as western nettle or western stinging nettle, is native to California and northern Baja California. It grows in chaparral, oak woodland, and coastal sage scrub communities up to 1,000 metres (3,300 ft) elevation.

== Description ==
Hesperocnide tenella is an annual plant with slender erect stems that do not exceed 50 centimeters. Like many other nettles, it has stinging hairs that contain formic acid. In addition, there are delicate hooked hairs on the calyx. The leaves are ovate, somewhat thin, and opposite in arrangement; the leaves are toothed along the sides, so they appear heavily serrated.

The inflorescences are round and head-like; they contain both pistillate and staminate flowers. The pistillate flowers have 2 to 4 sepals that are equal and fused to almost the tip, and one ovary. The staminate flowers have 4 sepals and 4 stamens. The flowers measure about a millimeter long. The fruit produced by the flowers are lenticular achenes and are enclosed by the calyx.

There are two species in this genus; this one native to California, and the other Hesperocnide sandwicensis, native to Hawaii.

== See also ==
- California chaparral and woodlands
  - California coastal sage and chaparral
  - California oak woodland
