= Tamil Malaysians =

Ethnic group in Malaysia

Malaysians of Tamil origin
மலேசியத் தமிழர்கள்
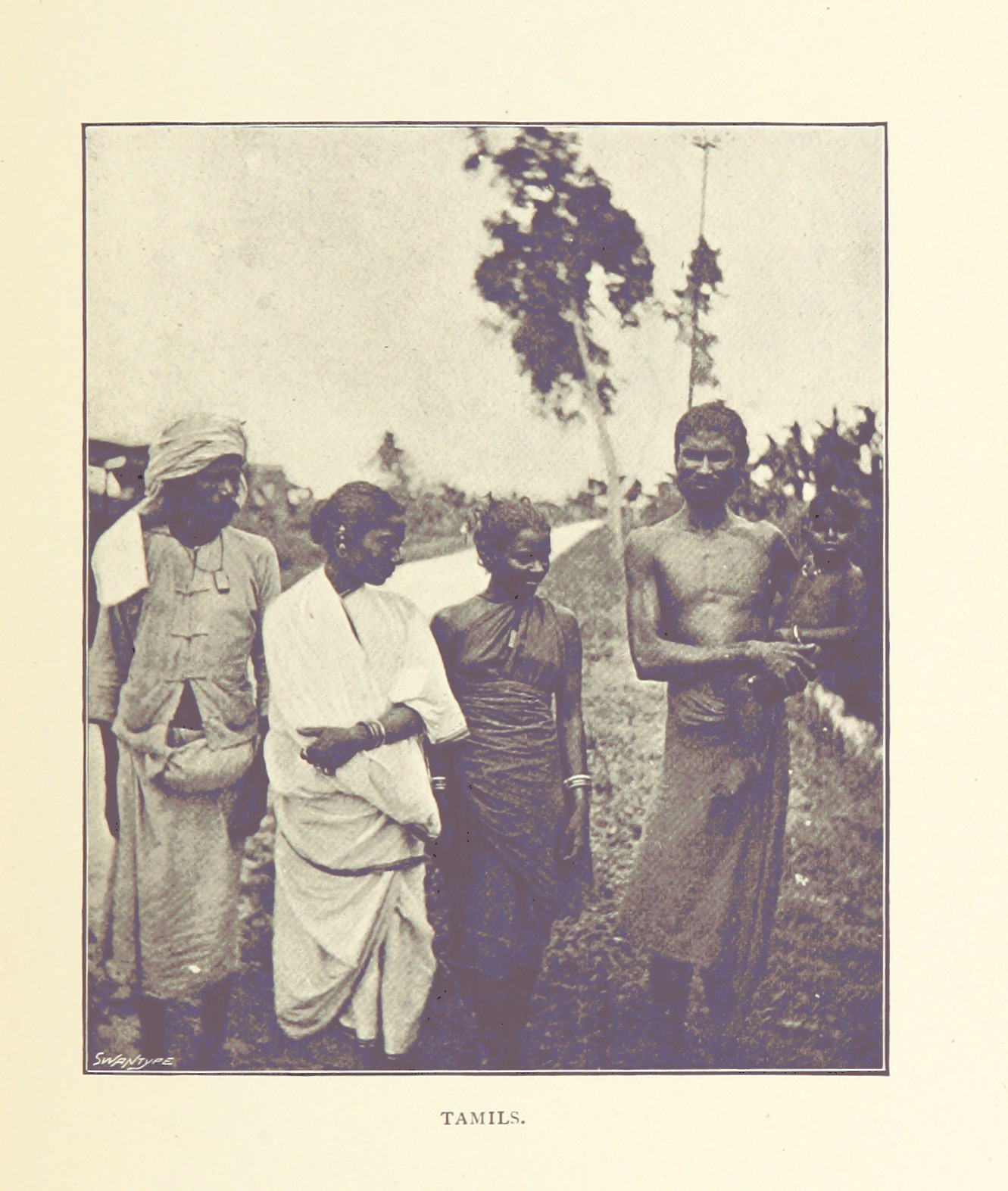
- A group of Tamil people in British Malaya, 1898.

Total population
- Approximately 1,971,000

Regions with significant populations
- Malaysia (Peninsular Malaysia); Singapore

Languages
- Malaysian Tamil, English and Malay

Religion
- Hinduism, Christianity, Buddhism, Islam

Related ethnic groups
- Tamil, Tamil Muslim, Myanmar Tamils, Indian Singaporeans, Sri Lankan Tamils, Indian Tamils of Sri Lanka, Tamil South Africans, Tamil Mauritians, Malaysian Malayali, Telugu Malaysians, Dravidians

Tamil Malaysians, also known as Malaysian Tamilar, are people of full or partial Tamil descent who were born in or immigrated to Malaysia from Tamil Nadu, India and the Tamil regions of north-east Sri Lanka. The majority of 1.8–2 million people 80% of the Malaysian Indian populations in Malaysia were from Indian Tamil ethnic groups from Tamil Nadu. The bulk of Tamil Malaysian migration began during the British Raj, when Britain facilitated the migration of Indian workers to work in plantations under Kangani system. There are, however, some established Tamil communities from before British colonialism.

== Precolonial period ==
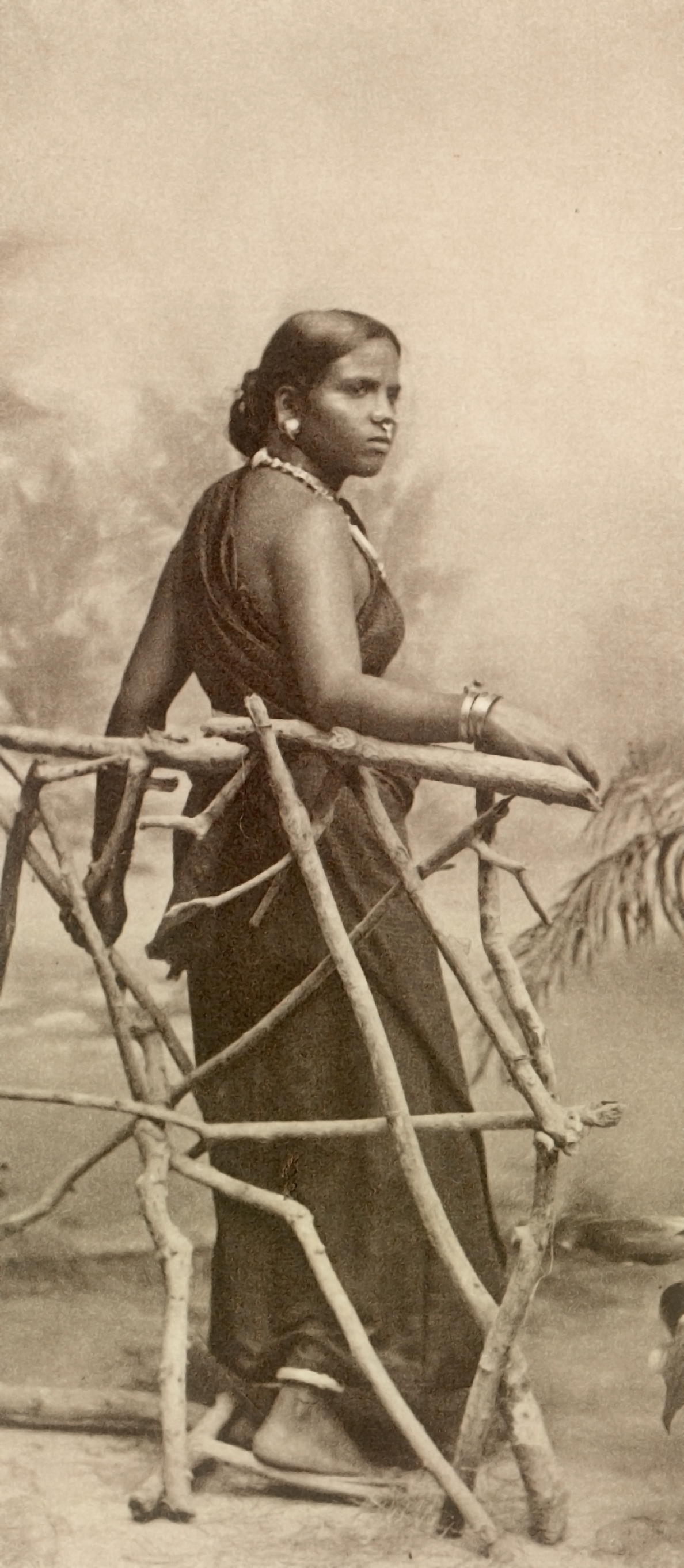
Tamil woman in the Malay Peninsula, circa 1910.

Relations between Tamils and, what is now, Malaysia have existed for more than 2000 years. The ancient Tamil poetic work Paṭṭiṉappālai refers to the territory of modern Malaysia as Kaalagam (Tamil: காழகம்).

Tamil literature from the 10th and 11th centuries refers to the modern Malaysian state of Kedah as Kadaram (Tamil: கடாரம்).

Prior to British colonization, Tamils had been conspicuous in the archipelago much earlier, especially since the period of the powerful South Indian kingdom of the Cholas in the 11th century. The Pallava dynasty of Tamil Nadu spread Tamil culture and the Tamil script to Malaysia. The Tamil emperor Rajendra Chola I of the Chola dynasty invaded Srivijaya in the 11th century.

The Malay Peninsula had a strong Tamil culture in the 11th century, and Tamil merchant guilds were established in several locations. By that time, Tamils were among the important trading peoples of maritime Asia. Although the bulk of these immigrants to South East Asia had assimilated with the majority Malay ethnic group, some communities such as the Malacca Chittys are remnants of these earlier Tamil migrants.

== Colonial period ==
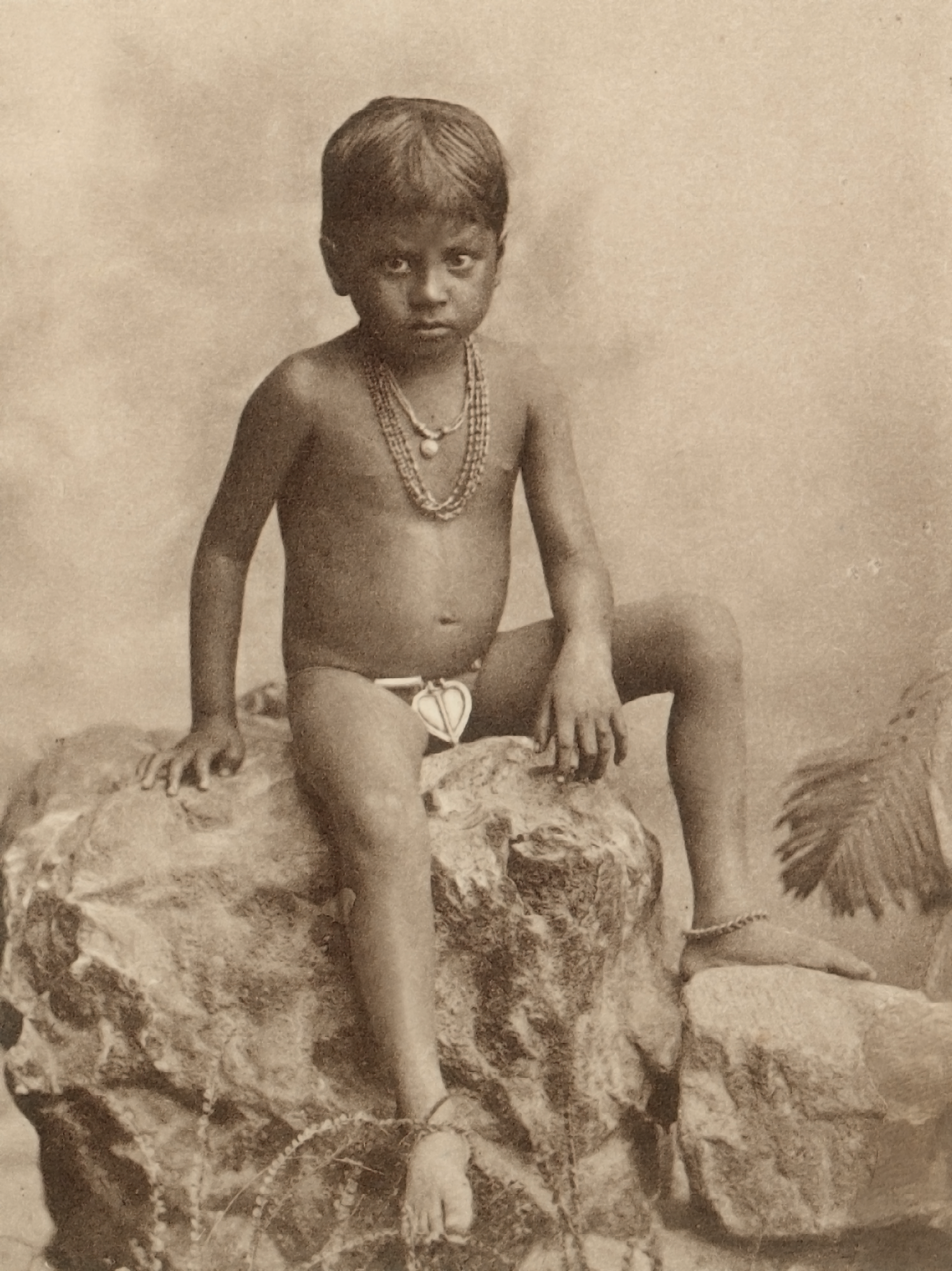
A Tamil girl in the Malay Peninsula, circa 1910.

During the British colonial era, Britain facilitated the migration of Indian workers to work in plantations under Kangani system. The overwhelming majority of migrants from India were ethnic Tamil and from the Madras Presidency now Tamil Nadu of the British Empire.

Many of those migrants from Tamil Nadu settled permanently in Malaysia and became shopkeepers and entrepreneurs.

Tamil Indian freedom fighters Maruthu Pandiyar relatives and 72 soldiers were deported to Penang in the year 1802 by the Madras Presidency Government (British India Government).

== Siam Burma Death Railway ==
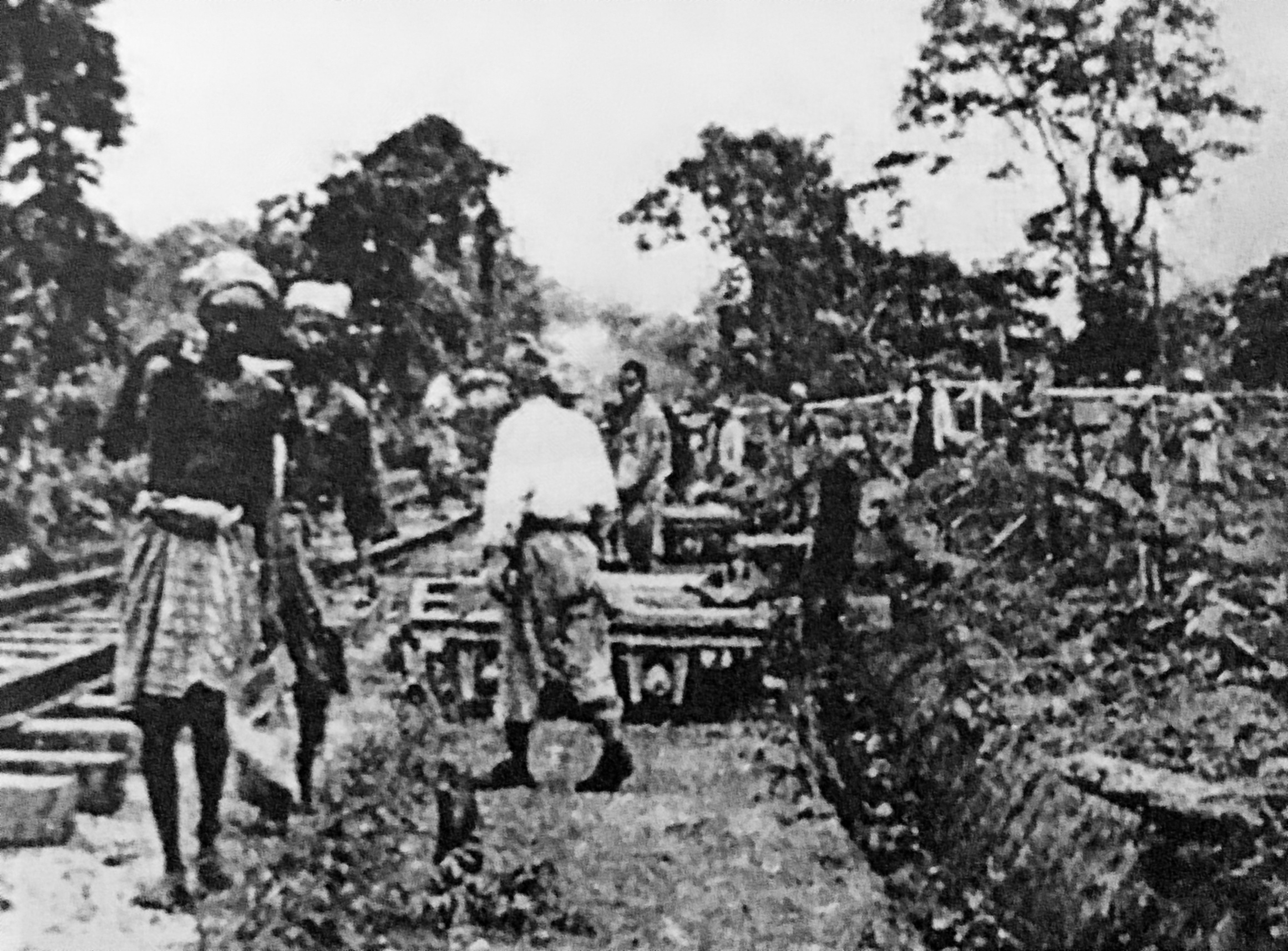
Malaysian Tamils during the construction of Death railway between June 1942 to October 1943.

During the Second World War, the Japanese army used more than 120,000 Tamils in the construction of a 415 km railway between Siam and Burma to transport army supplies. During this project, it was initially believed that half of them (around 60,000) perished.

However, recent research revealed that at least 150,000 Indian Tamils were killed during the duration of the Siam railway project. They fell victim to snake bites and insect bites, diseases like cholera, malaria & beriberi, massacre, torture, rape, committed suicide, etc. as they were unable to bear the burden.

In order to wipe out cholera, Japanese forces launched huge massacres against the Indians, killing massive numbers of the Tamils daily. Handfuls of Tamils also died weekly from overwork.

== Language ==
Tamil is an educational language in Malaysia, with more than 500 Tamil medium schools. According to Harold Schiffman, an American researcher into Malaysian Tamils, compared to Singapore, language maintenance is favourable in Malaysia. However, he notes some Tamils are shifting to English and Malay. Although most Tamil students still go to publicly funded schools that teach primary subjects in Tamil language there are moves to shift to the Malay language. Tamil groups have objected to this policy.

== Economic condition ==
Malaysian Tamils had the opportunity to integrate with the expanding economy of Malaysia since 1970 under the New Economic Policy (NEP). Although the bulk of them still remain as workers in the plantation sector in rubber and palm oil estates at those times very many have moved out as blue collar and white collar workers in the expanding industrial sector. They are also found in civil service, professional sector, media and finance. One of Malaysia's wealthiest men Ananda Krishnan was of Malaysian Tamil origin. Overall it is one of the most dynamic Indian communities compared to other Indian diaspora groups such as in Fiji, Guyana and Trinidad and Tobago.

== Political condition ==
The Malaysian political process is based on a cooperative political alliance of three major political parties, each representing an ethnic community. Malaysian Indian Congress (MIC) represents the interests of the Malaysian Indian community at the federal level. Due to overwhelming natural presence, Malaysian Tamils have come to dominate the MIC since its inception. Samy Vellu, who is the longest serving leader of a mainstream Malaysian political party, having been MIC president since October 12, 1979 is a Malaysian Tamil, as are many of the office bearers of the party. In recent times the underclass of the Indian community have been galvanised by the Hindu Rights Action Force (HINDRAF) to fight for their rights. HINDRAF was classified as an illegal organisation on 15 October 2008 and most of its top leaders have been detained under the Internal Security Act (ISA). In July 2018 Malaysian police launched a probe into P. Ramasamy's, deputy chief minister of Penang, alleged ties to LTTE.

== Notable people ==
This is a list of notable Tamil Malaysians. Entries on this list have a linked current article which verifies that they identify themselves as Tamil Malaysian, and whose ethnic origins lie in either Tamil Nadu (India), or Sri Lanka.

- David Arumugam, singer
- Loganathan Arumugam, singer
- R. Arumugam, Malaysian football player
- R. G. Balan, Malaya freedom fighter
- Sabrina Beneett, Miss Universe Malaysia 2014
- S. A. Ganapathy, trade unionist and Malaya freedom fighter
- G. Gnanalingam, businessman
- Punch Gunalan, Malaysian badminton player
- Ka. Kaliaperumal, distinguished Tamil-language poet and author
- Sybil Kathigasu, Malaysian freedom fighter
- Ananda Krishnan, businessman (Sri Lankan Tamil)
- Kalai Mathee, Professor and Research Scientist, First Malaysian women to be inducted into as a Fellow of the American Academy of Microbiology in 2021
- M. Kulasegaran, lawyer and the incumbent minister of Human Resources
- M. Magendran, first Malaysian to conquer Mount Everest
- V. Manickavasagam, former Minister of Telecommunications
- Ramon Navaratnam, economist and former Secretary-General of Ministry of Transport
- Ramasamy Palanisamy, deputy chief minister of Penang state
- G. Palanivel, former Minister of Natural Resources and Environment
- K. Thamboosamy Pillay, businessman; founder of Batu Caves and Sri Mahamariamman Temple
- Waytha Moorthy Ponnusamy, lawyer and human rights activist
- V. T. Sambanthan, one of the founding fathers of Malaysia
- Vinod Sekhar, businessman
- B. C. Shekhar, scientist; modernized Malaysia’s natural rubber industry
- K. Rajagopal, Malaysian football manager
- Shan Ratnam, scientist, obstetrics and gynecology
- Subramaniam Sathasivam, Minister of Health
- B. Sathianathan, Malaysian football manager
- Ambiga Sreenevasan, lawyer and human rights advocate
- K. Thanabalasingam, Rear Admiral (Rtd), Royal Malaysian Navy
- Tun Ali of Malacca, ancient ruler of Malacca
- Tun Fatimah, Malaccan politician; wife of Mahmud Shah of Malacca
- Tun Mutahir of Malacca, 7th Bendahara of the Sultanate of Malacca
- P. Uthayakumar, lawyer and human rights activist
- S. Vanajah, finalist of the Malaysian space program (Angkasawan program)
- Dhilip Varman, musician, singer, and lyricist
- Renuga Veeran, Australian badminton player
- Thirumurugan Veeran, Malaysian football player
- P. Veerasenan, trade unionist and Malaya freedom fighter
- Samy Vellu, former Minister of Works, and former Minister of Energy, Telecommunications and Posts
- M. Viatilingam, Malaysian football player
- Jaclyn Victor, singer, actress

== See also ==
- Tamil South Africans
- Tamil Canadians
- List of Malaysian Tamils of Ceylonese origin
- Malaysian Malayali
- Singapore Tamils
- Malasiyan Tamil Diaspora
- Sri Lankan Tamil
