= Richard Sykes (microbiologist) =

British microbiologist (born 1942)

Sir Richard Sykes FRS FMedSci HonFREng
- Born: Richard Brook Sykes; 7 August 1942 (age 84); Huddersfield, West Yorkshire, England
- Education: Queen Elizabeth College (BSc); University of Bristol (PhD); Brunel University (DSc)
- Known for: Monobactam (1981); Formation of Glaxo-Wellcome (1995); Formation of GlaxoSmithKline (2000); Rector of Imperial College (2001–2008); Chair of Royal Institution (2010)
- Scientific career
- Fields: Microbiology; Antibiotics
- Workplaces: Imperial College London; Imperial College Healthcare; GlaxoSmithKline; Squibb Institute for Medical Research; Natural History Museum, London; Royal Botanic Gardens, Kew; NHS London; Brunel University; Eurasian Natural Resources Corporation; Reform think tank

Chair of the Vaccine Taskforce
- Incumbent
- Assumed office 2021

Sir Richard Brook Sykes FRS FMedSci HonFREng (born 7 August 1942) is a British microbiologist, the chair of the Royal Institution, the UK Stem Cell Foundation, and the trustees at King Edward VII's Hospital, and chancellor of Brunel University. As of June 2021, he is chair of the UK's Vaccine Taskforce, where he is responsible for overseeing the delivery of the COVID-19 vaccination programme, including preparations for booster programmes and encouraging vaccine innovation in the UK.

In 1972, after gaining a first class bachelor's degree and a doctorate, both in microbiology, Sykes was appointed head of the Antibiotic Resistance Unit at Glaxo, where he helped develop the antibiotic ceftazidime. Subsequently, he was recruited by the Squibb Institute, in the United States, where he then developed aztreonam, the first clinically effective monobactam, a term he coined in 1981 to describe a new group of monocyclic β-lactams produced by bacteria. He oversaw the merger of Glaxo with Wellcome, to form Glaxo-Wellcome in 1995 and became its chair two years later. He then oversaw the Glaxo Wellcome and SmithKline Beecham merger and held its chair until 2001.

His other appointments have included being rector of Imperial College from 2001 to 2008, chairman of NHS London from December 2008 to July 2010, vice-chairman of Lonza Group until 2013, and chairman of Imperial College Healthcare from 2012 to 2018.

== Early life and education ==
Richard Sykes was born in the outskirts of Huddersfield, in West Yorkshire, on 7 August 1942 to Eric Sykes and his wife Muriel Mary Sykes. He attended Royds Hall Grammar school. Prior to his A-levels and completing school, he took up a job as a technician in a pathology laboratory. After leaving secondary school he attended Paddington Technical College and Chelsea College, and gained a place at Queen Elizabeth College where he was awarded a first class BSc degree in microbiology. He received his doctorate in 1972 with a thesis on β-lactamases of Pseudomonas aeruginosa, from the University of Bristol, where he worked with Mark Richmond. In 1973, together, they reported the first β-lactamase classification scheme.

== Glaxo and Squibb ==
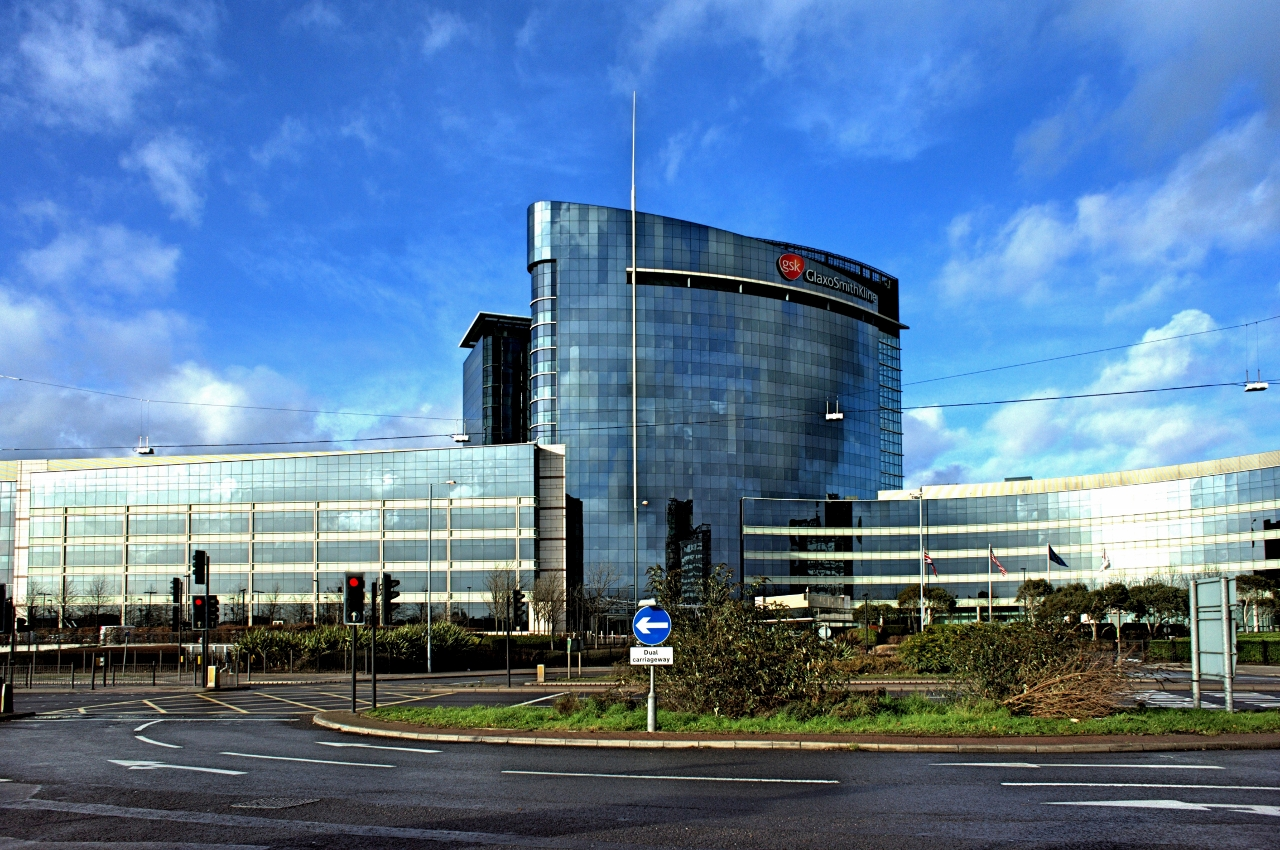
GlaxoSmithKline Headquarters

In 1972 Sykes was appointed head of the Antibiotic Resistance Unit at Glaxo. There, he helped develop the antibiotic ceftazidime. In 1977 he left Glaxo and was recruited to the United States by the Squibb Institute for Medical Research, where he worked under George B. Mackaness, the Australian immunologist who played an important part in getting the first ACE inhibitor, captopril, licensed. In 1979 Squibb appointed Sykes to lead research into monocyclic β-lactam antibiotics. There, he isolated product SQ26.180 from Chromobacterium violaceum, a bacteria discovered at Pine Barrens. By modifying the amide side chain and including a ceftazidime side chain, he produced aztreonam, the first monocyclic β-lactam antibiotic. In 1981 he coined this new group of antibiotics "monobactam". Its potential as a usefulness was published the following year. It could treat gram-negative infections such as gonorrhoea and became the first monobactam to be licensed for clinical use.

From 1983 to 1986 he was vice-president of infectious and metabolic diseases at Squibb. He returned to Glaxo in 1987 and succeeded David Jack, almost 30 years after Glaxo acquired Allen & Hanburys. The Harvard Business Review noted that at Glaxo, when a group of antibiotics failed in the last stages of clinical trial, Sykes praised the teams that had worked on them and encouraged them to move on. In 1993 he received his DSc.

In 1994, during his time at Glaxo, he was part of the group that founded the Jenner Institute for research into vaccines. In 1995 he oversaw the merger of Glaxo with Wellcome, to form Glaxo-Wellcome. In 1997, he became chair of Glaxo-Wellcome. In 2000 he oversaw the Glaxo Wellcome and SmithKline Beecham merger and held its chair until 2001. The merger resulted in the marketing of several new drugs. According to Sykes at the time, "the industry would be transformed by understanding the human genome".

== Royal Institution and others ==
Sykes was elected a Fellow of the Royal Society (FRS) in 1997. In 1994 he became a trustee of the Natural History Museum, London, and in 1997 he was appointed senior independent director of Rio Tinto plc, a position he held until 2008.

He was a member of the National Committee of Inquiry into Higher Education that published an influential report in 1997.

== Later career ==
=== Imperial ===
In January 2001, he was appointed rector of Imperial College London and completed his tenure in 2008. At Imperial, he was involved in several controversial debates including on issues such as increasing tuition fees, which he favoured. He criticised secondary schools for the quality of the science taught there, and opposed teaching grants being awarded on a per capita basis. In 2002 he proposed to merge Imperial College with University College London. The strength of opposition meant that it did not go through. He supported the lifting of the £3,000 cap on tuition fees and instead allowing the universities to set their own fees.

=== UK Stem Cell Foundation ===
Sykes chairs the UK Stem Cell Foundation. It was established in 2005.

=== Other roles ===
From 2003 to 2005 he was trustee of the Royal Botanic Gardens, Kew. From 2007 to 2011 he was senior independent director and non-executive deputy chairman of Eurasian Natural Resources Corporation. In September 2008, he was appointed chair of NHS London, but resigned in May 2010 over the decision of the Cameron Ministry to halt former health minister Ara Darzi's planned reorganisation of health care in London.

Between 2010 and 2012 he was on the advisory board of the Virgin Group. Until 2013, he was vice-chair at the Swiss life sciences company Lonza AG. He was appointed chairman of the Royal Institution in 2010 and Imperial College Healthcare in 2012. He was appointed Chancellor of Brunel University in 2013. In 2020, Sykes stepped down as chairman of the NetScientific Group after serving it for nine years.

=== Vaccine Taskforce ===
In 2020 he led an independent review of the workings of the Vaccine Taskforce. On 14 June 2021, Sykes was appointed chair of the Vaccine Taskforce, where he will be responsible for overseeing the delivery of the UK's COVID-19 vaccination programme, including preparations for booster programmes and encouraging vaccine innovation in the UK.

== Other activities ==
Sykes was chairman of the advisory panel of the think-tank Reform. He is a member of the Advisory Council for the Campaign for Science and Engineering. He is chair of the Trustees at King Edward VII's Hospital.

== Awards and honours ==
Sykes was knighted in the 1994 New Year Honours.

He holds honorary degrees from several universities including Birmingham, Brunel, Cranfield, Edinburgh, Hertfordshire, Huddersfield, Hull, Leeds, Leicester, Madrid, Newcastle, Nottingham, Sheffield Hallam, Sheffield, Strathclyde, Surrey, Warwick and Westminster. Sykes was elected a Fellow of the Academy of Medical Sciences (FMedSci) in 1998.

In 2009 he received the British Society for Antimicrobial Chemotherapy's Garrod Medal and delivered its accompanying lecture. It was titled "The evolution of antimicrobial resistance: a Darwinian perspective" and was published in the Journal of Antimicrobial Chemotherapy in 2010.

== Selected publications ==
=== Articles ===
- Richmond, M.H.; Sykes, R.B. (1973). "The β-Lactamases of Gram-Negative Bacteria and their Possible Physiological Role". Advances in Microbial Physiology Volume 9. Vol. 9. pp. 31–88. doi:10.1016/S0065-2911(08)60376-8. ISBN 978-0-12-027709-4. PMID 4581138. (Co-author)
- Sykes, R. B.; Cimarusti, C. M.; Bonner, D. P.; Bush, K.; Floyd, D. M.; Georgopapadakou, N. H.; Koster, W. H.; Liu, W. C.; Parker, W. L.; Principe, P. A.; Rathnum, M. L.; Slusarchyk, W. A.; Trejo, W. H.; Wells, J. S. (1981). "Monocyclic β-lactam antibiotics produced by bacteria". Nature. 291 (5815): 489–91. Bibcode:1981Natur.291..489S. doi:10.1038/291489a0. PMID 7015152. S2CID 4303108. (Co-author)
- Bush, K.; Freudenberger, J. S.; Sykes, R. B. (1982). "Interaction of azthreonam and related monobactams with beta-lactamases from gram-negative bacteria". Antimicrobial Agents and Chemotherapy. 22 (3): 414–20. doi:10.1128/AAC.22.3.414. PMC 183759. PMID 6982680. (Co-author)
- Sykes, R. B.; Bonner, D. P.; Bush, K.; Georgopapadakou, N. H. (January 1982). "Azthreonam (SQ 26,776), a synthetic monobactam specifically active against aerobic gram-negative bacteria". Antimicrobial Agents and Chemotherapy. 21 (1): 85–92. doi:10.1128/AAC.21.1.85. ISSN 0066-4804. PMC 181833. PMID 6979307. (Co-author)
- Sykes, R. (2001). "Penicillin: from discovery to product" (PDF). Bulletin of the World Health Organization. 79 (8): 778–779. ISSN 0042-9686. PMC 2566502. PMID 11545336. S2CID 33582904.
- Sykes, R. (1999). "The 1998 Radcliffe Lecture. Medicines, Morals and Money: the high ground and the bottom line". Business Ethics: A European Review. 8 (2): 79–87. doi:10.1111/1467-8608.00132. ISSN 1467-8608. PMID 11657843.
- Sykes, R. (1 September 2010). "The 2009 Garrod Lecture: The evolution of antimicrobial resistance: a Darwinian perspective". Journal of Antimicrobial Chemotherapy. 65 (9): 1842–1852. doi:10.1093/jac/dkq217. PMID 20573657.

=== Books ===
- New Medicines: The Practice of Medicine and Public Policy. The Nuffield Trust. 2000. ISBN 978-0-1170-2676-6.

=== Reports ===
- UK Vaccine Taskforce 2020 Achievements and Future Strategy (PDF). Gov.UK. December 2020.

Academic offices
Preceded by Ronald Oxburgh	Rector of Imperial College London; 2000–2008	Succeeded by Roy Anderson
Preceded by John Wakeham, Baron Wakeham	Chancellor of Brunel University; 2013–present	Succeeded by Incumbent
