= Tony Trinci =

British biologist

- Born: Anthony Peter John Trinci; 1936; Swindon
- Died: October 7, 2020
- Education: St Bonaventure's
- Alma mater: Durham University (BSc, MSc, PhD)
- Spouse: Margaret Doherty (m. 1961)
- Children: 3
- Awards: Marjory Stephenson Prize (1994)
- Scientific career
- Fields: Microbiology; Botany; Mycology
- Institutions: Queen Elizabeth College; University of Manchester
- Thesis: Studies of the growth and tropisms of Aspergillus giganteus and other fungi (1965)
- Doctoral advisor: Geoffrey Howard Banbury
- Doctoral students: Keith Gull

Anthony Peter John Trinci (1936, Swindon – 7 October 2020) was a British microbiologist, mycologist and botanist who was a leading expert on filamentous fungi. He served as a Professor, Dean and Pro-vice-chancellor at the University of Manchester.

== Early life and education ==
Trinci's parents, both born in Italy, had a troubled marriage and separated before his birth in Swindon. His father, a builder, lived in Italy, and Trinci did not meet his father until he was 11 years old. Trinci grew up in Barking, London. During World War II, a V-1 flying bomb passed through his bedroom (while he was absent), brought down the ceiling, but failed to explode until it landed about 100 yards down the road and killed several people.

Educated at St Bonaventure's Catholic School, Trinci studied Botany at Durham University in 1959. He was a member of St Cuthbert's Society, Durham. He stayed on to complete a Master of Science (MSc) degree, where his research focus was fungal physiology.

Trinci served as a secondary school science teacher in Rayleigh, Essex before returning to Durham for PhD research supervised by Geoffrey Howard Banbury (1920–1983) and completed in 1965 on the physiology and tropisms of tall conidiophores of the fungus Aspergillus giganteus.

== Career and research ==
In 1964 Trinci was appointed a lecturer in the microbiology department of Queen Elizabeth College (QEC). At QEC he did research on fungal growth kinetics and physiology. He developed new methods involving time-lapse photography that enabled "direct observation of colony growth and organisation of the mycelium by hyphal tip growth and branch initiation".

He moved from QEC in 1981 after being appointed as chair of cryptogamic botany at the University of Manchester. There he contributed to the development of the first integrated school of Biological sciences. This innovation was subsequently adopted in most of the UK's universities. At the University of Manchester he became a dean and then pro-vice-chancellor.

Trinci's knowledge of mycology was applied to commercial applications of filamentous fungi. He made substantial contributions to the development of Quorn and to Dupont's addition of fungal enzymes to commercial animal feed. His work with DuPont was the outcome of a decades-long collaboration with Michael K. Theodorou, a rumen microbiologist. Their collaboration elucidated the life cycles of anaerobic fungi in the gastrointestinal tracts of large, mammalian herbivores. A phytase enzyme, isolated from Penicillium species, is useful in releasing phosphate in animal feeds.

Trinci served as president of the British Mycological Society for the academic year 1991–1992 and was elected the president of the Microbiology Society in 1994. He was awarded the Marjory Stephenson Prize in 1994. He served an editor of the Journal of General Microbiology from 1990 to 1994, after which the journal was renamed Microbiology.

Trinci supported David Denning's creation of the University of Manchester's Manchester Fungal Infections Group, an international centre for fungal infection biology. Trinci served as a trustee of the Fungal Infection Institute from September 2006 to January 2011.

His former PhD students include Keith Gull who worked on the antifungal agent Griseofulvin.

=== Selected publications ===
Trinci's publications include:

- Righelato, R. C.; Trinci, A. P. J.; Pirt, S. J.; Peat, A. (1968). "The Influence of Maintenance Energy and Growth Rate on the Metabolic Activity, Morphology and Conidiation of Penicillium chrysogenum". Journal of General Microbiology. 50 (3): 399–412. doi:10.1099/00221287-50-3-399. PMID 5652074.
- Trinci, A. P. J. (1969). "A Kinetic Study of the Growth of Aspergillus nidulans and Other Fungi". Journal of General Microbiology. 57 (1): 11–24. doi:10.1099/00221287-57-1-11. PMID 5822157.
- Trinci, A. P. J. (1971). "Influence of the Width of the Peripheral Growth Zone on the Radial Growth Rate of Fungal Colonies on Solid Media". Journal of General Microbiology. 67 (3): 325–344. doi:10.1099/00221287-67-3-325.
- Griseofulvin inhibits Fungal Mitosis
- Fiddy, C.; Trinci, A. P. J. (1976). "Mitosis, Septation, Branching and the Duplication Cycle in Aspergillus nidulans". Journal of General Microbiology. 97 (2): 169–184. doi:10.1099/00221287-97-2-169. PMID 796408.
- Prosser, J. I.; Trinci, A. P. J. (1979). "A Model for Hyphal Growth and Branching". Journal of General Microbiology. 111 (1): 153–164. doi:10.1099/00221287-111-1-153. PMID 379276.
- Lowe, S. E.; Theodorou, M. K.; Trinci, A. P. J.; Hespell, R. B. (1985). "Growth of Anaerobic Rumen Fungi on Defined and Semi-defined Media Lacking Rumen Fluid". Microbiology. 131 (9): 2225–2229. doi:10.1099/00221287-131-9-2225.
- Lowe, S. E.; Griffith, G. G.; Milne, A.; Theodorou, M. K.; Trinci, A. P. J. (1987). "The Life Cycle and Growth Kinetics of an Anaerobic Rumen Fungus". Microbiology. 133 (7): 1815–1827. doi:10.1099/00221287-133-7-1815.
- Milne, Andrew; Theodorou, Michael K.; Jordan, Matthew G.C.; King-Spooner, Catherine; Trinci, Anthony P.J. (1989). "Survival of anaerobic fungi in feces, in saliva, and in pure culture". Experimental Mycology. 13 (1). Elsevier BV: 27–37. doi:10.1016/0147-5975(89)90005-4. ISSN 0147-5975.
- Trinci, Anthony P.J. (1992). "Myco-protein: A twenty-year overnight success story". Mycological Research. 96: 1–13. doi:10.1016/S0953-7562(09)80989-1.
- Davies, D. R.; Theodorou, M. K.; Lawrence, M. I. G.; Trinci, A. P. J. (1993). "Distribution of anaerobic fungi in the digestive tract of cattle and their survival in faeces". Journal of General Microbiology. 139 (6): 1395–1400. doi:10.1099/00221287-139-6-1395. PMID 8360630.
- Trinci, Anthony P.J.; Davies, David R.; Gull, Keith; Lawrence, Michelle I.; Bonde Nielsen, Bettina; Rickers, André; Theodorou, Michael K. (1994). "Anaerobic fungi in herbivorous animals". Mycological Research. 98 (2): 129–152. doi:10.1016/S0953-7562(09)80178-0.
- Anaerobic fungi in the digestive tract of mammalian herbivores and their potential for exploitation
- Trinci, A. P. J. (2000). "A Study of the Kinetics of Hyphal Extension and Branch Initiation of Fungal Mycelia". Microbiology. 81 (1): 225–236. doi:10.1099/00221287-81-1-225. PMID 4274556.
- Brookman, J. L.; Mennim, G.; Trinci, A. P. J.; Theodorou, M. K.; Tuckwell, D. S. (2000). "Identification and characterization of anaerobic gut fungi using molecular methodologies based on ribosomal ITS1 and 18S rRNA the Gen Bank accession numbers for the sequences determined in this work are given in Methods". Microbiology. 146 (2): 393–403. doi:10.1099/00221287-146-2-393. PMID 10708378.
- Sánchez, C.; Moore, D.; Robson, G.; Trinci, T. (2020). "A 21st century miniguide to fungal biotechnology (Una miniguía del siglo XXI para la biotecnología de bongos)". Mexican Journal of Biotechnology. 5 (1): 11–42. doi:10.29267/mxjb.2020.5.1.11. (Note: The article is presented in both English and Spanish; Trinci's name is published aa "Tony Trinci".)
- Loftus, M.G.; Sánchez, C.; Moore, D.; Robson, G.; Trinci, T. (2020). "A 21st century miniguide to sporophore morphogenesis and development in Agaricomycetes and their biotechnological potential ( Una miniguía del siglo XXI para la morfogénesis y desarrollo del esporocarpo en Agaricomicetos y su potential biotecnológico)". Mexican Journal of Biotechnology. 5 (2): 1–50. doi:10.29267/mxjb.2020.5.2.1.
- Moore, David; Robson, Geoffrey D.; Trinci, Anthony P. J. (2020). 2nd edition. Cambridge University Press. ISBN 978-1108745680.
- Kuhn, Paul J.; Trinci, Anthony PJ; Jung, Michel J.; Goosey, Michael W.; Copping, Leonard G., eds. (6 December 2012). Biochemistry of Cell Walls and Membranes in Fungi. Springer. ISBN 9783642742156.

== Personal life ==
In January 1961 Trinci married Margaret Doherty, whom he met at Durham University. Upon his death in 2020 he was survived by his widow, their three children, John, Sarah and Rachel, seven grandchildren and two great-grandchildren.
