= Laura Piddock =

British microbiologist

- Education: University of Birmingham
- Scientific career
- Workplaces: University of Birmingham
- Thesis: The Penicillin Binding Proteins of four species of Bacteroides (1985)
- Website: www.revive.gardp.org

Laura Piddock is a microbiologist, specialising in antibiotics and antibiotic resistance in bacteria. She is Professor Emerita at the University of Birmingham, UK and also Scientific Director within the Global Antibiotic Research and Development Partnership.

== Education ==
Laura J. V. Piddock gained a BSc degree in Biological Sciences (Biochemistry and Microbiology) in 1981 and was awarded a PhD degree by the University of Birmingham in 1985 for work on penicillin binding proteins with Richard Wise at Dudley Road Hospital, Birmingham.

== Career ==
She has been employed at University of Birmingham since 2001. Her research concentrates on the origin of antibiotic resistance in bacteria but also includes a broad interest in all aspects of the continued use of antibiotics in medicine. She is particularly interested in the control of expression of bacterial efflux pumps and their role in bacterial biology, especially as pathogens. Her research includes identifying inhibitors of efflux pumps. The genes for aspects of antibiotic resistance are often found on mobile genetic elements (plasmids) and her research is therefore also into how transfer of plasmids between bacteria can be inhibited.

Her research group has worked on the broad-spectrum fluoroquinolone antibiotics, providing better information on how this class of antibiotics can be used more effectively in medicine for humans and animals. In particular, this has addressed the way that their use in veterinary practice can generate antibiotic resistant bacteria that enter the food chain of humans.

== Awards ==
She was President of the British Society for Antimicrobial Chemotherapy from 2009 until 2012. She was elected a Fellow of the Academy of Microbiology in 2001, the Royal Society of Biology in 2012 and has also been elected a Fellow of the European Society of Clinical Microbiology and Infectious Diseases. In 2014 she was awarded the Marjory Stephenson Prize by the Microbiology Society for research into the basis of antibiotic resistance as a platform for early drug discovery and in 2016 she won the Microbiology Society's Microbiology Outreach Prize. In 2019 she was awarded the Garrod Lecture and Medal by the British Society for Antimicrobial Chemotherapy for how her work on antibiotic efflux has led to new ideas for drug discovery.

== Publications ==
Piddock is the author or co-author of over 250 scientific publications, reports and book chapters. These include:

- George Youlden, Vito Ricci, Xuan Wang Kan, Laura Piddock, Sara Jabbari and John R. King (2021) Time dependent asymptotic analysis of the gene regulatory network of the AcrAB-TolC efflux pump system in gram-negative bacteria. Journal of Mathematical Biology 82
- Laura Piddock (2016) Reflecting on the final report of the O'Neill Review on Antimicrobial Resistance. The Lancet Infectious Diseases 16 767-768
