= Antibiotic Action =

UK-based awareness initiative

Antibiotic Action is a UK-based initiative that works to raise global awareness about antibiotic resistance, and is funded by the British Society for Antimicrobial Chemotherapy (BSAC), a UK registered charity. Antibiotic Action seeks to inform and educate people from various backgrounds, ranging from politicians to healthcare professionals to the public, about the need for discovery, research, and development of new treatments for bacterial infections to combat antibiotic resistance. It also aims to strengthen and enhance academic-industrial partnerships by bringing together communities that need antibiotics with academia, health-care professionals, and pharmaceutical companies to address the challenges facing antibiotic research, drug development, and Antimicrobial stewardship.

== Activities ==
- Antibiotic Action is working to identify how all sectors can be informed of the pending crisis of no new antibiotics.
- Antibiotic Action is working to identify what opportunities exist for discovery, research, and development to ensure new antibiotics to maintain the health of the global population.
- Antibiotic Action contributes to national and international activities such as conferences, media interviews, presentations, and displays to educate people about the importance of finding new ways to treat bacterial infections.
