= Microbiology Outreach Prize =

Microbiology award

- Awarded for: Outstanding innovation in outreach about microbiology
- Presented by: Microbiology Society
- First award: 2009

Microbiology Outreach Prize is awarded annually by the Microbiology Society to those who made outstanding innovation in outreach about microbiology.

It was introduced in 2009 and is awarded to individuals or teams. All members can nominate anyone they consider appropriate for this award.

The award consists of £500 and an invitation to give a demonstration or talk at the society's Annual Society Showcase in September.

The following have been awarded this prize:

- 2009 Jo Heaton
- 2010 Gemma Walton
- 2011 Nicola Stanley-Wall
- 2012 Marieke Hoeve
- 2013 James Redfern and Helen Brown
- 2014 Joana Alves Moscoso
- 2015 Adam Roberts
- 2016 Laura Piddock
- 2017 No award made
- 2018 Senga Robertson-Albertyn
- 2019 Matt Hutchings
- 2020 Sreyashi Basu and Sanjib Bhakta for Project Joi Hok! a community tuberculosis awareness programme in the UK
- 2021 Edward Hutchinson
- 2022 Kalai Mathee and Jonathan Tyrrell
