= Garrod Lecture and Medal =

Award presented by the British Society for Antimicrobial Chemotherapy

The Garrod Lecture and Medal is an award presented by the British Society for Antimicrobial Chemotherapy. It was established in 1982 and named for L. P. Garrod. The medal is made of silver by the Birmingham Mint. The recipient of the award is considered by the society as having international authority in the field of antimicrobial chemotherapy. They are invited to deliver an accompanying lecture and receive honorary membership of the Society.

== Recipients ==
Awards
| Year | Recipient | Lecture title |
|---|---|---|
| 1982 | Sir Mark Richmond | β-Lactamases: are they really important? |
| 1983 | F W O'Grady | Strategies for potentiating chemotherapy in severe sepsis: some experimental pointers. |
| 1984 | Sir Charles Stuart-Harris | Strategies of antiviral chemotherapy. |
| 1985 | Naomi Datta | Antidotes of bacteria to antibacterial drugs |
| 1986 | Sir Edward P Abraham | β-Lactamase antibiotics: motivation, science and luck in their past and future |
| 1987 | George N. Rolinson | The influence of 6-aminopenicillanic acid on antibiotic development. |
| 1990 | Robert C. Moellering Jr | The enterococcus: a classic example of the impact of antimicrobial resistance on therapeutic options. |
| 1991 | Denis Mitchison | Understanding the chemotherapy of tuberculosis - current problems. |
| 1999 | Alasdair Geddes | Infection in the 21st Century - and possible implications for therapy. |
| 2009 | Sir Richard Sykes | The evolution of antimicrobial resistance: a Darwinian perspective |
| 2011 | Brian Spratt | My 40 years - from penicillin-binding proteins to molecular epidemiology. Given during the BSAC 40th anniversary scientific Spring Meeting |
| 2012 | Ian Chopra | Discovery of anti-bacterial drugs in the twenty-first century |
| 2014 | Gunnar Kahlmeter | EUCAST - are we heading towards international agreement? |
| 2016 | John E. McGowan Jr | The role of the healthcare epidemiologist in antimicrobial chemotherapy—a view from the USA |
| 2017 | Peter Hawkey | Genes, guts and globalization |
| 2018 | David Livermore | The Black Swans of Resistance |
| 2019 | Laura Piddock | MDR efflux in Gram-negative bacteria—how understanding resistance led to a new tool for drug discovery |
| 2026 | Ramanan Laxminarayan | Achieving the UNGA AMR mortality reduction goals |
