= Kalai Mathee =

Microbiologist

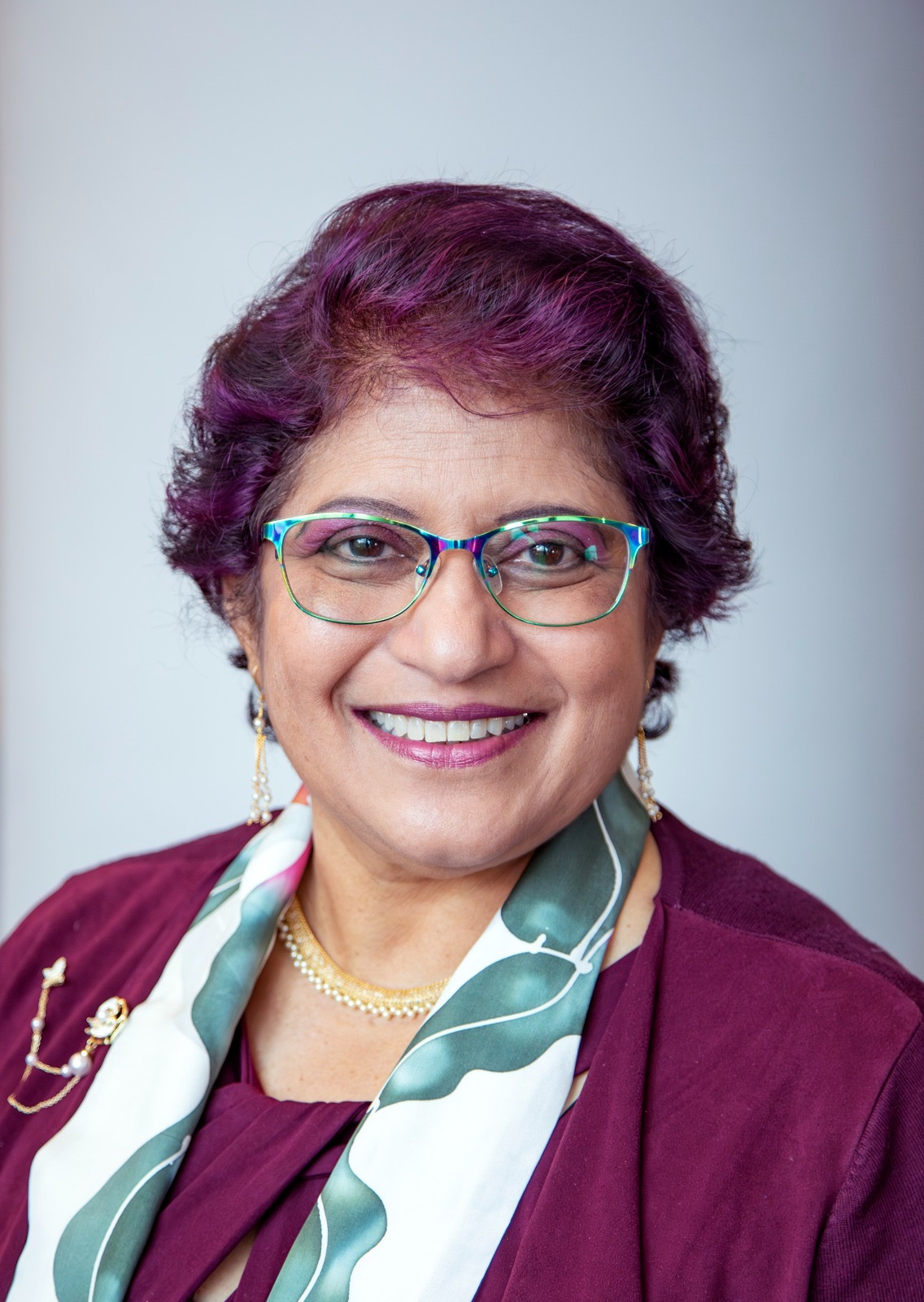
- Born: 30 August 1959 (age 67)
- Education: MPH, Health Policy and Management, Florida International University (2018) PhD, Microbiology and Immunology, University of Tennessee, Memphis (1992) MSc, Microbial Genetics, University of Malaya, Kuala Lumpur, Malaysia (1986) BSc, Genetics, University of Malaya. Kuala Lumpur, Malaysia (1984)
- Spouse: Giri Narasimhan
- Parent(s): Ka. Kaliaperumal; Rugmani Loganayaki
- Scientific career
- Thesis: Function and regulation of the bacteriophage Mu middle operon (1992)

Kalai Mathee (born 30 August 1959) is a Malaysian microbiologist, who spent almost 25 years at Florida International University. She served as the first international editor-in-chief of the Journal of Medical Microbiology. She is an elected fellow of the American Academy of Microbiology and the Royal Society of Biology. She is an equity advocate known for her research on bacterial infections caused by Pseudomonas aeruginosa, antimicrobial resistance, microbiome, and multiomics.

Mathee founded the Global Health Consortium with a focus on partnerships in the Caribbean, Central, and South American regions. Her scientific networks span over 89 countries. She served as a WHO/PAHO Visiting Scientist and sabbatical at Harvard Medical School.

Her equity leadership includes founding the MLK Hall of Fame at FIU and serving as a Trustee of the Microbiology Society (UK) and Royal Society of Biology. She was part of the Trustee board that led the governance restructuring of the Microbiology Society.

She has chaired and co-chaired the biennial Pseudomonas Conference, which has attracted participants from over 31 countries. She has secured over $3.8 million in external funding, holds six patents, and has mentored over 175 professionals from diverse backgrounds. Her post-conflict educational work in Liberia and her sustained leadership in Asia-Pacific scientific networks (across 10 countries and spanning over 20 years) demonstrate her commitment to building capacity in the Global South and fostering authentic international partnerships.

== Early life and education ==
Kalai Mathee was born into a working-class family in Malaysia to Kuyilar Kaliaperumal and Loganayaki. She is of Tamil heritage and got her early education in a vernacular school SJKT Kerajaan in Ipoh. She has a Bachelor of Science in Genetics from the University of Malaya in Kuala Lumpur, graduating in 1984, and completed her master's in molecular genetics focusing on Neisseria gonorrhoeae in 1986 under the tutelage of Chong-Lek Koh. Mathee did her Ph.D. (1992) at the University of Tennessee Health Science Center at Memphis under Martha Howe's guidance specializing in transcription. Mathee did two post-doctorate fellowships, one at Tufts University focusing on Helicobacter pylori pathogenesis in the year 1993; the other at the University of Tennessee Health Science Center working on Pseudomonas aeruginosa pathogenesis from 1993-1999. In 2018, she received her master's degree in Public Health in Health Policy and Management from Florida International University.

== Career ==
In 1999, Mathee moved to Florida International University where she was promoted to professor in 2013. She did a sabbatical at Harvard Medical School in Stephen Lory's lab from 2006-2007. In 2007 she was the founding chair of the Department of Molecular Microbiology and Infectious Diseases at Florida International University.

In 2017, Mathee and Norman Fry were named co editors in Chief of the Journal of Medical Microbiology.

== Research ==
Since 1993, the major focus of Mathee's research has been the pathobiology of Pseudomonas aeruginosa chronic infections with specific emphasis on β-lactam resistance, alginate overproduction, comparative genomics, alternative therapies, and cystic fibrosis lung ecology. Her early research identified the function and regulatory mechanisms of the bacteriophage Mu. Her postdoctoral research focused on alginate gene regulation with a focus on the alginate-specific sigma factor, AlgT/U, and she was the first to show MucA is an inner membrane protein. Mathee also showed that polymorphonuclear leukocytes and oxygen radicals can contribute to mucoid conversion by Pseudomonas aeruginosa. Mathee has examined the role of quorum sensing molecules in Pseudomonas aeruginosa infections, and demonstrated that alginate is not required for biofilm formation. Her work has used comparative genomics and transcriptomics to define variability across strains of Pseudomonas aeruginosa. A portion of Mathee's research is on β-lactam resistance, particularly the amp pathway where she showed the presence of a β-lactamase PoxB, two permeases, and coregulation of antibiotic resistance and other virulence factors mediated by AmpR. Current ongoing research focuses on exploring various microbiomes, including lung, irritable bowel syndrome, vaginal, and gut.

== Selected publications ==
- Hughes, Kelly T.; Mathee, Kalai (1998-10-01). "The anti-sigma factors". Annual Review of Microbiology. 52 (1): 231–286. doi:10.1146/annurev.micro.52.1.231. ISSN 0066-4227. PMID 9891799. S2CID 39757445.
- Mathee, Kalai; Ciofu, Oana; Sternberg, Claus; Lindum, Peter W.; Campbell, Joan I. A.; Jensen, Per; Johnsen, Anders H.; Givskov, Michael; Ohman, Dennis E.; Søren, Molin; Høiby, Niels (1999-06-01). "Mucoid conversion of Pseudomonas aeruginos by hydrogen peroxide: a mechanism for virulence activation in the cystic fibrosis lung". Microbiology. 145 (6): 1349–1357. doi:10.1099/13500872-145-6-1349. ISSN 1350-0872. PMID 10411261.
- Adonizio, Allison; Kong, Kok-Fai; Mathee, Kalai (2008). "Inhibition of Quorum Sensing-Controlled Virulence Factor Production in Pseudomonas aeruginosa by South Florida Plant Extracts". Antimicrobial Agents and Chemotherapy. 52 (1): 198–203. doi:10.1128/AAC.00612-07. ISSN 0066-4804. PMC 2223872. PMID 17938186.
- Mathee, Kalai; Narasimhan, Giri; Valdes, Camilo; Qiu, Xiaoyun; Matewish, Jody M.; Koehrsen, Michael; Rokas, Antonis; Yandava, Chandri N.; Engels, Reinhard; Zeng, Erliang; Olavarietta, Raquel (2008-02-26). "Dynamics of Pseudomonas aeruginosa genome evolution". Proceedings of the National Academy of Sciences. 105 (8): 3100–3105. Bibcode:2008PNAS..105.3100M. doi:10.1073/pnas.0711982105. ISSN 0027-8424. PMC 2268591. PMID 18287045.
- Kong, Kok-Fai; Schneper, Lisa; Mathee, Kalai (2010). "Beta-lactam antibiotics: from antibiosis to resistance and bacteriology: BETA-LACTAM RESISTANCE". APMIS. 118 (1): 1–36. doi:10.1111/j.1600-0463.2009.02563.x. PMC 2894812. PMID 20041868.

== Awards and honors ==
In 2011, she was awarded the President's Council Worlds Ahead Faculty Award from Florida International University. Mathee was named a distinguished fellow of the Malaysian Biotechnology Information Centre in 2013. In 2014, she was one of the inaugural recipients of the New England Biolabs Passion in Science Award. In 2020, Mathee was elected a fellow of the American Academy of Microbiology. Mathee is the first Florida International University faculty member to receive this honor, and the first Malaysian woman to receive this honor. In 2022 she was awarded the Microbiology Society's Microbiology Outreach Prize.

== Personal life ==
In 1993, she married a computer science professor, Giri Narasimhan, in Nashville, Tennessee.
