= Keith Gull =

British microbiologist

Keith Gull CBE FRS FMedSci
- Born: 29 May 1948 (age 78)
- Education: King's College London (BSc, PhD)
- Awards: Marjory Stephenson Prize (1996); EMBO Membership (2010)
- Scientific career
- Fields: Biochemistry; Molecular biology
- Workplaces: University of Manchester; University of Kent; University of Oxford
- Thesis: Studies on the Effect of Griseofulvin on Fungal Growth and Cytology (1973)
- Doctoral advisor: Tony Trinci
- Website: users.path.ox.ac.uk/~kgull

Keith Gull (born 29 May 1948) is a British microbiologist who is a Wellcome Trust Principal Research Fellow and Professor of Molecular microbiology at the Sir William Dunn School of Pathology, University of Oxford. He was the principal of St Edmund Hall, Oxford from 1 October 2009 to 30 September 2018, succeeding Michael Mingos.

== Education ==
Gull was educated at Eston Grammar School and King's College London where he was awarded a first class Bachelor of Science degree in 1969 followed by a PhD in 1973 supervised by Tony Trinci.

== Career and research ==
On completion of his PhD, he moved to a lectureship at the University of Kent. He held a personal chair at Kent when he moved to the University of Manchester where he spent the 1990s involved with the development of the School of Biological Sciences as Head of Biochemistry and Research Dean. He moved to Oxford in 2002. He was Chairman of the Biochemical Society (1999–2002), and is a trustee of Cancer Research UK. According to Google Scholar and Scopus his most cited peer-reviewed scientific papers are on Trypanosoma brucei and Trypanosoma cruzi. More recently, the Gull laboratory has worked on Leishmania.

After nine years as Principal Professor of St Edmund Hall, Oxford, Gull retired at the end of the 2017-18 academic year, and was succeeded by Kathy Willis.

=== Controversy ===
During his tenure as Principal of St Edmund Hall, he was alleged to have exploited college finances by claiming £500 in "Christmas presents" and "gifts" between November and December 2015, and £185 on a desk lamp in November 2017. Gull defended his Christmas expenses claims, but not the desk lamp claim.

In 2010, Gull attracted criticism by his students and the national press for the decision to spend £15,000 on a college snowdrop garden amid budget cuts. He defended the decision, claiming the snowdrops will be "fantastic", but apologised for the way in which it was made.

In 2015, Gull declined requests to clarify the status of claims made by Bongbong Marcos, son of Filipino dictator Ferdinand Marcos, about whether he finished his degree at St Edmund Hall, Oxford.

=== Awards and honours ===
Among numerous prizes, fellowships, and other awards, Keith Gull was awarded the Marjory Stephenson Prize from the Society for General Microbiology (1996), was elected Fellow of the Academy of Medical Sciences (1999), elected Fellow of the Royal Society (FRS) in 2003, and was appointed a CBE in the 2004 New Year Honours list for services to microbiology. He holds an honorary Doctor of Science from the University of Kent. His certificate of election to the Royal Society reads:

Distinguished for his contributions to our understanding of the cell and molecular biology of eukaryotic microbes, especially fungi, slime moulds and trypanosomes. His work has provided important insights into how cells construct their cytoskeletons by modulating tubulin gene expression and protein modification. His novel approaches have led to discovery of unusual mechanisms of microtubule initiation and the partitioning of genomes in sleeping sickness trypanosomes, also of the relationship of division to differentiation in these parasites. His discovery of the mode of action of the antifungal agent griseofulvin has been followed by explanations of the selective toxicity and resistance mechanisms of fungicides and anthelminthics.

Gull was elected a member of the European Molecular Biology Organization (EMBO) in 2010.
