= Charles Stuart-Harris =

English virologist and academic

Charles Herbert Stuart-Harris
- Born: 12 July 1909; King's Norton, Birmingham, England
- Died: 23 February 1996 (aged 86)
- Scientific career
- Fields: Virology
- Workplaces: University of Sheffield

Sir Charles Herbert Stuart-Harris CBE (born Harris; 12 July 1909 – 23 February 1996) was an English virologist and academic who was the first full-time professor of medicine at University of Sheffield.

== Early life and education ==
Stuart-Harris was born in 1909 in Kings Norton, the son of a Birmingham general practitioner Charles Herbert Harris and his wife, Helen Parsons.

== Career ==
In 1935, he received a £55 a year fellowship from the bequest of Sir Henry Royce (of Rolls-Royce) to conduct research at the National Institute for Medical Research into the cause and cure of influenza. The following year he went to the United States on a Rockefeller scholarship. In World War II he served in the Royal Army Medical Corps in Europe and the Far East, commanding field laboratories, ending with the rank of colonel and showing an early acumen in the diagnosis of infective diseases. He himself contracted some of those diseases he studied, notably typhus and typhoid.

When he was appointed to the chair at Sheffield in 1946 the shortlist included George White Pickering and Robert Platt who respectively became regius professor of medicine and master of Pembroke College at Oxford and professor of medicine at Manchester and president of the Royal College of Physicians. At Sheffield, Stuart-Harris carried out research into poliomyelitis and influenza viruses (the oral polio vaccine underwent its first trials at Sheffield) and set up a major research and epidemiological unit to investigate respiratory illnesses. He identified the difference between influenza and the common cold, showing that several strains of influenza virus existed and that vaccination against one was not necessarily proof against another.

== Awards and honours ==
He was honoured with a C.B.E. in 1961 and a knighthood in 1970. In 1984 he received the British Society for Antimicrobial Chemotherapy's Garrod Medal and delivered its accompanying lecture.

After retirement he served as postgraduate dean for five years and adviser to the new Chinese medical school in Hong Kong. He was survived by his wife, Marjorie, a daughter and two sons (one a professor of oncology in Australia).

== Selected publications ==
His publications include:

- Influenza and Other Virus Infections of the Respiratory Tract, Edward Arnold & Co (1953)
- Medicine Today and the Role of Science in Medical Education (Wade foundation lecture), University of Southampton RGSE (1972)
- The Contribution of Virology to Contemporary Medicine: The Harveian Oration of 1974, Creative Press (1975)
- Influenza: The Viruses and the Disease, Hodder & Stoughton Ltd (1976)
