= Stewart Cole =

British microbiologist

Sir Stewart Thomas Cole KCMG FRS (born 1955) is a British-French microbiologist. He was the Director General of the Pasteur Institute since January 2018 to December 2023.

== Early life and education ==
Cole grew up in Wales, where he was educated at Milford Haven Grammar School and then at Ardwyn Grammar School, Aberystwyth. Following a life-threatening bout of paratyphoid he developed an interest in bacteria, viruses and infectious diseases, which led to his reading microbiology at the University of Wales, in Cardiff (now Cardiff University) followed by research for his PhD at the University of Sheffield, England. Subsequently, he was a postdoctoral fellow at the University of Umeå (Sweden) and a research assistant at the Max-Planck-Institut for Biology, Tübingen (Germany).

== Career and research ==
Stewart Cole has been active in infectious disease research and global health for many years. Between 2007 and 2017, he was a full professor and director of the Global Health Institute at the École polytechnique fédérale de Lausanne (EPFL, one of the two Swiss Federal Institutes of Technology). His laboratory at EPFL closed in December 2018. He was previously professor, senior vice president and scientific director of the Pasteur Institute in Paris (1983 – 2007), which he later rejoined as Director General.

His research accomplishments in microbiology have been widely acclaimed and are of direct relevance to global health and disease-control in both the developing world and the industrialized nations. Over four decades his team has investigated a range of topics including: bacterial electron transport systems; the genomics and diagnostics of retroviruses (HIV) and oncogenic papillomaviruses (HPV); antibiotic resistance mechanisms; and the molecular microbiology of toxigenic clostridia. Cole is best known for his pioneering work on the genomics, evolution and virulence of pathogenic mycobacteria, especially those causing the human diseases tuberculosis (TB), leprosy and Buruli ulcer.

Cole has supervised numerous students for MS and PhD degrees, and trained >50 postdoctoral fellows and clinicians. With them, he has published over 400 scientific papers and review articles. Notable alumni include Priscille Brodin, Bruno Canard, Roland Brosch, Stephen Gordon, Alexander Pym and Tim Stinear.

Cole is also an inventor on many patents, several of which were licensed to industrial partners giving rise to diagnostic and therapeutic products that have found direct application in human medicine and helped save lives.

Cole was scientific coordinator for the New Medicines For Tuberculosis project (NM4TB), running from 2006 to 2009 and the ensuing More Medicines For Tuberculosis project (MM4TB) running from 2011 to 2016 in the context of the FP7 European Union's Research and Innovation funding programme. This work led to the discovery of the TB drug candidate BTZ043 and PBTZ169 based on the benzothiazinone scaffold.

In 2014, EPFL mandated its spin-off iM4TB, (Innovative Medicines for Tuberculosis ) a not-for-profit foundation, to raise funds and undertake preclinical development of PBTZ169. This was achieved with support from EPFL and the Bill & Melinda Gates Foundation. Both BTZ043 and PBTZ169 completed phase 1 clinical trials and then entered phase 2a trials.

In 2019, Cole was appointed academic Scientific leader of the public-private initiative ERA4TB (European Regimen Accelerator for Tuberculosis). ERA4TB is developing new treatment regimens for TB and receives funding from the European Commission's IMI Antimicrobial Resistance (AMR) Accelerator.

== Director of the Pasteur Institute ==
Stewart Cole was appointed as the 16th director general of the Pasteur Institute on 13 October 2017, 130 years after its foundation, thus becoming the first non-French appointee. He took office on 2 January 2018, when he began to prepare the institute's Strategic Plan for 2019–2023. The overarching ambition of the Strategic Plan was to give new impetus to basic research at the institute and to increase its impact on human health. Priority areas of the Strategic Plan included (re)emerging infectious diseases, antimicrobial resistance, brain connectivity and neurodegenerative diseases. From the Strategic Plan it is clear that the four missions originally defined by Louis Pasteur for his institute - research, public health, training/education and translating research into applications of value to humanity - are as relevant today as they were in 1887 when the Pasteur Institute was founded. He completed his term on 31 December 2023.

In 2024 joined the Ineos Oxford Institute on antimicrobial research as Executive Chair and became President of the Pasteur Foundation - UK.

He was appointed Knight Commander of the Order of St Michael and St George (KCMG) in the 2022 New Year Honours for services to science.

== Awards and distinctions ==
- 2001: Prix Jean-Pierre Lecocq, Académie des Sciences, France
- 2002: Marjory Stephenson Prize from the Society for General Microbiology
- 2002: EMBO member
- 2004: Chevalier in the Ordre de la Légion d’Honneur, France
- 2007: Fellow of the Royal Society, UK
- 2009: Kochon Prize from the World Health Organization's STOP-TB Partnership
- 2014: Emil von Behring Prize from the University of Marburg
- 2014: Ass. Member National Academy of Pharmacy, France
- 2016: Gardner Middlebrook Award, 37th Annual Congress of the European Society of Mycobacteriology (3 July 2016; Catania, Italy).
- 2022: Knight Commander of the Order of St Michael and St George
- 2023: Honorary Doctor of Medicine, University of Sheffield
- 2024: Officier in the Ordre de la Légion d’Honneur, France
