= Lawrence Paul Garrod =

Garrod, Lawrence Paul (1895–1979), bacteriologist

Lawrence Paul Garrod (1 December 1895 - 11 September 1979), was a British bacteriologist who studied uses of penicillin. In 1929, he was a reader in the University of London and became professor of bacteriology in 1934, a post that he held until his retirement in 1961. He was a member of committees of the Department of Health, the Medical Research Council and World Health Organization.

The British Society for Antimicrobial Chemotherapy awards the Garrod Lecture and Medal in his name.
