= Harold Corby Kistler =

American professor of biology and plant pathology

Harold Corby Kistler is an American Adjunct Professor of biology and plant pathology at the University of Minnesota and a fellow of the American Phytopathological Society and the American Association for the Advancement of Science.

== Early life and career ==
Kistler obtained his B.S. degree in biology from Kent State University in 1975 and in 1983 got his Ph.D. in plant pathology from Cornell University. He was a postdoc at the University of Wisconsin and in 1985 joined the Department of Plant Pathology at the University of Florida. In 1999 he became a research geneticist at the United States Department of Agriculture-Agricultural Research Service and then became adjunct professor at the University of Minnesota. Dr. Kistler is known for his studies on Fusarium species and is an editor of the journal Microbiology and associate editor of journals such as Phytopathology and Molecular Plant-Microbe Interactions. He also has been chair of various APS committees including the Genetics Committee, Mycology Committee, and the Physiology, Biochemistry, and Molecular Biology Committee.

== Research ==
In 1998 Kistler along with Kerry O’Donnell, Elizabeth Cigelnik and Randy C. Ploetz had studied Panama disease of banana caused by F. oxysporum. Two years later, he partnered with Kerry O’Donnell, Beth K. Tacke and Howard H. Casper to study scab of wheat and barley which was caused by F. graminearum.

In 2007, Kistler led a team of scientists to sequence the genome of the fungal plant pathogen Fusarium graminearum, which causes Fusarium head blight disease on wheat and barley. This led to the discovery of highly polymorphic regions of the genome associated with pathogenic specialization.

== Fellowships ==
- Fellow of the American Phytopathological Society (2004)
- Fellow of the American Association for the Advancement of Science (2014)
