= St Bonaventure's =

Catholic secondary school in London, England

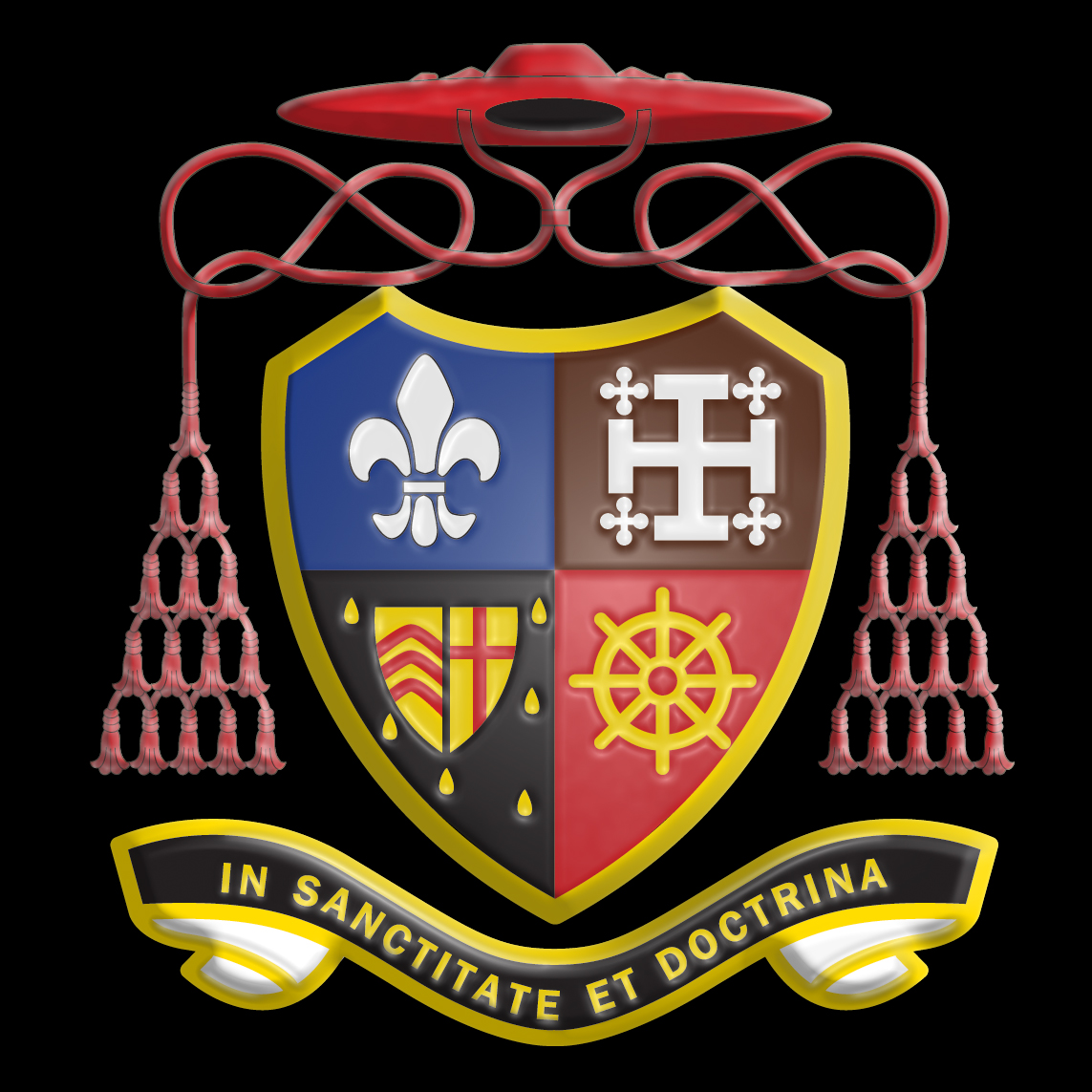

Location
- Boleyn Road; Upton, Forest Gate, Greater London, E7 9QD; England; 51°32′19″N 0°01′26″E

Information
- Type: VA, Teaching School
- Motto: In Sanctitate et Doctrina (In Holiness and Learning)
- Religious affiliation: Roman Catholic
- Established: 1877 (in Forest Gate)
- Founder: Franciscans
- Local authority: Newham
- Department for Education URN: 102787 Tables
- Ofsted: Reports
- Chair: Timothy Campbell
- Head teacher: Christopher McCormack
- Staff: 148 (approx.)
- Gender: Boys (girls in the sixth form)
- Age: 11 to 18
- Enrolment: 1,258 as of April 2016
- Houses: Atkinson, Bell, Colman, Forest, Gregory, Heath, Wall
- Colours: Brown, gold, red and black
- Diocese: Brentwood
- Former/current pupils: Bon's Boys
- Website: www.stbons.org

St Bonaventure's is a Roman Catholic boys' secondary school and sixth form in Forest Gate, London, England. The school was founded in 1875.

== History ==
St Bonaventure's was founded as a private Roman Catholic school in 1855, by members of the Franciscan order based in the Stratford area of London. They moved to the St Antony's parish of Forest Gate in 1897, when they needed more space to build a larger school. Before the outbreak of the Second World War and for some years thereafter pupils were drawn from a large part of the County of Essex as well as the whole of the County Borough of West Ham. Following the Education Act 1978 control of the school was taken over by the newly formed West Ham Education Authority and the school changed its name to West Ham (St Bonaventure's) Grammar School.

Following the Education Act 1944, the school reverted to full control by the Franciscan Order as a grammar school, and soon after that became a comprehensive school with a tripartite nature (on the site there were grammar, secondary modern and technical streams). At this time the title of the school changed to St Bonaventure's. The current school jumper reflects this past, as the three stripes of colour were initially used to identify the three types of student in the school.

The school has announced that it will celebrate its 150th anniversary on 15 July 2027, marking this historic milestone with a series of special events bringing together current students, alumni, former staff and the wider school community.

=== School patron ===
The school is named for St Bonaventure, a Doctor of the Church. Aged 29, he joined the Order of St Francis and promised to lead a life of poverty, chastity and obedience. He was made a cardinal by Pope Gregory X in 1273.

=== Grammar school ===
It became a state secondary school following the Education Act 1902 in 1904, when schools with a religious nature could gain access to public funding, then in 1918 changed its name to West Ham Grammar School. In 1944, it became St Bonaventure's Grammar School again. The school is linked with St Antony's Church, which is next to the site, and school masses are held there on a regular basis. It is governed by the Diocese of Brentwood and encourages and incorporates liturgical worship in all aspects of school life.

=== Comprehensive ===
The school was called a "multilateral" in the tripartite system of education in England, Wales and Northern Ireland in 1960 and became a boys' comprehensive for ages 11–19. The school gained Technology College status in 1994 and later Language College status. As a "high attaining school", it was also able to select a third specialism and chose applied learning.

=== Teaching school ===
Logo for the NCTL designated Teaching School St Bonaventure's and its alliance partners

The school was designated as a teaching school in February 2016. This means that the school has been judged as high performing and can take a lead role in training the next generation of school teachers, providing school to school support and supporting other teachers with their professional development. The school is part of the Agnus Dei Teaching School Alliance, with St Mary's University, Twickenham is the Higher Education Institute partner.

== Admissions ==
Most pupils are Roman Catholic; ethnic minorities represent the socio-economically deprived local catchment area. It is traditionally heavily oversubscribed for entry to year 7 and accepts 186 students each year.

== Headteachers ==
- Christopher McCormack (2019–present)
- Paul Halliwell, (2010–2019)
- Paul C. Doherty (interim; 2010)
- Stephen Foster (2003–09)
- Sir Michael Wilshaw (1985–2003)
- Owen Craddy (1974–85)
- Howard Docherty (1957–1974)
- Hugh Lawrence O'Connor (1949–1957)
- Charles Edward Gourley (1919–49)
- A. W. L. Harrison 1907–1920
- David Fleming 1885–
- Germain Verleyen 1873–

== Academic performance ==
The school performs well in the local and national league tables at GCSE level, and in 2026 over a third of the grades were 7 and above including 74% of students securing a good pass in English and Math.

As a Roman Catholic school, all pupils are entered for a compulsory GCSE in religious studies as well as English, maths and science. In 2005, the school became a language college, meaning that all pupils are also entered for a GCSE in a modern foreign language in French, Spanish or German.

At the end of year 9 students choose their options from a wide range of different GCSE subjects, including history, geography, PE, business studies, sociology, art, music and a selection of design technology subjects.

The school’s Sixth Form has consistently ranked among the top-performing sixth forms in Newham in recent years, with a record 35% of students progressing to Russell Group universities. In 2026, two-thirds of students achieved A*–B grades, further reflecting the school’s strong track record of academic excellence and success.

== Sport ==
In 1965 the school football team won the Thomas Lipton Trophy (London & S.E Schools Cup) winning the final 7–0 against Beaufoys at the Old Spotted Dog Ground. Over the past few years the school's football and basketball teams have reached numerous national finals, such as the London Cup Final in football and the Essex Cup Final in both football and basketball. The school's cricket team have also won the Newham Cup several times. Many representatives of the school's football team have become professional footballers.

=== Basketball ===
In 2008 St Bonaventure's became English Schools Basketball Association Under 14 boys national champions, and in doing so became the first team to achieve such a feat in the school's history. It repeated the feat in 2015, with the under 15 beating Holy Trinity and City of Leicester in the finals.

In 2016, St Bon's beat all previous English basketball records by all five year groups becoming Basketball England national champions. The year 7 competed in the Junior NBA winning the final on 22 March 2016. In September 2016, the school was accepted onto the elite Academy Basketball League (ABL) for post 16 due to the success of the school in all year groups below the sixth form.

=== Football ===
In 2013, the year 10 team won the Dewar Shield. In 2015, the year 9 football team became the under-14 Essex FA Jubilee Cup Champions

== Former pupils ==
Alumni of St Bonaventure's are known as Bonaventurians and informally as Bon's Boys.

- Chuba Akpom, footballer
- David Amess, British Conservative politician, MP for Southend West
- Chuks Aneke, footballer
- Charles Babalola, actor
- Alex Bailey, former footballer
- Phillip Butah, artist
- Timothy Campbell, The Apprentice 2005 series winner and businessman
- John Chiedozie, former footballer
- D Double E, musician
- Jermain Defoe, footballer
- Anthony Edgar, footballer
- Peter Fahy, former Chief Constable of Greater Manchester Police
- Edward Fennessy, electronics engineer, developer of the radar
- Desmond FitzGerald, Irish nationalist politician, father of Irish Taoiseach Garret FitzGerald
- Chris Hughton, former footballer, football manager
- John Junkin, actor
- Terry Lawless, boxing manager and trainer
- Stephen Mulhern, TV presenter and entertainer
- Glen Murphy, actor
- Billy Murray, actor
- Divin Mubama, footballer
- Bondz N'Gala, footballer
- DJ Randall, musician
- Talay Riley, musician
- Terror Danjah, musician
- Bobby Seagull, TV Celebrity & Mathematician
- Steve John Shepherd, actor
- Kiell Smith-Bynoe, actor
- Alex Stavrinou footballer
- Tinchy Stryder, musician
- Les Thompson, footballer
- Tony Trinci, microbiologist
