= Alex Stavrinou =

English footballer (born 1990)

Personal information
- Full name: Alexander Stavrinou
- Date of birth: 13 September 1990 (age 36)
- Place of birth: Harlow, England
- Height: 5 ft 6 in (1.68 m)
- Position: Midfielder

Youth career
- 2003–2009: Charlton Athletic

Senior career*
Years	Team	Apps	(Gls)
2009–2011	Charlton Athletic	0	(0)
2009–2010	→ Ebbsfleet United (loan)	22	(1)
2010	→ Cambridge United (loan)	11	(0)
2011–2012	Ebbsfleet United	7	(0)
2011	→ Lewes (loan)		
2012–2014	Cray Wanderers		
2014	Aveley		
2014–2015	Cray Wanderers		
2015–2016	Aveley		

International career
- Cyprus U17
- * Club domestic league appearances and goals as of 16:11, 25 March 2012 (UTC)

Alexander Stavrinou (born 13 September 1990) is an English professional footballer, who most recently played as a midfielder for Aveley.

Being of Cypriot heritage, he has represented Cyprus youth at international level.

== Career ==
=== Club career ===
Stavrinou started his career in the Charlton Athletic Youth Academy from the age of 13, rising through into the Reserves. In the 2008–09 season, he made 23 appearances for the under-18 team scoring once, and a further 12 appearances in the reserves. He signed his first professional contract for Charlton Athletic in June 2009. Stavrinou made his first-team debut for Charlton in their 1–0 away against Herford United in the League Cup on 11 August. Charlton manager, Phil Parkinson praised Stavrinou saying; "Alex Stavrinou came in for his debut and I thought it was an absolutely terrific performance". Stavrinou signed for Conference National club Ebbsfleet United on a one-month loan in November 2009, which was then extended to a season long loan where he won 'young player of the year' .

In October 2010, Stavrinou joined Cambridge United on a one-month loan deal. His loan was later extended until 9 January 2011. In May 2011, Stavrinou played for Aldershot Town in a reserve game against Brentford, losing 4–1. On 12 August 2011, Stavrinou signed for his former loan club Ebbsfleet United following a vote by members of My Football Club, which owned Ebbsfleet United, to increase the playing budget.

After finishing the 2013–14 season as player of the year at Cray Wanderers, he started the following season at Aveley. After a brief spell back with Cray Wanderers at the end of the year, he returned to Aveley in January 2015.

== International career ==
Although born in England, Stavrinou has represented Cyprus under-17, qualifying through his father's Cypriot heritage. Stravrinou was also approached to feature for Cyprus under-21, but stated at the time that he'd like to concentrate on his career with Charlton Athletic. He said; "They've spoken to my parents about possibly featuring for the U21s but as I've only got a year here I really need to be pushing on and focusing all my efforts on Charlton."

== Style of play ==
As a youth player, Stavrinou played as a centre back, before his under-16 manager Steve Avory converted him into a midfielder. Martin Ling described him as; "tenacious but also technical central midfielder who can do both sides of the game".

== Personal life ==
As a young man, he attended St Bonaventure's Catholic School in Forest Gate. After he was done with his job at Charlton Athletic he set up a sports company called Sporting4Schools. He is known for teaching PE lessons across London and Essex.
