= Malaysian Tamil diaspora =

The Malaysian Tamil diaspora refers to the global diaspora of Malaysian Tamil origin. It can be said to be a subset of the larger Malaysian and Tamil diaspora. Most of them settled in Singapore, Australia and North America.

A 2020 study found that the majority of the diaspora preferred to use the English language with their children as well as with other Malaysian Tamils.
