= Brian Duerden =

British microbiologist

Brian Duerden CBE
- Born: Brian Ion Duerden; 1948 (age 77–78)
- Education: University of Edinburgh
- Occupation: Microbiologist
- Employers: University of Edinburgh; University of Sheffield; Sheffield Children's Hospital; Cardiff University; Public Health Laboratory Service; Department of Health

Brian Ion Duerden CBE (born 1948) is a British microbiologist.

Duerden graduated from the University of Edinburgh in 1972, subsequently lecturing in bacteriology there. In 1979 he obtained his MD from the University of Edinburgh with a thesis entitled, “The characterization and occurrence of clinically important gram-negative anaerobic bacilli”. He then lectured at the University of Sheffield, where he was appointed Professor of Medical Microbiology in 1983, and became consultant microbiologist to Sheffield Children's Hospital.

In 1991, he moved to Cardiff University as Professor of Medical Microbiology and Director of the Public Health Laboratory, rising in 1995 to become Deputy Director and Medical Director of the Public Health Laboratory Service (PHLS) in England and Wales, its director from August 2002, until it was merged into the Health Protection Agency.

He became Inspector of Microbiology and Infection Control at the Department of Health in 2004.

He was Editor-in-Chief of the Journal of Medical Microbiology from 1982 until 2002.

He was made a Commander of the Order of the British Empire (CBE) in the 2008 Birthday Honours, "For services to Medicine and to Charity".
