= Journal of Medical Microbiology =

- Discipline: Microbiology
- Language: English
- Edited by: Norman Fry, Kalai Mathee

Publication details
- History: 1968-present
- Publisher: Microbiology Society
- Frequency: Monthly
- Open access: Hybrid, delayed, after 12 months
- Impact factor: 3.0 (2022)

Standard abbreviations
- ISO 4: J. Med. Microbiol.

Indexing
- CODEN: JMMIAV
- ISSN: 0022-2615 (print); 1473-5644 (web)
- LCCN: 75017868
- OCLC no.: 806481346

Links
- Journal homepage; Online access; Online archive

The Journal of Medical Microbiology is a monthly peer-reviewed medical journal covering all aspects of microbiology relevant to human and animal disease, including pathogenicity, virulence, host response, epidemiology, microbial ecology, diagnostics, etc., relating to viruses, bacteria, fungi, and eukaryotic parasites. It is published by the Microbiology Society and the editors-in-chief are Norman Fry (Public Health England) and Kalai Mathee (Florida International University). The journal publishes primary research articles, reviews, short communications, personal views, and editorials.

== History ==
The journal was established in 1968 and published by the Pathological Society of Great Britain and Ireland in conjunction with Lippincott Williams & Wilkins until 2001. From 1982 until 2002, the editor-in-chief was Brian Duerden.

== Abstracting and indexing ==
The journal is abstracted and indexed in:

- Biological Abstracts
- BIOSIS Previews
- CAB Abstracts
- Chemical Abstracts Service
- Current Contents/Life Sciences
- Embase
- Food Science and Technology Abstracts
- Index Medicus/MEDLINE/PubMed
- PASCAL
- Science Citation Index Expanded
- Scopus

According to the Journal Citation Reports, the journal has a 2022 impact factor of 3.0.
