= Donald Devereux Woods =

British microbiologist (1912–1964)

Donald Woods
- Born: 16 February 1912
- Died: 6 November 1964 (aged 52)
- Education: Trinity Hall, Cambridge
- Awards: Fellow of the Royal Society (1952)
- Scientific career
- Fields: Microbiology
- Workplaces: University of Oxford

Donald Devereux Woods (16 February 1912 – 6 November 1964) was a British microbiologist.

He was born in Ipswich, the son of Walter and Violet Woods, and educated at Northgate School, Ipswich. He entered Trinity Hall, Cambridge, graduating in 1933 and gaining a PhD there in 1937.

In 1939 he joined the Medical Research Council Unit for Bacterial Chemistry, working at the Middlesex Hospital, London. After World War II, during which he had been engaged on secret work, he became reader in Microbiology at Oxford University and in 1955 accepted the new Iveagh Chair of Chemical Microbiology there.

== Awards and honours ==
- 1952 Elected a Fellow of the Royal Society His nomination reads:
  Distinguished for work in Bacterial biochemistry; his demonstration (1940) of the antagonistic action of p-aminobenzoic acid against the antibacterial action of sulphonamides allowed him to propose the theory of competitive inhibition of essential metabolites by substances of similar constitution which has received world wide acceptance and has led to important advances in nutrition (folic acid) and design of inhibitory substances. Woods himself in 1940 undertook secret work which deprived him then of the power to follow up his discovery. Since the war however he has developed a school of microbiology in Oxford, actively engaged in folic acid and related studies.
- 1953 Marjory Stephenson Prize
