= Public Health Laboratory Service =

Defunct public health agency in England and Wales

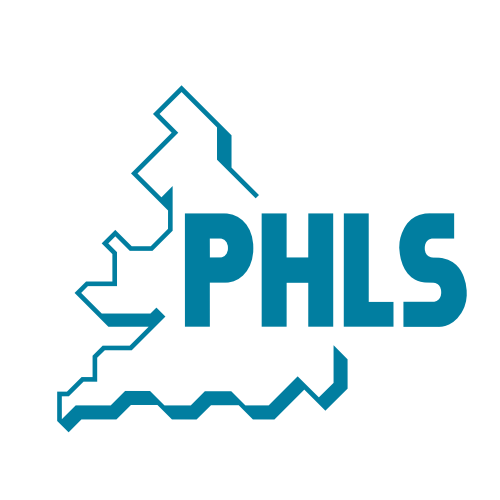

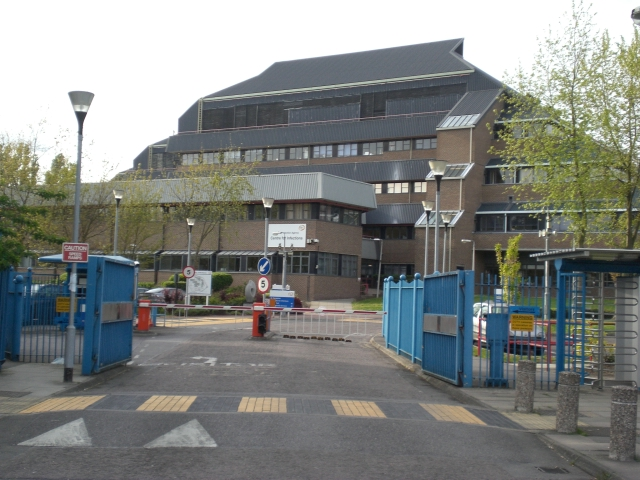
- The headquarters of the PHLS in Colindale, photographed here in 2009 after the absorption of the agency into the HPA.

Agency overview
- Formed: 1946
- Preceding agency: Emergency Public Health Laboratory Service
- Dissolved: 2003
- Superseding agencies: Health Protection Agency; Microbiological Research Authority
- Type: Executive Non-Departmental Public Body
- Jurisdiction: England and Wales
- Headquarters: Colindale, London Borough of Barnet
- Minister responsible: Alan Milburn (2003), Secretary of State for Health
- Deputy Minister responsible: David Lammy (2003), Minister of State for Public Health
- Agency executives: Roger Tabor (2003), Chairman of the Board; Brian Duerden (2003), Medical Director and Director of the Service
- Parent department: Department of Health
- Website: www.phls.org.uk (archived)

The Public Health Laboratory Service was the national public health laboratory for England and Wales from 1946 to 2003. Supervised by the PHLS Board, the service was responsible for communicable disease surveillance, detection, and control across England and Wales, with specific responsibility for High-Consequence Infectious Diseases. Headquartered in Colindale, the service was responsible for a network of 47 public health laboratories across the country, as well as maintaining the Central Public Health Laboratory and the Communicable Disease Surveillance Centre.

== History ==
The advent of public health laboratories in England took place in the early 20th century, when many hospitals and universities began to set up microbiology laboratories in the wake of advances in the understanding of the pathologic basis of disease. These labs began to fall under the purview of local Medical Officers of Health, the local authority officials responsible for public health matters, but continued to be fairly disparate until the advent of World War II; then, in response to concerns about the potential for biological warfare, many of these laboratories were brought under the auspices of the Emergency Public Health Laboratory Service in 1936, structured similarly to the succeeding PHLS, with a network of laboratories feeding into a central laboratory in Colindale. This network began to be used extensively by clinicians and public health professionals for all manner of work, and as a result, at the end of the war the network was maintained despite the lack of a biological warfare threat.

With the formation of the National Health Service, the modern Public Health Laboratory Service was established by the NHS Act 1946 as a body subordinate to the Medical Research Council, until in 1960 the service was established as a public body subordinate to the Ministry of Health.

From its formation, the PHLS was funded directly by the Ministry of Health (and its successors, the Department of Health and Social Security and the Department of Health) out of the Centrally Financed Services budget (as opposed to the Hospitals and Community Health Services budget), which quickly became an issue for the service, as the CFS budget was not routinely increased in line with inflation in the same manner that the HCHS budget was; as the number of tests the service was running expanded with advances in microbiology and increasing outbreaks, the PHLS was in a poor financial position, leading to tension between them and the Regional Health Authorities (which co-ran their peripheral laboratories) when the RHAs were expected to make up the shortfall or accept a reduction in service. These tensions, alongside the PHLS' financial issues, led to a review by the DHSS published in 1985, which recommended that the peripheral laboratories be wholly transferred to the RHAs, with the PHLS being left to manage their specialist central laboratories; this plan faced staunch opposition from trade unions, scientific groups, and many government officials, who argued that removing PHLS clinicians and scientists from the laboratories would significantly harm their ability to contribute epidemiological information, as they would become focused purely on providing routine clinical microbiology. As a result, and possibly also as a result of the importance of the PHLS in the response to the HIV/AIDS pandemic in the United Kingdom, health secretary Norman Fowler intervened, and the recommendations of the review were not implemented, maintaining the peripheral laboratories under joint PHLS-RHA control.

With the passing of the NHS and Community Care Act 1990 and the introduction of the health service internal market, major changes occurred in the organisation and funding of the PHLS; the service would move towards making most of their funding in the form of "selling" testing to health authorities, GPs, local authority health departments, and the Department of Health themselves, with the CFS funding stream being retained to fund the service's core public health functions, such as the CDSC and the epidemiology services. To this end, it was decided that the peripheral laboratories would come wholly under PHLS control; this required the unravelling of many of the complex cost-sharing agreements which had been established over the years, and meant that the PHLS now had to develop costings for their services, a task which was extremely difficult. Some have argued that these changes led to the introduction of stifling bureaucracy, degraded working relationships between the NHS and PHLS, and stifled the flow of epidemiological information to the service.

In 1994, the civil biological research component of the PHLS, the Centre for Applied Microbiology and Research, was separated from the service and formed the new Microbiological Research Authority, a separate non-departmental public body underneath the Department of Health.

== Organisation ==
The PHLS Board, established as an executive non-departmental public body, comprised 17 non-executive directors, with 5 committees reporting to it: the Finance and General Purposes Committee, the Ethics Committee, the Remuneration Committee, the Research and Scientific Strategy Committee, and the Audit Committee. This board provided oversight and strategic guidance to the PHLS Headquarters, consisting of the main Directorate, which hosted the scientific heads of the service, as well as the Commercial Management, Communications, Corporate Affairs, Finance, Human Resources, Resource Management, Technical Services, and Scientific Development divisions, as well as the Office of the Postgraduate Dean, who coordinated training for clinicians and scientists in the service.

The majority of the day-to-day work of the PHLS was performed by their network of peripheral laboratories, which in 2003 consisted of 47 laboratories organised into 8 regional groups: East, London & South-East, Midlands, North, North West, South West, Trent, and Wales. Each of these groups had a primary laboratory which fed information from the other spoke laboratories back to the PHLS Headquarters and central reference laboratories. In addition, the service contracted with 5 hospital laboratories in London and the South-East to draw on their expertise.

Prior to be being parcelled of under the MRA, the PHLS maintained the Special Pathogens Research Laboratory at Porton Down as part of the Centre for Applied Microbiology and Research; this BSL 4 lab was (and still is) the microbiological arm of the Imported Fever Service which was responsible for the diagnosis and surveillance of high-risk tropical diseases such as viral haemorrhagic fevers.

=== Central Public Health Laboratory ===
The CPHL, co-located with the PHLS' headquarters in Colindale, was (and to this day is) the chief reference laboratory for medical microbiology in the United Kingdom; it provided specialist services and advice to microbiologists, clinicians, and agencies across the country and handled dangerous pathogens at BSL 3 and 4 for diagnosis (except those sent to the Imported Fever Service at Porton Down) as well as uncommon pathogens which could not be identified and processed in normal hospital laboratories. The CPHL consisted of various divisions, sections, and units, including:

- Virus Reference Division
  - Enteric, Respiratory & Neurological Virus Laboratory
    - Respiratory Virus Unit
    - Enteric Virus Unit
    - Immunisation & Diagnosis Unit
    - Viral Zoonoses Unit
  - Sexually Transmitted & Blood Borne Virus Laboratory
    - Sexually Transmitted Viruses Unit
    - Blood Borne and Oral Viruses Unit
    - Evaluation & Quality Unit
    - Transmissible Spongiform Encephalopathies (TSE) & Neurological Viruses Unit
- Division of Gastrointestinal Diseases
  - Laboratory of Enteric Pathogens
    - Salmonella Reference Unit
    - Campylobacter Reference Unit
    - Helicobacter Reference Unit
    - Antibiotic Resistance / Molecular Epidemiology Unit
    - E. coli, Shigella, Yersinia & Vibrio Reference Unit
    - Special Projects Unit
  - Food Safety Microbiology Laboratory
    - Biotoxins Section
    - PHLS External Food Quality Assessment Schemes
    - Foodborne Pathogens Reference Unit
    - London Food, Water & Environmental Microbiology Laboratory
    - Water & Environmental Microbiology Reference Unit
- Division of Respiratory & Systemic Infection
  - Respiratory and Systemic Infection Laboratory
    - Haemophilus Reference Unit
    - Streptococcus & Diphtheria Reference Unit
    - Atypical Pneumonia Unit
- Communicable Disease Microbiology Services Support Division
  - Genomics, Proteomics & Bioinformatics Unit
  - PHLS Central Library
  - Medical Illustration Department
  - National Collection of Type Cultures
  - Quality Assurance Laboratory for the United Kingdom National External Quality Assessment Scheme for Microbiology
  - Quality Systems Unit
  - Molecular Identification Services Unit
- Division of Nosocomial Infection Prevention & Control
  - Antibiotic Resistance Monitoring & Reference Laboratory
  - Laboratory of Hospital Infection
    - Epidemiological Typing Unit
    - Infection Control Unit
  - Nosocomial Infection Surveillance Unit

=== Communicable Disease Surveillance Centre ===
The CDSC was the part of the PHLS largely responsible for epidemiology and the tracking of communicable disease outbreaks; headed by its own director, the centre would take the lead role in responding to sudden acute outbreaks of infectious disease supported by other parts of the PHLS and peripheral laboratories, in particular playing a central role in the surveillance and control of variant Creutzfeldt–Jakob disease in the context of the UK BSE outbreak, foot-and-mouth disease in the context of the 2001 outbreak, and preparing for bioterrorism in the context of the September 11th attacks and subsequent Global War on Terror. The CDSC itself had various divisions, including the Environmental Surveillance Unit (responsible for food and water pathogen surveillance), the Gastrointestinal Diseases Division, the HIV and STI Division, the Immunisation Division, the Healthcare-Associated Infection and Antimicrobial Resistance Division, the Respiratory Division (consisting of the TB, Influenza, Legionella, and Travel sections), the Information Management & Technology Division, and the 11 CDSC regions, including a branch in Northern Ireland.

== Closure ==
By the early 2000s, the poor financial situation of the PHLS was a recurring issue, and relations between the service and the Department of Health were tense; repeated restructuring of the service, including reducing the number of peripheral laboratories and attempting to cut central operating costs were not enough to allay government concerns around cost, all the while the funding sources available to the PHLS remained insufficient to meet their operating costs. In 2002, the Chief Medical Officer proposed the formation of a new agency responsible for the surveillance and control of communicable diseases alongside CBRN emergencies, in order to address concerns around the fragmentation of these capabilities across regions and between the local and national level. As a result, in 2003, the Health Protection Agency was formed, absorbing the central functions of the PHLS alongside other agencies such as the National Radiological Protection Board; the peripheral laboratories were transferred to local NHS trusts, and a clear separating line between everyday medical microbiology laboratories and public health laboratories was drawn.

The formation of the HPA and abolition of the PHLS was subject to significant criticism from many in the public health field. Very little warning was given to the PHLS Board as to their absorption into the HPA, and many felt that there was a lack of consultation and sense of rushing which was at odds with good public health policy. Similarly, the separation between clinical and epidemiological laboratories following 2003 was criticised by many; for example, Dr James Hughes of the CDC in the US said in a submission to a select committee "The flow of information between the public health and the clinical sectors will likely be reduced, as will the ability of public health agencies to leverage new information into changes in laboratory practice and policy on a broad scale". Indeed, the integrated nature of clinical and epidemiological microbiology resources was considered a strength of the PHLS by many. Some have linked the breakup of the public health laboratory network to deficiencies in the UK response to the COVID-19 pandemic.

== See also ==
- Public health in the United Kingdom
- National Radiological Protection Board
- National Focus for Chemical Incidents
- National Chemical Emergency Centre
- National Poisons Information Service
- Health Protection Agency
- Public Health England
- UK Health Security Agency
