= Mark Richmond =

British biochemist, microbiologist and academic

Sir Mark Richmond FRCP FRCPath FRS
- Born: Marcus Henry Richmond; 1 February 1931 (age 95); Sydney, Australia
- Education: Clare College, Cambridge
- Occupations: Biochemist; Microbiologist; Academic
- Employers: NIMR; University of Edinburgh; University of Bristol; University of Manchester; Glaxo

Sir Marcus Henry Richmond (born 1 February 1931) is a British biochemist, microbiologist and academic.

== Early life and education ==
Richmond was born in 1931, the son of H. S. Richmond, a film producer. He was educated at Epsom College from 1944 to 1949, and then studied biochemistry at Clare College, Cambridge, and remained there as a postgraduate for three years.

== Career ==
Following his doctorate he worked for the National Institute for Medical Research, subsequent to which he was a reader in molecular biology at the University of Edinburgh.

In 1968 he became Professor of Bacteriology at the University of Bristol, working on staphylococcal plasmids and antibiotic resistance. From 1980, he was Vice Chancellor of the University of Manchester and served for 12 years until 1992.

He became Global Head of Research for Glaxo in 1991.

He retired in 1996 and took up a position as Honorary Fellow in the School of Public Policy at University College London.

He served as chair of the Committee of Vice-Chancellors and Principals of the United Kingdom and of the Science and Engineering Research Council during his time at Manchester. Following formal retirement, he has been a non-executive director of several companies, including Genentech, OSI Pharmaceuticals and Ark Therapeutics.

== Awards and honours ==
He received the Robert Koch Medal in 1976, and the Biochemical Society's Colworth Medal. In 1982 he received the British Society for Antimicrobial Chemotherapy's Garrod Medal and delivered its accompanying lecture.

He was elected a Fellow of the Royal Society (FRS) in 1980 and was knighted in the 1986 Birthday Honours. He was also a Fellow of the Royal College of Physicians (FRCP) and a Fellow of the Royal College of Pathologists (FRCPath).

Academic offices
Preceded by Sir Arthur Llewellyn Armitage	Vice-Chancellor of The University of Manchester; 1980–1992	Succeeded by Sir Martin Harris
