= Marjory Stephenson Prize =

Prize of the Microbiology Society

- Awarded for: outstanding contribution of current importance in microbiology.
- Presented by: Microbiology Society
- First award: 1953

The Marjory Stephenson Prize is the principal prize of the Microbiology Society, awarded for an outstanding contribution of current importance in microbiology.

Marjory Stephenson was the second president of the Microbiology Society (1947 - 1949) and a distinguished pioneer of chemical microbiology.

== Recipients ==
Source: Microbiology Society

- 1953 Donald Devereux Woods, The Integration of Research on the Nutrition and Metabolism of Micro-organisms
- 1955 Cornelius Van Niel, Natural Selection in the Microbial World
- 1957 André Michel Lwoff, The Concept of Virus
- 1959 G.S. Wilson, Faults and Fallacies in Microbiology
- 1961 Bert C.J.G. Knight, The Growth of Microbiology
- 1963 M. Robertson, Some Aspects of the Protozoa and Their Way of Life
- 1965 Sir Christopher Andrewes, The Troubles of a Virus
- 1967 Sidney Reuben Elsden, Energy Relations and Fermentations, 1930–1967
- 1969 Jacques Monod, The Bacterial Cell as a Cybernetic System
- 1971 Ernest Frederick Gale, Don't Talk to Me about Permeability
- 1973 Renato Dulbecco, Cell Transformation by Viruses and the Role of Viruses in Cancer
- 1975 Ephraim Saul Anderson, Push Hard - or How to Promote Resistance
- 1977 Jean-Marie Ghuysen, The Concept of the Penicillin Target from 1965 until Today
- 1979 D. Herbert, These Narrow Engines...
- 1981 Patricia H. Clarke, Adaptation
- 1983 Milton R.J. Salton, From Walls to Membranes
- 1985 Peter Wildy, Little Fleas and Lesser Fleas
- 1987 David A.J. Tyrrell, The Common Cold - My Favourite Infection
- 1990 Paul M. Nurse (now Sir Paul), On Fission
- 1992 John R. Guest, Oxygen-regulated Gene Expression in E. coli
- 1994 Tony Trinci, Evolution of the Quorn Myco-protein Fungus Fusarium graminearum
- 1996 Keith Gull, Oneness and Otherness in Eukaryotic Microbes
- 1998 Rudolf Thauer, Biochemistry of Methanogenesis
- 2000 D. W. Holden, In vivo Genetic Analysis of Salmonella Virulence
- 2002 Stewart Thomas Cole, Comparative and Functional Genomics of Mycobacterium tuberculosis
- 2004 Stanley Falkow, Thoughts on Persistent Bacterial Infections
- 2006 Sir John Skehel, Invasion by Influenza Viruses
- 2008 Alan B. Rickinson, Studies with an Oncogenic Virus: How to Survive a Lifetime with EBV
- 2010 Jan Tommassen, Assembly of outer membrane proteins in bacteria and mitochondria
- 2012 Yuan Chang & Patrick S. Moore, Old Themes and New Variations in Human Tumor Virology
- 2014 Laura Piddock, Understanding the Basis of Antibiotic Resistance as a Platform for Early Drug Discovery
- 2015 Robin Weiss, What's the host and what's the microbe?
- 2016 Steve Oliver, Petri plates to Petri nets: the path to systems microbiology
- 2017 Stephen Busby FRS, Transcription activation in bacteria: ancient and modern
- 2018 Geoffrey L Smith FRS, Vaccinia virus: a portrait of a poxvirus
- 2019 Gordon Dougan, Putting Genomics into Action
- 2021 Martin C. J. Maiden, for translating basic science into practical public health benefits, especially vaccination, and food safety.
- 2023 Sharon Peacock for applying the sequencing of pathogen genomes to clinical and public health microbiology including of SARS-CoV-2.
- 2024 Maggie Smith for discoveries about bacteriophage.

In 1988, the Marjory Stephenson Memorial Lecture was renamed the Marjory Stephenson Prize Lecture. Copies of most of these lectures can be found on the Microbiology Society webpage

== See also ==
- List of biology awards
