= M. Viatilingam =

Malaysian footballer

Personal information
- Full name: Viatilingam a/l Murgeson
- Date of birth: 1952
- Place of birth: Kedah, Malaysia
- Date of death: 1 April 2012 (aged 60)
- Position: Left-back

Youth career
- Kedah FA

Senior career*
Years	Team	Apps	(Gls)
1968–1980an	Kedah FA	394	(2)
Total		394	(2)

International career
1973–1986	Malaysia	196	(0)
- * Club domestic league appearances and goals as of 20 January 2007

Viatilingam a/l Murgeson (c.1952 – 1 April 2012) was a former Malaysian football player. His name sometimes spelt as M. Viatilingam or M. Vittilinggam. He played as a left-back.

== Career ==
Viatilingam played for Kedah FA, starting in the youth team that contested the Burnley Cup from 1968 to 1970, and later for the senior team in Malaysia Cup tournaments from 1971 to 1984.

He also played for the Malaysia national football team, debuting in the 1975 SEAP Games. He was in the squad that played in the 1976 AFC Asian Cup in Tehran, Iran. The 1978 Asian Games was the last tournament he played for Malaysia.

He was known to his teammates as 'Mat Boeing' due to his speed, like the aircraft.

He was also a full-time staff at Lembaga Letrik Negara (currently known as Tenaga Nasional Berhad), along with his childhood friend and teammate in Kedah and Malaysia, Khor Sek Leng (later known as Mohd Azraai Khor Abdullah). He worked at LLN/TNB from 1972 to 2008.

== Death ==
Viatilingam died at Pantai Hospital, Penang on 1 April 2012 caused by brain tumor. At 60 years old at the time of his death, Viatilingam leaves behind his only son V.Thanabalan, as his wife had died 8 months earlier.
