= David Denning =

British physician

David W. Denning
- Education: Guy’s Hospital
- Known for: Founding president of the Global Action Fund for Fungal Infections
- Medical career
- Profession: Physician
- Field: Infectious diseases
- Institutions: Wythenshawe Hospital; University of Manchester
- Research: Fungal infection

David W. Denning is a British retired professor of infectious diseases and global health and medical mycology at the University of Manchester. He was the founding president, executive director and chief executive of Global Action For Fungal Infections (GAFFI) (2013-2023), which focusses on the global impact of fungal disease.

He became the director of the UK's National Aspergillosis Centre in Manchester, which treats people with chronic pulmonary aspergillosis (CPA), and led the group that produced the first guidelines for CPA in 2016. He retired from clinical practice in 2020.

== Career ==
David Denning studied medicine at Guy’s Hospital, London, and graduated in 1980. He then trained in internal medicine and infectious diseases in London and Glasgow. Between 1985 and 1987, he was a Senior Registrar in Infectious Diseases at Northwick Park Hospital and Medical Research Council research laboratories, before a three-year fellowship in diagnostic microbiology and infectious diseases at Stanford University, which he completed in 1990. He joined the University of Manchester as a Senior Lecturer in 1990.

He became a professor of infectious diseases and global health and medical mycology in 2005 at Wythenshawe Hospital and the University of Manchester. In 2009, he became the director of the UK's National Aspergillosis Centre in Manchester, which treats people with CPA.

In 2010, Denning was elected a Fellow of the Academy of Medical Sciences.

He is the founding president, executive director and chief executive of the GAFFI, which focusses on the global impact of fungal disease. Denning led the group that produced the first guidelines for CPA in 2016. He chairs the editorial board of a website which focusses on aspergillus and he leads an organisation which provides education on fungal diseases. Antifungal medications that he has contributed to research in include itraconazole, voriconazole, amphotericin B, caspofungin, and micafungin. He founded two spinout biotechnology companies. In 2020, he retired from clinical practice.

== Selected publications ==
- Denning, David W. (1998). "Invasive Aspergillosis". Clinical Infectious Diseases. 26 (4): 781–803. doi:10.1086/513943. JSTOR 4481476. PMID 9564455. S2CID 9183178.
- Herbrecht, Raoul; Denning, David W.; Patterson, Thomas F.; Bennett, John E.; Greene, Reginald E.; Oestmann, Jörg-W.; Kern, Winfried V.; Marr, Kieren A.; Ribaud, Patricia; Lortholary, Olivier; Sylvester, Richard; Rubin, Robert H.; Wingard, John R.; Stark, Paul; Durand, Christine; Caillot, Denis; Thiel, Eckhard; Chandrasekar, Pranatharthi H.; Hodges, Michael R.; Schlamm, Haran T.; Troke, Peter F.; De Pauw, Ben (8 August 2002). "Voriconazole versus Amphotericin B for Primary Therapy of Invasive Aspergillosis". New England Journal of Medicine. 347 (6): 408–415. doi:10.1056/NEJMoa020191. hdl:2066/185528. PMID 12167683.
- Denning, David W (October 2003). "Echinocandin antifungal drugs". The Lancet. 362 (9390): 1142–1151. doi:10.1016/S0140-6736(03)14472-8.
