= Microbiology (journal) =

- Discipline: Microbiology
- Language: English

Publication details
- Former name: Journal of General Microbiology
- History: 1947–present
- Publisher: Microbiology Society
- Frequency: Monthly
- Open access: Hybrid, delayed after 12 months
- Impact factor: 2.8 (2022)

Standard abbreviations
- ISO 4: Microbiology (Reading, Engl.)
- NLM: Microbiology

Indexing
- CODEN: MIBLAO
- ISSN: 1350-0872 (print); 1465-2080 (web)
- OCLC no.: 29693815

Links
- Journal homepage; Online archive

Microbiology is a monthly peer-reviewed scientific journal that covers research in all aspects of microbiology, including biochemistry, cell biology, molecular biology, developmental biology, physiology, pathogenicity, biodiversity, biotechnology, evolution, and genetics of microorganisms and their viruses. It also covers plant-microbe interactions and environmental and theoretical microbiology. The journal is published monthly by the Microbiology Society. It was established in January 1947 as the Journal of General Microbiology and obtained its current name in 1994. Since 2020, the editor-in-chief is Gavin H. Thomas (University of York), who took over from Tanya Parish (Seattle Children's), who served since 2015. The microbiologist and science writer Sir John Postgate FRS was editor from 1969 to 1974.

== Abstracting and indexing ==
The journal is abstracted and indexed in:

- BIOSIS Previews
- Current Contents/Life Sciences
- Science Citation Index
- Scopus

According to the Retrieved 2023-07-13, the journal has an impact factor of 2.8 (2-year Journal Impact Factor).
