= Ka. Kaliaperumal =

Malaysian author

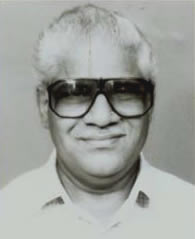
- Born: Ka. Kaliaperumal; 19 August 1937; Kampar Town, Perak, Malaysia
- Died: July 8, 2011 (aged 73); Buntong, Ipoh
- Resting place: Kampar City, Perak
- Other names: Sentamizh Kalainyer
- Occupation: Retired Tamil Teacher
- Employer: Malaysia Government
- Known for: Tamil Intellectual; Scholar; Motivational Speaker
- Spouse: Rugmani Loganayaki
- Children: Kalaiselvee; Kalaimathee; Kalaivani Kaliaperumal; Kalaimuthu; Kalaiyarasu; Kalai Mugilan

Dr. Ka. Kaliaperumal (19 August 1937 – 8 July 2011) was one of Malaysia's senior Tamil writers. He is the author of more than 80 Malaysian Tamil School books. He is the author of 100 over books on Tamil Grammar and Literature. He gave a formal Structure to Tamil Rituals in Malaysia.

He was awarded the “Tamilkuyilar” accolade by Pavender Bharathidasan in the 1960s. He lived with the honour until his death.

He created the compendium of Global Tamilar Culture. He received The Tokoh Guru Award, the Perak State Sultan Award, and the Teachers' Association's Thondamani Award. He received his doctor of Literature from the World University Roundtable, Arizona, U.S.A in 1989.

== As a writer ==
His first work was published in 1953 in the Tamil Murasu Maanavar Manimandram Magazine in Malaysia. He has authored more than 200 short stories, over 500 articles, and more than 300 poems, texts, and plays. His work has been published in Malaysian national newspapers and weekly magazines. He has written a series of articles and questionnaires in Malaysian national newspapers on language, religion and society.

The Malaysian Nanban daily wrote a question-and-answer section called “Bakthiyum Paguttharivum” (Devotion and Rationality).

== Tamilkuyil ==
He successfully ran the “Tamilkuyil” and “Aasiriyar Ohli” magazine.

== Malaysian Tamil Writers National Conference ==
In 1982, he created the "National Conference of Malaysian Tamil Writers" to unite with the state-wide Tamil Writers' Societies and Malaysian writers.

He served as the President of the Federation of Malaysian Writers' Societies. He is also the president of the State Writers Association of Perak State.

== Public works ==
He led the Tamil Aasiriyar Society and founded Vallalar Anbu Nilaiyam in Ipoh.

== Books ==
- Adipadai Tamil
- Chiruvar Sentamizh Kalaigiam
- Tamilar Thirumanam Muraigal
- Nittarkadan Neri Murigal
- Phonmani Sinthanaigal
- Tamilar Panpatu Kalaigiam (a collection of more than 1000 pages)

And many more books.

== Prizes and awards ==
He led the Tamil Aasiriyar Society and founded Vallalar Anbu Nilaiyam in Ipoh.

- Perak State Educational Portfolio 'Toko Guru' Award
- 'Thondarmani' Award from the National Association of Teachers of Malaysia Tamil School
- Penang Fellow Artist of the Year award
- Kuala Lumpur Tamil Sangam Award 'Thirukkural Mamani'
- Malaysian Tamil Writers Association “Thaninyayaka Adigal”Award
- Malaysian Swamy Spirit Award for 'Tamil Nerikuyil' Award
- Tamil Nesan 'Bowen Prize'
- Malaysian Tamil Writers Association
- 'Ketaiye Parisu' presented by Malaysian Tamil Writers' Association
- 'Ketaiye Parisu' presented by Swami Rama Dasar
- “Sentamizh Semmal” Awarded by Swami Kripananda Varior
- 'Senthhamizhi Vanar' Award - Awarded by Sithiyavan Thiruvalluvar Studios
- 'Thirukkural Mani' award - presented at the Raup Tamilar Sangam on Silver Festival
- 'Tamil Neri Kavalar' award, received from – Chennai Chilampu Selvar the Minister of Education
- PJK Award by the Sultan of Perak
- AMP award by the Sultan of Perak
- Bhavender Bharathidasan 'Tamilkulyar' award
