= Microbiology Society =

Learned society specialising in microbiology

- Microbiology Society
- Abbreviation: MicroSoc
- Formation: 1945
- Legal status: Not-for-profit organisation
- Location(s): London, EC1R United Kingdom
- Region served: Worldwide
- Members: 7000 microbiologists
- Chief Executive: Peter Cotgreave
- Main organ: Microbiology Society
- Website: www.microbiologysociety.org

The Microbiology Society (previously the Society for General Microbiology) is a society based in the United Kingdom with a worldwide membership based in universities, industry, hospitals, research institutes, schools and other organisations. Interests of its members include basic and applied aspects of viruses, prions, bacteria, rickettsiae, mycoplasma, fungi, algae and protozoa, and all other aspects of microbiology. Its headquarters is at 14–16 Meredith Street, London. The Society's current president is Professor Gordon Dougan CBE FRS.

== History ==
The society was founded on 16 February 1945 as the Society for General Microbiology. Its first president was Alexander Fleming. The Society's first academic meeting was in July 1945 and its first journal, the Journal of General Microbiology (later renamed Microbiology), was published in 1947. A symposium series followed in 1949, and a sister journal, the Journal of General Virology, in 1967. The society purchased its own headquarters in Reading in 1971, after initially sharing accommodation with the Biochemical Society in London. In 2014 the Society moved to Charles Darwin House, London, sharing the premises with several other learned societies. In 2015, the Society changed its name to the Microbiology Society, after its members voted in favour of the change. In 2019 the Society moved to its new headquarters at 14–16 Meredith Street, London.

== Activities ==
The Microbiology Society is a membership charity and a not-for-profit publisher. Its biggest event is its Annual Conference and it organises a number of scientific meetings across the discipline of microbiology as well as other membership activities including grants and professional development. The Society runs projects with its expert members to advance the understanding of microbiology in resolving global challenges. Its current major project in this area is Knocking Out Antimicrobial Resistance (AMR), an extensive scheme of work aiming to promote feasible and effective solutions to AMR.

The Society publishes eight titles:

- Access Microbiology
- International Journal of Systematic and Evolutionary MicrobiologyI
- Journal of General Virology
- Journal of Medical Microbiology
- Microbial Genomics
- Microbiology
- Microbiology Horizons
- Microbiology Outlooks

== Society Prizes ==
The Microbiology Society awards a range of prizes in recognition of significant contributions to microbiology.

The Prize Medal is awarded annually to an outstanding microbiologist who is a global leader in their field and whose work has had a far-reaching impact beyond the field of microbiology. The recipient receives £1,000 and usually gives a lecture to a meeting of the Society. The first medal was awarded to Stanley Prusiner and winners have included world-leading microbiologists from across the discipline.

The Marjory Stephenson Prize is awarded annually for an outstanding contribution of current importance in microbiology. The winner receives £1000 and gives a lecture on his/her work at a Society meeting. The lecture is usually published in a society journal. Marjory Stephenson was the second president of the Society (1947–1949) and a distinguished pioneer of chemical microbiology.

The Fleming Prize Lecture is awarded annually to recognise outstanding research in any branch of microbiology by a microbiologist in the early stages of his/her career. Sir Alexander Fleming was the first President of the Society (1945–1947) and received a Nobel Prize for his discovery of penicillin.

The Outreach and Engagement Prize is awarded annually to an individual for an outstanding contribution to microbiology outreach and/or engagement in order to stimulate interest and understanding in the subject.

The Translational Microbiology Prize Lecture is awarded annually to an individual who has demonstrated outstanding contribution to translational microbiology.

The Equality, Diversity and Inclusion Prize Lecture is awarded annually for good practice in and/or an outstanding contribution to initiatives that promote equality, diversity and inclusion in the microbiological community, and/or widen participation by those from historically marginalised communities, by raising awareness of microbiology and inspiring the next generation of microbiologists to pursue microbiology careers.

The Society awards the Early Career Microbiologist of the Year prizes annually to members presenting work at the Society's Annual Conference or Irish Division meeting. The prize recognises and rewards excellence in science communication by a member in the early stages of their career.

== Presidents ==
Source: Microbiology Society

- 1945–1947 Sir Alexander Fleming, FRS
- 1947–1948 Marjory Stephenson, FRS
- 1949–1952 J. Walter McLeod, FRS
- 1952–1955 Henry J. Bunker
- 1955–1957 Sir Christopher Andrewes, FRS
- 1957–1959 Sir Ashley Miles
- 1959–1961 Sir Frederick Charles Bawden, FRS
- 1961–1963 Reginald Lovell
- 1963–1965 David Willis Wilson Henderson, FRS
- 1965–1967 Percy Wragg Brian, FRS
- 1967–1969 Ernest Frederick Gale, FRS
- 1969–1972 Sidney R. Elsden
- 1972–1975 Sir David Gwynne Evans, FRS
- 1975–1978 Harry Smith, FRS
- 1978–1981 Peter Leete Wildy, FRSE
- 1981–1984 Roger Writtenbury
- 1984–1987 John R. Postgate, FRS
- 1987–1990 Derek Clissold Burke
- 1990–1993 J. Rodney Quayle, FRS
- 1993–1994 J. G. Jones
- 1994–1997 Anthony P. J. Trinci
- 1997–2000 Sir Howard Dalton, FRS
- 2000–2003 David Hopwood, FRS
- 2003–2006 T. Hugh Pennington, FRSE
- 2006–2009 Robin Anthony Weiss, FRS
- 2009–2012 Hilary Lappin-Scott
- 2012–2015 Nigel L. Brown
- 2016–2018 Neil A. R. Gow, FRS
- 2019–2021 Judith Armitage, FRS
- 2022-2024 Gurdyal Besra, FRS
