= British Society for Antimicrobial Chemotherapy =

British-based academic scientific society

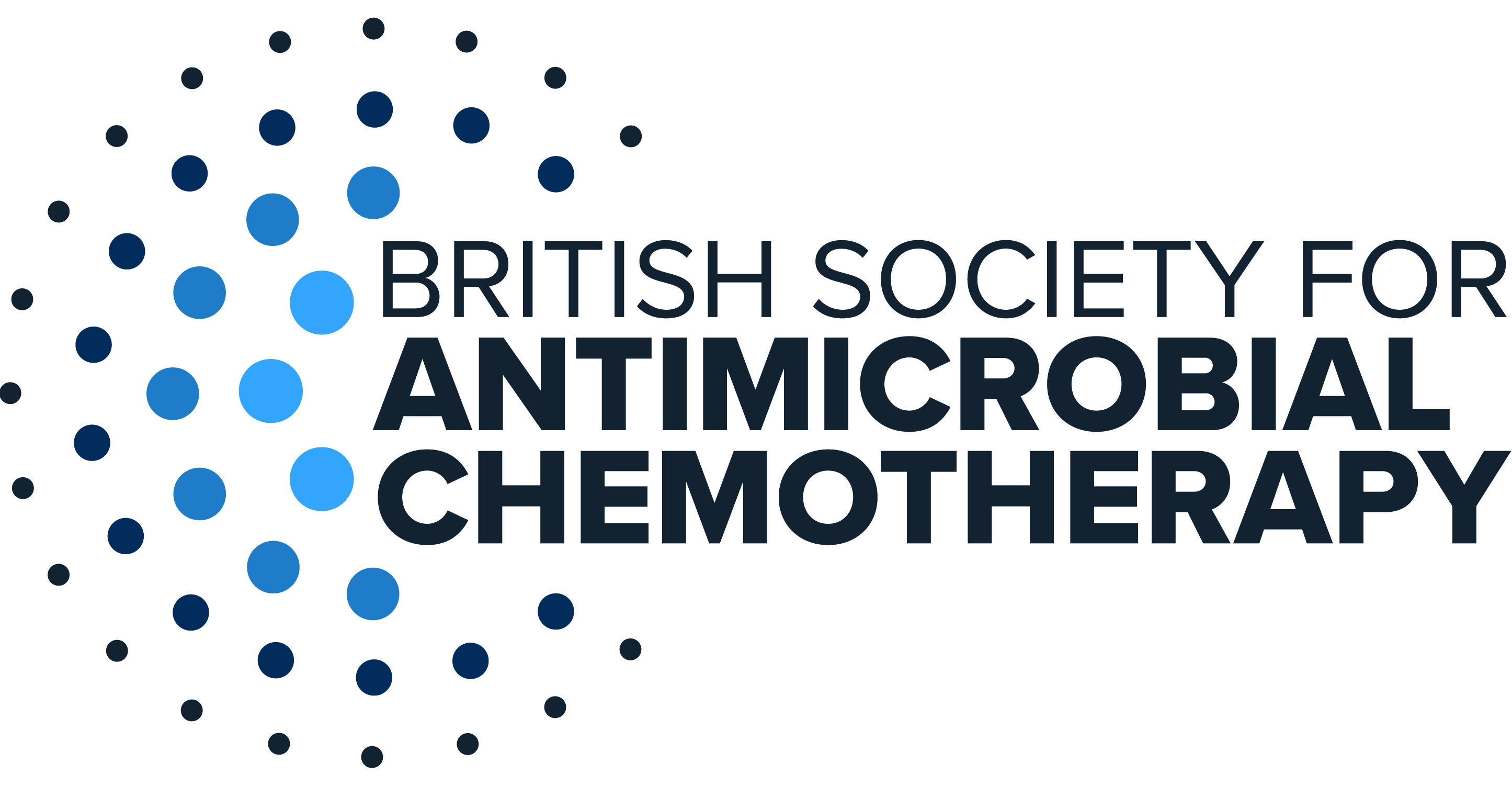
- Abbreviation: BSAC
- Formation: 1971
- Purpose: Working to prevent infectious diseases around the world
- Headquarters: Birmingham, United Kingdom
- President: Professor Andrew Seaton
- Former President: Dr David Jenkins
- CEO: Michael Corley

The British Society for Antimicrobial Chemotherapy (BSAC) is a UK-based multi-professional organisation that works to prevent infectious diseases and address drug-resistant infections.

On receiving BSAC's highest award, the Garrod Medal, in 2021, Dame Sally Davies, the UK's Special Envoy on Antimicrobial Resistance, commented: "For fifty years, BSAC have been at the forefront of the global fight against AMR...enabling communities globally to be more than the sum of their parts."

== Activities ==
BSAC has publishes the Journal of Antimicrobial Chemotherapy and its sister publication, JAC-AMR. The organisation also provides accreditation to hospitals as part of its Global Antimicrobial Stewardship Scheme (GAMSAS), a programme of work that was used as a case study in the Government of the United Kingdom's National Action Plan on antimicrobial resistance, ‘Confronting antimicrobial resistance 2024 to 2029’. Additionally, BSAC operates the out-patient parenteral antibiotic therapy (OPAT) Initiative, which works to develop good practice recommendations, a business case toolkit and a patient management system to support clinicians in the provision of parenteral antibiotics away from the hospital in-patient setting.

Former activities includes the BSAC Resistance Surveillance Project, a twenty-year undertaking in the systematic surveillance of antimicrobial resistance in infections of the blood (bacteraemia) and lower respiratory tract. The almost 100,000 isolates gathered during the project were subsequently transferred to the University of Dundee in partnership with the University of St Andrews and made available for further research.
