= David Lodge (scientist) =

British neuroscientist

David Lodge FRS FMedSci
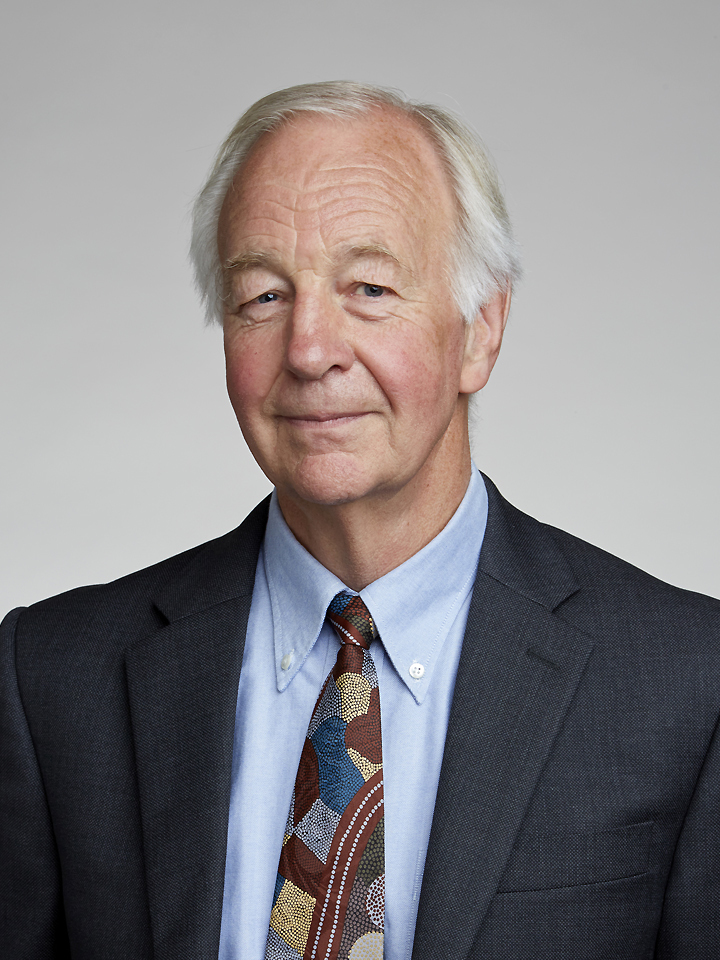
- Lodge in 2016
- Education: University of Bristol
- Scientific career
- Workplaces: University of Bristol; Royal Veterinary College; Eli Lilly and Company
- Thesis: [ProQuest 301323670 Neuropharmacological and physiological studies on central neurones in the rat] (1974)
- Doctoral advisor: Tim Biscoe
- Other academic advisors: David Curtis
- Website: www.bris.ac.uk/synaptic/people/david-lodge/

David Lodge is a research fellow in the Department of Physiology and Pharmacology at the University of Bristol.

== Education ==
Lodge was awarded a Bachelor of Veterinary Science degree in 1963 and worked in University of Bristol as a surgeon and anaesthetist, before doing postgraduate research with Tim J. Biscoe on the neuropharmacology of amino acids, he was awarded his PhD in 1974.

== Research and career ==
During postdoctoral studies at the Australian National University with David Curtis, he helped establish the role of glutamate as a central neurotransmitter and characterised its actions between AMPA, N-Methyl-D-aspartic acid (NMDA) and kainate receptor subtypes. At the Royal Veterinary College, Lodge linked his interests in anaesthesia and glutamate receptors by making the key discovery that the dissociative anaesthetics, ketamine and phencyclidine, selectively blocked NMDA receptors. He related NMDA receptor antagonism to psychotomimetic effects. This provided a basis for the glutamate hypothesis of schizophrenia and redirected pharmaceutical search for schizophrenia therapies. David was recruited as a director of Eli Lilly's neuroscience program, where he helped develop glutamate receptor approaches to brain diseases, resulting in clinical trials, e.g. for schizophrenia, some of which are ongoing. As of 2016, Lodge's research concerns the mechanism of action of new ‘legal highs’ and the consequences of spontaneous mutations in glutamate receptors.

== Awards and honours ==
Lodge was elected a Fellow of the Royal Society (FRS) in 2016 and a Fellow of the Academy of Medical Sciences in 2004. He was awarded a Doctor of Science degree from the University of Bristol in 2002.
