= James Prosser =

James Prosser may refer to:

- James I. Prosser (born 1951), professor of environmental microbiology at the University of Aberdeen
- James Wesley Prosser, country music singer
