= Paul Workman =

Paul Workman may refer to:

- Paul Workman (journalist), Canadian journalist
- Paul Workman (scientist) (born 1952), British scientist
