= Harry Gilbert =

Harry Gilbert may refer to:

- Harry H. Gilbert (1868–1909), Major League Baseball player
- Harry Gilbert (biochemist) (1953–2025), professor of agricultural biochemistry at Newcastle University

== See also ==
- Henry Gilbert (disambiguation)
