= Compston =

Compston is a surname. Notable people with the surname include:

- Alastair Compston (born 1948), British neurologist
- Archie Compston (1893–1962), English golfer
- Joshua Compston (1970–1996), British gallerist
- Martin Compston (born 1984), Scottish actor
- Peter Compston (1915–2000), Royal Navy officer
- Robert J. O. Compston (1898–1962), English fighter pilot
- William Compston (born 1931), Australian geophysicist
