= Adrian Hayday =

British immunologist (born 1956)

Adrian Hayday FRS FMedSci
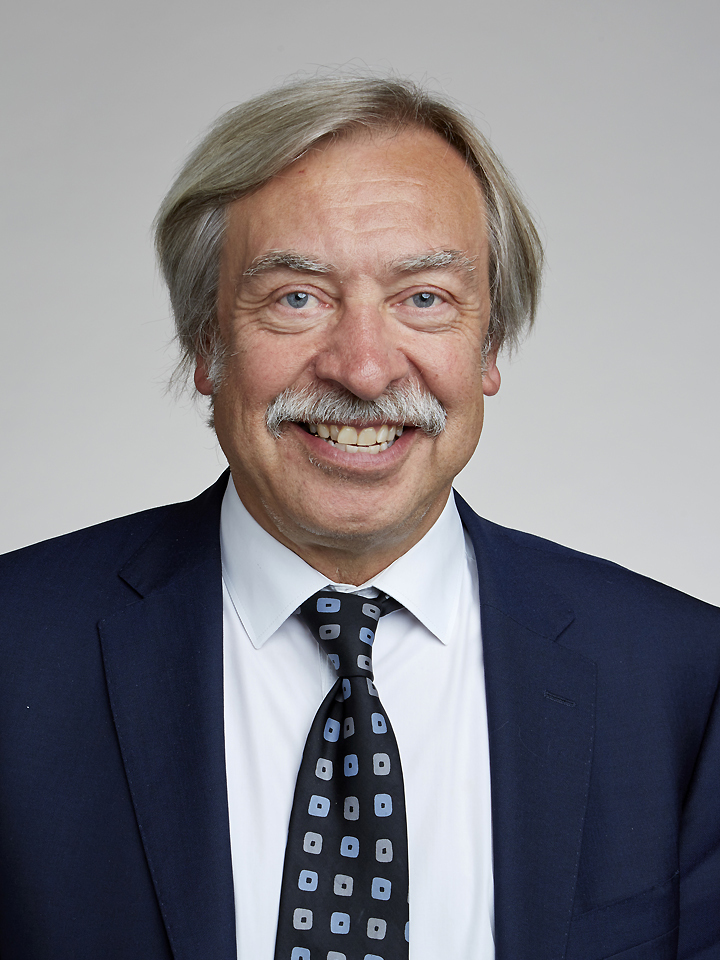
- Hayday in 2016
- Born: April 1956 (age 70)
- Education: University of Cambridge; Imperial College London
- Awards: FMedSci (2001); FRS (2016)
- Scientific career
- Fields: T cells; Immunosurveillance; Tumour immunology
- Workplaces: King's College London; London Research Institute; Francis Crick Institute; Yale University; MIT
- Thesis: Structure and activity of integrated polyoma viral DNA in transformed rat cells (1979)
- Academic advisors: Susumu Tonegawa; Mike Fried
- Website: crick.ac.uk/research/a-z-researchers/researchers-d-h/adrian-hayday/; www.kcl.ac.uk/lsm/research/divisions/diiid/departments/immunobiology/research/hayday

Adrian Clive Hayday (born April 1956) is a British immunologist who is the Kay Glendinning professor and chair in the Department of Immunobiology at King's College London and group leader at the Francis Crick Institute in the UK.

== Education ==
Hayday was educated at Queens' College, Cambridge, where he was awarded a Bachelor of Arts degree in natural sciences (biochemistry) in 1978. He went on to complete his PhD in molecular virology of Polyomaviridae at Imperial College London in 1982.

== Career and research ==
Hayday began studying immunology as a postdoctoral researcher in 1982 at Massachusetts Institute of Technology (MIT) supervised by Susumu Tonegawa, where he identified the molecular basis of oncogene activation in Burkitt's lymphoma. Thereafter, he first described the genes defining gamma-delta T cells, an evolutionarily conserved yet wholly unanticipated set of lymphocytes. At Yale University, King's College London School of Medicine and the Francis Crick Institute, Hayday established that gamma-delta T cells are distinct from other T cells, commonly monitoring body-surface integrity rather than specific infections. Their rapid responses to tissue dysregulation offer protection from carcinogenesis, underpinning Hayday's and others' ongoing initiatives to employ the cells for immunotherapy.

== Awards and honours ==
Hayday has received numerous awards, including the William Clyde DeVane Medal, Yale's highest honour for scholarship and teaching. He was elected to head the British Society for Immunology (2005–09), and has formally counselled King's Health Partners, the Pasteur Institute, Kyoto University, the Max Planck Institute, the Allen Institute, MedImmune, the National Institutes of Health, the Wellcome Trust, and Cancer Research UK whose science committee he chairs. He was elected Fellow of the Academy of Medical Sciences in 2001 and a Fellow of the Royal Society (FRS) in 2016. He is an honorary member of the British Society for Immunology.
