= Lloyd Evans (plant physiologist) =

New Zealand plant physiologist (1927–2015)

Lloyd Evans AO FRS FAA
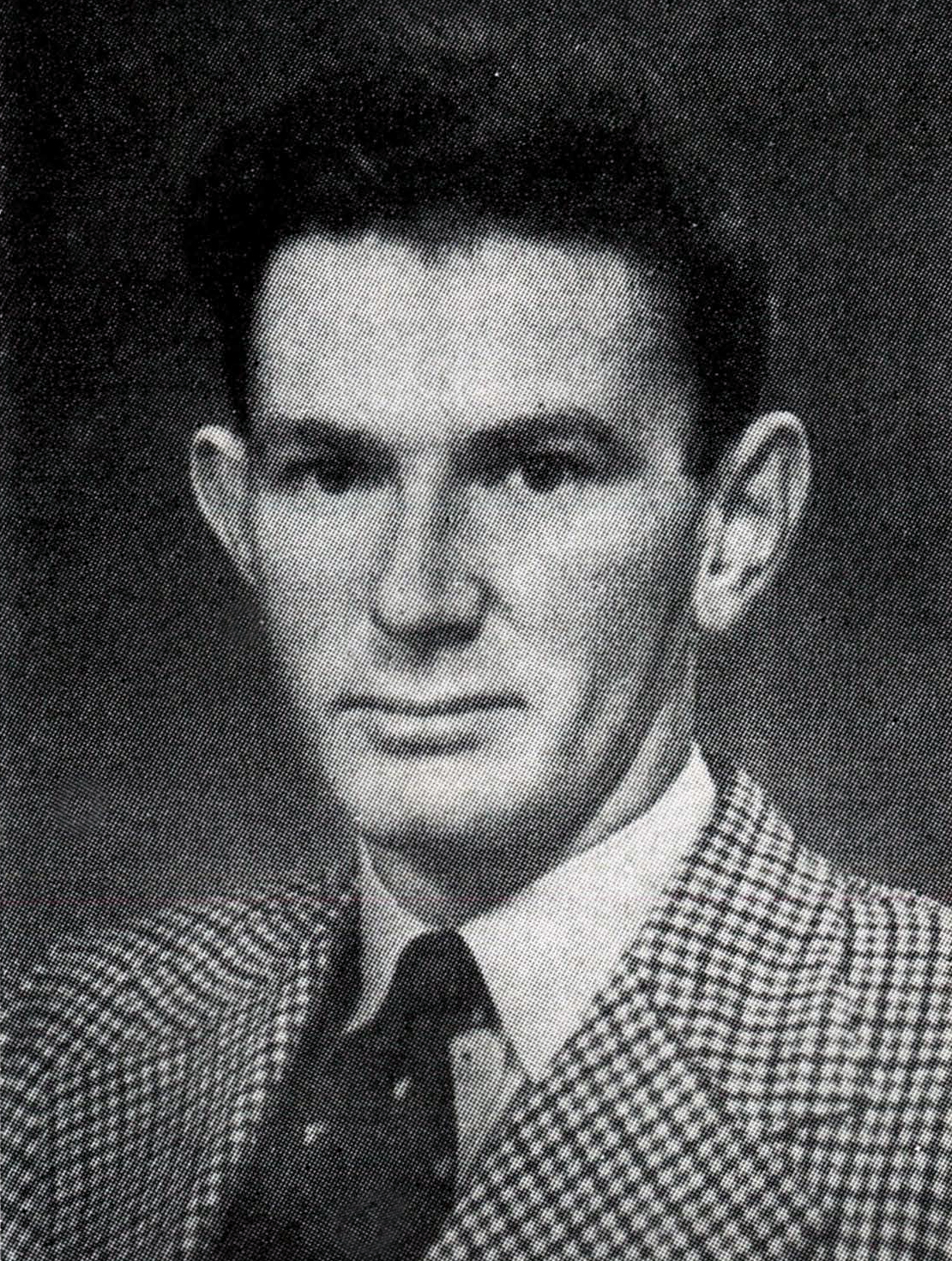
- Evans in 1951.

Personal details
- Born: Lloyd Thomas Evans; 6 August 1927 Wanganui, New Zealand
- Died: 23 March 2015 (aged 87)

Lloyd Thomas Evans (6 August 1927 – 23 March 2015) was a New Zealand plant physiologist who made his career in Australia.

== Early life and education ==
Evans was born in Wanganui in 1927. He received his secondary education at Wanganui Technical College and at Wanganui Collegiate School. He studied at the Canterbury Agricultural College in Lincoln from 1945 to 1950 and in 1947, he won the Hunter Brown Cup for that year's best essay on sheep husbandry. His 1950 master's thesis was on the ecology of the Lake Ellesmere flats. In 1948, he represented Lincoln at the Joynt Scroll, a debating competition between New Zealand universities; he also won that year's Hunter Brown Cup. He achieved first class honours in field husbandry and in 1950, he was a part-time lecturer in agricultural botany while completing his master's degree. In 1951, he was Lincoln's second Rhodes Scholar and went to Brasenose College, Oxford. He subsequently won a Harkness Fellowship to the California Institute of Technology, a fellowship to the National Academies of Sciences, Engineering, and Medicine to the United States National Agricultural Library in Beltsville, Maryland, and a research fellowship to Churchill College, Cambridge.

== Career ==
He was Chief of the Division of Plant Industry, at Commonwealth Scientific and Industrial Research Organisation, (CSIRO) from 1971 to 1978, and President of the Australian Academy of Science from 1978 to 1982.

== Awards and honours ==
- 1971 Fellow of the Australian Academy of Science (FAA)
- 1974 Bledisloe Medal
- 1976 Fellow of the Royal Society (FRS)
- 1978 Honorary doctorate of the University of Canterbury (LLD)
- 1979 Officer of the Order of Australia (AO)
- 2001 Centenary Medal

He was also a Fellow of the Norwegian Academy of Science and Letters.

== Selected publications ==
- Crop Evolution, Adaptation and Yield , Cambridge University Press, 1996, ISBN 978-0-521-29558-1
