= Patricia H. Clarke =

British biochemist

Patricia Clarke
- Patricia Clarke
- Born: Patricia Hannah Green; 29 July 1919; Pontypridd
- Died: 28 January 2010 (aged 90)
- Education: University of Cambridge
- Spouse: Michael Clarke (m. 1940)
- Children: 2
- Awards: FRS (1976); Leeuwenhoek Lecture (1979)
- Scientific career
- Fields: Biochemistry
- Workplaces: University College London

Patricia Hannah Clarke FRS (née Green) (29 July 1919 – 28 January 2010) was a British biochemist.

== Education and early life ==
Clarke was born in Pontypridd, South Wales, and was educated at Howell's School, Llandaff, from 1930 to 1937, before studying the Natural Sciences Tripos at Girton College, Cambridge, from 1937 to 1940.

== Career ==
After graduating, she declined a postgraduate post working on aspects of ATP metabolism to contribute to the war effort, taking post at the Armament Research Department of the Ministry of Supply in Swansea to work on explosives. She returned to biochemistry in 1944 when she joined the Wellcome Trust Research Laboratories at Beckenham, Kent. In 1951, she moved to work part-time at the National Collection of Type Cultures of bacteria in the Central Public Health Laboratory at Colindale, London.

She moved to the Department of Biochemistry at University College London, as Assistant Lecturer, being appointed Lecturer in 1956, Reader in 1966 and Professor of Microbial Biochemistry in 1973 until her retirement in 1984 – when she was made emeritus professor. During this time she co-wrote Genetics and Biochemistry of Pseudomonas. Her aim in this paper was to present in one volume the fundamentals, basic methodology, and specific applications of gas-liquid chromatography in microbiology and medicine. In addition to this, some of her papers include are Hydrogen Sulphide Production by Bacteria, An Inducible Amidase Produced by a Strain of Pseudomonas Aeruginosa, Biochemical Classification of Proteus and Providence Cultures and Butyramide-using Mutants of Pseudomonas Aeruginosa 8602 Which Produce an Amidase with Altered Substrate Specificity. Her major field of research was bacterial enzymes production and metabolism.

In retirement, she held positions of responsibility with the Society for General Microbiology, the Biochemical Society, the Science Research Council, and the Freshwater Biological Association.

== Awards and honours ==
- Elected a Fellow of the Royal Society (FRS) in 1976 and delivered their Leeuwenhoek Lecture in 1979.
- A. J. Klyver Lecturer, Dutch Society for Microbiology (1981)
- Marjory Stephenson Memorial Lecturer, Society for General Microbiology (1981)
- Vice-President of the Royal Society (1981-1982)
- Elected Fellow of the International Institute of Biotechnology (1986)
- Honorary doctorate, University of Kent (1988)
- Honorary doctorate, Council for National Academic Awards (1990)
- Elected Honorary Fellow of University College London (1996)
- Elected Honorary Member of the Society for General Microbiology (1997)

== Committee Work ==
Clarke was a great supporter of the Biochemical Society and the Society for General Microbiology (SGM) for their roles in education and fostering a scientific community. In 1974, she managed the production of a booklet, Careers in microbiology, which was published by the SGM to stimulate interest of microbiology in schools. In 1993, the she was one of six female members of the Committee of Women in Science and Technology commissioned by William Waldegrave. The committee's report, The rising tide, was published by the Cabinet office in 1994. The report drew attention to the areas adversely affecting recruitment and education of women in science; a lack of female role models in education, employers showing bad practice in ensuring opportunities for women and the poor approach to maternity leave.

== Personal life ==
In 1940, she married Michael Clarke; they had two children in 1947 and 1949. She died at University of Wales Hospital, Cardiff on 28 January 2010, aged 90 years.

== Collections ==
In 2002 Clarke donated her archive to University College London. The archive contains material relating to her own life and career (including publications, biographical items, and correspondence) and Clarke's advocacy for women in science.
