= Ramanujan Hegde =

British-Indian biochemist (born 1970)

Ramanujan Hegde FRS
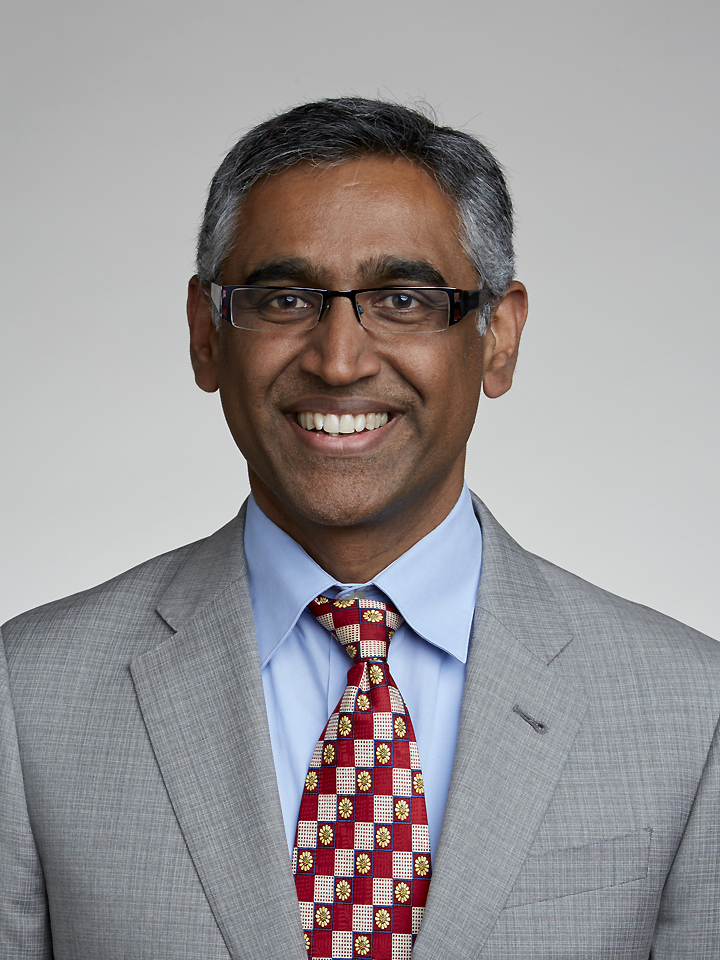
- Hegde in 2016
- Born: 1 April 1970 (age 56); Kumta, Karnataka, India
- Education: University of Chicago (BA); University of California, San Francisco (MD, PhD)
- Awards: EMBO Member (2013)
- Scientific career
- Fields: Biochemistry
- Workplaces: Laboratory of Molecular Biology; University of Cambridge; National Institutes of Health
- Thesis: The regulation of protein translocation at the endoplasmic reticulum (1998)
- Doctoral advisor: Vishwanath R. Lingappa
- Website: www2.mrc-lmb.cam.ac.uk/groups/hegde/; www2.mrc-lmb.cam.ac.uk/group-leaders/h-to-m/ramanujan-hegde/

Ramanujan Shankar Hegde FRS (born 1 April 1970) is a group leader at the Medical Research Council (MRC) Laboratory of Molecular Biology (LMB).Since 2019 he has led the LMB's Cell Biology Division.

== Education ==
Hegde was educated at the University of Chicago where he was awarded a Bachelor of Arts degree and the University of California, San Francisco where he was awarded a Doctor of Medicine (MD) degree in 1999 and PhD in 1998 for research on protein targeting and translocation at the endoplasmic reticulum supervised by Vishwanath R. Lingappa.

== Research and career ==
Hegde's research investigates how proteins are localised correctly inside cells, and how errors during protein maturation are recognised and disposed. These processes are important because the accumulation of abnormal proteins is disruptive to cell function, and underlies numerous diseases.

His laboratory have discovered a widely conserved protein targeting pathway needed by a subset of proteins to reach their correct membrane-embedded destination. Their studies of such protein targeting pathways are revealing how membrane proteins are accurately recognised by the machinery responsible for their proper localisation and insertion. Hegde's work has also shown that even modest failures of individual proteins to reach their correct cellular location can lead to neurodegeneration, and that cells have specialised pathways to identify these wayward proteins and target them for destruction.

As of 2016, according to Google Scholar his most cited research include papers published in Science, Nature, and Cell. His research has been funded by the Medical Research Council.

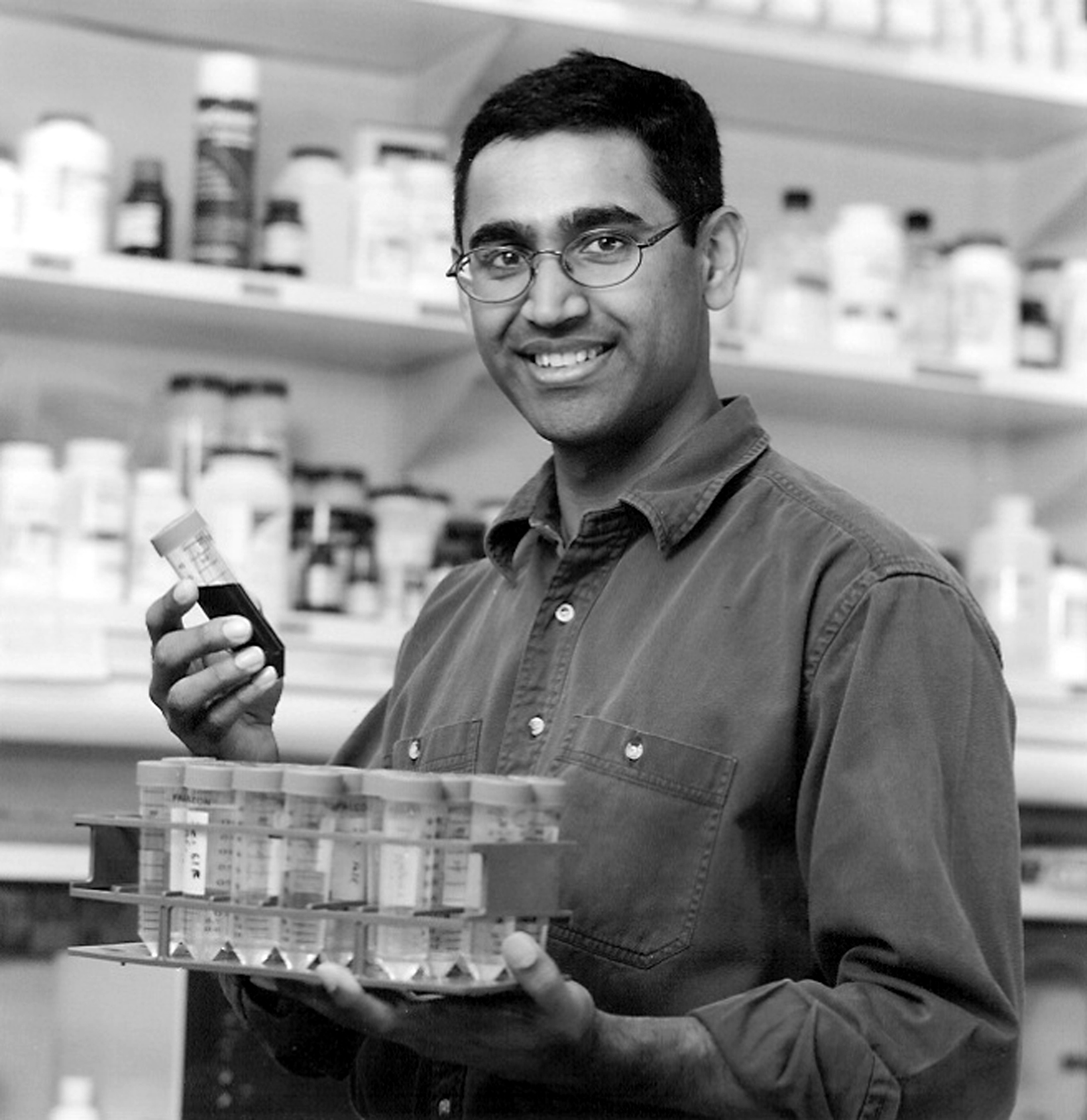
Ramanujan Hegde in 2001

=== Awards and honours ===
Hegde was awarded the R.R. Bensley award in Cell Biology in 2008 and elected a member of the European Molecular Biology Organisation (EMBO) in 2013. He was also elected a Fellow of the Royal Society (FRS) in 2016.
