= List of fellows of the Royal Society elected in 1976 =

This is a list of fellows of the Royal Society elected in 1976.

== Fellows ==
- Sir Ludwig Guttmann (1899–1980)
- William Watt (1912–1985)
- Peter Frederick Baker (1939–1987)
- Thomas Gerald Pickavance (1915–1991)
- Sir Karl Raimund Popper (1902–1994)
- Roger Wolcott Sperry (1913–1994)
- Henry Charnock (1920–1997)
- Edward George Gray (1924–1999)
- Elsie May Widdowson (1906–2000)
- Sir William MacGregor Henderson (1913–2000)
- Albrecht Frohlich (1916–2001)
- John Derek Smith (1924–2003)
- John Michael Hammersley (1920–2004)
- George Bellamy Mackaness (1922–2007)
- Roger John Blin-Stoyle (1924–2007)
- Seymour Benzer (d. 2007)
- Frank William Ernest Gibson (d. 2008)
- Leonard George Goodwin (d. 2008)
- Joseph Murdoch Ritchie (d. 2008)
- Hubert Rees (d. 2009)
- Sir James Whyte Black (d. 2010)
- Daniel Joseph Bradley (d. 2010)
- Patricia Hannah Clarke (d. 2010)
- Howard Harry Rosenbrock (d. 2010)
- Sir Frederick Edward Warner (d. 2010)
- Francis Gordon Albert Stone (1925–2011)
- Sydney Percy Smith Andrew (1926–2011)
- Robin Holliday (1931–2014)
- Sir Geoffrey Allen
- Peter Martin Biggs
- Sir John Ivan George Cadogan
- William Gilbert Chaloner
- Geoffrey Eglinton (1927-2016)
- Sir Roger James Elliott
- Lloyd Thomas Evans
- Sir John Harold Horlock
- Dan Peter McKenzie
- Walter Heinrich Munk (1917–2019)
- John Frederick Nye
- Stephen Joseph Robinson
- Stanley Desmond Smith
- Brian Arthur Thrush
- Charles Hard Townes
- Michael John Whelan
- Ronald Karslake Starr Wood
