= List of fellows of the Royal Society elected in 2016 =

This article lists fellows of the Royal Society who were elected on 29 April 2016.

== Fellows of the Royal Society (FRS) ==
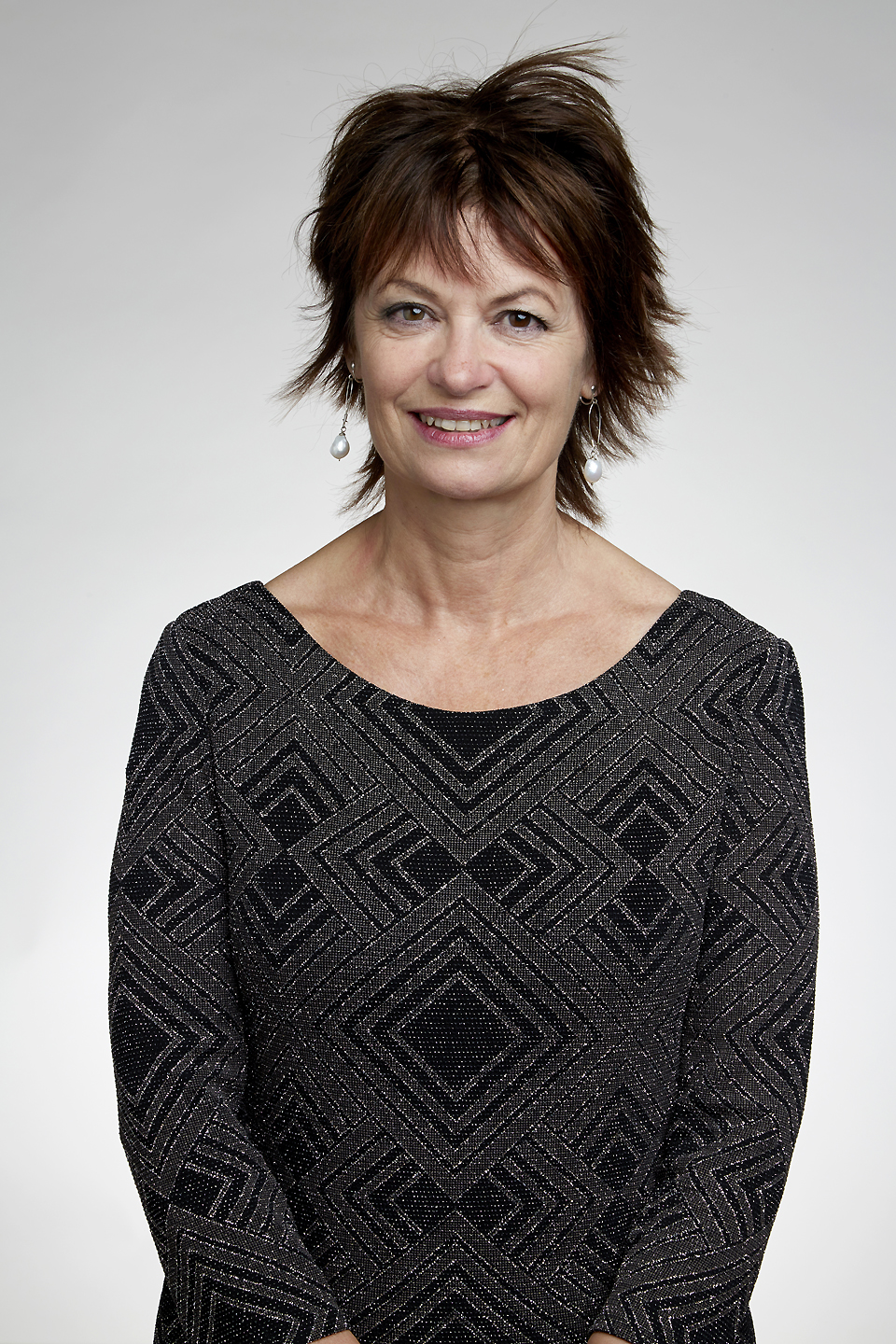
Dame Anne Glover FRS, biologist

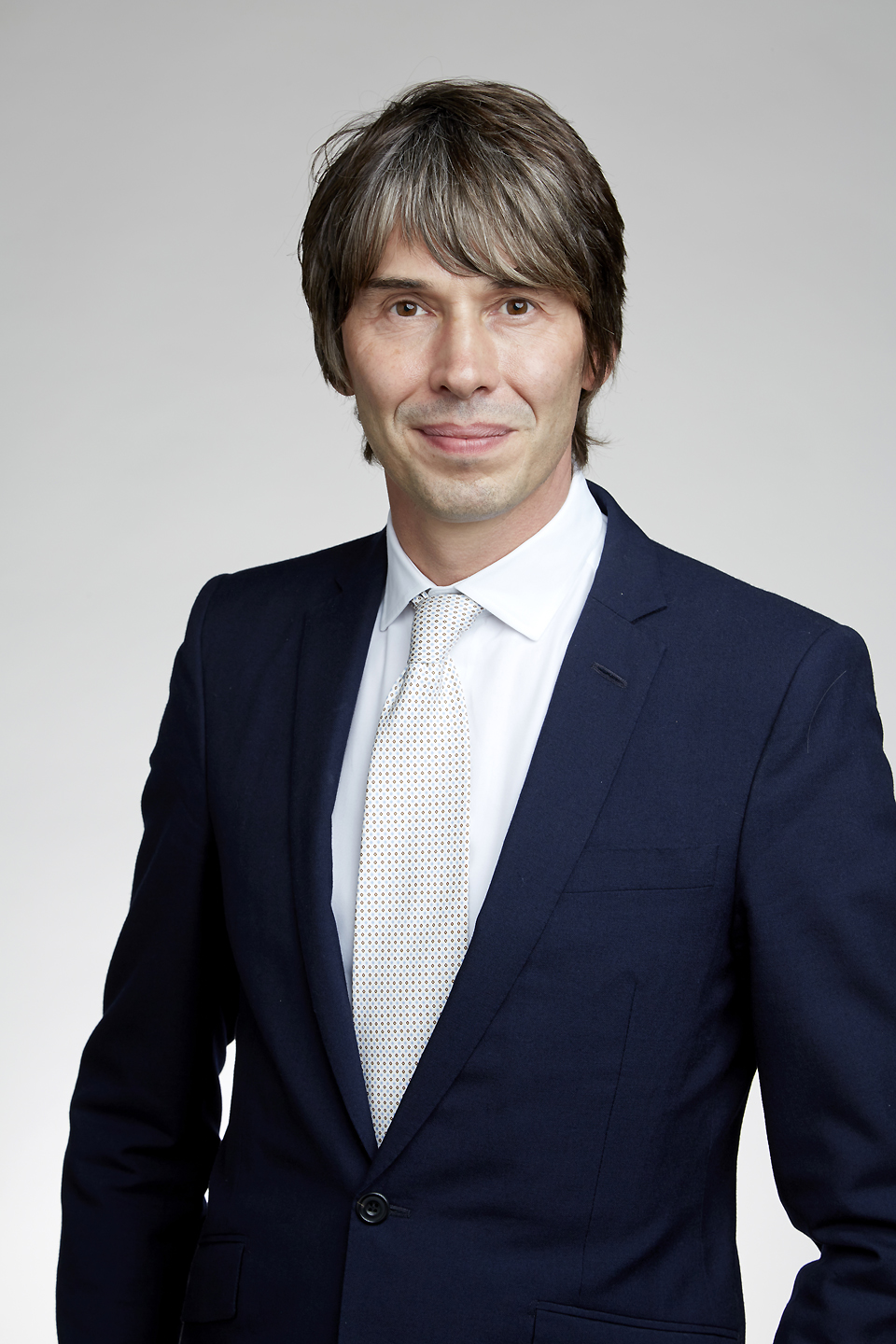
Professor Brian Cox FRS, physicist

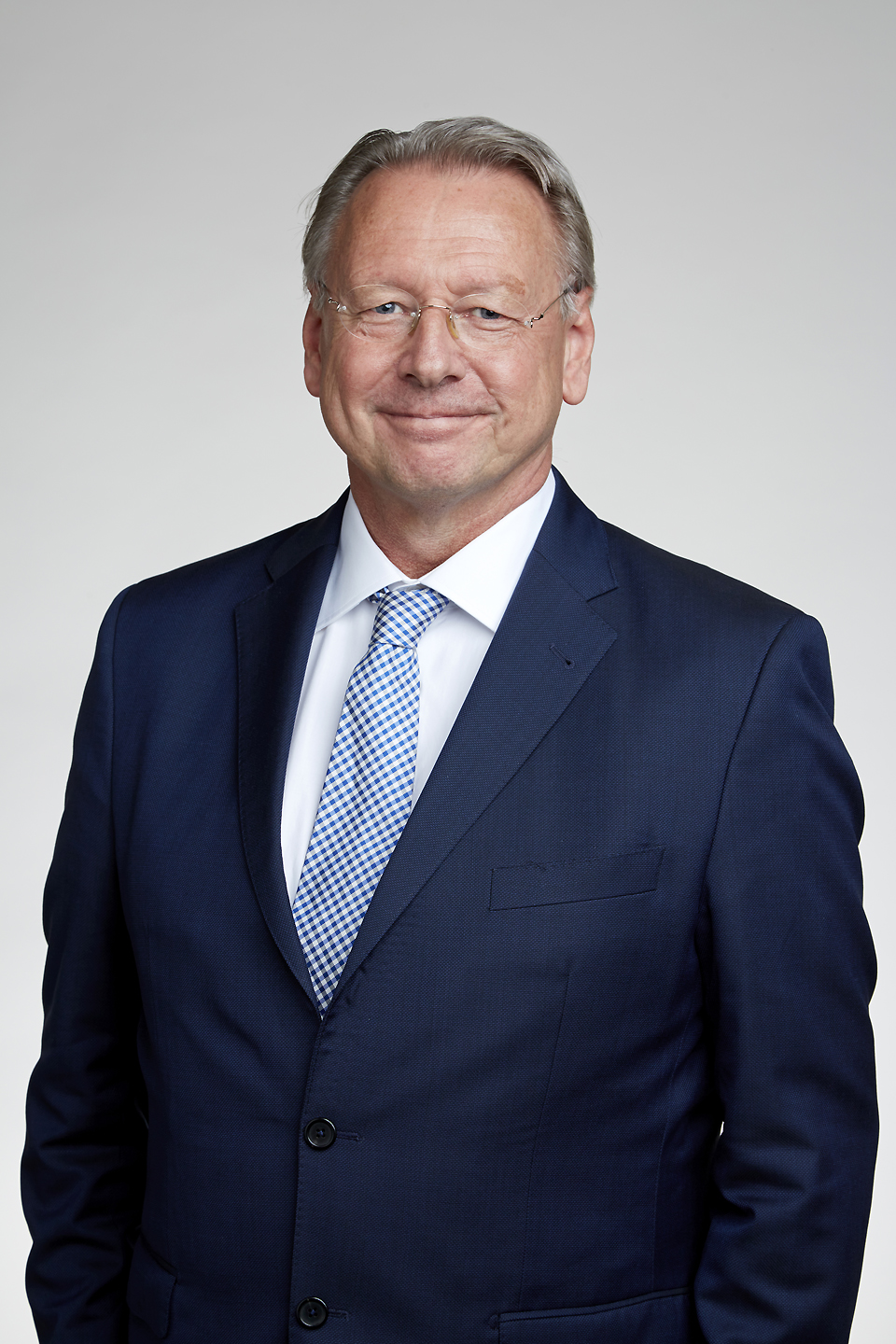
Professor Paul Workman FRS, pharmacologist

1. Chris Abell
2. Jas Pal Badyal
3. Steven Balbus
4. Polina Bayvel
5. Graham Bell
6. Martin Bridson
7. John P. Burrows
8. Katharine Cashman
9. Sarah Cleaveland
10. James Collier
11. Alastair Compston
12. Brian Cox
13. Jack Cuzick
14. William I. F. David
15. Christl Donnelly
16. Marcus du Sautoy
17. James S. Dunlop
18. Artur Ekert
19. Maria Fitzgerald
20. Antony Galione
21. Pratibha Gai
22. Harry J. Gilbert
23. Patrick Gill
24. Anne Glover
25. Neil A. R. Gow
26. Ian A. Graham
27. Richard P. Harvey
28. Adrian Hayday
29. Ramanujan Hegde
30. David Hight
31. Sue Ion
32. Eugenia Kumacheva
33. Corinne Le Quéré
34. Mark A. Lemmon
35. David Lodge
36. Eleanor Maguire
37. Lakshminarayanan Mahadevan
38. Gilean McVean
39. Russell E. Morris
40. Luke O'Neill
41. Simon Peyton Jones
42. Jonathon Pines
43. James I. Prosser
44. Sriram Ramaswamy
45. Caroline Series
46. Ted Shepherd
47. Alison Mary Smith
48. David J. Wales
49. Philip J. Withers
50. Paul Workman

== Honorary fellows ==
1. Adair Turner, Baron Turner of Ecchinswell

== Foreign members ==
1. Robert Cava
2. Vint Cerf
3. Mark M. Davis
4. Jennifer Doudna
5. Gerd Faltings
6. John M. Hayes
7. Svante Pääbo
8. Pasko Rakic
9. Rino Rappuoli
10. Ellen D. Williams

== Gallery ==
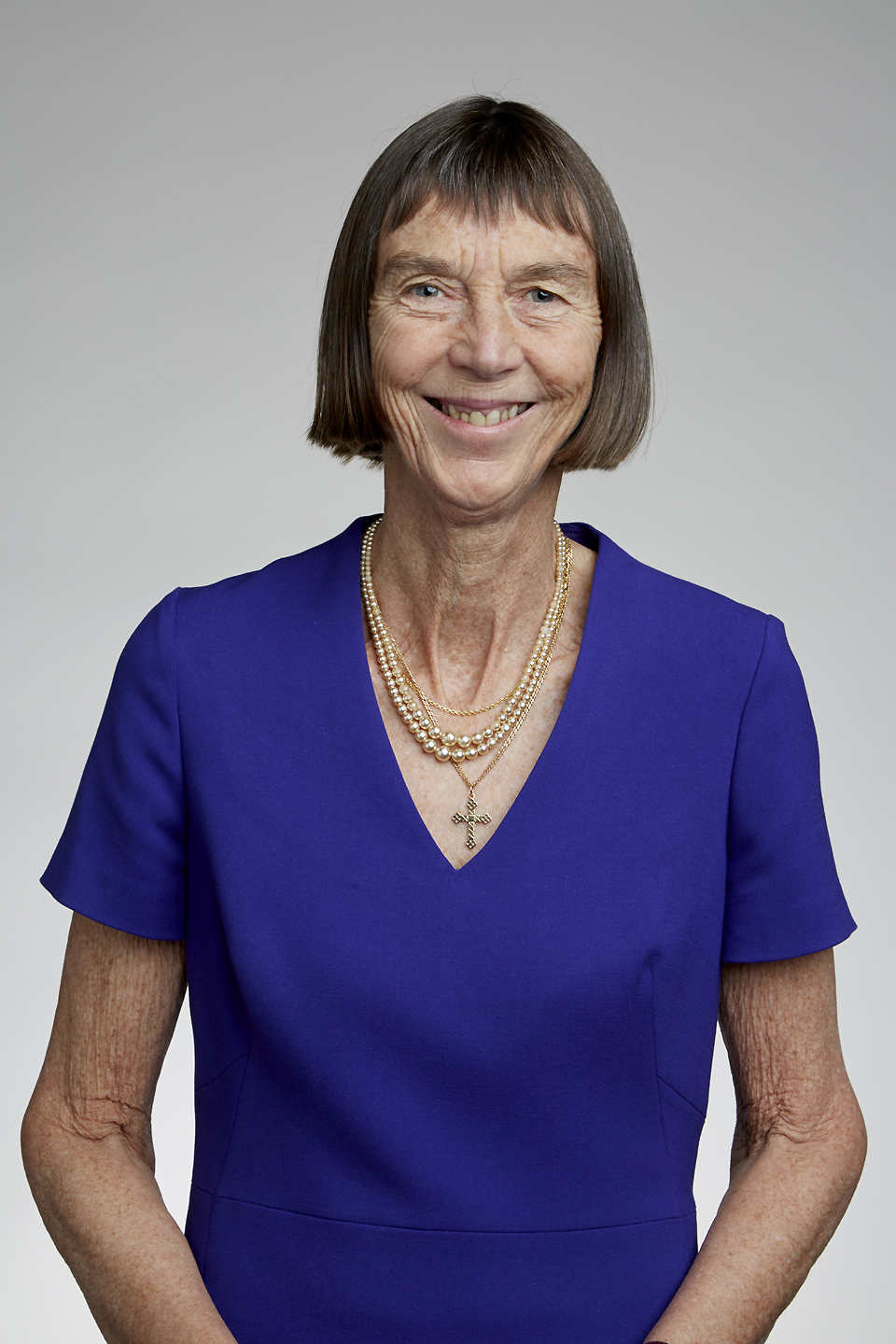
Dame Sue Ion FRS, engineer

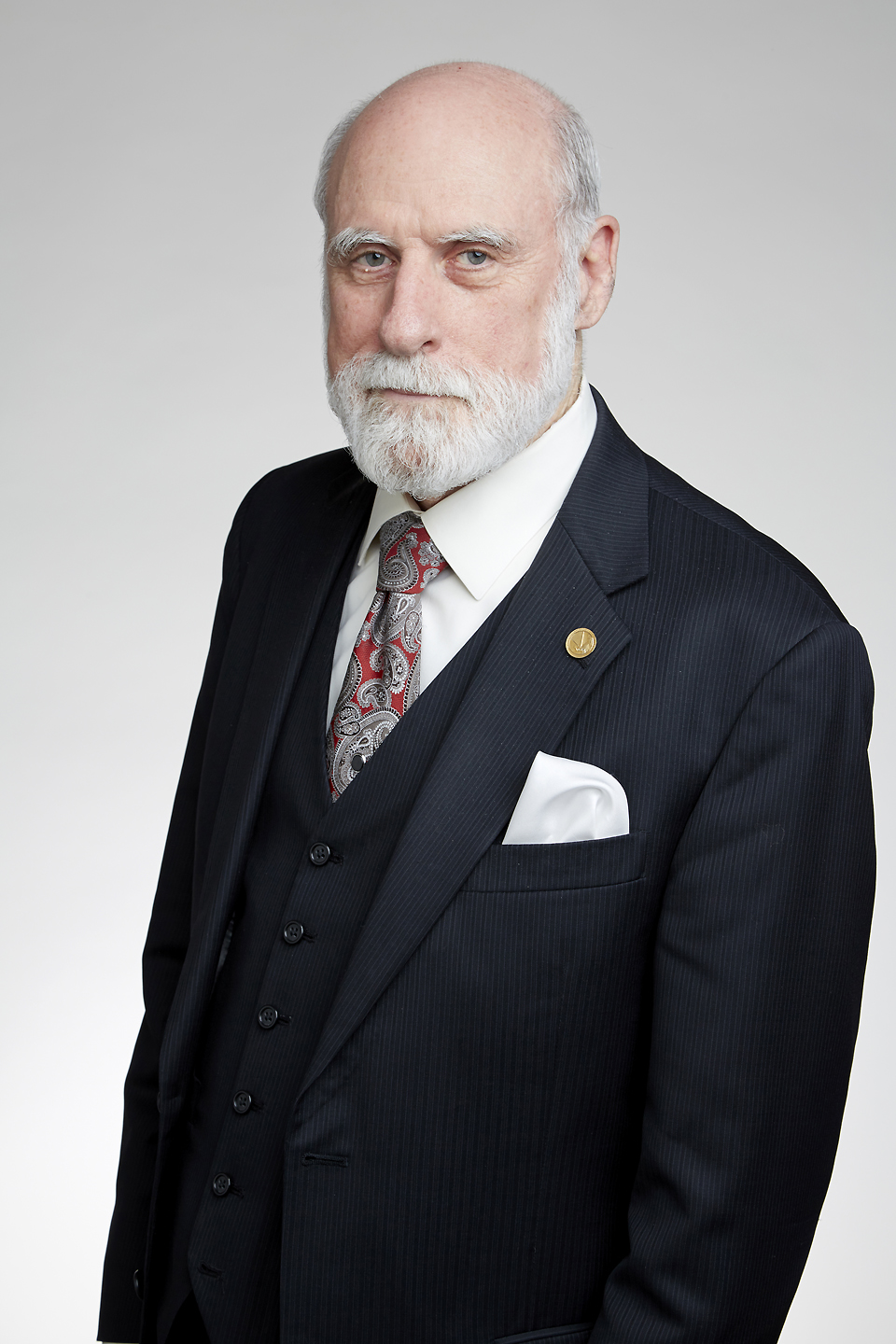
Vint Cerf ForMemRS, engineer

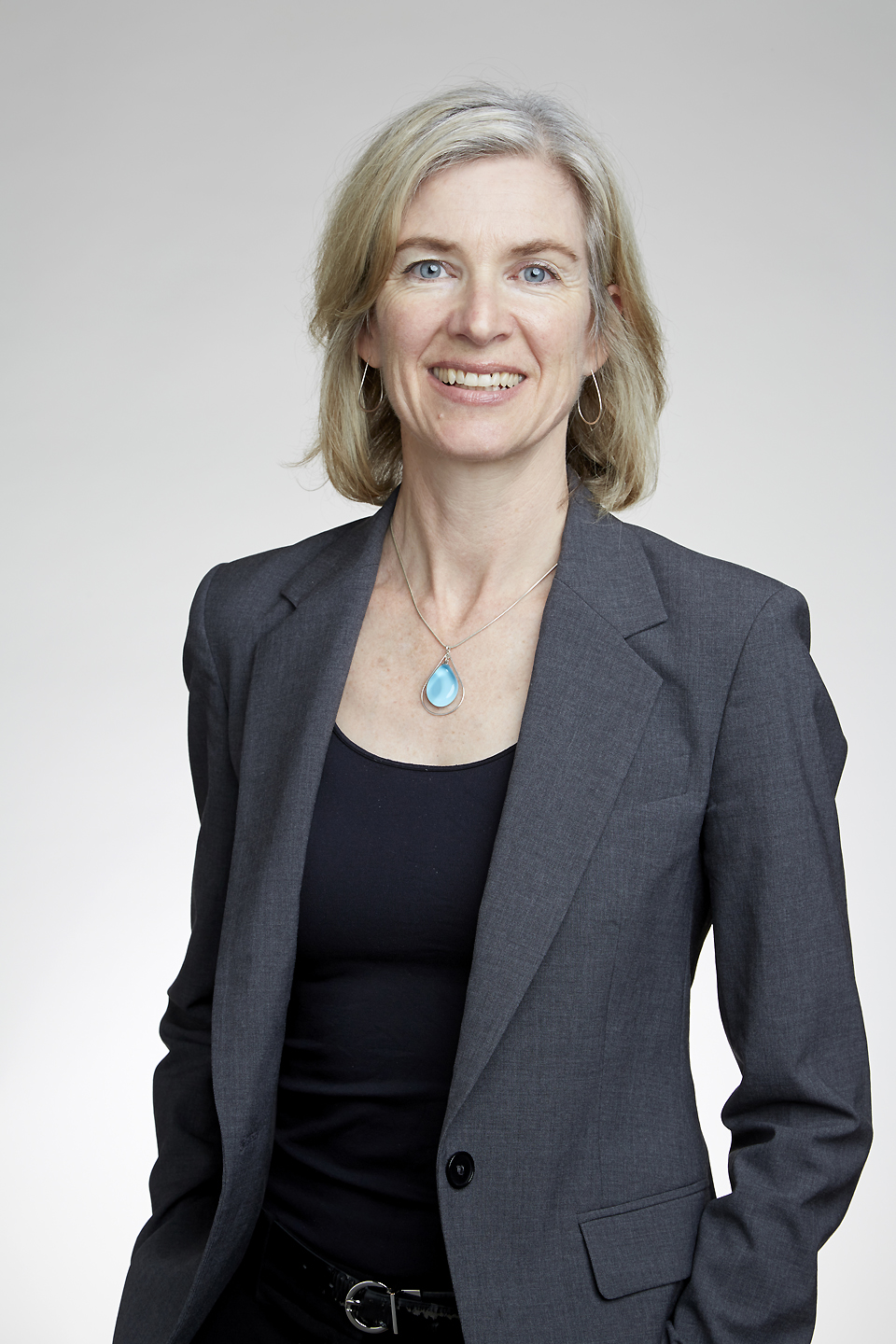
Professor Jennifer Doudna, ForMemRS, biochemist

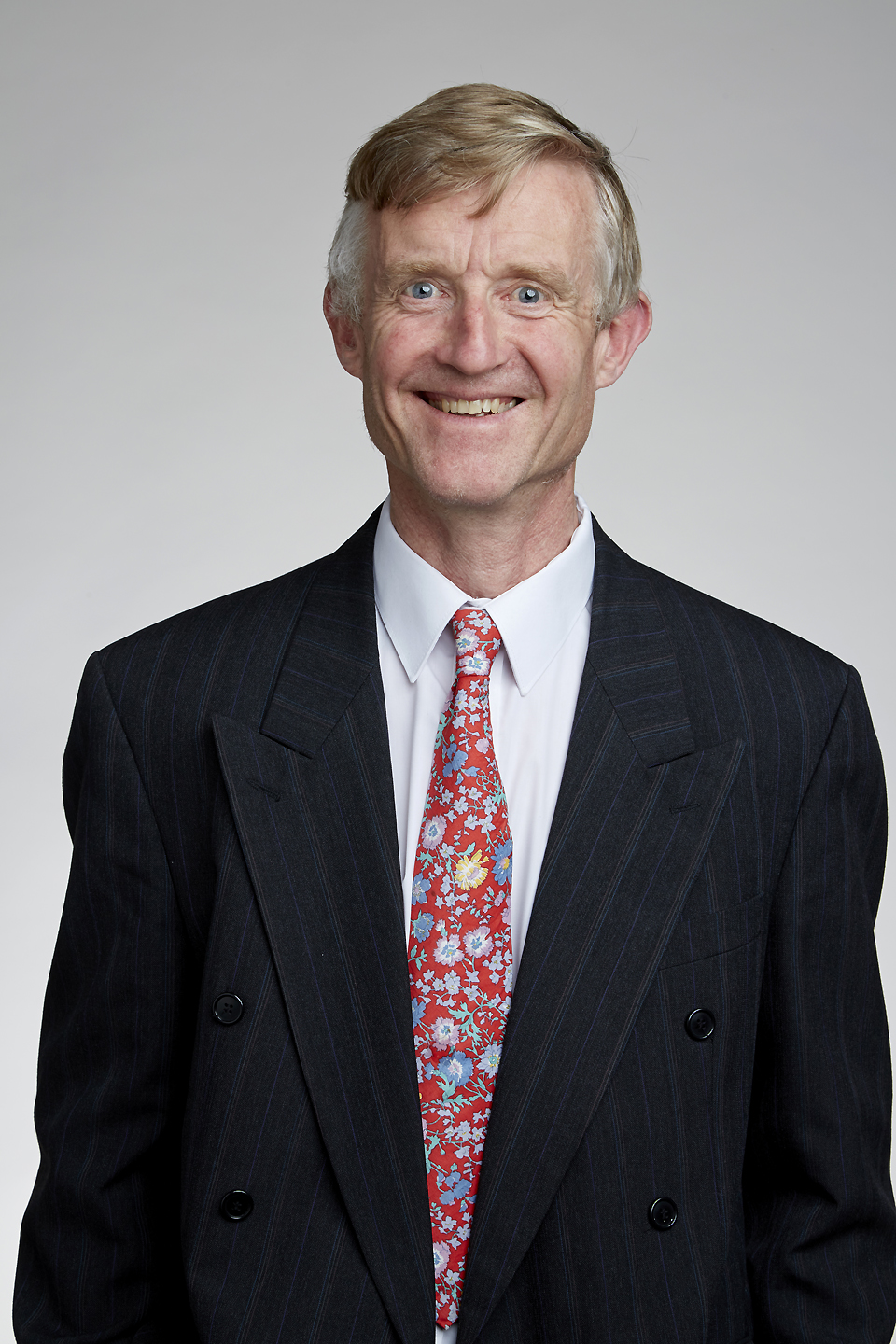
Professor Simon Peyton Jones, FRS, computer scientist

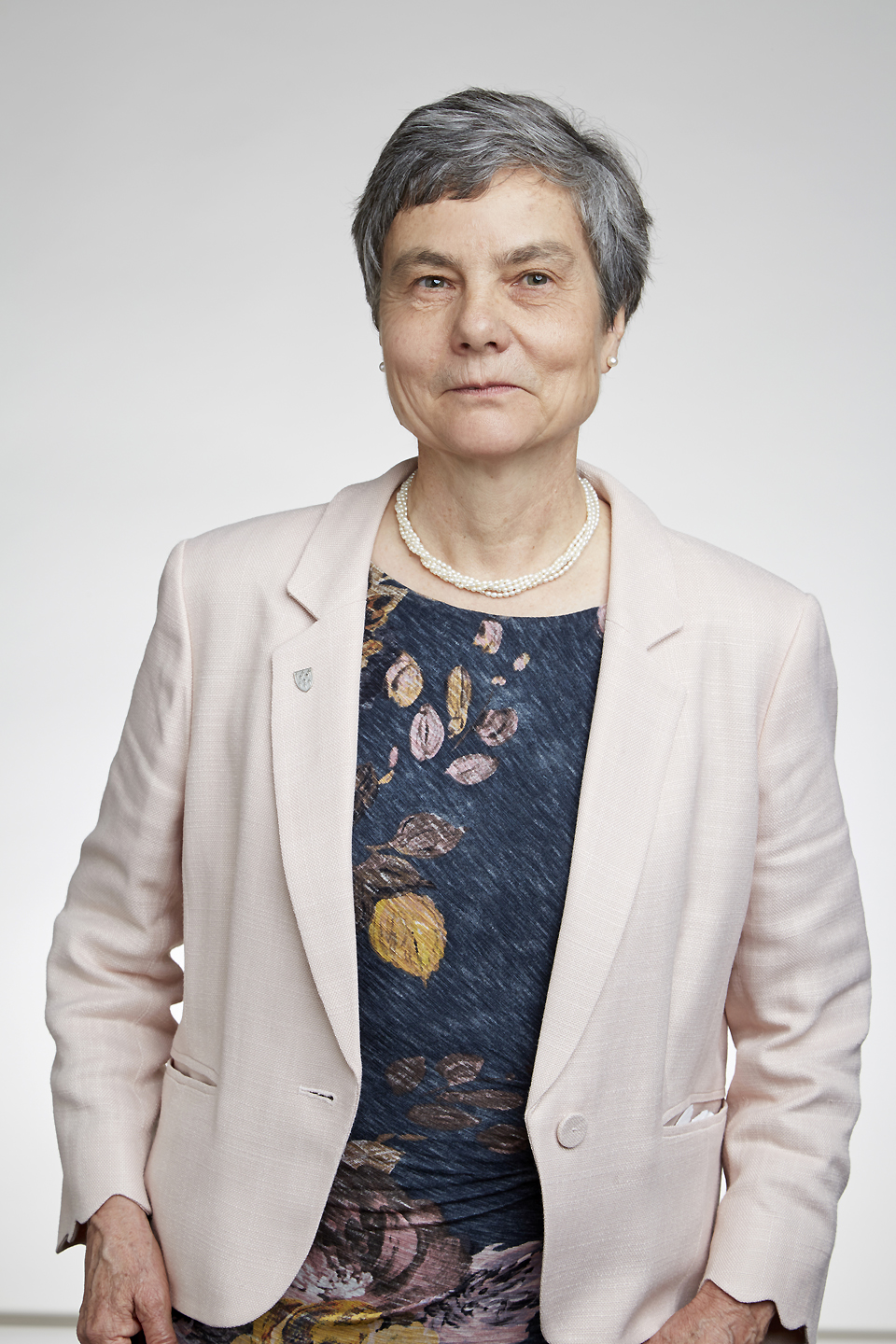
Professor Caroline Series, FRS, mathematician
