= John P. Burrows =

British geophysicst (born 1954)

John P. Burrows FRS
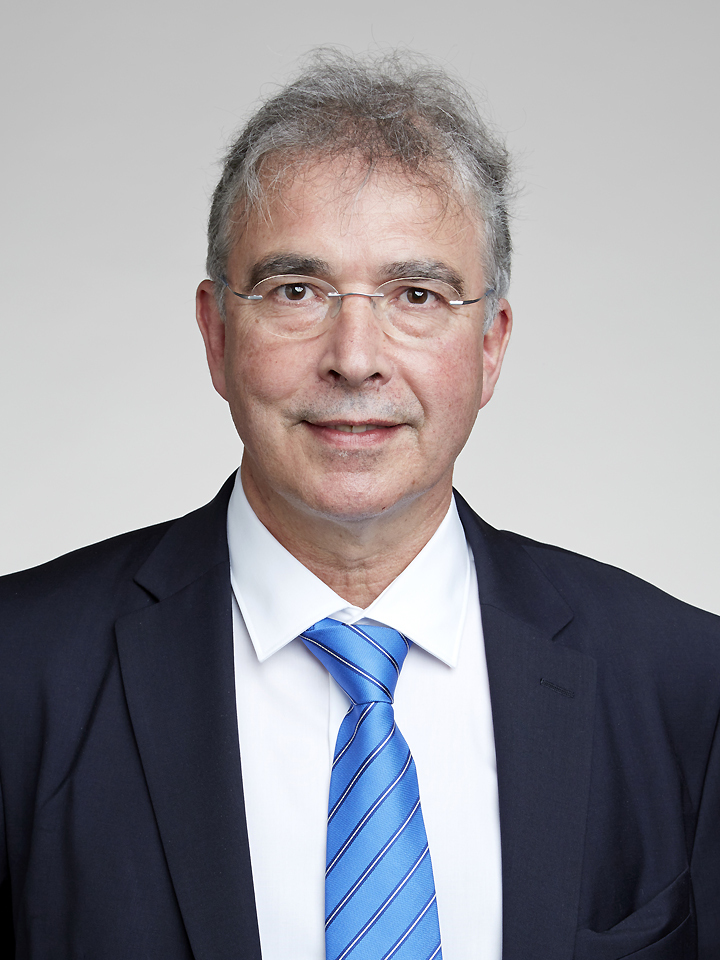
- Burrows in 2016
- Born: 16 August 1954 (age 72); Liverpool, England
- Education: University of Cambridge
- Known for: SCIAMACHY
- Scientific career
- Workplaces: University of Bremen; Atomic Energy Research Establishment; Center for Astrophysics | Harvard & Smithsonian; Max Planck Institute for Chemistry; Centre for Ecology and Hydrology
- Thesis: Study of Free Radical Reactions by Laser Magnetic Resonance (1978)
- Doctoral advisor: Brian Arthur Thrush
- Website: www.iup.uni-bremen.de/eng/about/membercvs/burrows-john-p.html

John Philip Burrows FRS (born 16 August 1954) is professor of the Physics of the Ocean and Atmosphere and Director of the Institutes of Environmental Physics and Remote Sensing at the University of Bremen. He is also a Fellow of the UK Centre for Ecology and Hydrology (CEH), part of the Natural Environment Research Council (NERC).

== Education ==
Burrows was educated at West Park Grammar School in St Helens, Merseyside. He went on to study at Trinity College, Cambridge, where he was awarded a Bachelor of Arts degree in Natural Sciences in 1975 followed by a PhD in 1978 for research investigating free radical reactions by laser magnetic resonance supervised by Brian Arthur Thrush.

== Career ==
Following his PhD, Burrows was a postdoctoral researcher at the Center for Astrophysics | Harvard & Smithsonian in Cambridge, Massachusetts. From 1979 to 1982 he worked at the Atomic Energy Research Establishment (AERE) in Harwell followed by ten years at the Max Planck Institute for Chemistry in Mainz. He was appointed a professor at the University of Bremen in 1992 where he has worked since.

== Research ==
Burrows' research has contributed to our scientific understanding of air pollution, the ozone layer, the upper atmosphere, biogeochemistry and climate change. He and his co-workers have studied the kinetics and spectroscopy of key atmospheric free radicals and gases, developed innovative in situ trace atmospheric measurement techniques, and pioneered the passive remote sensing of atmospheric constituents and surface parameters. Working closely with the German Aerospace Center (DLR), the European Space Agency (ESA) and NASA, he initiated and led scientifically the SCIAMACHY project, which resulted in the satellite based measurements of the instruments Global Ozone Monitoring Experiment (GOME) on ESA ERS-2 (1995–2011), SCIAMACHY on ESA Envisat (2002 -2012), GOME-2 on EUMETSAT Metop Series (2006–2022), and the concepts GeoSCIA/GeoTROPE, now developed as European Union Copernicus Programme Sentinel 4, and CarbonSat/CarbonSat Constellation.

== Awards and honours ==
Burrows is a fellow of the American Association for the Advancement of Science (AAAS), American Geophysical Union (AGU), the International Union of Geodesy and Geophysics (IUGG), the Centre for Ecology and Hydrology and member of IAA. His research accolades include being awarded the following: the Committee on Space Research (COSPAR) William Nordberg Medal in 2006, the NASA Group Achievement Award in 2008, the Journal of Quantitative Spectroscopy and Radiative Transfer (JQSRT) Milestone Paper Award in 2010, Haagen-Smit Prize 2012, EGU Vilhelm Bjerknes Medal 2013, IUGG Silver Medal IUGG 2015, and the Alfred Wegener Medal EGU 2016. Burrows was elected a Fellow of the Royal Society (FRS) in 2016.
