= Henry Gilbert =

Henry Gilbert may refer to:

- Henry Gilbert (author) (1868–1937), children's author
- Henry F. Gilbert (1868–1928), American composer
- Henry Gilbert (actor) (1913–1973), English-born Australian actor

== See also ==
- Harry Gilbert (disambiguation)
