= Anne Glover (biologist) =

Scottish biologist (born 1956)

Dame Anne Glover DBE FRS FRSE FRSGS FASM
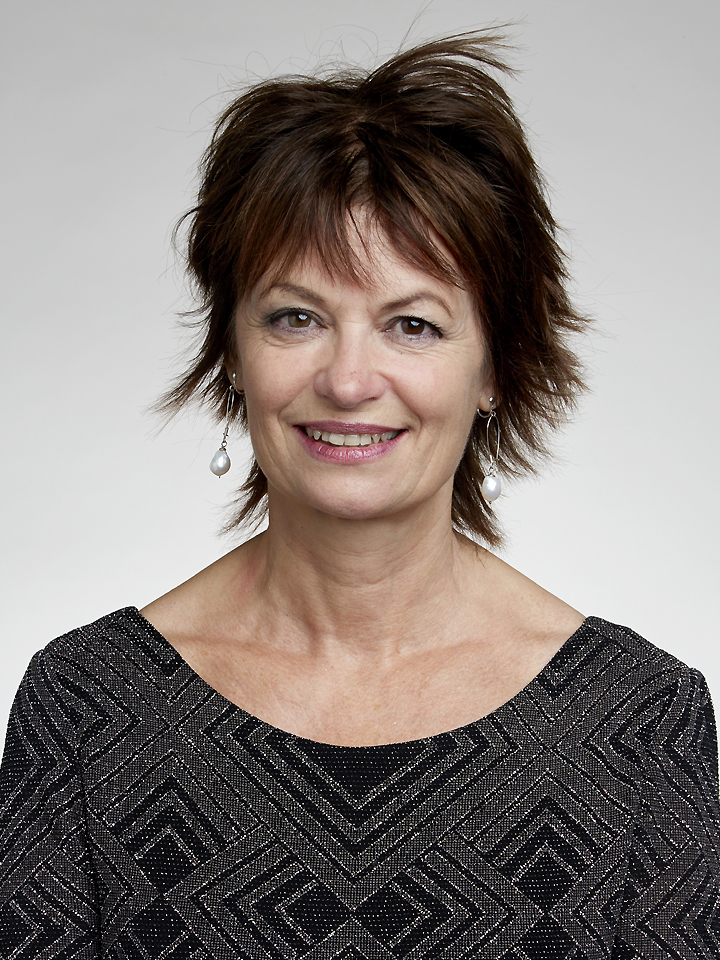
- Glover in 2016
- Born: 19 April 1956 (age 70)
- Spouse: Ian George
- Scientific career
- Fields: Biosensors; Microbiology
- Thesis: The Biochemistry and Biosynthesis of Halobacterial Membrane Proteins (1982)

Dame Lesley Anne Glover DBE FRS FRSE FRSGS FASM (born 19 April 1956) is a Scottish biologist and academic. She was Professor of molecular biology and cell biology at the University of Aberdeen before being named Vice Principal for External Affairs and Dean for Europe. She served as Chief Scientific Adviser to the President of the European Commission from 2012 to 2014. In 2018 she joined the Principal's senior advisory team at the University of Strathclyde.

== Early life and education ==
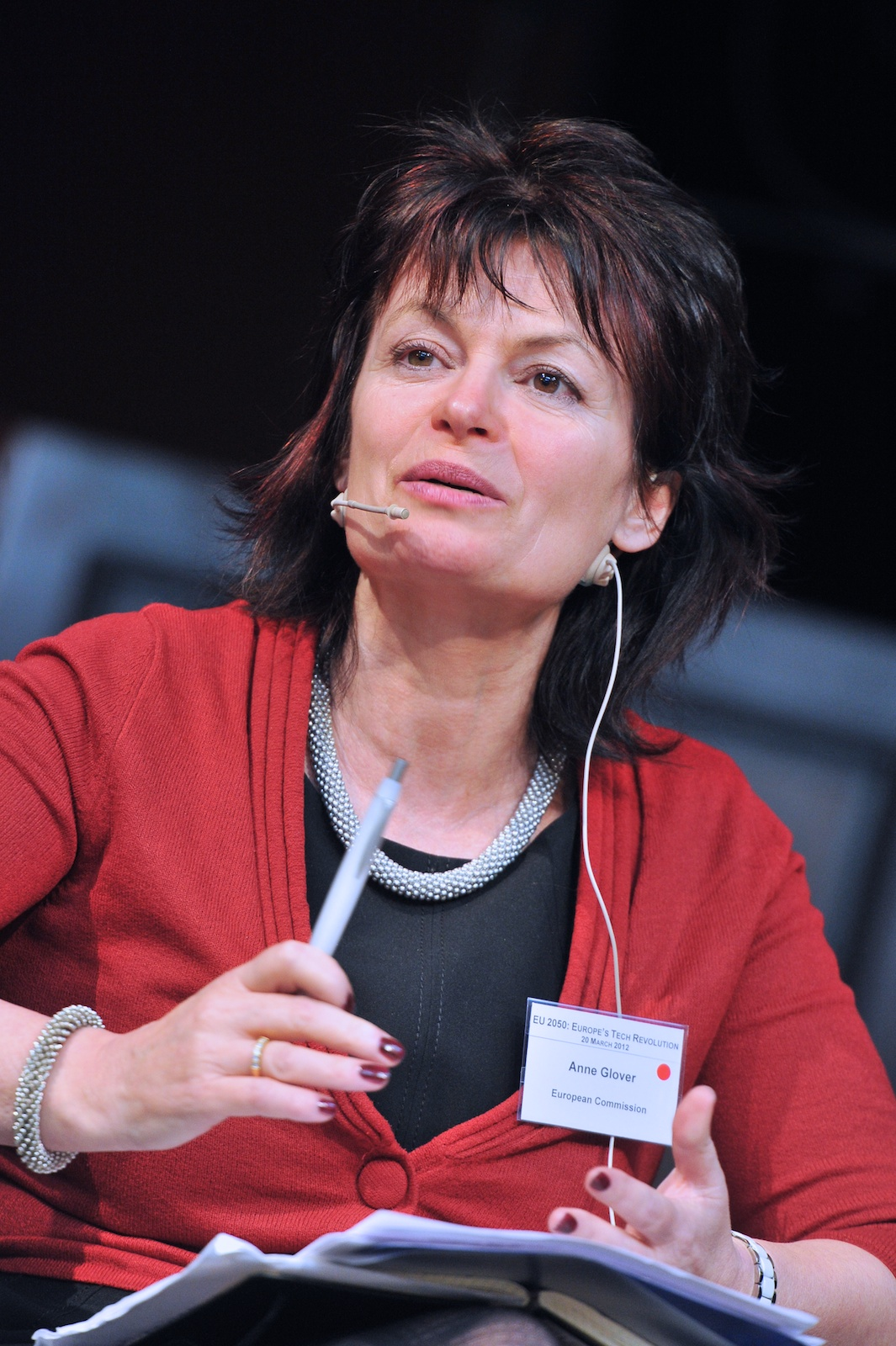
Dame Anne Glover

Glover was born on 19 April 1956 to Mary Johnstone and Wesley Glover. She was educated at the High School of Dundee and studied at the University of Edinburgh for a BSc (Hons) degree in biochemistry, passing with first class honours in 1978. She went on to study at King's College, Cambridge, where she obtained an MPhil degree in 1979 and a PhD degree in 1981 on the biosynthesis of halobacterial membrane proteins.

== Career and research ==
From August 2006 to December 2011, she was the first ever Chief Scientific Adviser for Scotland, where her role was to further enhance Scotland's reputation as a science nation. She was joint chair of the Scottish Science Advisory Committee and served on the Scottish Council of Economic Advisers until her appointment to the European Commission in 2012.

Glover holds a Personal Chair of Molecular and Cell Biology at the University of Aberdeen, along with honorary positions at the Macaulay and Rowett Institutes, and the University of New South Wales, Sydney.

=== European Commission ===
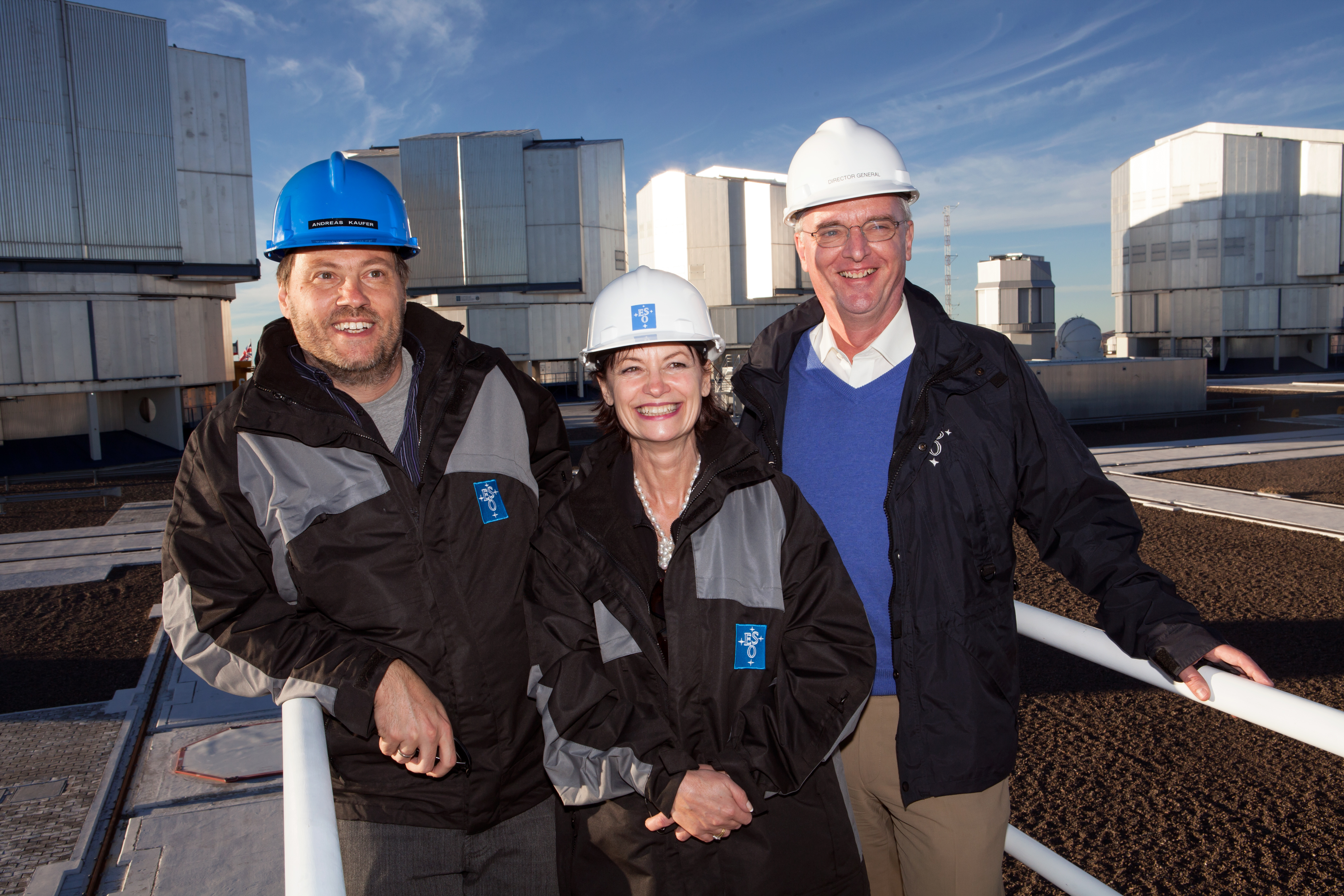
Chief Scientific Adviser to the European Commission, Anne Glover, visits ESO's Paranal Observatory.

Glover's role as Chief Scientific Adviser included provision of independent expert advice on any aspect of science, technology and innovation as requested by the President of the European Commission. She also acted as an ambassador for European science, both promoting and communicating the benefits and values of science in Europe. She presided over a substantial growth in the role of the Chief Scientific Adviser, from a position with almost no resources to an influential voice in European science policy. She consistently emphasised the need for the European Commission's science policy to be firmly based on evidence.

On 13 and 14 November 2014, it was reported by the BBC and The Times that the Chief Scientific Adviser's post would be abolished, following lobbying from nongovernmental organisations, including green groups who disagreed with Professor Glover's support for evidence based policy, including genetically modified crops, after the president of the European Commission Jean-Claude Juncker decided to close the Bureau of European Policy Advisers. An article in New Scientist earlier in the year highlighted the controversy concerning the proposals for abolition.

By 2016, the post of Chief Scientific Adviser to the European Commission had been replaced by the Scientific Advice Mechanism, which combined a group of seven Advisors with an independent evidence review process provided by European academies in the SAPEA consortium.

=== Honours and awards ===
Glover was elected Fellow of the Royal Society of Edinburgh (2005), an Honorary Fellow of the Royal Society of Biology (2009; formerly the Institute of Biology) a Fellow of the Royal Society of Arts (2009) and the American Society for Microbiology (1995). She was elected a Fellow of the Royal Society (FRS) in 2016.

She was President of the Royal Society of Edinburgh between 2018 and 2021.

She was a council member of the Natural Environment Research Council from 2001 to 2011. She was recognised in 2008 as a Woman of Outstanding Achievement by the UK Resource Centre for Women in Science, Engineering and Technology In February 2013 she was assessed as the 19th most powerful woman in the United Kingdom by Woman's Hour on BBC Radio 4. She was interviewed by Jim Al-Khalili for The Life Scientific, broadcast in March 2014.

In the 2009 New Year Honours, Glover was appointed a Commander of the Order of the British Empire (CBE) in recognition of her service as Chief Scientific Adviser for Scotland and "for services to environmental science". In the 2015 Queen's Birthday Honours, she was promoted to Dame Commander of the Order of the British Empire (DBE) in recognition of her role as Chief Scientific Adviser to the President of the European Commission and "for services to Science".

Glover has received the following honorary doctorates and fellowships: Honorary Research Fellow, Rowett Research Institute, Aberdeen (1992); Honorary Research Fellow, James Hutton Institute, Aberdeen (2002); Honorary DSc, Edinburgh Napier University, UK (2008); Honorary Research Fellow, University of New South Wales, Sydney (2009–2012); Honorary DSc, Open University, UK (2010); Honorary DSc, University of Strathclyde, UK, Honorary Fellow, Microbiology Society, UK and Honorary Fellowship, Scottish Agricultural College, UK (2012); Honorary DSc, Heriot-Watt University, UK, Honorary DSc, Glasgow Caledonian University, UK, Honorary DSc, University of Edinburgh, UK (2013); Honorary DSc, University of Glasgow, UK (2014); Honorary DSc, University of Abertay, UK, Honorary DSc, University of Exeter, UK, Honorary DSc, Cardiff University, UK, Honorary DSc, Ben Gurion University, Israel, Honorary DSc, Waterloo University, Canada (2015), Honorary DSc, University of York, UK (2017).
