= Brian Thrush =

British physical chemist (1928–2023)

- Born: 23 July 1928; Hendon, England
- Died: 14 September 2023 (aged 95); Cambridge, England
- Education: University of Cambridge
- Awards: Tilden Prize (1965); FRS (1976); Polanyi Medal (1982)
- Scientific career
- Fields: Physical chemistry
- Workplaces: University of Cambridge
- Notable students: John P. Burrows

Brian Arthur Thrush FRS (23 July 1928 – 14 September 2023) was a British physical chemist. He was an Emeritus Professor of Physical Chemistry at the University of Cambridge and a Life Fellow of Emmanuel College.

== Research ==
Thrush studied the atom and free radical reactions in the gas phase of spectroscopic methods. He made the first comprehensive examination of the absorption spectra of free radicals in homogeneous explosions using flash photolysis. He discovered the absorption spectra of several free radicals (for example, the azide, cyclopentadienyl and tropyl radicals), and he determined the ionisation potential of the tropyl radical.

Thrush developed a new method of studying hydrogen atom reactions, and determined the rate constants of a series of nitrogen, hydrogen and oxygen atom reactions important in combustion and in the upper atmosphere. He was interested in chemiluminescence and produced a series of papers on the formation of electronically excited molecules in transfer or recombination reactions.

Thrush also developed a photochemical method for studying unimolecular reactions of molecules with known energies. He also studied the rotational spectra of free radicals (NH_{2}, PH_{2}, PH) using the Zeeman effect to bring them into resonance with a far infrared laser.

== Death ==
Brian Thrush died in Cambridge on 14 September 2023, at the age of 95.

== Awards and honours ==
Thrush won the Tilden Prize of the Royal Society of Chemistry in 1965. He was elected a Fellow of the Royal Society (FRS) in 1976.

== Extra reading ==
- Thrush, Brian (Autumn 2010). "Physical chemistry: the early days" (PDF). chem@cam (39): 13.
- "Professor Brian Thrush celebrates his 90th | Alumni". www.ch.cam.ac.uk.
