= James I. Prosser =

British microbiologist (born 1951)

James Prosser OBE FRS FRSE
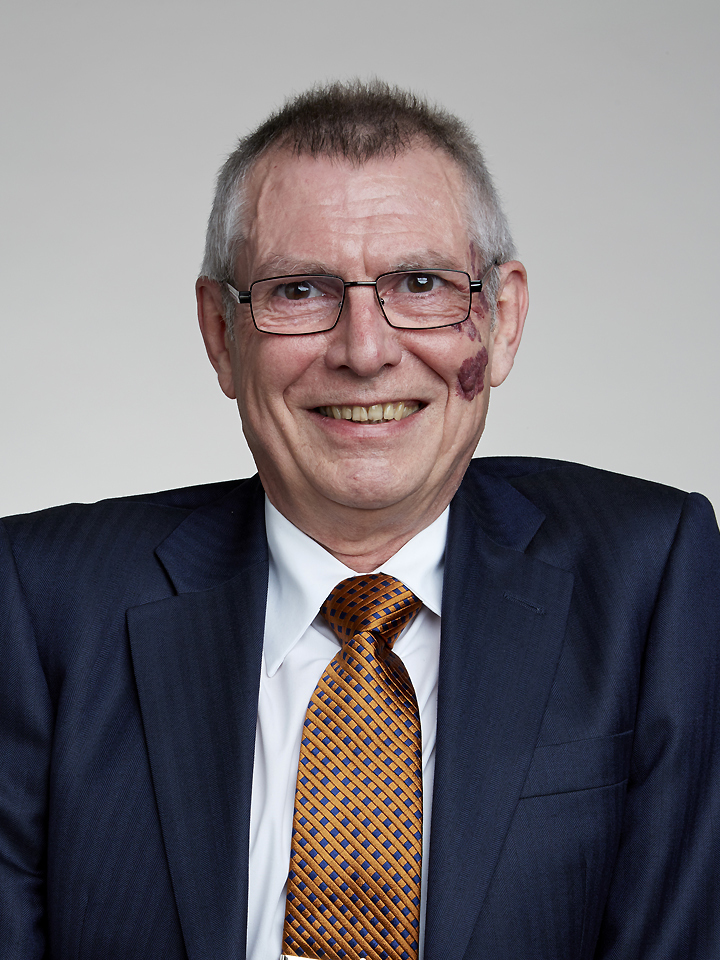
- Prosser in 2016
- Born: July 1951 (age 75)
- Website: abdn.ac.uk/sbs/people/profiles/j.prosser

James Ivor Prosser (born July 1951) is a British microbiologist who is a Professor in Environmental Microbiology in the Institute of Biological and Environmental Sciences at the University of Aberdeen.

== Education ==
Prosser studied Microbiology at Queen Elizabeth College in London and was awarded a PhD from the University of Liverpool for research supervised by Tim Gray.

== Research ==
Prosser is a microbial ecologist who has made significant contributions to our understanding of the diversity and ecosystem function of microorganisms in natural environments.

A major focus of his research has been the ecology of soil nitrifying bacteria and archaea, which significantly reduce the efficiency of nitrogen fertilisers and generate greenhouse gases. His research has determined links between the remarkably high diversity of soil ammonia oxidisers and their ecosystem function and he has demonstrated niche specialisation and differentiation in bacterial and archaeal ammonia oxidisers.

Prosser's research exploits laboratory experimental systems to test ecological concepts and he has developed molecular biology techniques for characterisation of the diversity and activities of complex communities of microorganisms, most of which cannot be cultivated.

== Awards and honours ==
Prosser was appointed Order of the British Empire (OBE) for services to environmental science in the 2013 New Year Honours. He was elected a Fellow of the Royal Society of Edinburgh, the Royal Society of Biology, the American Academy of Microbiology and a Fellow of the Royal Society (FRS) in 2016.

Prosser has served as director of the Federation of European Microbiological Societies (FEMS) and the Microbiology Society.
