= Paul Workman (pharmacologist) =

British oncologist (born 1952)

Paul Workman OBE FRS FRSC FMedSci
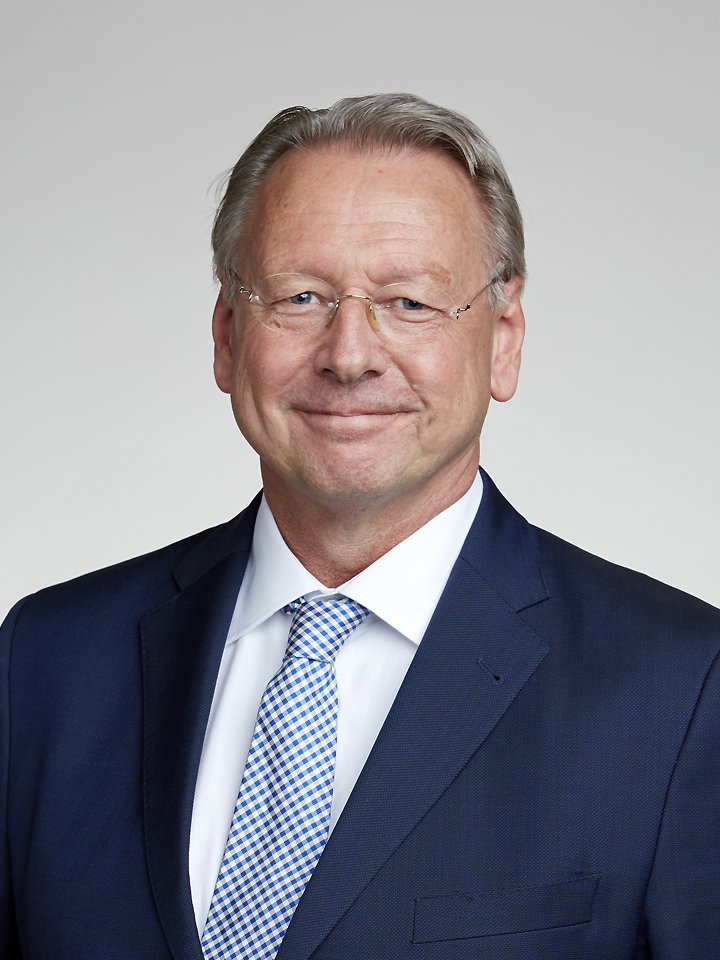
- Workman in 2016
- Born: 30 March 1952 (age 74); Workington, Cumbria, England
- Education: University of Leicester (BSc); University of Leeds (PhD)
- Known for: Cancer drugs
- Awards: FRS (2016); FRSC (2010); FMedSci (2002)
- Scientific career
- Workplaces: University of Cambridge; Institute of Cancer Research
- Thesis: Studies on some enzyme-activated anti-tumour agents (1976)
- Website: www.icr.ac.uk/our-research/researchers-and-teams/professor-paul-workman

Paul Workman OBE FRS FRSC FMedSci (born 30 March 1952) is a British scientist noted for his work on the discovery and development of pharmaceutical agents in the field of oncology. He was President and CEO of The Institute of Cancer Research in London from 2014 to 2021.

== Education and early life ==
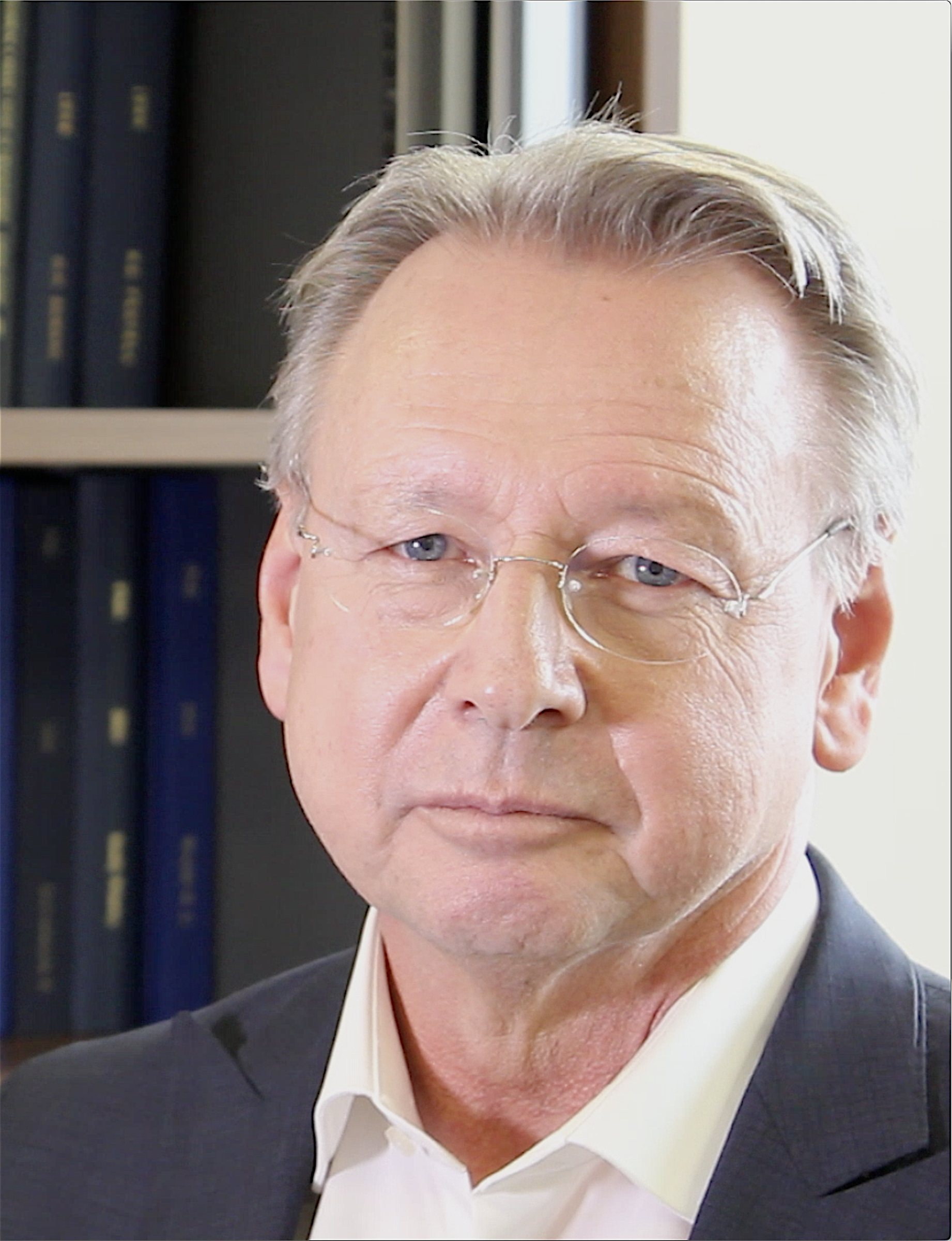
Paul Workman

Workman was born on 30 March 1952 in Workington, Cumbria, England. He was educated at Workington County Grammar School, Cumbria, and completed his BSc degree in Biochemistry at the University of Leicester and his PhD degree in Cancer Pharmacology at the University of Leeds. He later received an Honorary DSc degree from the University of Leicester in 2009.

== Career and research ==
The early part of his career (1976–90) was spent establishing and leading the Pharmacology and New Drug Development Laboratory at the Medical Research Council's Clinical Oncology Unit at the University of Cambridge, where he developed new treatments to exploit hypoxic cells in solid tumours and elucidated the enzymes involved in the activation of hypoxia-targeted drugs.

In 1990 Workman spent a sabbatical period in the Department of Therapeutic Radiology, Stanford University and SRI International, California, USA where he continued his work on tumour hypoxia funded by a Fellowship from what was then the International Union Against Cancer.

In 1991 Workman was appointed as a Cancer Research Campaign (CRC) Life Fellow, Professor of Experimental Cancer Therapy, University of Glasgow and Director of Laboratory Research in the CRC Department of Medical Oncology, CRC Beatson Laboratories, Glasgow. Here he extended his research on tumour hypoxia and molecular targeted therapies. Workman also continued his service for the European Organisation for Research and Treatment of Cancer (EORTC) as Chairman of the EORTC Pharmacology and Molecular Mechanisms Group. Member of EORTC Board and Council as Chairman of the EORTC New Drug Development Coordinating Committee.

Workman joined the ICR in 1997 to develop its Cancer Research UK Cancer Therapeutics Unit. Overall, since 2005, the Cancer Therapeutic Unit has discovered 17 drug candidates, seven of which have progressed to the patient trial stage. Workman has attributed this record to "taking early academic risks, combining academic and pharmaceutical expertise, and implementing strong leadership and project management. Other contributing factors include running multiple projects on a competitive scale, establishing long-term financial support and – most important – selecting productive and timely industrial collaborations."

Workman was appointed Deputy CEO of the ICR in March 2011. He was later elected as President and CEO in November 2014.

Workman is currently working on drugs that block molecules essential for the growth and survival of cancer cells, in particular, molecular chaperones such as Hsp90. The leading Hsp90 inhibitor was discovered by Workman's team at ICR in collaboration with Vernalis.

=== Awards and honours ===
- 2010 elected Fellow of the Royal Society of Chemistry (FRSC)
- 2010 Royal Society of Chemistry George and Christine Sosnovsky Award in Cancer Therapy
- 2014 awarded Raymond Bourgine Award for "exceptional contributions to oncology".
- 2016 elected Fellow of the Royal Society (FRS)
