= David Roderick Curtis =

Australian pharmacologist and neurobiologist (1927–2017)

David Roderick Curtis (3 June 1927 – 11 December 2017) was an Australian pharmacologist and neurobiologist.

Born in Melbourne, he was Professor of Pharmacology, Australian National University 1966-1988 and Director and Howard Florey Professor of Medical Research, John Curtin School of Medical Research from 1989 until his retirement in 1992, at which time he was appointed Emeritus Professor and University Fellow. He was elected Fellow of the Australian Academy of Science in 1965 and the Royal Society in 1968. He served as President of the Australian Academy of Science 1986–90, and was appointed a Companion of the Order of Australia in 1992.
