= Alastair Compston =

British neurologist (born 1948)

Alastair Compston CBE FRS FMedSci FRCP
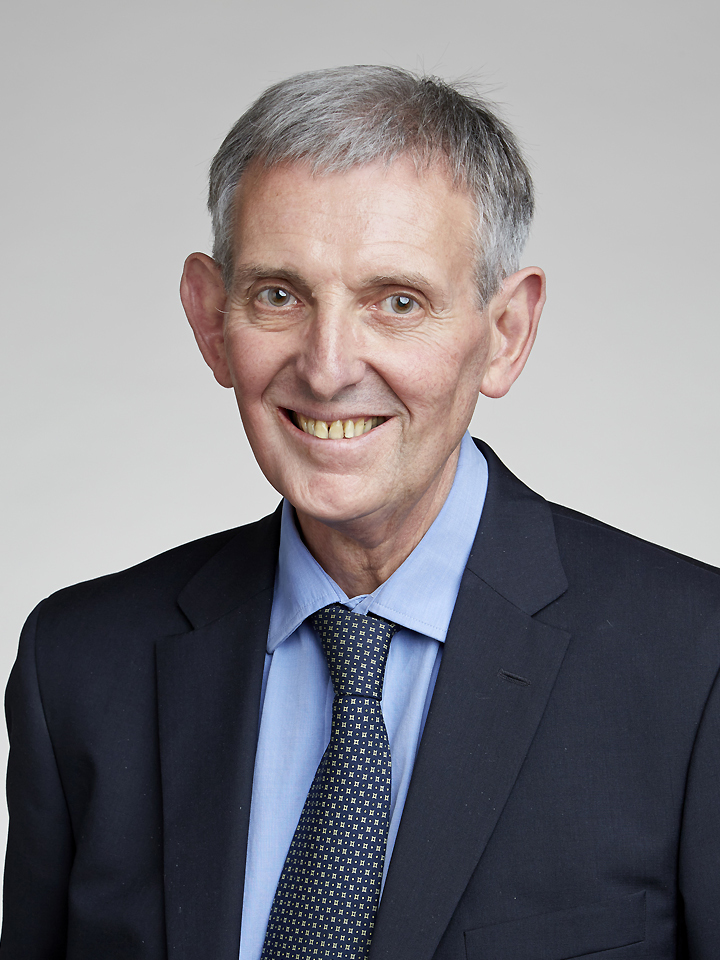
- Compston in 2016
- Born: 23 January 1948 (age 78)
- Education: Rugby School; Middlesex Hospital Medical School; University of London
- Scientific career
- Fields: Neurology
- Workplaces: University of Wales; University of Cambridge
- Thesis: Multiple Sclerosis and the HLA System (1978)
- Website: www.neuroscience.cam.ac.uk/directory/profile.php?AlastairCompston

David Alastair Standish Compston (born 23 January 1948) is a British neurologist. He is an emeritus professor of neurology in the Department of Clinical Neurosciences at the University of Cambridge and an emeritus fellow of Jesus College, Cambridge.

== Education ==
Compston was educated at Rugby School followed by the medical school of Middlesex Hospital, where he was awarded a Bachelor of Medicine, Bachelor of Surgery degree. He completed his PhD on multiple sclerosis and the Human Leukocyte Antigen (HLA) system at the University of London graduating in 1978.

== Research and career ==
Compston's research focuses on the clinical science of human demyelinating disease including the discovery of genetic risk factors for multiple sclerosis and the introduction of alemtuzumab.

Compston was formerly Professor of Neurology at the University of Wales, president of the European Neurological Society and the Association of British Neurologists, and editor of the journal Brain.. He was instrumental to the formation of Cambridge Neuroscience that started in 2007 to enhance collaboration and communication amongst neuroscientists at Cambridge university.

== Awards and honours ==
Compston's work has been recognised by prizes including the Charcot Award; the K-J Zülch Prize; the World Federation of Neurology Medal; the John Dystel Prize; the Richard and Mary Cave Award of the Multiple Sclerosis Society of Great Britain; the Hughlings Jackson Medal; the Galen Medal; and the Association of British Neurologists Medal.

Compston was elected a Fellow of the Royal Society (FRS) in 2016 and appointed Commander of the Order of the British Empire (CBE) in the 2016 New Year Honours for services to multiple-sclerosis treatment. He was elected a fellow of the Academy of Medical Sciences, and a foreign member of the National Academy of Sciences of Germany and the National Academy of Medicine of the United States.
