= Harry Gilbert (biochemist) =

British biochemist (1953–2025)

Harry Gilbert FRS FMedSci
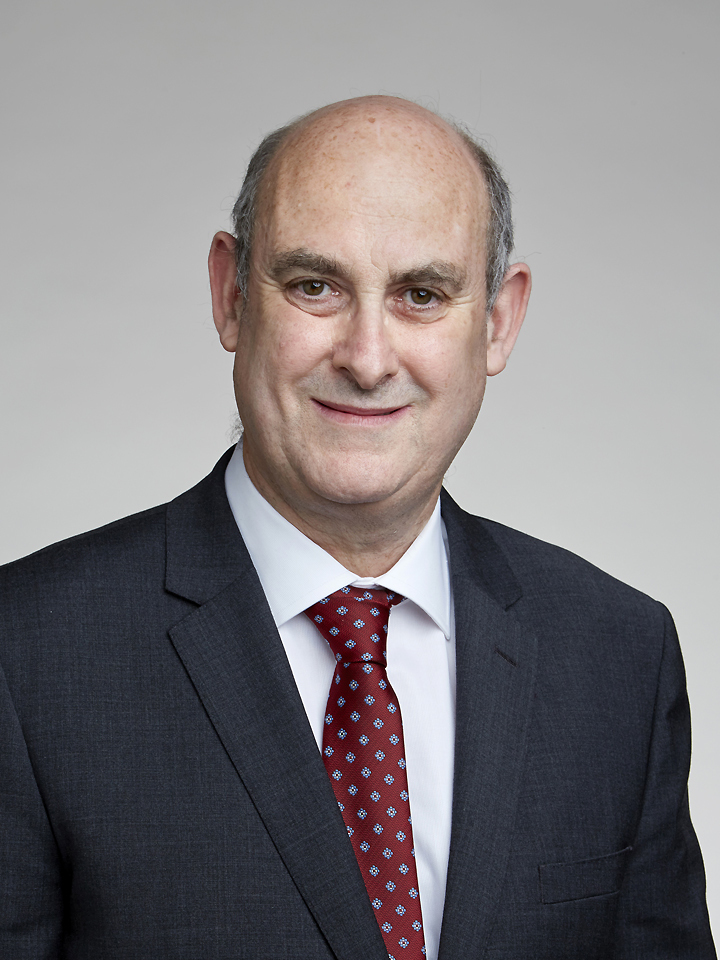
- Gilbert in 2016
- Died: 20 September 2025
- Education: University of Southampton, King Alfred School
- Employers: Newcastle University; University of Georgia
- Scientific career
- Fields: Glycobiology; Human microbiota
- Thesis: Studies on native and mutant forms of IMP dehydrogenase in Escherichia coli K12 (1979)

Harry John Gilbert (1953 – 20 September 2025) was a British biochemist, Professor of Agricultural Biochemistry and Nutrition in the Institute For Cell and Molecular Biosciences at Newcastle University.

== Education ==
Gilbert was educated at the University of Southampton graduating with a Bachelor of Science degree in 1975 followed by a PhD for research investigating mutant forms of the enzyme IMP dehydrogenase in Escherichia coli K12 in 1978.

== Research ==
Since taking up a lectureship at Newcastle University in 1985 Gilbert's research has focussed on enzymes, primarily glycoside hydrolases, which attack complex carbohydrates. These enzymes are of considerable biological and industrial importance. Gilbert has used structure-function studies to dissect the contribution of non-catalytic carbohydrate binding modules (CBMs) in targeting enzymes to complex insoluble structures exemplified by the plant cell wall, thereby overcoming the access problem.

He has extended his studies on carbohydrate binding modules to explore how glycoside hydrolases are able to select specific substrates and modes of action. Using structure-based strategies, he has exploited this fundamental understanding of enzyme specificity to engineer novel catalytic functions into these biological catalysts.

As of 2016, Gilbert has been dissecting the mechanisms of glycans utilisation by gut bacteria, in the human microbiota. His work has led to the presentation of a selfish model for the metabolism of highly complex carbohydrates by members of this ecosystem. His work has implications on resource allocation within the human microbiota, which could impact on dietary strategies that maximise the impact of this microbial ecology on health.

From 2008 to 2010 he was appointed an Eminent Scholar in Bioenergy at the University of Georgia, in the USA. Gilbert's research has been funded by the Agricultural and Food Research Council (AFRC), the Biotechnology and Biological Sciences Research Council (BBSRC), the National Science Foundation (NSF), the United States Department of Energy (DOE), the National Institutes of Health (NIH), the Wellcome Trust and the European Research Council (ERC).

== Awards and honours ==
Gilbert was elected a Fellow of the Royal Society (FRS) in 2016 and a Fellow of the Academy of Medical Sciences in the same year.

== Death ==
Gilbert died on 20 September 2025.
