= Cuthbert Leslie Cope =

- Born: 21 May 1903; City of Westminster, London
- Died: 12 March 1975 (aged 71); Yeovil, Somerset
- Occupations: Physician and endocrinologist
- Known for: Adrenal Steroids and Disease (1972); research on adrenal cortical steroid hormones

Cuthbert Leslie Cope FRCP (1903–1975) was an English physician and endocrinologist.

He graduated in 1924 BA from the University of Oxford. He studied medicine at University College Hospital Medical School. He qualified MRCS, LRCP in 1927 and MRCP in 1930. He graduated BM BCh in 1927 and DM in 1932. He held his residency appointments at University College Hospital.

He began research as a Beit Fellow in 1929 in the biochemistry department at Oxford. His first interest was renal excretion of non-threshold substances (sulphate, creatinine) and in 1931–2, at the Rockefeller Hospital, New York, with D. D. Van Slyke, he further analysed renal function tests.

On his return to the UK he held appointments successively at St Thomas' Hospital, University College Hospital, and the Radcliffe Infirmary.

... in the 1930s he contributed important studies on the anterior pituitary lobe in Graves' disease and myxoedema, on thyrotrophin assay, on the use of antithyrotrophic serum, and on pregnanediol measurements in pregnancy and in toxaemia.

Cope was elected FRCP in 1939. In 1940 he published his paper The Diagnostic Value of Pregnandiol Excretion in Pregnancy Disorders. He became in 1942 a lieutenant-colonel in the RAMC; he served from 1944 to 1945 in France and Holland and then in the postwar-era in Norway. He was director of human problems research for the UK's National Coal Board from 1947 to 1949. He was then appointed to the Royal Postgraduate Medical School. By applying chromatography and isotopes he developed methods for measuring urine levels, blood levels, and production rates for cortisol and aldosterone.

In 1954 Cope and J. García-Llauradó published evidence of excess secretion of aldosterone in a case of potassium-losing nephropathy, occurring in a 41-year-old patient with a renal tube anomaly associated with a chronic pyelonephritis. Cope, García-Llauradó, and M. D. Milne were among the first researchers to identify primary aldosteronism, also known as Conn's syndrome.

In 1958 Cope and E. Black introduced a new method for measuring the production rate of cortisol. In their method, the patient first empties the bladder and drinks a small test dose of ^{14}C-labelled cortisol. The patient's urine is then collected over the next 24 hours. From the urine sample, a measurement is made of the sample's total ^{14}C content, and a measurement is also made of the specific activity of the sample's tetrahydrocortisol, a metabolite of cortisol.

His isotope-labelled dilution technique put the reliability of estimation of cortisol activity on a new level of accuracy.

In 1959 Cope and Black published their paper The Reliability of Some Adrenal Function Tests. In 1964 Cope was the President of the Section of Endocrinology at the annual meeting of the Royal Society of Medicine. In 1966 he gave the Lumleian Lectures on The Adrenal Cortex in Internal Medicine. He retired at age 65 but continued his laboratory work. In 1972 he was awarded the Royal College of Physicians' Moxon Medal.

== Family ==
Zachary Cope was his uncle. On 9 August 1937 in Totnes, Devon, Cuthbert Leslie Cope married Eileen Gertrude Putt. They had two sons, Jonathan Leslie (b. 1940) and David Robert (b. 1944). The older son became a member of the medical profession, and the younger son became an outstanding headmaster.
