= Sidney Martin (physician) =

British physiological chemist and physician

- Born: Sidney Harris Cox Martin; 8 April 1860; Kingston, Jamaica
- Died: 22 September 1924 (aged 64)
- Education: University College London (BS, MBBS, MD)
- Children: 1

Sidney Harris Cox Martin (8 April 1860 – 22 September 1924) was a British physiological chemist, physician, and medical school professor.

== Early life ==
Sidney Martin was the second son of John Ewers Martin (1826–1893), who married Matilda Elizabeth Slayter (b. 1833) in August 1857 in Kingston, Jamaica. Sidney Martin graduated in 1878 with a B.Sc. from University College London, where he was influenced by Ray Lankester. Sidney Martin studied medicine at the University College London, where he learned physiology and experimental pathology from Sanderson, and qualified M.R.C.S. in 1882. Martin then visited Vienna to study medicine and returned to England to take junior appointments at Middlesex Hospital and at the City of London Hospital for Diseases of the Chest (renamed in 1937 the London Chest Hospital and closed in 2015). He graduated in 1883 M.B., B.S. Lond. and received in 1884 his M.D. (higher medical doctorate).

== Career ==
From 1883 onward he worked in physiology at the laboratory of Schafer at University College London. At the City of London Hospital for Diseases of the Chest he was an assistant physician from 1888 to 1890. At University College Hospital, he was an assistant physician from 1890 to 1898 and a full physician from 1898 until he died in 1924. From 1892 to 1900 he also held an appointment as assistant physician at Brompton Hospital. From 1895 to 1907, he was a professor of pathology at University College London and, simultaneously, from 1902 to 1907 professor of clinical medicine; after the reorganisation of University College Hospital he held the same positions there. During WW I he worked in the 3rd London General Hospital. From the summer of 1923 until his sudden death in 1924, he chaired the executive committee of the Imperial Cancer Research Fund.

Martin wrote a textbook on diseases of the stomach and a manual of pathology for students. In 1895 he contributed a 96-page appendix to a report by the First Royal Commission on Tuberculosis. He contributed articles on tuberculosis and (the now discredited concept of) ptomaine poisoning to Clifford Allbutt's A System of Medicine. Martin also contributed to the 3rd edition of Quain's Dictionary of Medicine and to Gibson's Textbook of Medicine.

He gave the Goulstonian Lectures in 1892, the Croonian Lectures in 1898, and the Lumleian Lectures in 1915. On 1 March 1909, he delivered the third of the Lettsomian Lectures to the Medical Society of London.

Martin was elected in 1891 a Fellow of the Royal College of Physicians and in 1895 a Fellow of the Royal Society.

== Personal life ==
Martin was married and had a daughter. He was a member of the Savile Club. He died on 22 September 1924.

== Select publications ==
=== Articles ===
- Martin, Sidney H. C. (1885). "The nature of Papaïn and its Action on Vegetable Proteids1". The Journal of Physiology. 6 (6): 336–360. doi:10.1113/jphysiol.1885.sp000202. PMC 1485029. PMID 16991399.
- Martin, S. (1886). "Papain and Dyspepsia". British Medical Journal. 1 (1319): 716. doi:10.1136/bmj.1.1319.716. PMC 2256824.
- Martin, S. (1888). "The Detection of Proteid Bodies in Urine". BMJ. 1 (1425): 842–844. doi:10.1136/bmj.1.1425.842. PMC 2197896. PMID 20752268.
- Martin, S. (1891). "Notes on "Healed" or Retrograde Tubercle". BMJ. 2 (1609): 943–945. doi:10.1136/bmj.2.1609.943. PMC 2273843. PMID 20753430.
- Martin, S. (1898). "A Clinical Lecture on Asthma and its Treatment: Delivered at the Hospital for Consumption, Brompton". BMJ. 2 (1982): 1861–1863. doi:10.1136/bmj.2.1982.1861. PMC 2434923. PMID 20758213.
- Martin, S. (1906). "The Diagnosis and Treatment of Tuberculous Pleurisy" (PDF). The Lancet. 167 (4305): 586–587. doi:10.1016/S0140-6736(01)80190-2. PMC 5194723. PMID 29812549.

=== Books ===
- Martin, Sidney (1895). Functional & Organic Diseases of the Stomach.
- Martin, Sidney (1903). A Manual of General Pathology for Students.
