= David Kerr (nephrologist) =

British nephrologist

Professor David Kerr CBE, FRCP, FRCPE
- Born: 27 December 1927; Hackney, London, England
- Died: 20 April 2014 (aged 86)
- Occupation: Nephrologist

Professor David Nichol Sharp Kerr CBE, FRCP, FRCPE (1927–2014) was a British nephrologist.

Kerr was born on 27 December 1927 in Hackney, London, England.

He attended George Watson's Boys School, Edinburgh, and then the University of Edinburgh, where he obtained his MB ChB with Honours in 1951. He subsequently undertook an MSc in Anatomy at the University of Wisconsin.

He undertook National Service as a surgeon-lieutenant with the Royal Naval Volunteer Reserve from 1953 to 1955.

He worked at University of Newcastle upon Tyne Medical School, where he rose to the position of professor of renal medicine, from 1968 to 1983, and Hammersmith Hospital, where he was both professor of renal medicine and dean from 1984 to 1992.

He served as editor of the Journal of the Royal College of Physicians of London from 1994 to 1998.

He was made a Commander of the Order of the British Empire (CBE) in 1991, and delivered the 1968 Goulstonian lecture and the 1983 Lumleian lecture.

He died on 20 April 2014.
