= Teddington Cemetery =

Cemetery in Teddington, London, England

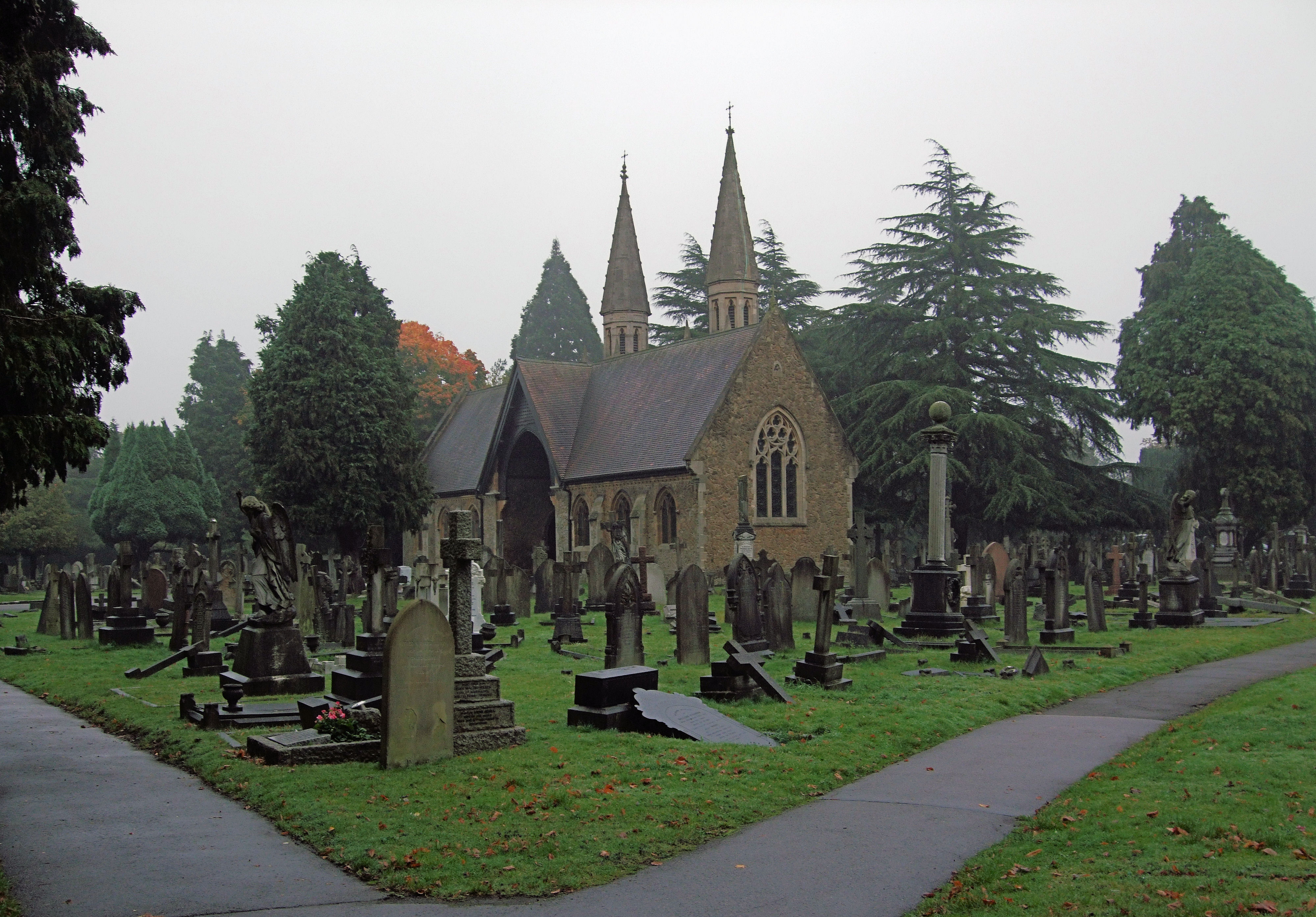
- The chapel, Teddington Cemetery
- Interactive map of Teddington Cemetery

Details
- Established: 1879; 147 years ago
- Location: Teddington, (Greater London), TW11 8SF
- Country: England
- Coordinates: 51.4334°N 0.3418°W
- Type: Active
- Style: Wooded, tree-lined
- Owned by: Richmond upon Thames Council
- Size: 5.7 hectares (14 acres)
- Website: Official website: Teddington Cemetery
- Find a Grave: Teddington Cemetery

National Register of Historic Parks and Gardens
- Official name: Teddington Cemetery
- Type: Grade II
- Designated: 3 August 2001; 25 years ago
- Reference no.: 1001547

Teddington Cemetery is a Grade II listed municipal cemetery in the north of Teddington in the London Borough of Richmond upon Thames. Opened in 1879 it has many tall, eclectic trees and its nucleus was the outcome of a competition for designs by Richmond Burial Board.

It includes the war graves of 70 Commonwealth service personnel, 42 from World War I and 28 from World War II.

== Above ground ==
=== Richmond Burial Board origins ===
Using the 1852 Burial Act, Richmond was enabled to form a burial board, and to buy and let out new burial grounds. In 1877 it bought the first parcel of land, a former orchard, of c. 1.6 hectares (4.0 acres) in the south-west from Mr Travers Smith. A competition was announced to design the layout of the burial ground, with a first prize of 15 guineas (equivalent to £2,000 in 2025) and a second prize of 5 guineas

=== Landscaping and plants ===
The cemetery has many mature trees, some of them pre-dating the creation of the cemetery, such as cedar, weeping beech, holly, yew, cypresses, giant redwood, and a fine large monkey puzzle. Several cherry trees, probably the remains of the former orchard, are scattered in the lawns of the cemetery.

Most of the small roundabouts are planted with single cypresses surrounded by heather and lawn, as is the junction of the main and central east/west axes north of the chapels. The south-west has been partially cleared. The main path gives a view north to the two chapels, planted with a semi-mature deodar cedar to each side. Among southern trees and shrubbery is the ornate medieval style (neo-Gothic) mortuary of 1879.

The former western limit remains lined by trees. The perimeter path, lined with trees, was extended westwards by two paths linking the zone to the north-west added in c. 1950.

=== Paired chapels ===
The chapels, designed by T Goodchild in the Decorated Style, have crocketed spires linked by a great entrance arch. Built in 1878, their main material is dark honey-coloured Bargate ragstone with Bathstone dressings.

== Notable burials ==
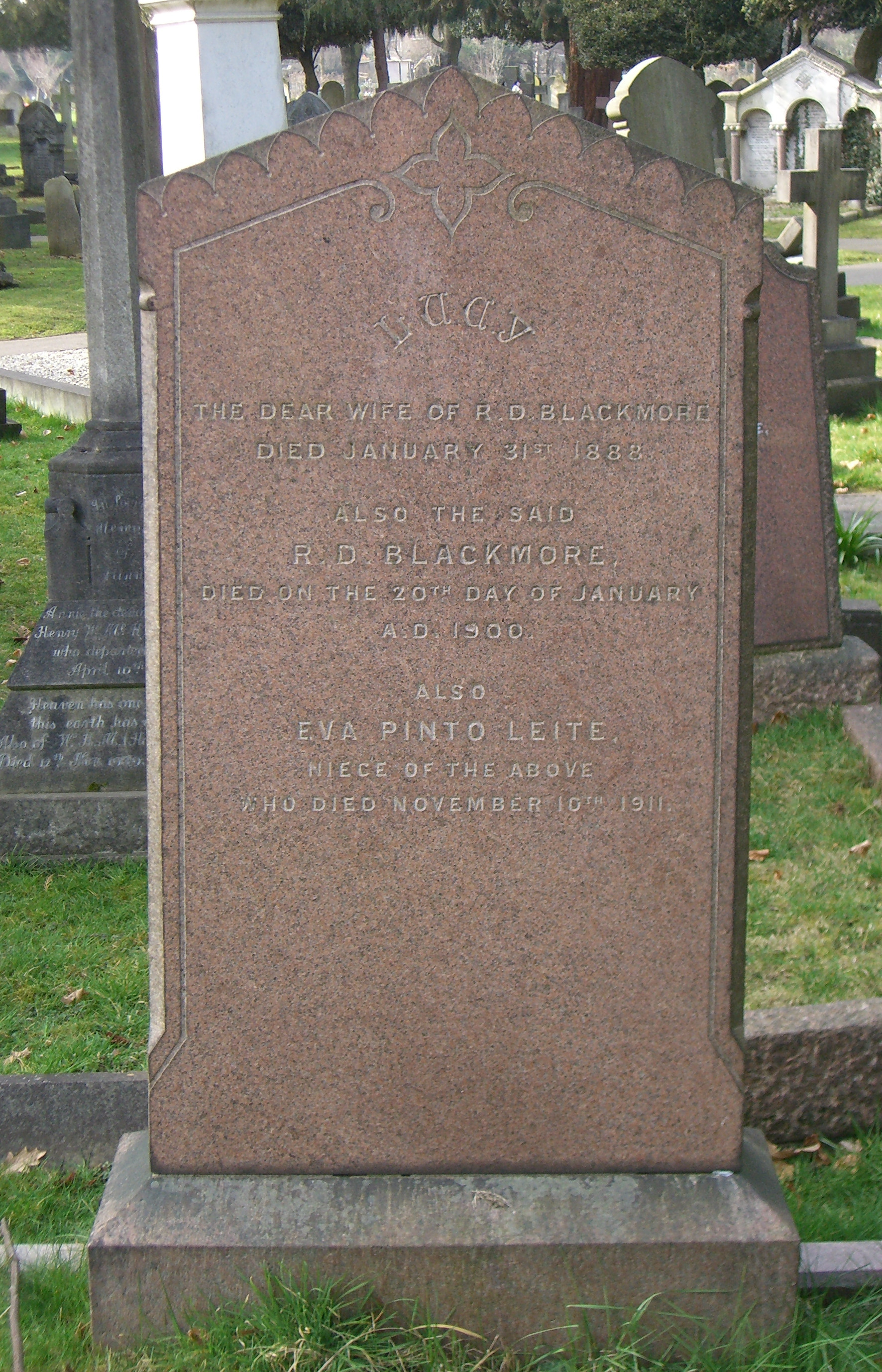
Blackmore family grave in Teddington Cemetery

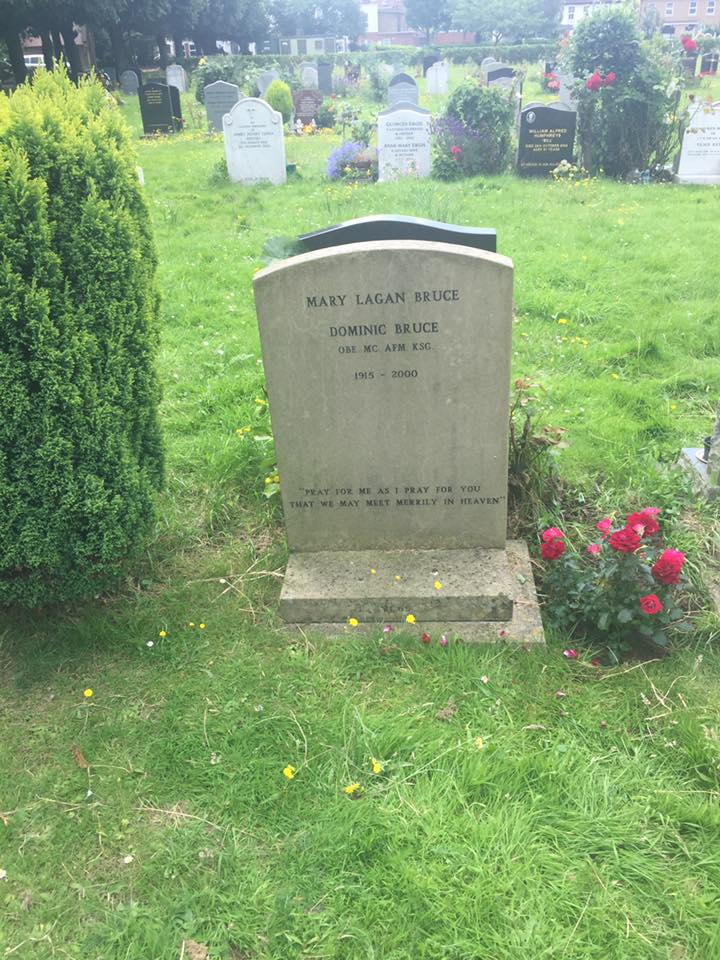
The grave of Dominic Bruce

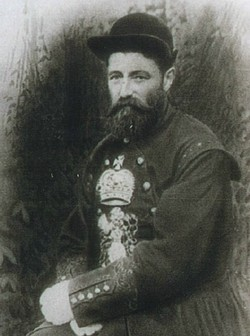
World champion sculler James Messenger, who is buried at the cemetery

- Neil Aspinall (1941–2008), former head of The Beatles' company Apple Corps
- R D Blackmore (1825–1900), author, whose novels included Lorna Doone
- Francis Leith Boyd (1853-1927), Vicar of Teddington (1884-1908)
- Flt Lt Dominic Bruce, the 'Medium Sized Man' of Colditz Castle, Section Y, Grave 69
- John Sleeper Clarke (1833–1899), American comedian and actor, who lived in London from 1867
- Violet Agnes Coward, nee Veitch (1863-1954), mother of Noel Pierce Coward, actor and playwright
- Russell Arthur Blackmore Coward (1891-1898), brother of Noel Coward
- Erik Vidal Coward (1906-1933), brother of Noel Coward
- Francis de Havilland Hall (1847–1929), physician, surgeon, and laryngologist
- Kenneth MacDonald (1950–2001), who played the character of Mike Fisher in the BBC television sit-com Only Fools and Horses
- James Messenger (1826–1901), who lived in Teddington and was the professional single sculls world champion from 1854 to 1857. He served as the Queen's Bargemaster from 1862 to 1901. At the time, he became the Champion of the Thames which was effectively the English Sculling Championship. After the English title gained the world status in 1876, earlier winners were retrospectively given the world champion title. In 1862 he won the famed Doggett's Coat and Badge race on The Thames.
- Robert John Tozer (1813–1892), one of the founders of Christ Church in Teddington. He laid the keystone of the chapels in Teddington Cemetery.
- Gustave Louis Maurice Strauss (c. 1807–1887), writer and journalist
- John Walter (1738–1812), founder of The Times.
