= Samuel Collins (physician, born 1618) =

English anatomist and physician (1618–1710)

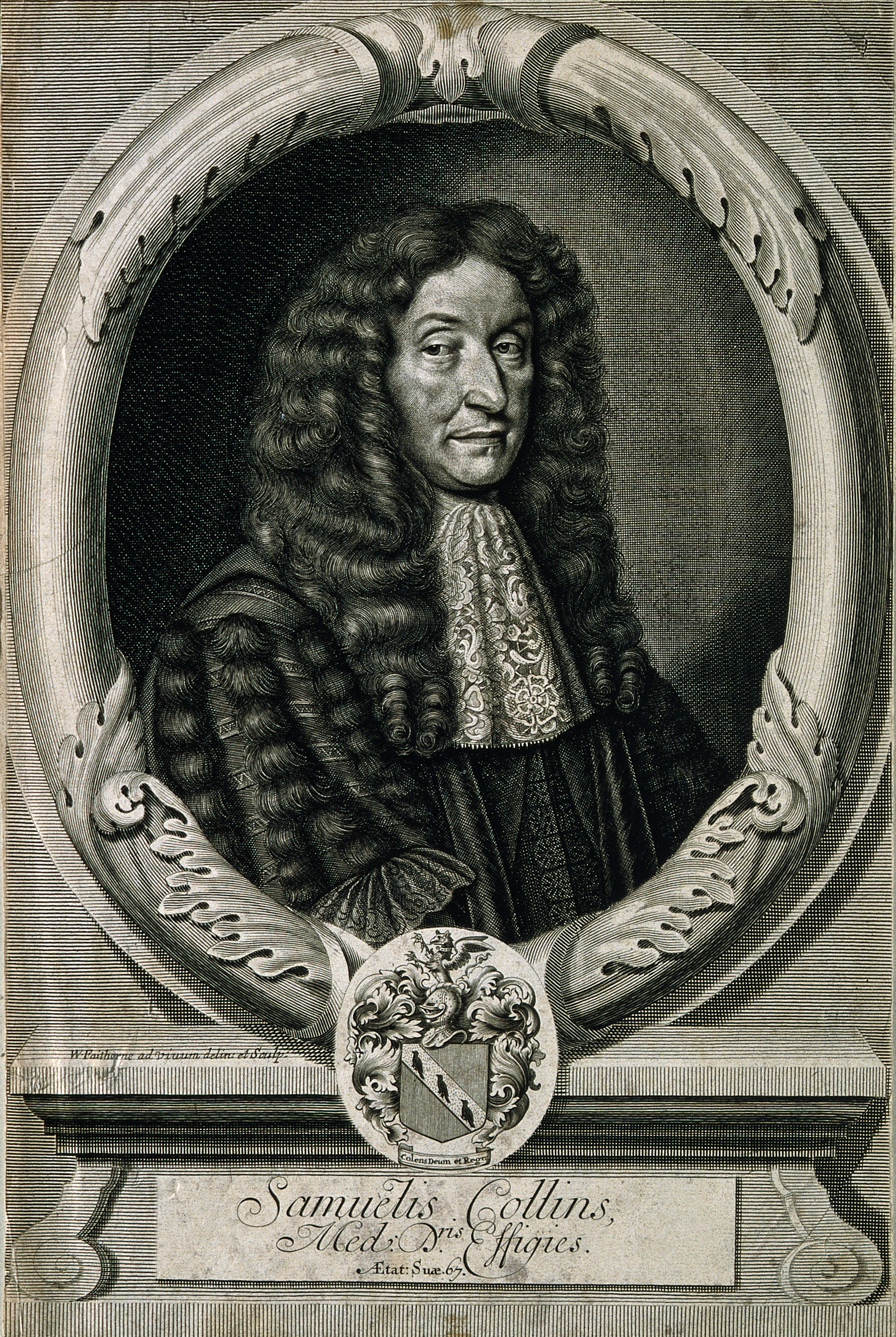
Samuelis Collins, Med: D:^{ris} Effigies. Ætat: Suæ 67.

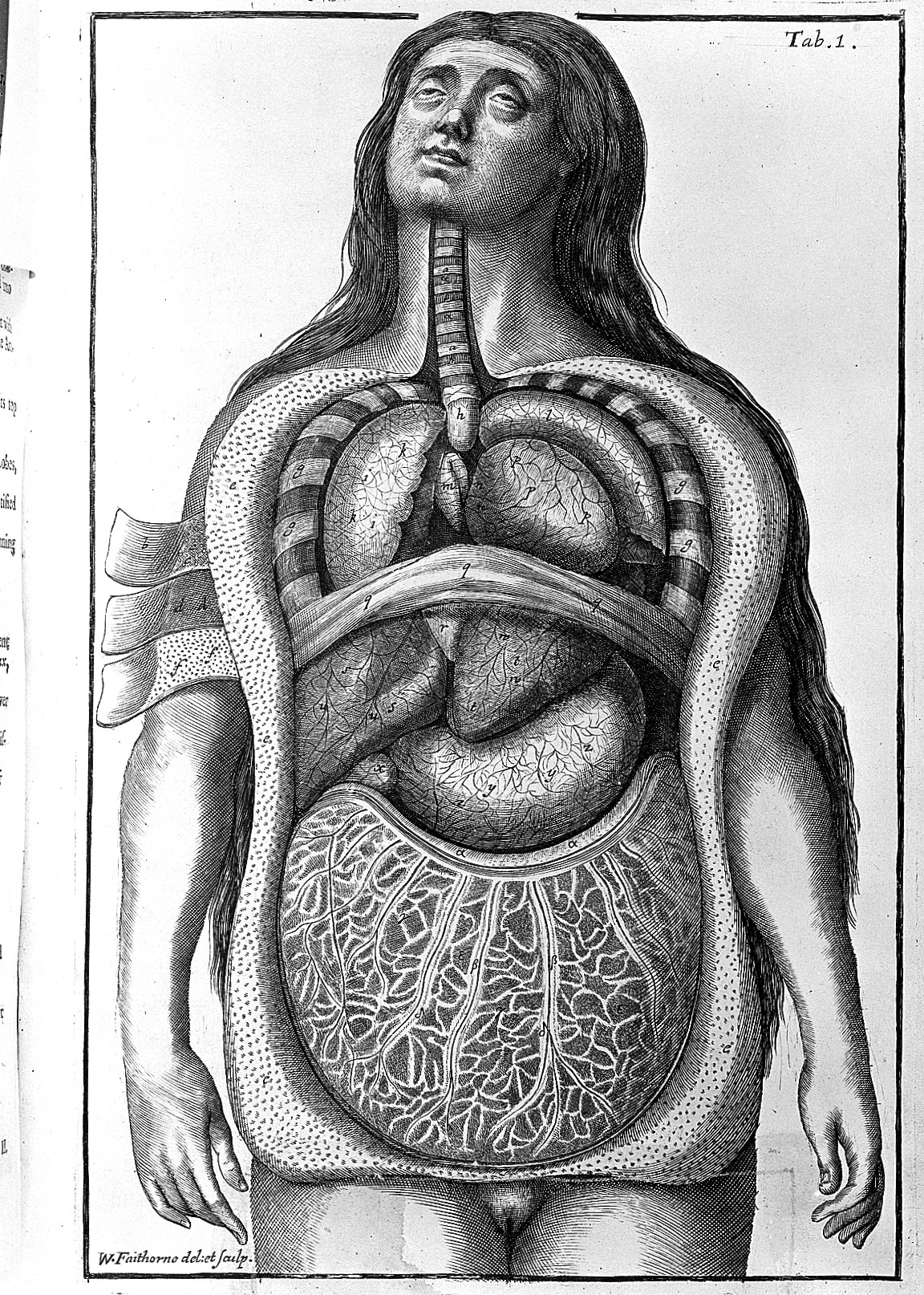
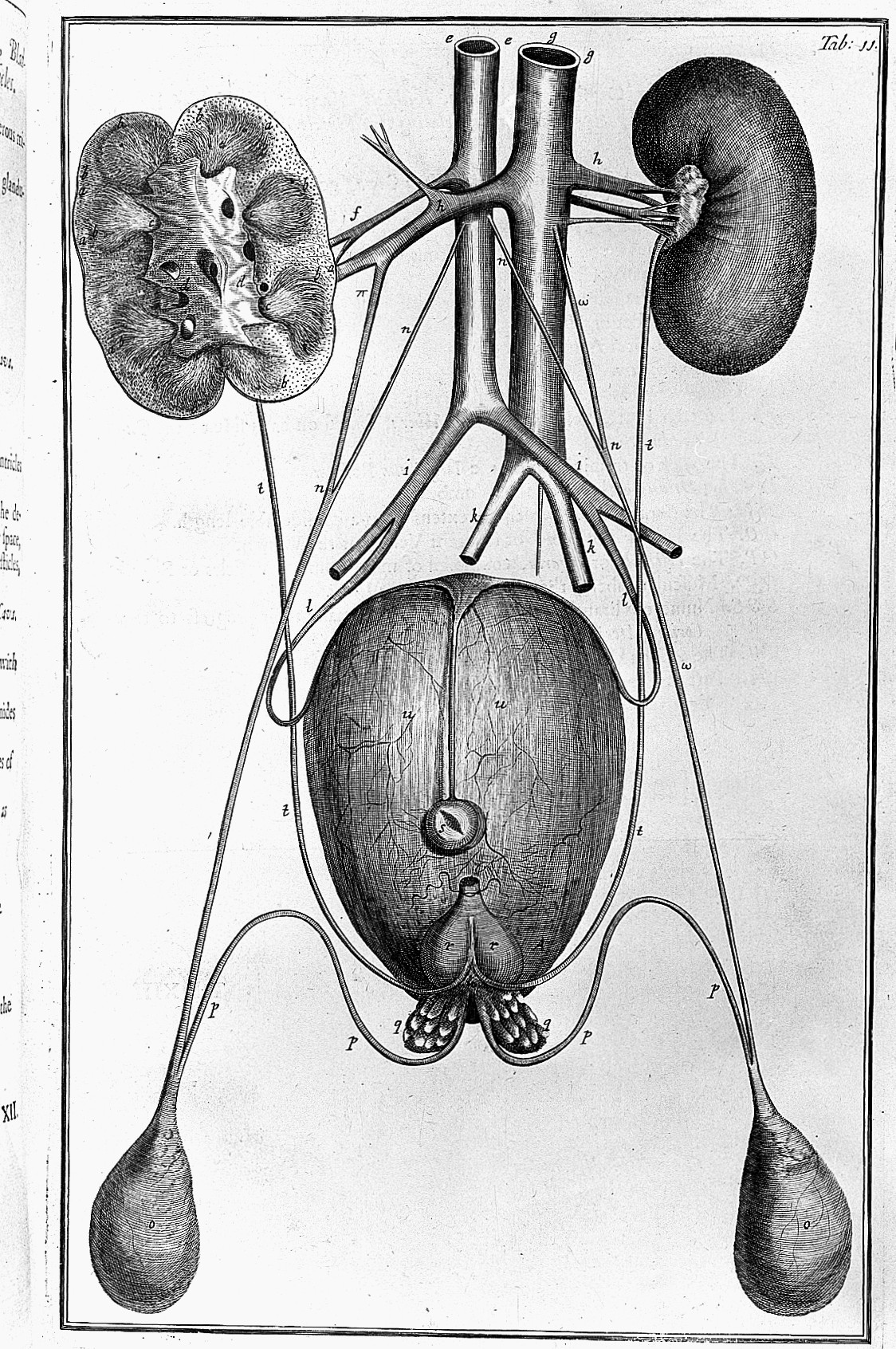
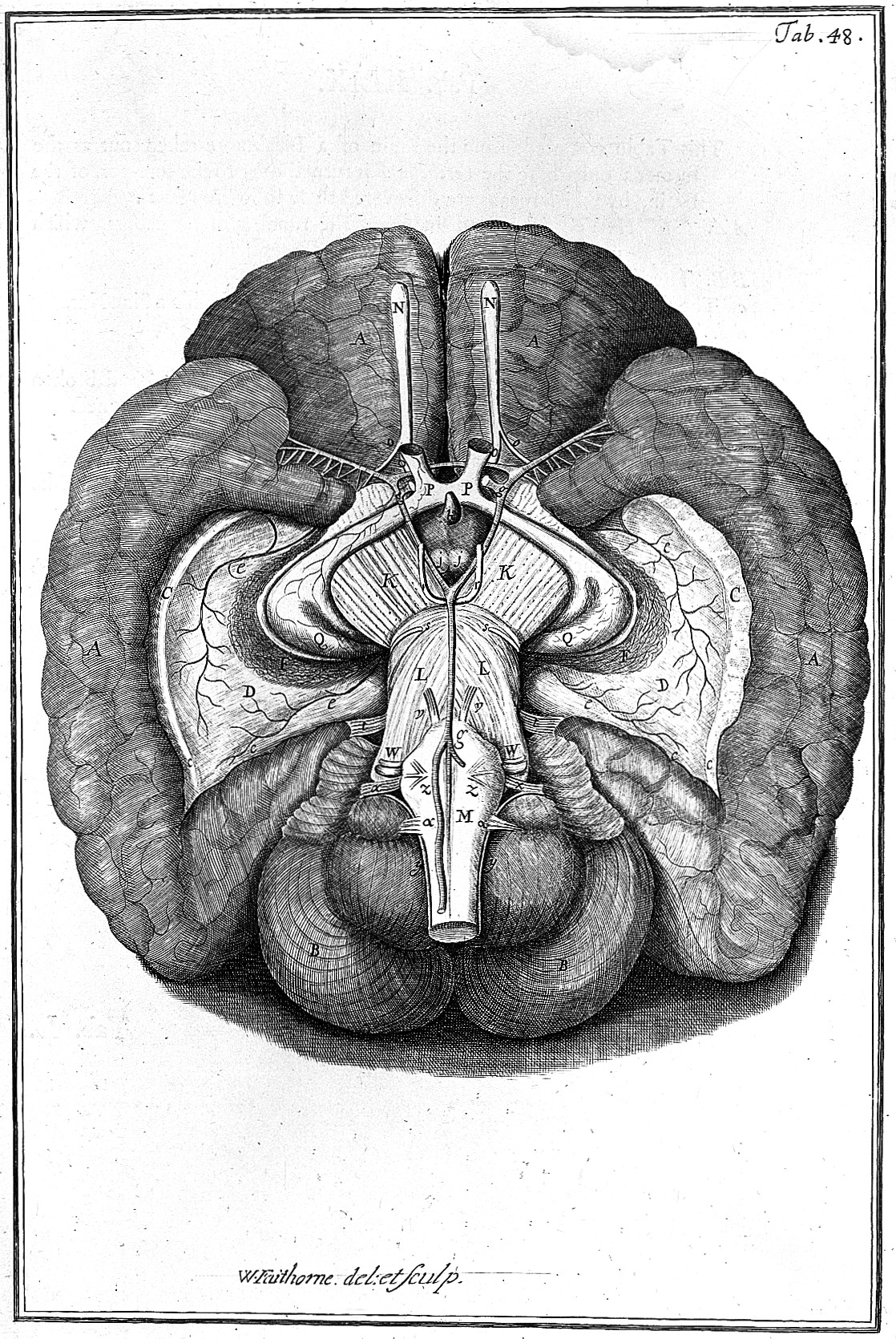

Samuel Collins, FRCP (1618–1710) was an English anatomist and physician.

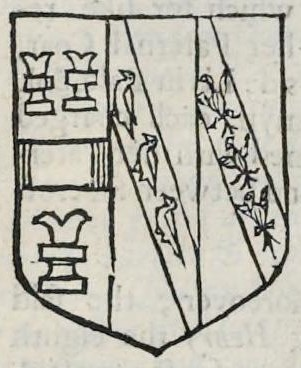
Coats of Arms (see Blazon)

== Education ==
Samuel Collins, baptised in 1618, was the only son of John Collins, rector of Rotherfield, Sussex, who was descended from an ancient family settled in the counties of Somerset and Devon. He received his education at Trinity College, Cambridge, where he was elected to a scholarship, and afterwards to a fellowship. He graduated BA in 1638–9, and MA in 1642. Then he travelled on the continent, and visited many universities in France, Italy, and the Low Countries, but found none to compare with the English. He was created MD at Padua on 25 August 1654, and was incorporated in that degree at Oxford in 1652, and at Cambridge in 1673.

== Career ==
He was admitted a candidate of the College of Physicians of London in 1656, and a fellow in 1668. About the latter date he was appointed physician-in-ordinary to Charles II. Between 1671 and 1707 he was frequently elected to the office of censor in the College of Physicians; he was anatomy reader in 1684; and on 10 September 1694 was appointed Lumleian lecturer, an office which he retained to his death. He was constituted an elect in 1689; was several times appointed consiliarius; and in 1695 was elected president of the college.

== Degrees ==
- AB Cantab (1638-9)
- AM (1642)
- MD Padua (1651)
- MD Oxon (1652)
- FRCP (1668)
- MD Cantab (1673)

== Death ==
He died on 11 April 1710. To his 'memory' is inscribed the view of the interior of the nave of St. Paul's in William Dugdale's History of that church. The plate being dated 1658 is calculated to mislead as to the date of Collins's death.

== Marriages ==
- Anne, eldest daughter of John Bodenham, Esq., of Wiltshire.
- Dame Catharine, Countess-dowager of Carnwath in Scotland, daughter of John Abington, Esq., of Dowdeswell, Gloucestershire.

== Legacy ==
William Munk says that Collins, who is mentioned in Samuel Garth's Dispensary, (Note: Where would the long neglected C----s fly, If bounteous Carus should refuse to buy?) was an accomplished anatomist, and stood foremost among his contemporaries, whether at home or abroad, in his knowledge of comparative anatomy.

His great work, which embodies a full report of his original investigations, is entitled A Systeme of Anatomy, treating of the Body of Man, Beasts, Birds, Fish, Insects, and Plants. Illustrated with many schemes, 2 vols. London, 1685, fol. It is often referred to by Boerhaave and Haller, the latter of whom writes thus of the author and his work:

Anatomen comparatam amavit, ut ipse de se fatetur; hinc magna pars operis in zootome versatur, cujus praecipuus certe auctor est; et avium pisciumque imprimis copiosissimas figuras dedit, ad Peraltianum fere morem. Ex homine icones pauciores sunt. Anatomen practicam interponit, et physiologiam, anatomen, atque pathologiam conjungit.

He loved comparative anatomy, as he says of himself; from this, the greater part of the [his?] work is in the dissection of animals, of which he is certainly an outstanding writer; and in particular he produced large numbers of images of birds and fish, almost in the manner of Peralt [Claude Perrault?]. His images of humans are fewer. He interposed [introduced?] practical anatomy, and connected physiology, anatomy and pathology.

Collins's portrait, engraved by W. Faithorne, is prefixed to his Anatomy.

== Blazon ==
He beareth Baron impaled between his Wives. The first, Gules, on a Bend, Or, three Martlets, Sable, by the name of Collins. On the dexter side, Azure, a Fess, between 3 Chesrooks, Or, by the name of Bodenham. On the sinister, Argent, on a Bend, Gules, three Eaglets displayed, Or, by the name of Abington. These Coats are thus born by Samuel Collins Dr. in Physick, late Fellow of Trinity Colledge in Cambridge, only son of John Collins, late Parson of Retherfield in Sussex, descended from the ancient Family of the Collins of the Counties of Somerset and Devon. First married to Anne eldest daughter of John Bodenham Esq; descended from the ancient Family of the Bodenhams of Wiltshire and Herefordshire, by whom he hath Issue Martha, and is now married to Dame Katherine, Countess Dowager of Carnwath in Scotland, daughter of John Abington of Dowdeswell in Glocestershire Esq; descended from the ancient Family of the Abingtons of Glocestershire, by whom he hath two daughters now living, viz. Anne and Elizabeth.

== Sources ==
- Cooper, Thompson (1887). "Collins, Samuel (1618-1710)" . In Stephen, Leslie (ed.). Dictionary of National Biography. Vol. 11. London: Smith, Elder & Co. pp. 376–377.
- Cooper, Thompson; Bevan, Michael (2004). "Collins, Samuel (bap. 1618, d. 1710), anatomist and physician". Oxford Dictionary of National Biography. Oxford University Press.
- Dugdale, William (1658). The History of St. Pauls Cathedral in London. London: Tho. Warren. pp. 167, 299.
- Garth, Samuel (1699). The Dispensary: A Poem in Six Canto's. 3rd ed. London: John Nutt. Canto IV. p. 51.
- Guillim, John (1724). A Display of Heraldry. 6th ed. London: Printed by T. W. p. 431.
- Hutchinson, Benjamin (1799). Biographia Medica. Vol. 1. London: Printed for J. Johnson. pp. 213–214.
- Munk, William (1878). The Roll of the Royal College of Physicians of London. 2nd ed. Vol. 1: 1518 to 1700. London: Harrison and Sons. pp. 355–357.
- "Samuel Collins (b.1617 d.11 April 1710)". Inspiring Physicians. Royal College of Physicians. 2019. Retrieved 30 May 2022.
