= Eric Frank Scowen =

Sir Eric Scowen
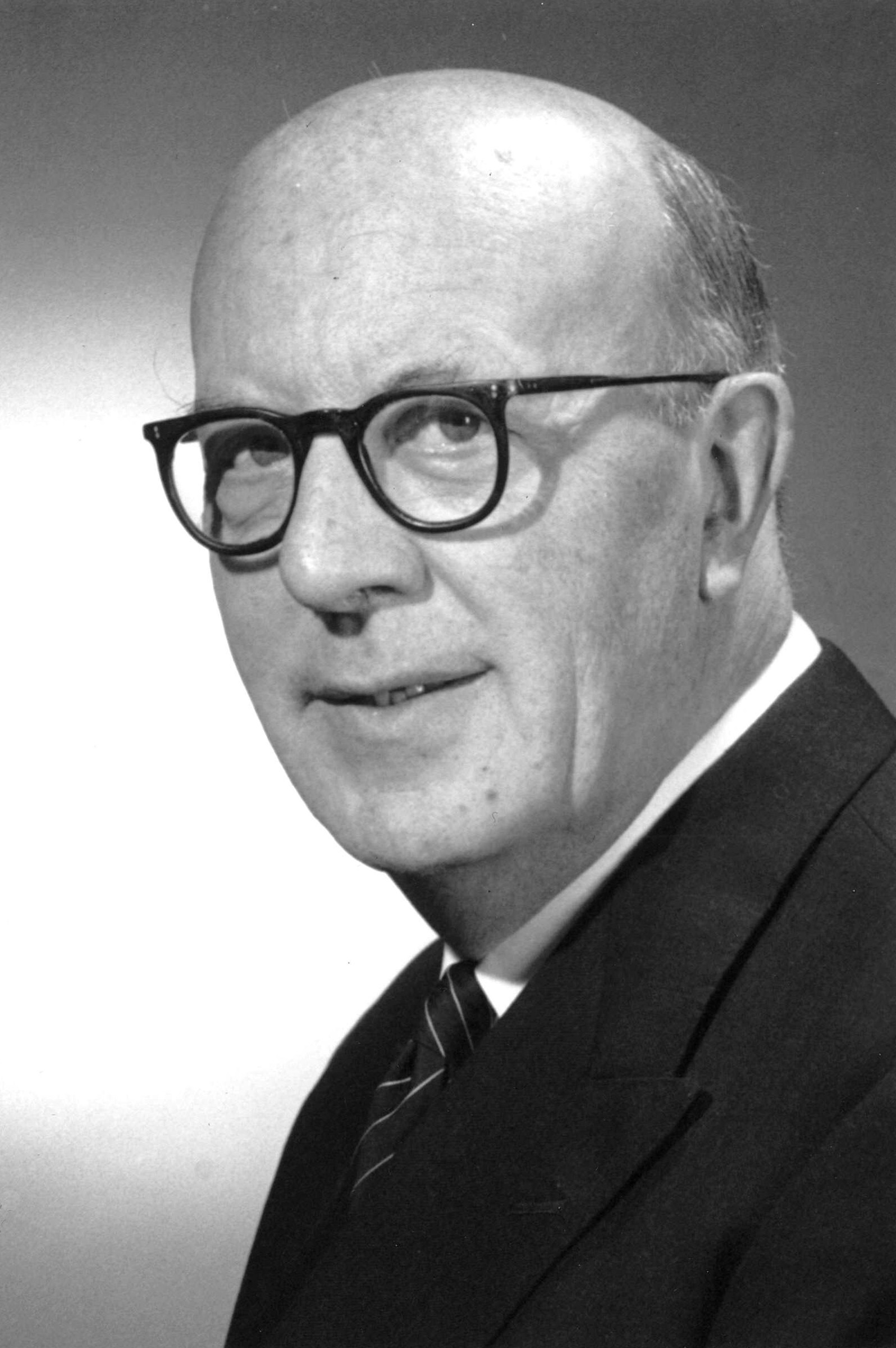
- Sir Eric Frank Scowen (ca. 1970)
- Born: Eric Frank Scowen; 22 April 1910; East Ham, Essex
- Died: 23 November 2001 (aged 91); Westminster, London
- Occupations: Physician and professor of medicine
- Known for: expertise on control of medicines

Sir Eric Frank Scowen (22 April 1910 – 23 November 2001) was an English physician and professor of medicine.

== Biography ==
After education at the City of London School he entered in 1926 St Bartholomew's Hospital Medical School, qualifying MRCP in 1931 and graduating MB BS (Lond.) in 1932. At St Bartholomew's Hospital he was a house physician under Francis Richard Fraser. Scowen graduated MD (Lond.) in 1935. He was briefly chief assistant at the Royal Brompton Hospital. In 1936 at St Bartholomew's Hospital Scowen was appointed an assistant physician and also assistant director of the medical unit. In 1937 Scowen was awarded a Rockefeller Fellowship and studied endocrinology with Philip Edward Smith at Columbia University in Manhattan and with James Howard Means and Fuller Albright at Massachusetts General Hospital in Boston. In 1938 Scowen returned to St Bartholomew's Hospital as a reader in medicine. During WWII he lived in the centre of London and worked at St Bartholomew's Hospital, helping to organise the hospital's fire-fighting and air-raid protection. There he was appointed in 1945 an assistant physician, in 1955 a director of the medical professorial unit, and in 1961 a professor of medicine, retiring in 1975. He graduated DSc in 1962.

During the 14 years he occupied the chair of medicine he became internationally recognized as an expert on the control of medicines. He chaired the British Pharmacopoeia Commission and was later a member and then chairman of the Committee on the Safety of Drugs. In 1969 he was made chairman of the newly formed Committee on Safety of Medicines.

In 1977 he became chair of the council of the Imperial Cancer Research Fund and continued there for many years, promoting the establishment of a number of Chairs of Medical Oncology outside London. He was a founder of King's College London's Centre of Medical Law and Ethics and was made a Fellow of King's College London.

== Awards and honours ==
- 1941 — Fellow of the Royal College of Physicians (FRCP)
- 1960 — Fellow of the Royal College of Physicians (FRCS)
- 1965 — Lumleian Lecturer on Cystinuria
- 1965 — Fellow of the Royal College of Physicians of Edinburgh (FRCPE)
- 1965 — Fellow of the Royal College of Pathologists (FRCPath)
- 1973 — Knighthood
- 1984 — Fellow of the Royal Pharmaceutical Society (FRPharmS)
- 1989 — Fellow of the Royal College of General Practitioners (FRCGP)
- 2001 — Honorary Fellowship of King's College London
