= James Andrew (physician) =

English physician and lecturer on medicine

- Born: 7 September 1829; Whitby, Yorkshire, England
- Died: 21 April 1897 (aged 67)
- Education: Worcester College, Oxford, Wadham College, Oxford, St Bartholomew's Hospital
- Occupations: physician and lecturer on medicine
- Known for: physician at St Bartholomew's Hospital
- Notable work: The Aetiology of Phthisis (1884), Conditions of the Pulmonary Circulation (1890)
- Spouse: Isabelle Simpson (m. 1867)
- Children: none
- Father: Reverend James Andrew, Rector of Whitby

James Andrew FRCP (7 September 1829 (Note: When he was baptised at Whitby by his father on the 20 September 1829 his father wrote that he had been "born 8th inst") – 21 April 1897 was an English physician and lecturer on medicine, known as an outstanding teacher.

Andrew was born in Whitby, Yorkshire on 7 September 1829 the youngest son of Reverend James Andrew, Rector of Whitby. After education at home and at Sedbergh School, James Andrew matriculated at Worcester College, Oxford on 9 June 1848. He subsequently obtained a scholarship at Wadham College, Oxford and migrated there, graduating B.A. in 1852 and M.A. in 1856. After a year at Edinburgh, he became a medical student at St Bartholomew's Hospital and graduated there with B.M. degree in 1860. At St Bartholomew's Hospital he was from 1861 to 1867 demonstrator of morbid anatomy, from 1864 to 1869 assistant physician, and from 1869 to 1893 full physician, retiring in 1893 to live in Bournemouth. From 1868 to 1890 he was joint lecturer in medicine at the medical school of St Bartholomew's hospital. Andrew was from 1863 to 1878 physician to the City of London Hospital for Diseases of the Chest. He took his higher doctorate of medicine (D.M.) in 1863. In 1866 he was elected F.R.C.P.

Andrew delivered the Lumleian Lectures (The Aetiology of Phthisis) in 1884 and the Harveian Oration {Conditions of the Pulmonary Circulation) in 1890.

Andrew married Isabelle Simpson in 1867 but they had no children. Andrew died on 21 April 1897 at Moorland House, Tavistock aged 67.
