= Lumleian Lectures =

Annual series started by Royal College of Physicians in 1582

- Lumleian Lectures on cerebro-spinal fever / Initialled by author
- Genre: Lectures
- Frequency: Annually
- Inaugurated: 1582

The Lumleian Lectures are a series of annual lectures started in 1582 by the Royal College of Physicians and later run by the Lumleian Trust. The name commemorates John Lumley, 1st Baron Lumley, who with Richard Caldwell of the College endowed the lectures, initially confined to surgery, but expanded to cover general medicine. William Harvey did not announce his work on the circulation of the blood in the Lumleian Lecture for 1616 although he had some notes on the heart and blood which led to the discovery of the circulation ten years later. By that time ambitious plans for a full anatomy course based on weekly lectures had been scaled back to a lecture three times a year.

Initially the appointment of the Lumleian lecturer was for life, later reduced to five years, and since 1825 made annually, although for some years it was awarded for two years in succession.

== Lecturers (incomplete list) ==
- 1582–1602 Richard Forster
- 1602–1607 William Dunn
- 1607–1615 Thomas Davies
- 1615–1628, lectured until 1656 but not every year William Harvey
- 1656 Charles Scarburgh
- 1666–1678 Rebuilding college after Great Fire of London.
- 1694–1710 Samuel Collins
- 1710–1732 Walter Harris (1711, De Ossibus Capitis; 1714, On Phlegmon;1715, De Erysipelate et de Morbis Cutaneis; 1716, De Febribus)
- 1732-? Henry Plumtre
- 1740–1745 Robert Nesbitt
- 1746–1750 Frank Nicholls, (1746, De Anima Medica; 1749, De Principiis Animalibus Exercitationes)
- 1750–1755 William Battie
- 1755-? Thomas Lawrence
- 1773–?1786 Swithin Adee (died 1786)
- 1786–1789 Thomas Heald
- 1789–1811 James Hervey

=== 1811–1900 ===
- 1811–1822 Richard Powell
- 1827 Peter Mere Latham ,On Some Diseases of the Heart
- 1829–1830 John Elliotson, Recent Improvements in the Art of Distinguishing the various Diseases of the Heart.
- 1831–1832 Thomas Watson
- 1833–1834 Francis Hawkins, On Some Diseases of the Heart
- 1835 Francis Bisset Hawkins On Some Diseases of the Heart
- 1837 Richard Bright, Disorders of the Brain
- 1839 Thomas Mayo
- 1840–1841 Francis Hawkins
- 1842 Thomas Mayo
- 1843–1844 George Burrows, On Disorders of the Cerebral Circulation
- 1845 George William Lefevre
- 1847–1848 James Arthur Wilson, On Pain
- 1849–1850 Robert Bentley Todd, On the Pathology and Treatment of Convulsive Diseases
- 1851 John Carr Badeley On the reciprocal agencies of mind and matter, and on insanity
- 1852–1853 James Alderson
- 1854–1855 James Copland
- 1856–1857 Robert Lee. The Structure and Physiology of the Ovaria
- 1858–1859 Alexander Tweedie, On Fevers
- 1861 T. A. Barker, Diseases of the Serous Membranes
- 1862 Charles James Blasius Williams, Successes and Failures in Medicine
- 1863 Thomas King Chambers, The Formation of Mucus and Pus
- 1864 Andrew Whyte Barclay, Fallacies in the Application of the Inductive Method of Reasoning to the Science of Medicine
- 1865 Charles Handfield Jones, On some Points in the Pathology of Nervous Diseases
- 1867 John Russell Reynolds
- 1868 William Guy
- 1870 James Risdon Bennett, Natural History and Diagnosis of Intrathoracic Cancer
- 1871 Charles West, On Some Disorders of the Nervous System in Childhood
- 1872 Richard Quain, Diseases of the Muscular Walls of the Heart
- 1873 Robert Barnes, On Convulsive Diseases of Women
- 1874 Francis Sibson, The Production of Inflammation
- 1875 Lionel Smith Beale, Life, and on Vital Action in Heath and Disease
- 1876 Samuel Osborne Habershon, On The Pathology of the Pneumogastric Nerve
- 1877 George Johnson, The Muscular Arterioles
- 1878 John Charles Bucknill, Habitual Drunkards and Insane Drunkards
- 1879 John Syer Bristowe, Pathological Relations of the Voice and Speech
- 1880 William Roberts, The Digestive Ferments, and the Preparation and use of Artificially Digested Food
- 1881 Reginald Southey, Bright's Disease
- 1882 J. Burdon Sanderson, Inflammation
- 1883 Alfred Baring Garrod, Uric Acid: Its Physiology and its Relation to Renal Calculi and Gravel
- 1884 James Andrew, The Aetiology of Phthisis
- 1885 Andrew Clark,Some Points in the Natural History of Primitive Dry Pleurisies
- 1886 William H. Stone, The Electrical Condition of the Human Body:Man as a Conductor
- 1887 William Overend Priestley, The Pathology of Intra-Uterine Death
- 1888 William Howship Dickinson, The Tongue as an Indication of Disease
- 1889 John Harley, Enteric Fever
- 1890 John Hughlings Jackson, Convulsive Seizures
- 1891 William Henry Broadbent, Structural Diseases of the Heart
- 1892 Philip Henry Pye-Smith, Certain Points on the Aetiology of Disease
- 1893 Charles Theodore Williams, Aero-therapeutics in lung disease
- 1894 Octavius Sturges, Heart Inflammation in Children
- 1895 G. Fielding Blandford, The Diagnosis, Prognosis and Prophylaxis of Insanity
- 1896 Dyce Duckworth, The Sequels of Disease
- 1897 Henry Charlton Bastian, Some Problems in Connection with Aphasia and other Speech Defects
- 1898 Richard Douglas Powell, Principles which Govern Treatment in Diseases and Disorders of the Heart
- 1899 Samuel Gee, Bronchitis, Pulmonary Emphysema and Asthma
- 1900 Walter Butler Cheadle, On Some Cirrhoses of the Liver

=== 1901-2000 ===
- 1901 Joseph Frank Payne, On Cancer, especially of the Internal Organs
- 1902 Frederick T. Roberts, Thoracic Phthisis
- 1903 Thomas Robinson Glynn, On Infective Endocarditis mainly in its Clinical Aspects
- 1904 Frederick Taylor, Some Disorders of the Spleen
- 1905 William Henry Allchin, Nutrition and Malnutrition
- 1906 David Ferrier, On Tabes Dorsalis
- 1907 George Henry Savage, Insanity, its Causes and Increase
- 1908 Sir James Sawyer, Points of Practice in Maladies of the Heart
- 1909 Norman Moore, Pneumatic Fever and Valvular Disease
- 1910 William Osler, Angina Pectoris
- 1911 John Mitchell Bruce, Cardio-Vascular Degeneration
- 1912 Percy Kidd, Some Moot Points in the Pathology and Clinical History of Pneumonia
- 1913 Francis de Havilland Hall, Intrathoracic Aneurism
- 1914 Joseph Arderne Ormerod, Some Modern Theories concerning Hysteria
- 1915 Sidney Martin, Non-ulcerative Infections of the Colon
- 1916 Frederick Eustace Batten, Acute poliomyelitis; its nature and treatment
- 1917 G.A.Sutherland, Modern Aspects of Heart Disease
- 1918 George Frederic Still, Coeliac Disease
- 1919 Sir Humphry Rolleston, Cerebro-Spinal Fever
- 1920 John Bradford, On the Clinical Experiences of a Physician during the Campaign in France and Flanders, 1914-19.
- 1921 Arthur Whitfield, Some Points in the Aetiology of Skin Diseases
- 1923 Arthur John Hall, Epidemic Encephalitis (Encephalitis Lethargica)
- 1924 Thomas McCrae, Foreign Bodies in the Air Passage
- 1925 Hector Charles Cameron, Some Forms of Vomiting in Infancy
- 1926 Thomas Jeeves Horder, Endocarditis
- 1927 John Charlton Briscoe, The Muscular Mechanism of Respiration and its disorders
- 1928 James S. Collier, Epilepsy
- 1929 Robert A. Young, A Medical Review of Surgery of the Chest
- 1930 Carey Franklin Coombs, Syphilis of the Heart and Great Vessels
- 1931 William Henry Willcox, Toxic Jaundice
- 1932 Charles Ernest Lakin, The Borderlands of Medicine
- 1933 Charles Richard Box, Complications of the Specific Fevers
- 1934 H. Letheby Tidy, Glandular fever and infectious mononucleosis
- 1935 Joseph Shaw Bolton, The Evolution of Mind
- 1936 John Parkinson, Enlargement of the Heart
- 1937 Crighton Bramwell, Arterial Pulse in Health and Disease
- 1938 George Riddoch, Pain of Central Origin
- 1939 William W. D. Thomson, Primary Carcinoma of the Lung
- 1940 Lecture postponed due to WWII
- 1941 Philip Manson-Bahr, Amoebic Dysentery and its Effective Treatment
- 1943 A. Geoffrey Evans, Arterio-sclerotic Disease
- 1944 Hugh S. Stannus, Problems in Riboflavin and Allied Deficiencies
- 1945 Henry MacCormac, Prospect and Retrospect
- 1946 John Maurice Hardman Campbell, The paroxysmal tachycardias
- 1947 James Purdon Martin
- 1948 Frederick John Nattrass, Clinical and Social Problems of Epilepsy
- 1949 Arthur Peregrine Thomson, Problems of Ageing and Chronic Sickness
- 1950 Basil T. Parsons-Smith, Cardiac Failure
- 1951 Sir Adolphe Abrahams, Physical Exercise-Its Clinical Associations
- 1952 Robert Platt, Structural and functional adaptation in renal failure
- 1953 E. Arnold Carmichael, Hemiplegia of Early Onset and the Results of Hemisherectomy
- 1954 Derrick Melville Dunlop, Are Diabetic Degenerative Complications Preventable?
- 1955 Alexander Macdougall Cooke, Some Aspects of Skeletal Disease
- 1956 Francis Avery Jones, Clinical and Social Problems of Peptic Ulcer
- 1957 Leslie Charles Hill, Systemic Lupus Erythematosus
- 1958 John St. Clair Elkington, Cerebral Vascular Disease in the light of Modern Techniques
- 1959 Edward Johnson Wayne, Clinical and Metabolic Studies in Thyroid Disease
- 1960 Davis Evan Bedford, Disorders of the Pulmonary Circulation
- 1961 Leslie J. Witts, Some Aspects of the Pathology of Anaemia
- 1962 Robert Alexander McCance, Food, Growth and Time
- 1963 Max Leonard Rosenheim, Problems of Chronic Pyelonephritis
- 1964 Robert Russell Race
- 1965 E. F. Scowen, Cystinuria
- 1966 Cuthbert Leslie Cope, The Adrenal Cortex in Internal Medicine
- 1967 Cyril Astley Clarke, Prevention of Rh-Haemolytic Disease
- 1968 Anthony Clifford Dornhorst, Pharmacology of Circulatory Failure
- 1969 C. Bruce Perry, The Natural History of Acute Rheumatism
- 1970 Douglas Andrew Kilgour Black, Diagnosis in Renal Disease
- 1971 J. A. Fraser Roberts, Genetics in medicine
- 1972 John Parsons Shillingford, Management of Acute Myocardial Infarction over the last Ten Years
- 1973 John Guyett Scadding, Diffuse pulmonary alveolar fibrosis
- 1974 George Algernon Smart, Monitoring in medicine
- 1975 Allan George Williams Whitfield, Ankylosing Spondylitis
- 1976 Malcolm Davenport Milne, Transport Defects in Disease
- 1977 John Badenoch, The King is Dead – Some Medical Observations on the Course of English History
- 1978 Sheila Sherlock, Portal Hypertension
- 1979 Lord Walton, Muscle disease – some new perspectives
- 1980 John Forrest Goodwin, The Frontiers of Cardiomyopathy
- 1981 Sydney William Stanbury, Vitamin D and hyperparathyroidism
- 1982
- 1983 David Nicol Sharp Kerr
- 1984
- 1985 Maurice H. Lessof, Allergy and its Mechanisms
- 1986
- 1993 Gordon Michael Besser
- 1994
- 1995 Peter S. Harper, New Genes for Old Diseases; the Molecular Basis of Myotonic Dystrophy and Huntington's Disease
- 1996 M. W. Adler, Sun, Sex and Responsibility
- 1997 J. Stewart Cameron, Every Man his own Atlantic: the Nephrotic Syndrome
- 1998 Mark Pepys, C-reactive Protein and Amyloidosis from Proteins to Drugs
- 1999 Ravinder Nath Maini, Milestones in the development of anti-tumour necrosis factor & (TNFA) therapy
- 2000 Stephen Townley Holgate, Gene and environment interactions in the patho-genesis of asthma

=== 2001 onwards ===
- 2003 Rodney Phillips, Immunology as taught by Darwin
- 2004 Michael C. Sheppard, Growth Hormone – from Molecule to Mortality
- 2005 Steve Bloom, Gut feeling – the secret of satiety
- 2006 Elwyn Elias, Co-ordinated defence and the liver
- 2007 Julian Peto, Asbestos and the mesothelioma epidemic
- 2008 Jeremy J. Farrar, Globalisation and infectious diseases; a threat and an opportunity for collaborative clinical science
- 2011 Tom Babor, The art of getting science into practice in alcohol treatment – a quoi bon?
- 2012 Edward R Marcantonio, Intervention studies for delirium: the State of the Science
- 2013 David Nutt

== See also ==
- Bradshaw Lecture
- Fitzpatrick Lecture
- Goulstonian Lecture
- Harveian Oration
- Hunterian Oration
- Milroy Lectures
