= Francis de Havilland Hall =

English physician, surgeon and laryngologist

- Born: 10 April 1847; Hatfield, Hertfordshire
- Died: 21 January 1929 (aged 81); Twickenham
- Burial place: Teddington Cemetery
- Occupations: Physician, surgeon, and laryngologist
- Known for: Lumleian Lectures (1913)

Francis de Havilland Hall FRCP (1847–1929) was an English physician, surgeon, and laryngologist.

After education at Bruce Castle School, Tottenham, Francis de Havilland Hall entered in 1866 St Bartholomew's Hospital Medical School (where he was a surgical assistant to James Paget). There, Hall qualified MRCS, LSA in 1868. He then graduated MB (Lond.) and in 1872 graduated MD (Lond.). From 1868 to 1878 he held house appointments at St Bartholomew's Hospital.

After a brief time in general practice, Hall became in 1875 a medical registrar at the Westminster Hospital. There he was, for about twenty years, assistant physician in charge of the throat department and became in 1896 full physician in 1896, retiring in 1912 as consulting physician. At the Westminster Hospital Medical School he lectured on the principles and practice of medicine.

Although a specialist in throat diseases — his best known work was Diseases of the Nose and Throat (1894) — he displayed his all-round knowledge as an authority on life assurance, being elected president of the Assurance Medical Officers’ Association.

In 1879 in Tunbridge Wells, he married Amy Margaret Smith. Upon his death in 1929 he was survived by his widow, one son, and three daughters, but his younger son died of wounds in WWI.

== Awards and honours ==
- 1881 – elected FRCP
- 1903–1904 – presidency of the Medical Society of London
- 1913 – Lumleian Lecturer on Intrathoracic Aneurysm

== Selected publications ==
- Hall, F. D. (1888). "The Bearing of Albuminuria on Life Assurance". British Medical Journal. 1 (1416): 348. doi:10.1136/bmj.1.1416.348. PMC 2197491. PMID 20752196.
- Hall, F. D. (1892). "Erysipelas of the Pharynx and Larynx". British Medical Journal. 1 (1626): 434–436. doi:10.1136/bmj.1.1626.434. PMC 2419826. PMID 20753570.
- Hall, F. D. (1893). "Rhinoliths". British Medical Journal. 1 (1674): 205. doi:10.1136/bmj.1.1674.205-b. PMC 2402505.
- Hall, F. D. (1893). "The Sympathetic in Graves's Disease". British Medical Journal. 2 (1713): 970. doi:10.1136/bmj.2.1713.970-a. PMC 2422347.
- Hall, F. D. (1894). "Antitoxin Treatment of Diphtheria". British Medical Journal. 2 (1757): 513. doi:10.1136/bmj.2.1757.513. PMC 2404751.
- Hall, F. D. (1894). "Hoarseness in Life Assurance". British Medical Journal. 1 (1728): 330. doi:10.1136/bmj.1.1728.330. PMC 2403601.
- Hall, F. D. (1897). "The Lettsomian Lectures on Diseases of the Nose and Throat in Relation to General Medicine: Delivered before the Medical Society of London". British Medical Journal. 1 (1884): 319–324. doi:10.1136/bmj.1.1884.319. PMC 2432915. PMID 20756788.
- Hall, F. D. (1897). "The Lettsomian Lectures on Diseases of the Nose and Throat in Relation to General Medicine: Delivered before the Medical Society of London". British Medical Journal. 1 (1886): 448–453. doi:10.1136/bmj.1.1886.448. PMC 2433043. PMID 20756815.
- Hall, F. D. (1897). "The Lettsomian Lectures on Diseases of the Nose and Throat in Relation to General Medicine: Delivered before the Medical Society of London". British Medical Journal. 1 (1888): 579–584. doi:10.1136/bmj.1.1888.579. PMC 2433156. PMID 20756846.
- Hall, F. D. (1898). "Medical Sickness and Accident Society". British Medical Journal. 2 (1958): 117. doi:10.1136/bmj.2.1958.117. PMC 2433981.
- Hall, F. D. (1908). "Functional Aphonia in a Male". Proceedings of the Royal Society of Medicine. 1 (Laryngol Sect): 77–78. PMC 2046110. PMID 19973031.
- Hall, F. D. (1909). "An Address ON ACUTE RHEUMATISM, ITS ALLIES AND ITS COUNTERFEITS". British Medical Journal. 1 (2524): 1161–1165. doi:10.1136/bmj.1.2524.1161. PMC 2319046. PMID 20764469.
- Hall, F. D. (1909). "A Case of Chloroma: With Pathological Report". Proceedings of the Royal Society of Medicine. 2 (Med Sect): 157–176. doi:10.1177/003591570900200626. PMC 2046590. PMID 19973748.
- Hall, F. D.; Spencer, W. G. (1909). "Splenectomy for (?) Splenic Anæmia". Proceedings of the Royal Society of Medicine. 2 (Clin Sect): 238–239. doi:10.1177/003591570900200189. PMC 2047079. PMID 19973418.
- Hall, F. D. (1910). "The Medical Sickness Society". British Medical Journal. 2 (2585): 176. doi:10.1136/bmj.2.2585.176-a. PMC 2335553.
- Hall, F. D. (1912). "Bleeding and Blistering". British Medical Journal. 2 (2707): 1422. doi:10.1136/bmj.2.2707.1422-b. PMC 2334744.
- Hall, F. D. (1913). "Cure by Laughter". British Medical Journal. 2 (2754): 967. doi:10.1136/bmj.2.2754.967-c. PMC 2346276.
