= Francis Hawkins (physician, 1794–1877) =

English physician

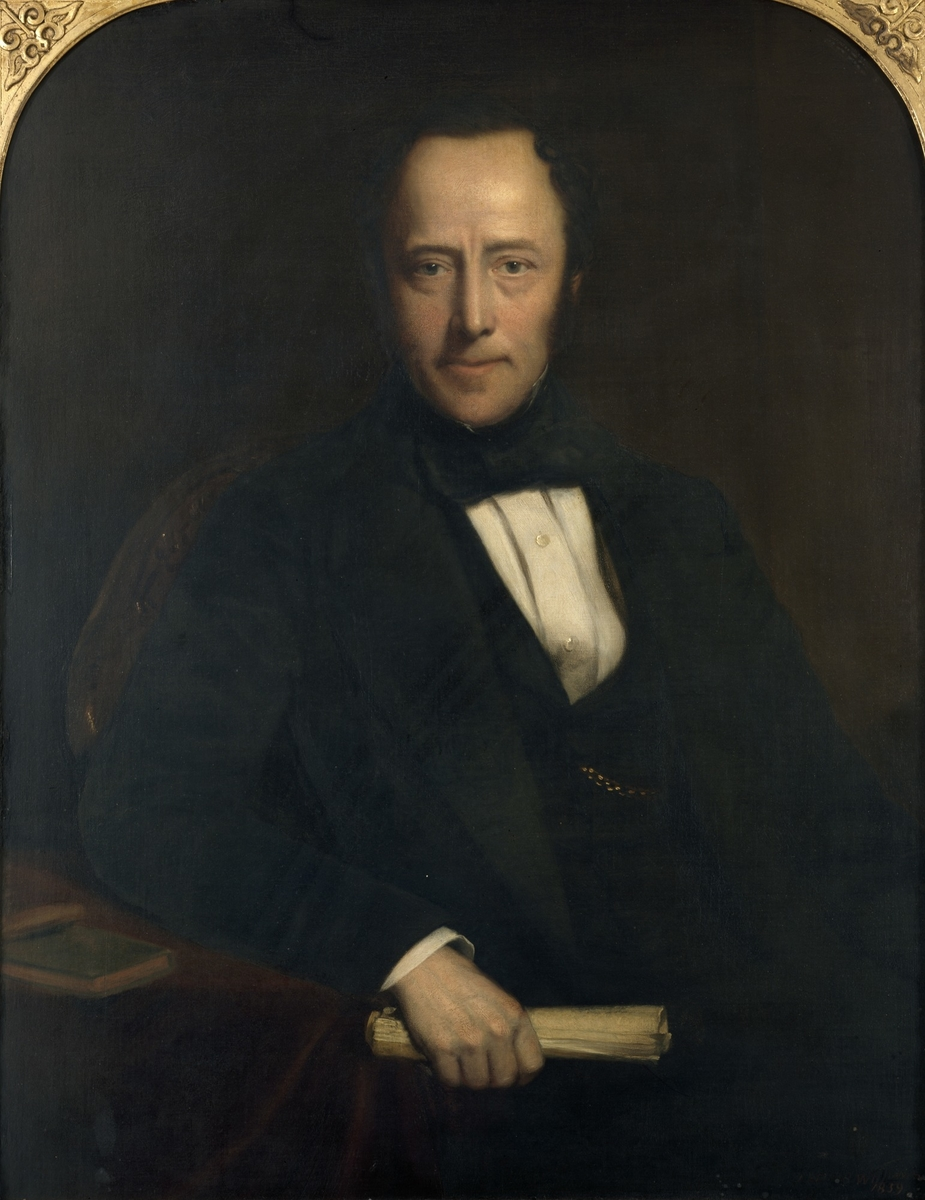
- Born: 30 July 1794; Bisley, Gloucestershire
- Died: 13 December 1877 (aged 83); London
- Occupation: Physician

Francis Hawkins (30 July 1794 – 13 December 1877) was an English physician.

== Biography ==
Hawkins born at Bisley, Gloucestershire, on 30 July 1794, was son of the Rev. Edward Hawkins and brother of Cæsar Henry Hawkins and of Edward Hawkins, D.D. He was educated at Merchant Taylors' School (1805–12) and St. John's College, Oxford, where he obtained a fellowship. He gained the Newdigate prize in 1813, and in 1816 took a double second class in classics and mathematics. He graduated B.A. 1816, B.C.L. 1819, M.B. 1820, and M.D. 16 April 1823. He was admitted inceptor candidate of the Royal College of Physicians 16 April 1821, candidate 30 September 1823, and fellow 30 September 1824. He became physician to the Middlesex Hospital in 1824, and in 1831, on the foundation of the medical faculty of King's College, London, he was elected the first professor of medicine there. This chair he resigned in 1836, and in 1858 his hospital appointment. He was physician to the royal household in the reign of William IV, and also in the reign of Queen Victoria up to his death.

Hawkins was for many years connected with the College of Physicians, in which he held various offices, and gave the Gulstonian (1826), Croonian (1827–8–9), and Lumleian (1832–4–40–1) lectures, as well as the Harveian oration (1848). But his most important services to the college were rendered as registrar, which office he held for twenty-nine years from 30 September 1829, only resigning it to become registrar of the General Medical Council on its foundation in 1858, in which capacity he remained till 1876. In each of these offices he was very highly esteemed as a good administrator and a courteous gentleman, and in each instance a special vote of thanks, accompanied by a liberal honorarium, was presented to him on resigning office. He died, 13 December 1877, in London. His portrait was in the Middlesex Hospital.

Hawkins was twice married. By his first wife, a daughter of Sir John Vaughan, he left three sons and one daughter.

Hawkins was an accomplished physician, whose genial temperament made him very popular in professional circles, and as a good scholar he was a worthy representative of the old school of university physicians. His Harveian oration in 1848 was admired for its Latin style. He wrote also ‘Lectures on Rheumatism and some Diseases of the Heart and other Internal Organs,’ London, 1826, 8vo.
