= Richard Caldwell =

English physician

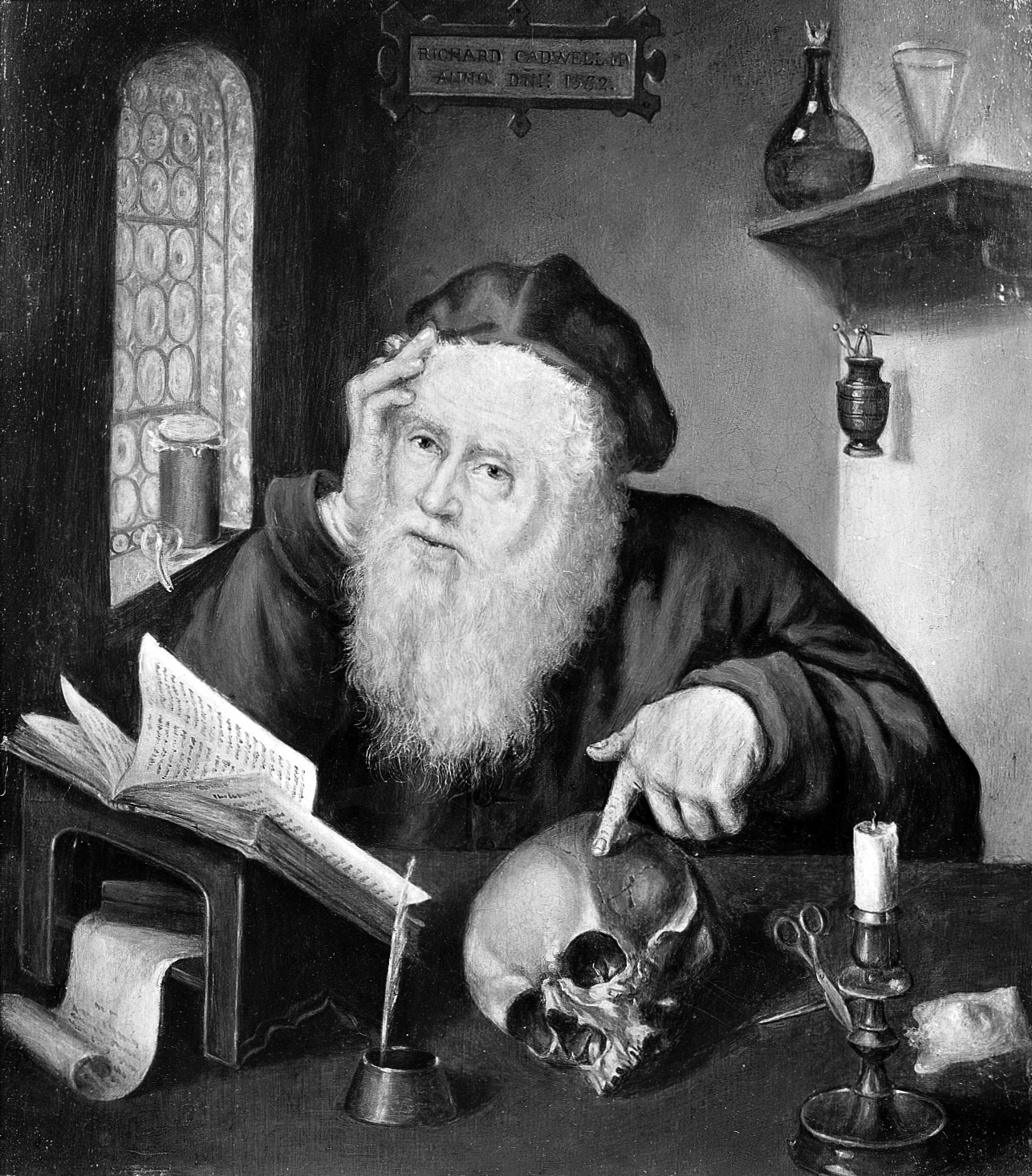

Richard Caldwell or Caldwall (1505?–1584) was an English physician, known for his part in founding the Lumleian Lectures, an annual series of anatomical demonstrations, delivered by the College of Physicians.

== Works ==
One of Caldwell's works was published, after his death. It was a translation of some Tables of Surgerie, from a Latin work by Horatius Morus of Florence, based on the writings of Jean Tagault. The book had both English and Latin text. Edward Caldwell, son or nephew, presented 500 copies to the College of Physicians.

== Notes ==
Attribution

This article incorporates text from a publication now in the public domain: Stephen, Leslie, ed. (1886). "Caldwall, Richard". Dictionary of National Biography. Vol. 8. London: Smith, Elder & Co.
