= Robert Nesbitt (physician) =

English physician

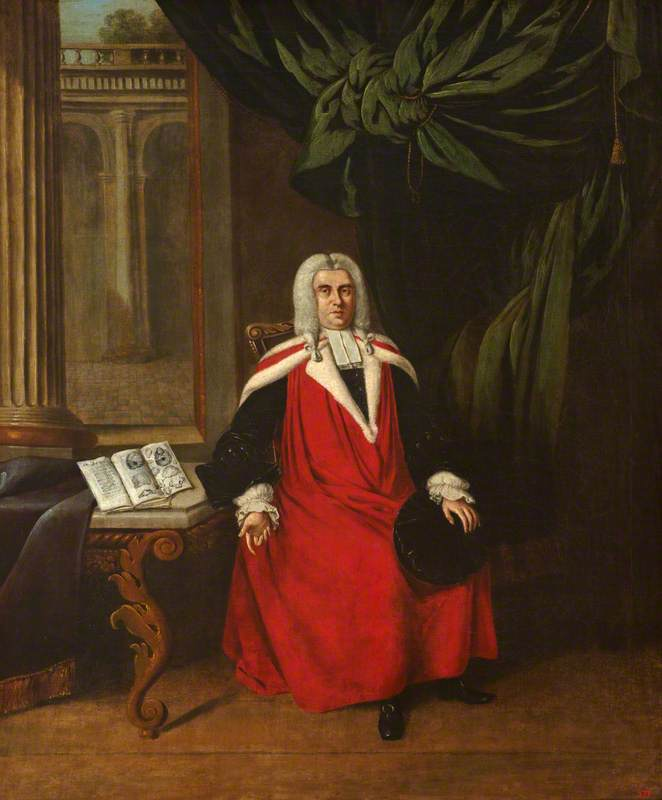
- Born: London
- Died: 27 May 1761; London
- Occupation: Physician

Robert Nesbitt, or Nisbet, FRS (died 27 May 1761) was an English physician.

== Biography ==
Nesbitt was the son of John Nesbitt, a dissenting minister. He was born in London. On 1 September 1718 he entered as a medical student at Leyden, where he attended the lectures of Herman Boerhaave and the elder Albinus, and graduated M.D. on 25 April 1721. After his return to England he practised in London as a physician. He became licentiate of the Royal College of Physicians on 25 June 1726, was created M.D. at Cambridge on 15 June 1728, and was admitted a fellow on 30 September 1729, having been ‘candidate’ at the same date in the preceding year. He filled the office of censor in 1733, 1738, 1742, 1745, and 1748, became ‘elect’ on 22 August 1748, and conciliarius in 1750, 1754, and 1758. He was appointed Lumleian lecturer for five years on 23 March 1741. Nesbitt had been elected F.R.S. as early as 22 April 1725, and two years later contributed to the ‘Transactions’ a paper ‘On a Subterraneous Fire observed in the County of Kent’ (Phil. Trans. Abridg. vii. 195). He died in London on 27 May 1761.

Nesbitt published, besides ‘Disputatio de Partu difficili’ (his Leyden thesis), ‘Human Osteogeny explained in two Lectures read in the Anatomical Theatre of the Surgeons of London, anno 1731, illustrated with Figures drawn from Life,’ 1736, 8vo. A German translation by Johann Ernst Greding appeared at Altenberg in 1753. Albrecht von Haller in his ‘Bibliotheca Anatomica’ gives a short description of the work, and calls the author ‘bonus in universum auctor.’
