= Whitfield's ointment =

Acidic ointment used for topical treatment of dermatophytosis

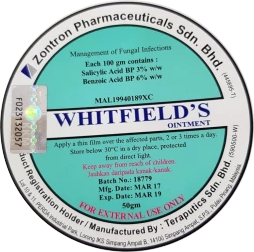
Whitfield's ointment

Whitfield's ointment is an acidic ointment used for the topical treatment of dermatophytosis, such as athlete's foot and erythrasma. It can have a slight burning effect that goes away after a few minutes. It is named after Arthur Whitfield (1868–1947), a British dermatologist.

The original ointment contains 3% salicylic acid and 6% benzoic acid in a suitable base, such as petrolatum. Alternatively, a short-chain alcohol or fatty alcohol can be used as the base.

Whitfield's ointment is not advised for areas of thinner skin, such as the scrotum or the groin, and in such sites should only be used diluted to half-strength.

A systematic review of the medical literature comparing treatments for ringworm and jock itch was generally critical of the quality of data available. It concluded that there was "insufficient evidence to determine if Whitfield's ointment, a widely used agent, is effective", implying that the studies were of poor quality and therefore effectiveness could not be determined. Individual studies support its use as a cost-effective treatment.

== See also ==
- Castellani's paint
- Friar's Balsam
- Lassar's paste
