= Octavius Sturges =

British paediatrician

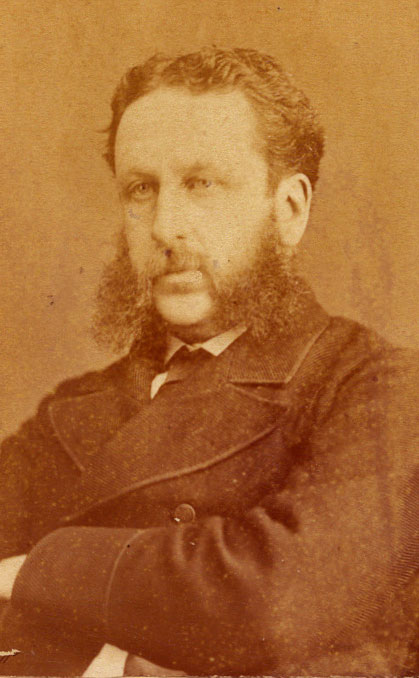
Octavius Sturges

Octavius Sturges (1833 – 3 November 1894) was a British paediatrician who coined the term "chorea".

== Early life ==
He was born in London in 1833, the eighth son (hence the name) of John and Elisabeth Sturges. He attended King's College School and then was sent to the East India Company's Addiscombe Military Seminary, Croydon. After graduation in 1852 he served two years in the army as an officer in the East India Company in Bombay, but his military career ended in his erroneous diagnosis of aortic aneurysm. In 1857 he returned to the UK.

== Career ==
In July 1858 he enrolled at Emmanuel College, Cambridge to study medicine and graduated B.A. in 1861, M.B. in 1863, and M.D. in 1867. He then began practice in St George's Hospital, becoming medical registrar in 1863. He left to be assistant-physician at the Westminster Hospital in 1868 and became full physician in 1875. He was made assistant-physician to the Hospital for Sick Children in Great Ormond Street in 1873, and full physician in 1884. At the time of his death he was senior physician there and at the Westminster Hospital.

He became a member of the Royal College of Physicians in 1863, and was elected Fellow in 1870. He delivered the 1894 Lumleian Lectures on the subject of heart inflammation in children.

He wrote a number of articles but he is best remembered for his two books The Natural History of Pneumonia (1876) and Chorea and Whooping Cough (1877)

He died in 1894 from injuries received when knocked down by a hansom cab and was buried at Kensal Green Cemetery. He was unmarried.

== Publications ==
- Chorea and Whooping Cough: Five Lectures (1877)
- On Chorea and Other Allied Movement Disorders of Early Life (1881)
- In the Company's Service: A Reminiscence with Mary Sturges (1883)
- The Natural History and Relations of Pneumonia; its Causes, Forms, and Treatment: a Clinical Study with Sidney Coupland (1890, 2nd edition); (1876, 1st edition by Octavius Sturges alone)

== Articles ==
- Abstract of a Clinical Lecture on a Fatal Case of Pneumonia after an Accident Br Med J 1879;1:300 doi:10.1136/bmj.1.948.300
- The Nomenclature of Pneumonia and other Allied Lung-Inflammations Br Med J 1881;1:11 doi:10.1136/bmj.1.1044.11
- The Heart Symptoms of Chorea Brain 1881;4(2):164-189 doi:10.1093/brain/4.2.164
- Remarks on Some Special Characters of the Present Epidemic of Typhoid Fever in London Br Med J 1882;2:1239 doi:10.1136/bmj.2.1147.1239
- The Rheumatic Origin of Chorea The Lancet 1883;122(3141):808–810 doi:10.1016/S0140-6736(02)23982-3
- The Kindred of Chorea American Journal of the Medical Sciences 1891;102(6):578-586
- The Lumleian Lectures on Heart Inflammation in Children Br Med J 1894;1:505, 1894;1:561 and 1894;1:623
- Empyema in Childhood The Lancet 1894;143(3689):1215-1216 doi:10.1016/S0140-6736(01)68982-7

== Correspondence ==
- The Westminster Hospital Br Med J 1871;2:451.3 doi:10.1136/bmj.2.563.451-b
- The Treatment of Pneumonia Br Med J 1873;2:739.1 doi:10.1136/bmj.2.677.739
- Out-Patients' Medical Relief Br Med J 1875;1:495.1 doi:10.1136/bmj.1.745.495
- Dissolution of the Medical Teachers' Association Br Med J 1876;2:840.1 doi:10.1136/bmj.2.834.840
- Is Collective Investigation Dangerous? Br Med J 1884;1:483.2 doi:10.1136/bmj.1.1210.483-a
- Collective Investigation Br Med J 1884;2:1097.1 doi:10.1136/bmj.2.1247.1041
- The Collective Investigation Committee Br Med J 1884;2:985.1 doi:10.1136/bmj.2.1246.985
- The Pathology of Acute Pneumonia Br Med J 1885;1:99.1 doi:10.1136/bmj.1.1254.99
- Pneumonic Fever, Old and New Br Med J 1889;1:1030.2 doi:10.1136/bmj.1.1479.1030-a
