= John Harley (physician) =

John Harley FRCP FLS (1833, Stanton Lacy, Shropshire – 9 December 1921, Pulborough, Sussex) was an English physician, geologist, and botanist. He gave the 1868 Goulstonian Lectures and the 1889 Lumleian Lectures.

== Biography ==
In the parish of Dawley Magna, John Harley was christened on 21 November 1833. He studied medicine at King's College London and received his medical qualification in 1858. At King's College Hospital, he held house appointments and then in 1863 was appointed assistant physician. In 1871 he left King's College Hospital to join the staff of London's St Thomas' Hospital. There he began in 1871 as an assistant physician, in 1879 became a full physician, and in 1893 was created consulting physician. He also served at the London Fever Hospital. He retired in 1902 and for the remainder of his life resided in Pulburough.

Some of his opinions of the origins of some diseases seemed contrary to what was known about bacteriology and pathology. He was widely known for his eccentric geniality with a fixed "habit of smiling, bowing, and vigorously shaking hands on every possible occasion with every acquaintance that he met."

In 1881 he lived in St George Hanover Square with his wife Maria and their five children (four daughters and a son).

Harley was elected in 1863 a Fellow of the Linnean Society of London and in 1867 a Fellow of the Royal College of Physicians. He bequeathed his geological collection to the Ludlow Museum.

== Selected publications ==
=== Articles ===
- Harley, John (1864). "On the Endemic Hæmaturia of the Cape of Good Hope". Journal of the Royal Society of Medicine. 47: 55–72. doi:10.1177/095952876404700110. PMC 2147819. PMID 20896246.
- —— (1869). "A Second Communication on the Endemic Hæmaturia of the Cape of Good Hope and Natal". Journal of the Royal Society of Medicine. 52: 379–387. doi:10.1177/095952876905200121. PMC 2150512. PMID 20896346.
- —— (1871). "A Third Communication on the Endemic Hæmaturia of the South-Eastern Coast of Africa. With Remarks on the Topical Medication of the Bladder". Journal of the Royal Society of Medicine. 54: 47–61. doi:10.1177/095952877105400103. PMC 2150475. PMID 20896377.
- —— (1872). "The Pathology of Scarlatina, and the Relation between Enteric and Scarlet Fevers". Journal of the Royal Society of Medicine. 55: 103–138. doi:10.1177/095952877205500106. PMC 2150490. PMID 20896381. (See scarlet fever.)
- —— (1874). "Cases of Disordered Muscular Movement Illustrating the Uses of Hemlock". Journal of the Royal Society of Medicine. MCT-57 (1): 119–135. doi:10.1177/095952877405700111. PMC 2150442. PMID 20896420. (See poison hemlock.)
- —— (1877). "A Case of Simple Atrophic Sclerema, Associated with Disorder of the Circulatory and Alimentary Functions". Journal of the Royal Society of Medicine. 60: 131–152. doi:10.1177/095952877706000113. PMC 2150224. PMID 20896479. (Sclermea is induration of cellular tissue.)
- —— (1878). "A Second Communication on Simple Atrophic Sclerema". Journal of the Royal Society of Medicine. 61: 101–109. doi:10.1177/095952877806100110. PMC 2150234. PMID 20896499.
- —— (1886). "A Case of So-Called Actinomycosis of the Liver". Journal of the Royal Society of Medicine. 69: 135–155. doi:10.1177/095952878606900107. PMC 2121564. PMID 20896666.
