= Allan George Williams Whitfield =

English physician

- Born: 30 January 1909; Ironbridge, Shropshire, England
- Died: 18 February 1987 (aged 78); Birmingham, England
- Occupation: Physician
- Known for: Lumleian Lectures (1975)

Allan George Williams Whitfield CBE FRCP (1909–1987) was an English physician.

== Biography ==
After education at Wellingborough School, A. George Whitfield studied medicine at the University of Birmingham, graduating there MB ChB (Birm.) in 1931. After house appointments at Birmingham General Hospital and at Queen's Hospital, Birmingham, he joined a well-established general practice in Sutton Coldfield. He joined the RAMC Territorial Force in 1933. During WWII he served as second in command of a field ambulance in France and was mentioned in dispatches. He was promoted to lieutenant colonel in 1942 and was appointed assistant director of medical services of the First Army. In 1943 a severe chest infection caused him to be invalided out, and he returned to general practice. He qualified MRCP in 1946. In 1947 he was appointed to Queen Elizabeth Hospital Birmingham as medical registrar at the, then new, professorial department of medicine. There he became, in 1948, consultant physician and lecturer in medicine to the University of Birmingham. He graduated MD in 1950 and PhD in 1955. At the University of Birmingham he was, from 1955 to 1974, director of the board of graduate medical studies and also professor of medicine from 1966 to 1974. He was editor-in-chief of the Quarterly Journal of Medicine for 13 years.

George Whitfield’s chief research interests were in lung volume, radiation damage to thoracic tissues and cardiomyopathy ... He was also interested in Victorian history and published a number of historical papers and two books Beloved Sir James, Sutton Coldfield 1982, and The First thirty-seven registrars of the College, Sutton Coldfield 1981, both published privately.

He was the author or co-author of approximately 200 publications. During the last decade of his life he wrote, with Sir Cyril Clarke, reports on clinical epidemiology in internal medicine.

George Whitfield was typical of all that is best in general physicians, and he could sum up people admirably, as evidenced by the frequency with which he was asked to write obituaries for colleagues. Just before he died he had submitted a chapter to a book on medical writing, still to be published. His contribution dealt with writing an obituary for a colleague: ‘That,’ he said to a friend, with a smile, ‘will give you something to chuckle about after I’ve gone.’

In 1937 in Sutton Coldfield he married Barbara Franks. They had a daughter.

== Awards and honours ==
- 1953 — elected FRCP
- 1970 — President of the West Midlands Physicians Association
- 1974 — appointed CBE
- 1975 — Lumleian Lecturer on Ankylosing spondylitis
- 1978 — Fellow of the Faculty of Community Medicine
- 1983 — Croonian Sermonizer
- 1986 — Harveian Orator on Royal physicians

== See also ==
- Sir James Clark, 1st Baronet (subject of the biography Beloved Sir James: the life of Sir James Clark, Bart., Physician to Queen Victoria, 1788–1870, 280 pages by George Whitfield)

== Selected publications ==
- Whitfield, A. G.; Waterhouse, J. A.; Arnott, W. M. (1950). "The Total Lung Volume and its Subdivisions. A Study in Physiological Norms: I. Basic Data". British Journal of Social Medicine. 4 (1): 1–25. doi:10.1136/jech.4.1.1. PMC 1037244. PMID 15426746.
- Whitfield, A. G.; Waterhouse, J. A.; Arnott, W. M. (1950). "The Total Lung Volume and its Subdivisions: II. The Effect of Posture". British Journal of Social Medicine. 4 (2): 86–97. doi:10.1136/jech.4.2.86. PMC 1012555. PMID 15434308.
- Whitfield, A. G.; Waterhouse, J. A.; Arnott, W. M. (1950). "The Total Lung Volume and its Subdivisions: III.—Correlation with other Anthropometric Data". British Journal of Social Medicine. 4 (3): 113–136. doi:10.1136/jech.4.3.113. PMC 1037250. PMID 14777883.
- Whitfield, A. G.; Arnott, W. M. (1951). "Transient Disturbances of Consciousness in Hepatic Cirrhosis". British Medical Journal. 2 (4739): 1054–1056. doi:10.1136/bmj.2.4739.1054. PMC 2070619. PMID 14869811.
- Richards, D. G.; Whitfield, A. G.; Arnott, W. M.; Waterhouse, J. A. (1951). "The Lung Volume in Low Output Cardiac Syndromes". British Heart Journal. 13 (3): 381–386. doi:10.1136/hrt.13.3.381. PMC 479432. PMID 14848394.
- Whitfield, A. G. (1952). "Emphysema". British Medical Journal. 2 (4796): 1227–1232. doi:10.1136/bmj.2.4796.1227. PMC 2022144. PMID 12997720.
- Richards, D. G.; Whitfield, A. G.; Arnott, W. M.; Waterhouse, J. A. (1953). "The Lung Volume in Hyperkinetic States". British Heart Journal. 15 (1): 83–86. doi:10.1136/hrt.15.1.83. PMC 503814. PMID 13018979.
- Smith, W. T.; Whitfield, A. G. (1954). "Intra-vascular Micro-embolic Carcinomatosis as a Cause of Purpura. Report of a Case Associated with Focal Histological Lesions in the Nervous System". British Journal of Cancer. 8 (1): 97–106. doi:10.1038/bjc.1954.7. PMC 2007925. PMID 13172386.
- Whitfield, A. G. (1955). "Chlorpromazine Jaundice". British Medical Journal. 1 (4916): 784–785. doi:10.1136/bmj.1.4916.784-a. PMC 2061512.
- Whitfield, A. G.; Kunkler, P. B. (1957). "Radiation Reactions in the Heart". British Heart Journal. 19 (1): 53–58. doi:10.1136/hrt.19.1.53. PMC 503362. PMID 13396077.
- Brown, R. G.; McKeown, T.; Whitfield, A. G. (1957). "A Note on the Association between Smoking and Disease in Men in the Seventh Decade". British Journal of Preventive & Social Medicine. 11 (3): 162–164. doi:10.1136/jech.11.3.162. PMC 1058671. PMID 13471907.
- Brown, R. G.; McKeown, T.; Whitfield, A. G. (1958). "Observations on the Medical Condition of Men in the Seventh Decade". British Medical Journal. 1 (5070): 555–562. doi:10.1136/bmj.1.5070.555. PMC 2027911. PMID 13510725.
- Edwards, F.; McKeown, T.; Whitfield, A. G. (1959). "Contributions and Demands of Elderly Men". British Journal of Preventive & Social Medicine. 13 (2): 59–66. doi:10.1136/jech.13.2.59. PMC 1058733. PMID 13662597.
- Edwards, F.; McKeown, T.; Whitfield, A. G. (1959). "Incidence of Disease and Disability in Elderly Men". British Journal of Preventive & Social Medicine. 13 (2): 51–58. doi:10.1136/jech.13.2.51. PMC 1058732. PMID 13662596.
- Melnick, S. C.; Whitfield, A. G. (1962). "Polyneuritis in Hæmochromatosis". Postgraduate Medical Journal. 38 (444): 580–583. doi:10.1136/pgmj.38.444.580. PMC 2482151. PMID 13934734.
- Crews, S. J.; Whitfield, A. G. (1963). "Sjögren's Syndrome". Postgraduate Medical Journal. 39 (452): 324–336. doi:10.1136/pgmj.39.452.324. PMC 2482264. PMID 14023839. 1963
- Whitfield, A. G.; Bond, W. H.; Kunkler, P. B. (1963). "Radiation Damage to Thoracic Tissues". Thorax. 18 (4): 371–380. doi:10.1136/thx.18.4.371. PMC 1018788. PMID 14085658.
- Whitfield, A. G. (1964). "The Postgraduate's Opinion of his Undergraduate Medical Education". Postgraduate Medical Journal. 40 (464): 313–316. doi:10.1136/pgmj.40.464.313. PMC 2482893. PMID 14154951.
- Record, R. G.; Whitfield, A. G. (1964). "Prevalence of and Mortality from Coronary Artery Disease in Men". British Journal of Preventive & Social Medicine. 18 (4): 202–209. doi:10.1136/jech.18.4.202. PMC 1058969. PMID 14216081.
- Whitfield, A. G. (1971). "The Scientific Basis of Medicine". Proceedings of the Royal Society of Medicine. 64 (2): 236–237. doi:10.1177/003591577106400221 (inactive 1 July 2025). PMC 1812456.
- Whitfield, A. G. (1972). "Iatrogenic misadventure". British Medical Journal. 1 (5802): 733–734. doi:10.1136/bmj.1.5802.733. PMC 1787636. PMID 5015329. 1972
- Kendall, M. J.; Lawrence, D. S.; Shuttleworth, G. R.; Whitfield, A. G. (1973). "Haematology and Biochemistry of Ankylosing Spondylitis". British Medical Journal. 2 (5860): 235–237. doi:10.1136/bmj.2.5860.235. PMC 1589391. PMID 4144722.
- Whitfield, A. G. (1977). "The Last Illness of the Prince Consort". Journal of the Royal College of Physicians of London. 12 (1): 96–102. doi:10.1016/S0035-8819(25)02983-6. PMC 5366703. PMID 336875.
- Whitfield, A. G. (1977). "Clark and Combe: Fact and Fantasy". Journal of the Royal College of Physicians of London. 11 (3): 268–272. doi:10.1016/S0035-8819(25)03001-6. PMC 5368722. PMID 323474.
- Whitfield, A. G. (1978). "How to chair a committee". British Medical Journal. 2 (6142): 936–937. doi:10.1136/bmj.2.6142.936. PMC 1608053. PMID 709138.
- Whitfield, A. G. (1979). "Peel's fall". Annals of the Royal College of Surgeons of England. 61 (2): 158–160. PMC 2492800. PMID 373575.
- Robson, K.; Whitfield, A. G. (1979). "Baldwin Hamey Junior—Ninth Registrar". Journal of the Royal College of Physicians of London. 13 (4): 189–192. doi:10.1016/S0035-8819(25)02857-0. PMC 5373287. PMID 393814.
- Whitfield AG CBE (1980). "Disraeli's Doctors". Journal of the Royal College of Physicians of London. 14 (3): 202–204. doi:10.1016/S0035-8819(25)02826-0. PMC 5373223. PMID 7009849.
- Clarke, C.; Hine, K. R.; Dykes, P. W.; Whitehead, T. P.; Whitfield, A. G. (1980). "Carcinoembryonic Antigen and Smoking". Journal of the Royal College of Physicians of London. 14 (4): 227–228. doi:10.1016/S0035-8819(25)02803-X. PMC 5373255. PMID 7452527.
- Clarke, C.; Whitfield, A. G. (1980). "Rhesus immunisation during pregnancy: The case for antenatal anti-D". British Medical Journal. 280 (6218): 903–904. doi:10.1136/bmj.280.6218.903-a. PMC 1601041. PMID 6770941.
- Clarke, C.; Whitfield, A. G. (1980). "Deaths from rhesus haemolytic disease in England and Wales in 1978: Accuracy of records and assessment of anti-D prophylaxis". British Medical Journal. 281 (6243): 781–782. doi:10.1136/bmj.281.6243.781. PMC 1714058. PMID 6775748.
- Whitfield, A. G. (1981). "Cause of Death?". Journal of the Royal College of Physicians of London. 15 (4): 231. doi:10.1016/S0035-8819(25)02737-0. PMC 5377697. PMID 30667912.
- Whitfield AG CBE (1981). "Roger Marbeck—First Registrar". Journal of the Royal College of Physicians of London. 15 (1): 59–60. doi:10.1016/S0035-8819(25)02793-X. PMC 5377639. PMID 7007632.
- Clarke, C.; Whitfield, A. G. (1982). "The Autopsy in Deaths under Fifty". Journal of the Royal College of Physicians of London. 16 (3): 152–158. doi:10.1016/S0035-8819(25)02681-9. PMC 5377725. PMID 7108823.
- Whitfield, A. G. (1983). "Physician to the Prince of Wales". Journal of the Royal College of Physicians of London. 17 (4): 231–234. doi:10.1016/S0035-8819(25)02624-8. PMC 5370862. PMID 6358481.
- Bayliss, R.; Clarke, C.; Oakley, C.; Somerville, W.; Whitfield, A. G. (1983). "The teeth and infective endocarditis". British Heart Journal. 50 (6): 506–512. doi:10.1136/hrt.50.6.506. PMC 481451. PMID 6360190.
- Alderson, M. R.; Bayliss, R. I.; Clarke, C. A.; Whitfield, A. G. (1983). "Death certification". British Medical Journal (Clinical Research Ed.). 287 (6390): 444–445. doi:10.1136/bmj.287.6390.444. PMC 1548693. PMID 6411165.
- Bayliss, R.; Clarke, C.; Oakley, C. M.; Somerville, W.; Whitfield, A. G.; Young, S. E. (1983). "The microbiology and pathogenesis of infective endocarditis". British Heart Journal. 50 (6): 513–519. doi:10.1136/hrt.50.6.513. PMC 481452. PMID 6651993.
- Bayliss, R.; Clarke, C.; Oakley, C. M.; Somerville, W.; Whitfield, A. G.; Young, S. E. (1984). "The bowel, the genitourinary tract, and infective endocarditis". British Heart Journal. 51 (3): 339–345. doi:10.1136/hrt.51.3.339. PMC 481509. PMID 6696812.
- Clarke, C. A.; Mollison, P. L.; Whitfield, A. G. (1985). "Deaths from Rh(D) haemolytic disease of the newborn in England and Wales". British Medical Journal (Clinical Research Ed.). 291 (6509): 1647–1648. doi:10.1136/bmj.291.6509.1647-c. PMC 1418426. PMID 3935224.
- Whitfield, A. G. (1985). "Bicentenary of an Account of the Foxglove. Historical address given at Edgbaston Parish Church, Birmingham". British Heart Journal. 54 (3): 253–255. doi:10.1136/hrt.54.3.253. PMC 481891. PMID 3899149.
- Whitfield, A. G. (1984). "The Scholar Prince". Journal of the Royal College of Physicians of London. 18 (3): 195–197. doi:10.1016/S0035-8819(25)02581-4. PMC 5370883. PMID 6381724.
- Whitfield AG CBE (1985). "In Sickness and in Health". Journal of the Royal College of Physicians of London. 19 (2): 115–118. doi:10.1016/S0035-8819(25)02533-4. PMC 5371013. PMID 3889319.
- "Counselling in general practice". Journal of the Royal Society of Medicine. 78 (9): 785–786. 1985. PMC 1289907. PMID 4045908.
- Bayliss R KCVO; Clarke C KBE; Oakley, C. M.; Somerville, W.; Whitfield AG CBE; Young, S. E. (1986). "Incidence, Mortality and Prevention of Infective Endocarditis". Journal of the Royal College of Physicians of London. 20 (1): 15–20. doi:10.1016/S0035-8819(25)02471-7. PMC 5371129. PMID 3944771.
- Whitfield, A. G. (1986). "The Gentle Queen". Journal of the Royal College of Physicians of London. 20 (1): 63–66. doi:10.1016/S0035-8819(25)02481-X. PMC 5371124. PMID 30667827.
- Bayliss, R.; Clarke, C.; Whitfield, A. G. (1986). "The Female Life Span". Journal of the Royal College of Physicians of London. 20 (4): 290–293. doi:10.1016/S0035-8819(25)02435-3. PMC 5371035. PMID 3772851.
- Whitfield AG CBE; Bayliss R KCVO; Clarke C KBE (1987). "Deaths in the First 20 Years and Problems of the Sex Ratio at Birth". Journal of the Royal College of Physicians of London. 21 (4): 270–274. doi:10.1016/S0035-8819(25)02347-5. PMC 5379372. PMID 3681787.
- Bayliss, R.; Clarke, C.; Whitfield, A. G. (1987). "Problems in Comparative Longevity". Journal of the Royal College of Physicians of London. 21 (2): 134–139. doi:10.1016/S0035-8819(25)02390-6. PMC 5379454. PMID 3585833.
