= Arthur Whitfield =

English physician, professor of medicine and pioneer of dermatology

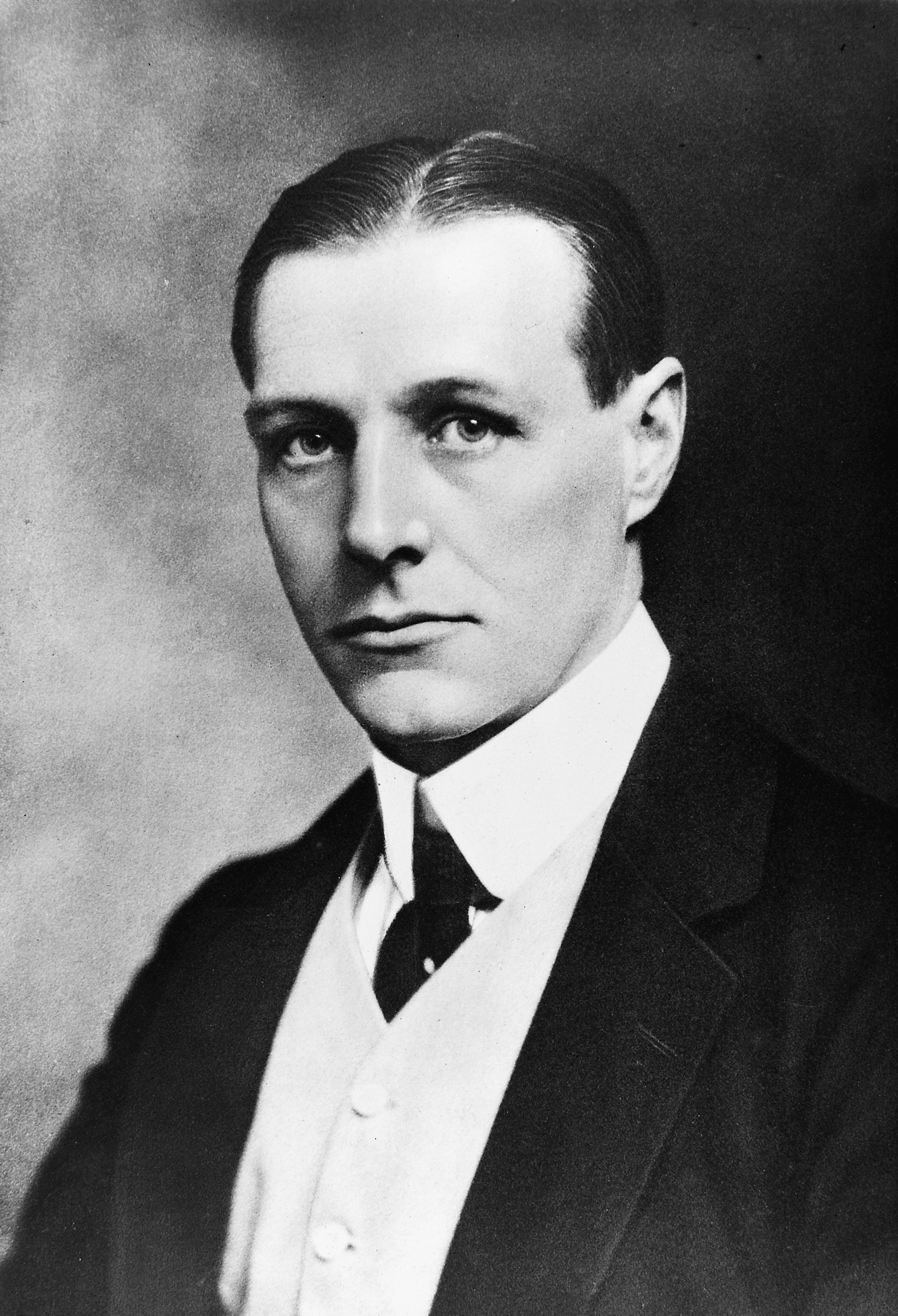
- Portrait of Arthur Whitfield courtesy of Wellcome Trust
- Born: 13 October 1868; London
- Died: 31 January 1947 (aged 78); Eastbourne
- Occupations: Physician and dermatologist
- Known for: Whitfield's ointment

Arthur Whitfield FRCP (1868–1947) was an English physician, professor of medicine, and pioneer of dermatology.

== Biography ==
After education at King's College School, Arthur Whitfield began his study medicine in 1887 at King's College Hospital and qualified from there LRCP MRCS in 1891 and graduated MB (Lond.) in 1892. He held successively several house appointments, including the Sambrooke Medical Registrarship, at King's College Hospital. In 1893 he qualified MRCP and graduated MD. From 1893 to 1896 he pursued postgraduate study at clinics in Vienna and Berlin. He was appointed in 1896 assistant physician to the West London Hospital and then at the Royal Northern Hospital. At King's College Hospital he was appointed in 1896 assistant physician, with charge of the skin department, and in 1906 full physician and professor of dermatology. There he was also dean of the medical school from 1904 to 1905, and during WWI he was a general physician in charge of outpatients. Whitfield held additional appointments as professor of dermatology at the Royal Army Medical College and dermatologist to St Dustan's.

Whitfield's A Handbook of Skin Diseases and their Treatment (1907) had a revised second edition in 1921. A third edition was completed by Edmund Harold Molesworth, his Australian ex-pupil. Whitfield contributed articles on skin diseases to Encyclopædia Medica and to Allbutt's A System of Medicine, as well as numerous papers on skin diseases to medical journals.

In 1911 he was able to demonstrate, at the Royal Society of Medicine, a patient with "eczematoid ringworm of the groins" along with supportive mycological specimens. This prompted a special visit from Paris by Professor Sabouraud.

Whitfield was elected FRCP in 1905. He was the Lumleian Lecturer in 1921. He was president of the British Association of Dermatologists in 1926–1927. He was elected a corresponding member of the Société Française de Dermatologie.

His most valued research concerned fungus infections – in particular, the causative role of fungi in tinea pedis and its treatment with "Whitfield's ointment".

The original formula for Whitfield's ointment consists of benzoic acid — 25 grains (1.6 gram) (5%); salicylic acid — 15 grains (1 gram) (3%); soft paraffin — (128 minims) (7.1 millilitres) (25%); coconut oil — to 10 fluid ounces (28 millilitres).

He was an important pioneer of dermatology among the group of British physicians who followed Henry Radcliffe Crocker, William Tilbury Fox, and Thomas Colcott Fox.

His garden at Beaconsfield provided a hobby for his leisure, and he enjoyed a game of golf or tennis. He married Margaret, daughter of Charles Tuttle of Rochester, New York, and had one son and two daughters.

== Selected publication ==
- Whitfield, A. (1909). "Chronic Enlargement of the Lips due to Syphilitic Lymphangitis". Proc R Soc Med. 2(Dermatol Sect) (Dermatol Sect): 99–102. PMC 2046921. PMID 19973557.
- Whitfield, A. (1910). "Some Points in the Pathology of Acne". Proc R Soc Med. 3(Pathol Sect) (Pathol Sect): 172–174. PMC 1960810. PMID 19974662.
- Whitfield, A. (1920). "Case of Demodex Impetigo". Proc R Soc Med. 13(Dermatol Sect) (Dermatol Sect): 102–104. PMC 2152159. PMID 19980909.
