= Gustave Louis Maurice Strauss =

British writer (died 1887)

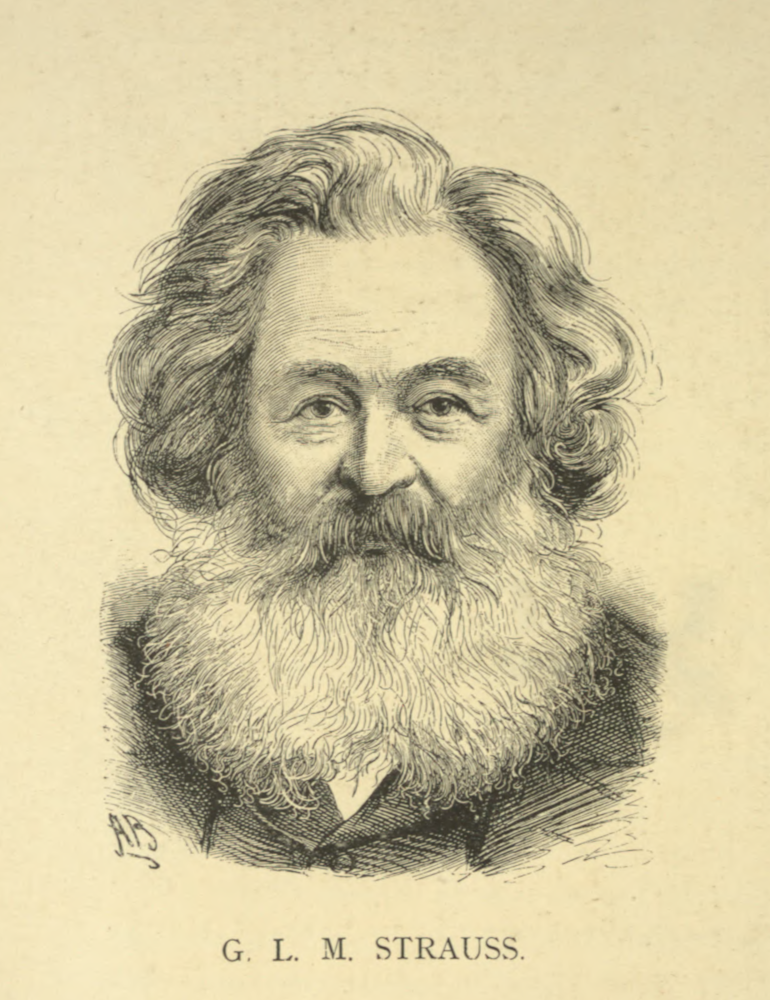
- Born: c. 1807; Trois-Rivières, Lower Canada
- Died: 2 September 1887; Teddington, United Kingdom
- Resting place: Teddington Cemetery
- Writing career
- Pen name: An Old Bohemian
- Notable work: The Old Ledger (1865)

Gustave Louis Maurice Strauss (c. 1807 – 2 September 1887) was a Canadian-born British writer, active in a wide range of literary and professional pursuits. He was known in London literary circles as the "Old Bohemian" and was a founding member of the Savage Club.

== Early life and education ==
Gustave Louis Maurice Strauss was born in Trois-Rivières, Lower Canada, around 1807. Although a British subject, he claimed Italian, French, German, and Sarmatian ancestry. (Note: Although The Jewish Encyclopedia contains an entry on Strauss, he had no documented Jewish heritage. Indeed, Strauss recounts in his autobiography that he was "duly confirmed in the true Protestant faith of [his] forefathers" at the age of fifteen by Dr. Dennhardt of the Holy Ghost Church in Magdeburg.) In 1812 he moved with his family to Europe, settling in Linden, near Hanover, by about 1816.

After the death of his father, he was sent to study at the Klosterschule in Magdeburg. Strauss later studied at the University of Berlin, where he earned a Doctor of Philosophy degree, and at the Montpellier School of Medicine in France.

== Political activity and military service ==
Strauss visited England in 1832, accompanying Legros, a wealthy man from Marseille, on an industrial tour. Returning to Germany in 1833, he took part in liberal political demonstrations, including the student uprising in Frankfurt am Main on 3 April 1833. Following the suppression of the revolt, he escaped to France. The Prussian government confiscated his property, returned it to him only in 1840.

Later in 1833, Strauss joined the French Army in Algiers as an assistant surgeon, initially attached to the French Foreign Legion. He left the Legion in 1834 and, after several years' service, returned to France. While there, he contributed to the Republican National and other journals. In 1839 he was expelled for alleged involvement in a revolutionary plot.

== Career in Britain ==
After his banishment from France, Strauss settled in London, initially working as secretary and assistant to a homeopathic physician. In England, Strauss variously worked as an author, linguist, chemist, politician, cook, journalist, tutor, dramatist, and surgeon. Strauss published a range of works, including fiction, theatre, language textbooks, historical and biographical studies, culinary books, and translations. He became known in literary and artistic circles as the "Old Bohemian" and the "Poisoner's Friend," and was one of the founders of the Savage Club in 1857.

In 1865 he published the novel The Old Ledger, which The Athenaeum criticised as "vulgar, profane, and indelicate." Strauss sued the publication for libel in the Kingston Assizes; the case was settled by mutual consent. After The Athenaeum repeated its criticism in April 1866, Strauss brought a second suit. Lord Chief Justice Cockburn supported the defendants' position, and the jury ruled in their favour.

His autobiography, The Reminiscences of an Old Bohemian, was published in two volumes in 1882. It was described by Arthur Conan Doyle as "splendidly written" and "an interesting gossippy book," and by George Augustus Sala as "a diverting autobiography in which fiction is liberally mingled with fact."

Strauss contributed to numerous London periodicals, including The Chemist and Druggist, Tinsleys' Magazine, Punchinello, The Lancet, the Morning Advertiser, and The Grocer, of which he was the first editor. He notably covered the Austro-Prussian War as a correspondent and was present at the Battle of Sadowa. According to publisher William Tinsley, Strauss frequently acted as a ghostwriter for other authors. Strauss also wrote for the stage, and his farce A Model Uncle was successfully produced at Drury Lane Theatre in 1868 by Frederick Chatterton.

== Later life and death ==
Strauss faced financial difficulties later in life. Gladstone arranged for him to receive a civil list pension, though he remained in modest circumstances. In 1879 he entered the Charterhouse almshouse, later receiving an outpension from its governors.

He died unmarried in Teddington, England, on 2 September 1887.

== Selected publications ==
- The German Reader. London: J. Weale. 1852.
- A Grammar of the German Language. London: J. Weale. 1852.
- A Grammar of the French Language. London: J. Weale. 1853.
- Moslem and Frank. London: J. Weale. 1854.
- Mahometism: An Historical Sketch (2nd ed.). Cambridge: J. Weale. 1858.
- England's Workshops. London: Groombridge & Sons. 1864. With C. W. Quin, John C. Brough, Thomas Archer, and W. J. Prowse.
- The Old Ledger: A Novel. Vol. 1–3. London: Tinsley Brothers. 1865.
- Men Who Have Made the German Empire. Vol. 1–2. London: Tinsley Brothers. 1875.
- The Reminiscences of an Old Bohemian. Vol. 1–2. London: Tinsley Brothers. 1882.
- Stories by an Old Bohemian. London. 1883.
- Philosophy in the Kitchen: General Hints on Foods and Drinks. London: Ward & Downey. 1885.
- Dishes and Drinks. London: Ward & Downey. 1887.
- The Emperor William. London: Ward & Downey. 1888.
