= George Fielding Blandford =

British physician

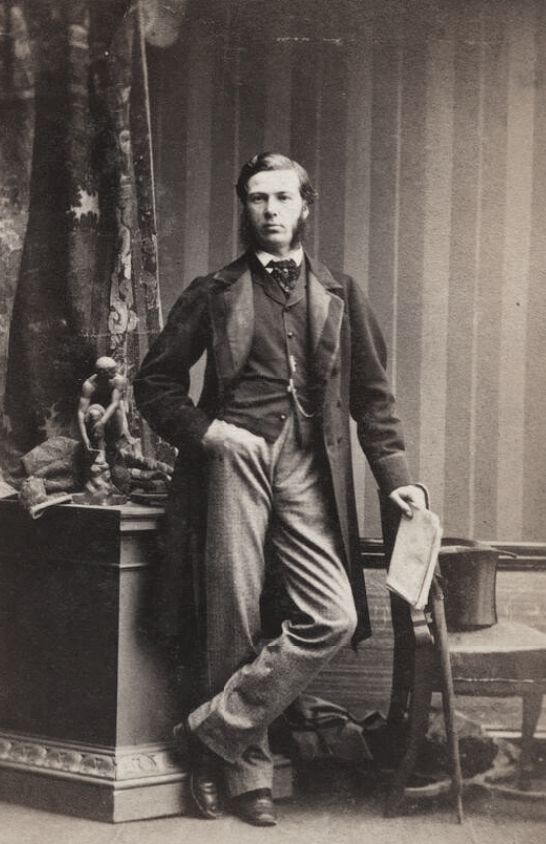
- George Fielding Blandford, 1861 photograph
- Born: 7 March 1829; Hindon, Wiltshire, England
- Died: 18 August 1911 (aged 82); Tunbridge Wells
- Known for: Insanity and its Treatment (1871)

George Fielding Blandford FRCP (1829–1911) was a British physician, known as a psychiatrist. He was author of Insanity and its Treatment (1871), which went through four editions and was translated into German.

== Biography ==
After education from 1840 to 1841 at Tonbridge School and from 1841 to 1848 at Rugby School, G. Fielding Blandford matriculated in 1848 at Wadham College, Oxford, graduating BA in 1852 and MA in 1857. In October 1852 he began the study of medicine at St George's Hospital, London, graduating BM (Oxon.) in 1857. In 1857 he also qualified LSA. He qualified MRCS in 1858 and MRCP in 1860.

In 1857 Blandford sometimes took holiday duty (on an unofficial basis) at St Luke's Hospital, where he became a friend of several of the medical staff, including Alexander John Sutherland. Sutherland was the owner of Blacklands House, a London private asylum for gentlemen. Blandford was from 1859 to 1863 resident medical officer at Blacklands House and then in 1863 resigned his appointment to go into private consulting practice.

He then obtained appointments as visiting physician to Blacklands House and its successor Newlands House, Tooting, to Otto House, Hammersmith, to Featherstone Hall, Southall, and to Clarence Lodge, Clapham Park. From 1874 to 1895 he was proprietor of Munster House, Fulham.

From 1865 to 1902 he was lecturer on psychological medicine at St George's Hospital. In 1869 he was elected FRCP. In 1877 he was president of the Medico-Psychological Association. In 1895 he gave the Lumleian Lectures on The Diagnosis, Prognosis, and Prophylaxis of Insanity.

His private practice, begun in 1863, was first in Clarges Street, then in Grosvenor Street, and finally at 48 Wimpole Street, and rapidly became large with an excellent reputation. In 1909 he retired from his London practice to live at Tunbridge Wells. He was a leading authority on legislation dealing with mental illness. His book Insanity and its Treatment maintained an international reputation for twenty years.

Blandford also wrote valuable articles on 'Insanity' in the second (1894) and third (1902) editions of 'Quain's Dictionary of Medicine'; 'Prevention of Insanity' and 'Prognosis of Insanity' in 'Tuke's Dictionary of Psychological Medicine' (1892); and 'Insanity ' in the 'Twentieth Century Practice of Medicine' (1897). He was a frequent contributor to the 'Journal of Mental Science,' to the first twenty-four volumes of which he prepared an index.

Blandford was athletic in early life, and belonged for several years to the 2nd (South) Middlesex volunteers. He was also interested in art, literature, and music, showing skill in water-colour sketching and collecting from an early period Whistler's etchings, besides contributing a few unsigned articles to the 'Cornhill Magazine.'

He was a member of the Athenaeum Club, London.

== Family ==
In 1864 in Amersham, Buckinghamshire, G. Fielding Blandford married Louisa Holloway. They had two sons and two daughters. The elder son, Walter Fielding Holloway Blandford (1864–1952), became a lecturer in entomology and then worked as a law clerk and solicitor. The younger son, Maurice Fielding Holloway Blandford (1866–1957), married Louisa Kathleen Robinson in 1899. The elder daughter, Violet Elsie Fielding Blandford, was born in 1873. The younger daughter, Katherine Fielding Blandford, was born in 1871. When he died in 1911, G. Fielding Blandford was survived by his widow and all four of his children.

== Selected publications ==
- Blandford, George Fielding (1871). Insanity and its treatment. Blandford, George Fielding (1884). 3rd edition. 4th edition. Oliver and Boyd. 1892.
- Fielding Blandford, G. (1891). "Address to the Students of St. George's Hospital, Oct. 1, 1891". The Lancet. 138 (3553): 751–754. doi:10.1016/s0140-6736(02)02329-2.
- Blandford, G. F. (4 August 1894). "An Address Delivered at the Opening of the Section of Psychology At the Annual Meeting of the British Medical Association, Held in Bristol, August, 1894". Br Med J. 2 (1753): 256–260. doi:10.1136/bmj.2.1753.256. PMC 2404710.
- "The Lumleian Lectures on The Diagnosis, Prognosis, and Prophylaxis of Insanity. Lecture I." The Lancet: 853–858. 6 April 1895.
- "The Lumleian Lectures on The Diagnosis, Prognosis, and Prophylaxis of Insanity. Lecture II". The Lancet: 911–916. 13 April 1895.
- "The Lumleian Lectures on The Diagnosis, Prognosis, and Prophylaxis of Insanity. Lecture III". The Lancet: 976–981. 20 April 1895.
- Blandford, G. F. (29 December 1900). "City Life in 1800". Br Med J. 2 (2087): 1834–1838. doi:10.1136/bmj.2.2087.1834. PMC 2464241. PMID 20759351.
