= James Hervey (physician) =

English physician

James Hervey FRCP (c. 1751 in London – 1824) was an English physician and pioneer of smallpox vaccination in London.

After education at a school at Northampton and then at home under a private tutor, James Hervey, at age 16, matriculated on 17 November 1767, at Queen's College, Oxford. He graduated there A.B. 1771, A.M. 1774, M.B. 1777, and M.D. 1781. Hervey was elected physician to Guy's Hospital in 1779, was admitted as a candidate of the Royal College of Physicians in 1781, and was elected F.R.C.P. in 1782. He regularly practised for some years at Tunbridge Wells during the summer season.

Hervey was Gulstonian lecturer in 1783, Harveian orator in 1785, and Lumleian lecturer from 1789 to 1811. He was the National Vaccine Establishment's first appointed registrar. He died in early 1824.

In 1812, Hervey reported for the Board of the National Vaccine Establishment that during the year 1811, the surgeons appointed by the Board's authority to nine stations in London vaccinated 3,148 people and distributed 23,794 effective doses of vaccine lymph to the public.
