= Malcolm Davenport Milne =

- Born: 22 May 1915; Woodley, Cheshire
- Died: 3 April 1991 (aged 75); Dacorum, Hertfordshire
- Occupation: Physician
- Known for: research on renal disease

Malcolm Davenport Milne FRCP FRS (1915–1991) was an English physician and nephrologist.

== Biography ==
After education at Stockport School, Milne matriculated at the University of Manchester, where he graduated BSc in 1936 and MB ChB (Manch.) in 1939. During WWII he was a regimental medical officer. From 1940 to 1946 he served in a field ambulance with the 8th Army in North Africa and then Italy. In 1943 for his service in Tunisia he was mentioned in dispatches.

After the war he returned to Manchester where, as lecturer in medicine, he collaborated with Douglas Black in experiments on potassium depletion, carried out on themselves.

He qualified MRCP in 1947 and graduated MD in 1951.

By the early 1950s Malcolm Milne's reputation as a physician and clinical scientist was growing fast, and in 1952 he was invited by Professor John McMichael to join his remarkable team at the Postgraduate Medical School.

From 1952 to 1961 Milne worked at the Royal Postgraduate Medical School.

There he was able to develop his interest in metabolic disorders and renal medicine and he published a series of important papers of which the most significant, in his own view, was that on the excretion of weak acids and bases.

In the 1950s and '60s journals were peppered with his contributions. One piece with which Milne was pleased was his clarification of the tyramine monoamine-oxidase inhibitor interaction (the “cheese reaction”). ... His substantial reputation would have been enhanced further if he could have had the then undescribed aldosterone assayed from a hypokalaemic, alkalotic, hypertensive woman. He postulated its presence but had no method to detect an excess of a sodium retaining hormone. The following year the same patient consulted a Dr Conn.

In 1961 Milne was appointed to the chair of medicine at the Westminster Hospital Medical School, where he retired in 1981. There he was a clinician and teacher and continued his research on metabolic disorders. He was an internationally recognized authority on disorders of amino-acid transport.

In 1941 in Stockport, Cheshire he married Mary Thorpe. They became the parents of a son and a daughter.

== Awards and honours ==
- 1958 — FRCP
- 1963 — Bradshaw Lecturer on Disorders of amino-acid transport
- 1976 — Lumleian Lecturer on Transport defects in disease
- 1978 — FRS
- 1981 — Baly Medal

== Selected publications ==
- Dent, R. V.; Milne, M. D.; Roussak, N. J.; Steiner, G. (1953). "Abdominal Topography in Osteoporosis of the Spine". British Medical Journal. 2 (4845): 1082–1084. doi:10.1136/bmj.2.4845.1082. PMC 2030027. PMID 13094122.
- Evans, B. M.; Milne, M. D. (1954). "Potassium-losing Nephritis Presenting as a Case of Periodic Paralysis". British Medical Journal. 2 (4896): 1067–1071. doi:10.1136/bmj.2.4896.1067. PMC 2079836. PMID 13199381.
- Milne, M. D. (1954). "The Classification and Prognosis of Nephritis and Allied Renal Diseases". Postgraduate Medical Journal. 30 (350): 640–654. doi:10.1136/pgmj.30.350.640. PMC 2501310. PMID 13215186.
- Fraenkel, G. J.; Truelove, S. C. (1955). "Haematemesis". British Medical Journal. 1 (4920): 999–1002. doi:10.1136/bmj.1.4920.999. PMC 2061684. PMID 14363771.
- Aird, I.; Milne, M. D.; Muehrcke, R. C. (1956). "Potassium-losing Nephritis". British Medical Journal. 1 (4974): 1042–1043. doi:10.1136/bmj.1.4974.1042. PMC 1979756.
- Crawford, M. A.; Milne, M. D.; Scribner, B. H. (1959). "The effects of changes in acid-base balance on urinary citrate in the rat". The Journal of Physiology. 149 (2): 413–423. doi:10.1113/jphysiol.1959.sp006348. PMC 1363098. PMID 13812721.
- Shackman, R.; Milne, M. D.; Struthers, N. W. (1960). "Oliguric Renal Failure of Surgical Origin". British Medical Journal. 2 (5211): 1473–1482. doi:10.1136/bmj.2.5211.1473. PMC 2097654. PMID 13750544.
- Milne, M. D.; Asatoor, A. M.; Edwards, K. D.; Loughridge, L. W. (1961). "The intestinal absorption defect in cystinuria". Gut. 2 (4): 323–337. doi:10.1136/gut.2.4.323. PMC 1413360. PMID 18668745.
- London, D. R.; Milne, M. D. (1962). "Dangers of Monoamine Oxidase Inhibitors". British Medical Journal. 2 (5321): 1752. doi:10.1136/bmj.2.5321.1752. PMC 1926946.
- Colliss, J. E.; Levi, A. J.; Milne, M. D. (1963). "Stature and Nutrition in Cystinuria and Hartnup Disease". British Medical Journal. 1 (5330): 590–592. doi:10.1136/bmj.1.5330.590. PMC 2123508. PMID 14022394.
- Asatoor, A. M.; London, D. R.; Milne, M. D.; Simenhoff, M. L. (1963). "The excretion of pethidine and its derivatives". British Journal of Pharmacology and Chemotherapy. 20 (2): 285–298. doi:10.1111/j.1476-5381.1963.tb01468.x. PMC 1703639. PMID 13965101.
- Milne, M. D. (1964). "Disorders of Amino-Acid Transport". British Medical Journal. 1 (5379): 327–336. doi:10.1136/bmj.1.5379.327. PMC 1812644. PMID 14079031.
- Milne, M. D. (1964). "New Approaches to Poisoning". Proceedings of the Royal Society of Medicine. 57 (9): 809–811. doi:10.1177/003591576405700918. PMC 1898761. PMID 14208024.
- Milne, M. D. (1964). "Recognition, Management and Prognosis of Urinary Infections". Proceedings of the Royal Society of Medicine. 57 (12): 1122–1124. doi:10.1177/003591576405701203. PMC 1898224. PMID 14244886.
- Asatoor, A. M.; Galman, B. R.; Johnson, J. R.; Milne, M. D. (1965). "The excretion of dexamphetamine and its derivatives". British Journal of Pharmacology and Chemotherapy. 24 (1): 293–300. doi:10.1111/j.1476-5381.1965.tb02105.x. PMC 1704066. PMID 14302363.
- Milne, M. D. (1965). "Influence of Acid-base Balance on Efficacy and Toxicity of Drugs". Proceedings of the Royal Society of Medicine. 58 (11 Pt 2): 961–963. doi:10.1177/003591576505811P204. PMC 1898658. PMID 5854429.
- Bourke, E.; Milne, M. D.; Stokes, G. S. (1966). "Caecal pH and ammonia in experimental uraemia". Gut. 7 (5): 558–561. doi:10.1136/gut.7.5.558. PMC 1552491. PMID 5929271.
- Milne, M. D. (1966). "Lessons from Inborn Errors of Metabolism". Proceedings of the Royal Society of Medicine. 59 (11 Pt 1): 1157–1162. doi:10.1177/003591576605911P136. PMC 1901325. PMID 5333528.
- Milne, M. D. (1967). "Recent Developments in the Management and Prognosis of some Inborn Errors of Metabolism". Proceedings of the Royal Society of Medicine. 60 (11 Pt 1): 1149–1152. doi:10.1177/003591576706011P139. PMC 1902126. PMID 6060714.
- Milne, M. D. (1968). "Hypertension Secondary to Renal Disease". British Medical Journal. 4 (5624): 172–173. doi:10.1136/bmj.4.5624.172-b. PMC 1911972.
- Milne, M. D. (1969). "Is the teaching ward round obsolete?". Proceedings of the Royal Society of Medicine. 62 (8): 846–848. doi:10.1177/003591576906200842. PMC 1811193. PMID 5810316.
- Asatoor, A. M.; Bandoh, J. K.; Lant, A. F.; Milne, M. D.; Navab, F. (1970). "Intestinal absorption of carnosine and its constituent amino acids in man". Gut. 11 (3): 250–254. doi:10.1136/gut.11.3.250. PMC 1411426. PMID 5423906.
- Asatoor, A. M.; Cheng, B.; Edwards, K. D.; Lant, A. F.; Matthews, D. M.; Milne, M. D.; Navab, F.; Richards, A. J. (1970). "Intestinal absorption of two dipeptides in Hartnup disease". Gut. 11 (5): 380–387. doi:10.1136/gut.11.5.380. PMC 1411553. PMID 5428040.
- Milne, M. D. (1971). "Disorders of intestinal amino-acid transport". Journal of Clinical Pathology. Supplement (Royal College of Pathologists). 5: 41–44. doi:10.1136/jcp.s3-5.1.41. PMC 1176258.
- Milne, M. D. (1971). "Amino acid metabolism in cystinuria". Biochemical Journal. 122 (1): 9P–10P. doi:10.1042/bj1220009pb. PMC 1176707. PMID 5124822.
- Asatoor, A. M.; Harrison, B. D.; Milne, M. D.; Prosser, D. I. (1972). "Intestinal absorption of an arginine-containing peptide in cystinuria". Gut. 13 (2): 95–98. doi:10.1136/gut.13.2.95. PMC 1412066. PMID 5045711.
- Asatoor, A. M.; Freedman, P. S.; Gabriel, J. R.; Milne, M. D.; Prosser, D. I.; Roberts, J. T.; Willoughby, C. P. (1974). "Amino acid imbalance in cystinuria". Journal of Clinical Pathology. 27 (6): 500–504. doi:10.1136/jcp.27.6.500. PMC 478164. PMID 4411931.
- Asatoor, A. M.; Milne, M. D.; Walshe, J. M. (1983). "The Effect of Chelation Therapy on the Amino Aciduria and Peptiduria of Wilson's Disease". Journal of the Royal College of Physicians of London. 17 (2): 122–125. doi:10.1016/S0035-8819(25)02646-7. PMC 5370932. PMID 6842414.
- Milne, M. D. (1983). "Acute Renal Failure". Journal of the Royal Society of Medicine. 76 (3): 237–238. doi:10.1177/014107688307600329. PMC 1438707.
