= Pathological Society of London =

The Pathological Society of London was founded in 1846 for the "cultivation and promotion of pathology by the exhibition and description of specimens, drawings, microscopic preparations, casts or models of morbid parts."

Its first meeting was held in February 1847 at which C. J. B. Williams was elected as the society's first president and 106 members enrolled. Early members included Richard Bright, Golding Bird, William Gull, William Jenner, Henry Bence Jones and Richard Quain.

The society published 58 volumes of the Transactions of the Pathological Society of London.

In 1907 it was merged with the Royal Medical and Chirurgical Society of London and other societies to become the Royal Society of Medicine.

== Presidents ==
- 1906–1907 Philip Henry Pye-Smith (last President)
- 1902–1906 John Burdon Sanderson
- 1899–1902 Sir William Watson Cheyne
- 1897–1899 Joseph Frank Payne
- 1895–1897 Henry Trentham Butlin
- 1893–1895 Frederick William Pavy
- 1891–1893 George Murray Humphry
- 1889–1891 William Howship Dickinson
- 1887–1889 Sir James Paget
- 1885–1887 John Syer Bristowe
- 1883–1885 John Hulke
- 1881–1883 Samuel Wilks
- 1879–1880 Jonathan Hutchinson
- 1877–1879 Charles Murchison
- 1875–1877 George D. Pollock
- 1873–1875 Sir William Jenner
- 1871–1873 John Hilton
- 1869–1871 Sir Richard Quain, 1st Baronet
- 1867–1869 Sir John Simon
- 1865–1867 Thomas Bevill Peacock
- 1863–1865 Sir Prescott Gardner Hewett
- 1861–1863 James Copland
- 1859–1861 Sir William Fergusson
- 1857–1859 Sir Thomas Watson, 1st Baronet
- 1855–1857 James Moncrieff Arnott
- 1853–1855 Benjamin Guy Babington
- 1852–1853 Caesar Henry Hawkins
- 1850–1852 Peter Mere Latham
- 1848–1850 Charles Aston Key
- 1846-1848 Charles James Blasius Williams (first President)
