= Charles Murchison (physician) =

British physician (1830–1879)

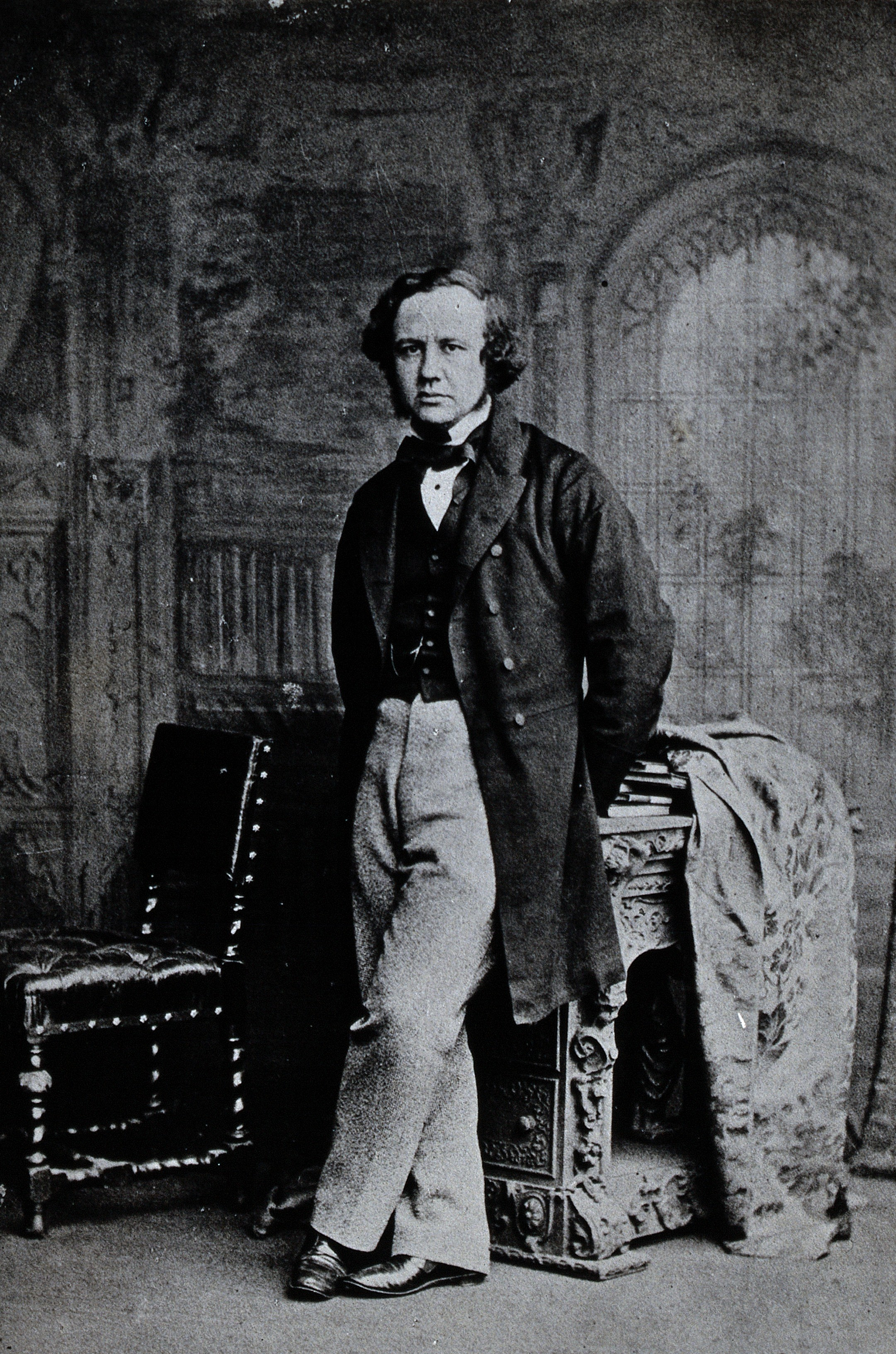

Charles Murchison (26 July 1830 – 23 April 1879) was a British physician and a noted authority on fevers and diseases of the liver.

== Early life ==
Murchison was born in Jamaica on 26 July 1830. He was a younger son of Alexander Murchison, M.D., cousin of Sir Roderick Impey Murchison. When Murchison was three years old, the family returned to Scotland and settled at Elgin, where he received his first education. At the age of fifteen, he entered the University of Aberdeen to study arts; two years later, he began studying medicine in the University of Edinburgh. There he distinguished himself in a range of subjects, obtaining a large number of medals and prizes. He especially excelled in surgery, and in 1850 he passed the examination of the College of Surgeons of Edinburgh when little over twenty years of age. In the same year he became house surgeon to James Syme. In 1851 he graduated M.D. with a dissertation on the "Pathology of tumours", based on his own experience, for which he was awarded a gold medal. He then spent a short time as physician to the British embassy at Turin, and, returning to Edinburgh, was for a short time resident physician in the Royal Infirmary.

== Career ==
After further study in Dublin and Paris, Murchison entered the Bengal Army of the East India Company on 17 January 1853. On reaching India he was almost immediately made professor of chemistry at the Medical College, Calcutta. Later on, he served with the expedition to Burma in 1854, and his experience there furnished the materials for two papers in the Edinburgh Medical Journal for January and April 1855 on the "Climate and Diseases of Burmah".

In October 1855, Murchison left the service and settled in London as a physician, commencing the long series of his medical appointments by becoming physician to the Westminster General Dispensary. Shortly afterwards he was connected with St. Mary's Hospital as lecturer on botany and as curator of the museum, of which he prepared in a remarkably short time an excellent catalogue. In 1856 he was appointed assistant physician to King's College Hospital but had to resign in 1860. Murchison had no difficulty in obtaining a similar position (combined with that of lecturer on pathology) at the Middlesex Hospital in the same year and, being promoted to the post of full physician in 1866, retained his connection with that hospital until 1871. He also acted as assistant physician to the London Fever Hospital from 1856 and was promoted to be physician in 1861, an appointment which gave a definite bias to his medical researches. On his retirement in 1870, a testimonial was presented to him by public subscription. His only court appointment was that of physician to the Duke and Duchess of Connaught. Murchison's own consulting practice was based at first on his special knowledge of fevers, but it extended to other branches of medicine.

In 1871, when St. Thomas's Hospital was being enlarged, Murchison accepted the posts of physician and lecturer on medicine, which he held until his death. In the autumn of 1873 he traced the origin of an epidemic of typhoid fever to a polluted milk supply, and the residents in West London presented him with a testimonial.

In 1866 he was elected a Fellow of the Royal Society. He became a member of the Royal College of Physicians in 1855, was elected fellow in 1859, and gave their Croonian Lectures in 1874. In 1870 he received the honorary degree of LL.D from the University of Edinburgh. In 1875, he was examiner in medicine to the University of London. In 1877 he was elected to serve for two years as President of the Pathological Society of London.

== Family life and legacy ==
In July 1859 Murchison married Clara Elizabeth, third daughter of Robert Bickersteth, a Liverpool surgeon. They had nine children.

In the morning of 23 April 1879, while seeing patients in his consulting room, he died suddenly of heart disease affecting the aortic valves. He had suffered from the ailment for nine years but had resolutely declined the advice of medical friends to retire from practice. He was buried in Norwood Cemetery. His wife, two sons and four daughters survived him.

In his memory, the Charles Murchison Scholarship in Clinical Medicine was established. It was awarded in alternate years in London by the Royal College of Physicians, and in Edinburgh by the university. A marble portrait bust was also placed in St. Thomas's Hospital.

His herbarium is at Edinburgh and his Indian botanical specimens are at Kew.

== Published works ==
Murchison's most important contribution to medical science was "A Treatise on the Continued Fevers of Great Britain" (1862). A German translation by W. Zuelzer was published in Brunswick in 1867, and a French translation of one part by Lutaud in Paris in 1878. This work became at once a standard authority. He treated the same subject in the Annual Reports of the London Fever Hospital (1861–9) and in medical journals.

Another subject to which he gave special attention was that of diseases of the liver. After translating Frerichs's work on that subject for the New Sydenham Society in 1861, he published Clinical Lectures on Diseases of the Liver, Jaundice, and Abdominal Dropsy (1868). In 1874 he took as the subject of his Croonian Lectures at the Royal College of Physicians "Functional Derangements of the Liver"; a French translation by Jules Cyr appeared in Paris in 1878.

His regard for the memory of his friend, Dr. Hugh Falconer, induced him to take great pains in bringing out the latter's Palæontological Memoirs in 1868; geology was a favourite pursuit with Murchison.

Murchison took an active part in scientific societies, more especially the Pathological Society of London, of which he became a member in 1855, was secretary 1865–8, treasurer 1869–76, and president 1877–81. To the Transactions of the society he contributed in all 143 papers and reports, some of them of considerable importance. He was also a member of the Royal Medical and Chirurgical Society, the Clinical Society of London, and the London Epidemiological Society, and contributed, though less frequently, to their transactions.

Murchison also contributed to the Edinburgh Medical Journal, the British and Foreign Medico-Chirurgical Review, Beale's Archives of Medicine, St. Thomas's Hospital Reports, the British Medical Journal, and other medical papers. The total number of his published works, memoirs, lectures, and so on, was, according to a list in his own handwriting, 311.
