= George Callender =

George Callender may refer to:

- George Russell Callender (1884–1973), American physician and army officer
- George William Callender (1830–1878), English surgeon
