= London Chest Hospital =

- Barts Health NHS Trust
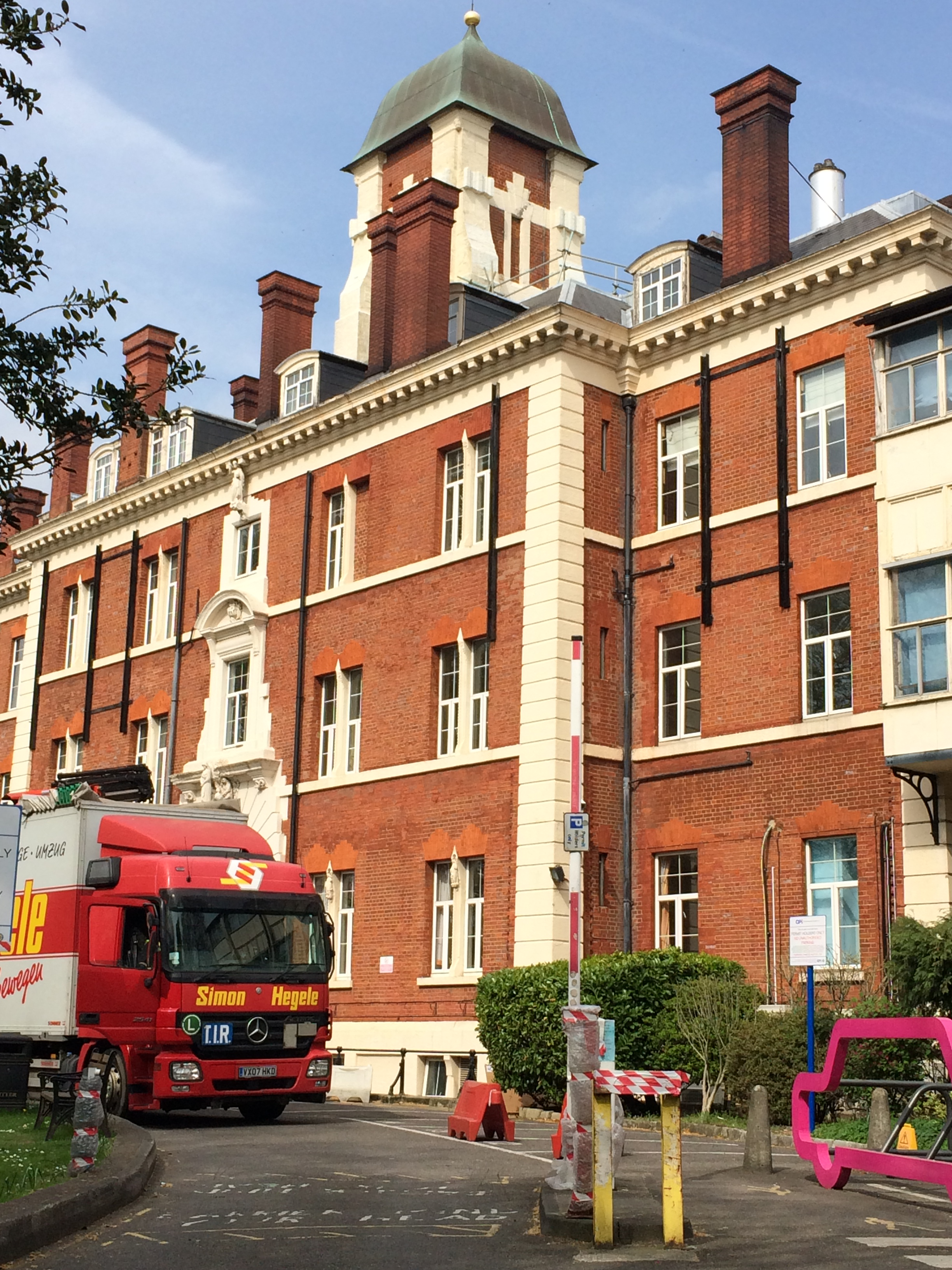
- The London Chest Hospital on the day of closure

- Location within Tower Hamlets

Geography
- Location: Bonner Road, Bethnal Green, London, England
- Coordinates: 51.5321°N 0.04926°W

Organisation
- Care system: National Health Service
- Type: Specialist

Services
- Speciality: Chest

History
- Founded: 13 March 1848; 178 years ago
- Closed: 17 April 2015; 11 years ago

The London Chest Hospital, located in Bethnal Green in London, adjacent to Victoria Park, was a hospital with a national reputation for treatment of cardiac and pulmonary disease. Since 1999 it had been run by the Barts Health NHS Trust. It closed on 17 April 2015 as part of the creation of the Barts Heart Centre at St Bartholomew's Hospital, by consolidation of services from the London Chest Hospital and The Heart Hospital, part of University College London Hospital.

== History ==
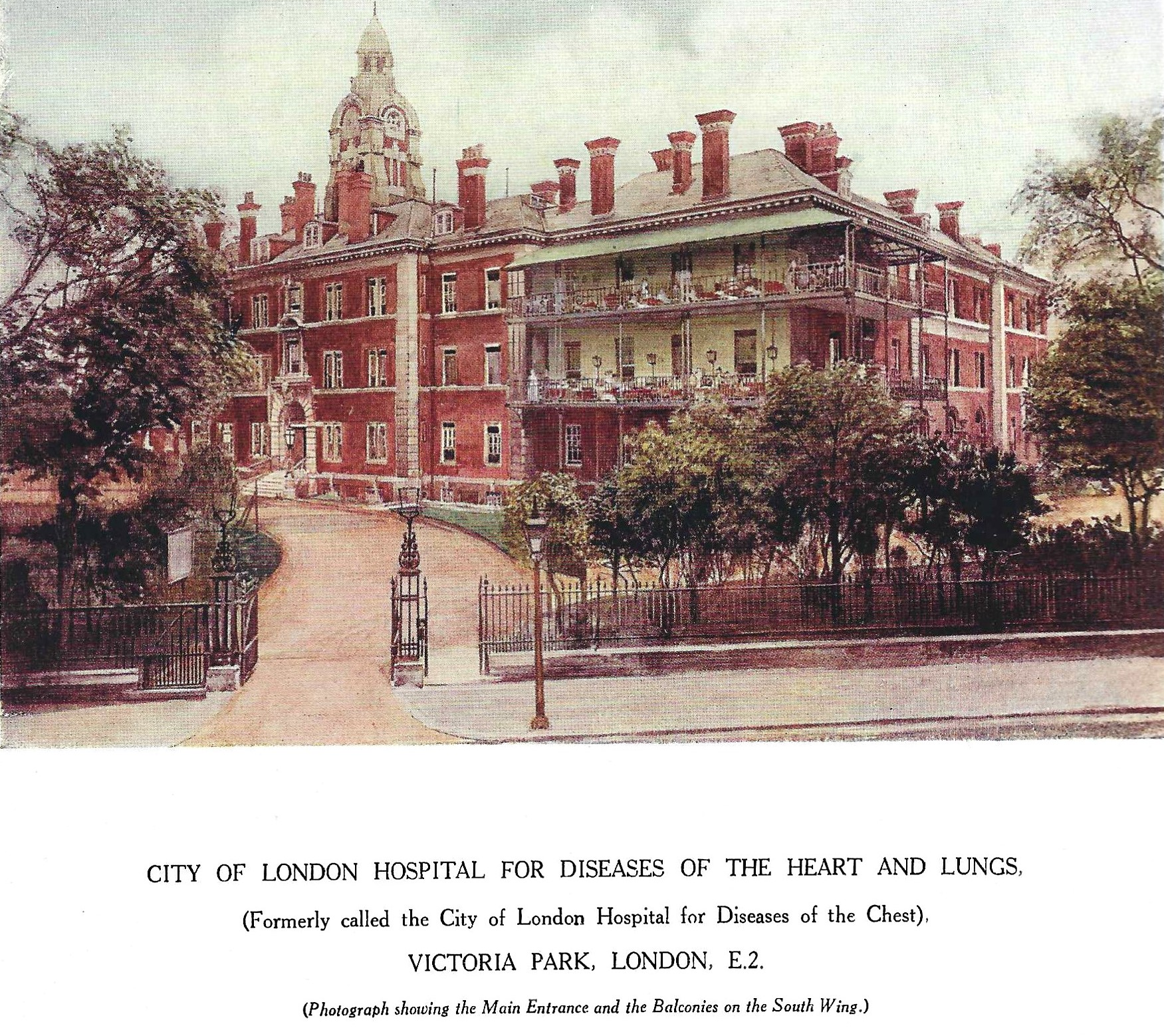
The City of London Hospital for Diseases of the Heart and Lungs circa 1924

The London Chest Hospital was founded on 13 March 1848 by a group of men, predominantly Quakers, who included bankers, merchants and the physician, Thomas Bevill Peacock. They wished to build a hospital to deal with diseases of the heart and lungs, particularly tuberculosis. By June the group, with the patronage of Queen Victoria and Prince Albert, had raised enough money to open a public dispensary at 6 Liverpool Street, while the hospital was being built. In 1849 the site of the former Bishop's Hall, the Manor House of Stepney, was purchased and in 1851 Prince Albert laid the foundation stone. The architect was F. W. Ordish. The hospital opened in 1855 at a cost of around £30,000. Notable among the matrons of the hospital was Miss Lillian Grace Dalton (matron 1912–1922). During the First World War she was appointed Matron in the Territorial Force Nursing Service for the 4th London General Hospital and was awarded the Royal Red Cross for her services in civilian nursing services.

Until 1923, it was known as the City of London Hospital for Diseases of the Chest, then it was renamed the City of London Hospital for Diseases of the Heart and Lungs, although it was popularly known as the 'Victoria Park Hospital'. A Pathological Laboratory & Research Institute was opened in 1927 funded by the Prudential Assurance Company. In 1937 a new Surgical Wing was added to the hospital and the name was changed to the London Chest Hospital. The hospital was badly damaged by bombing during the Second World War and in 1948 it became part of the National Health Service. In 1994 it became part of the Royal Hospitals NHS Trust together with the Royal London Hospital and St Bartholomew's Hospital.

On 17 April 2015 it closed due to a reconfiguration of specialist cardiovascular services in north and east London. This enabled the creation of the Barts Heart Centre, one of Europe's largest cardiac centres. Local campaigners opposed the closure which was approved by NHS England in October 2014. Barts Health announced in April 2015 that 'the hospital is no longer up to the demands of rigorous specialised 21st century medicine and is now closed.' Services moved from the London Chest Hospital (Barts Health) and The Heart Hospital (UCLH) to the Barts Heart Centre at St Bartholomew's Hospital in April and May 2015. On 28 August 2015, Barts Health NHS Trust sold the premises to Circle Housing with the proceeds reinvested into the Barts Heart Centre.

== Notable staff ==
- James Risdon Bennett, physician at the hospital from 1849 and president of the Royal College of Physicians 1876–1880
- Joseph Lister, consulting surgeon at the hospital 1896–1905 and pioneer of antiseptic surgery
- Thomas Bevill Peacock, physician at the hospital 1848–1882 and founding member of the Pathological Society
- Hannah Gearing Hetherington (1850–1922), trained at The Westminster Hospital and worked at The London Hospital under Eva Luckes between 1882 and 1885. Hetherington was matron 1885–1896.
- Lillian Grace Dalton (matron 1912–1922).

== Famous patients ==
Fabrice Muamba, the Congolese-born footballer who played for England's Bolton Wanderers, was taken to the London Chest Hospital after suffering a cardiac arrest on the pitch on 17 March 2012. He recovered, but was forced to retire from football.

== See also ==
- Healthcare in London
- List of hospitals in England
