= Frederick William Pavy =

British physician

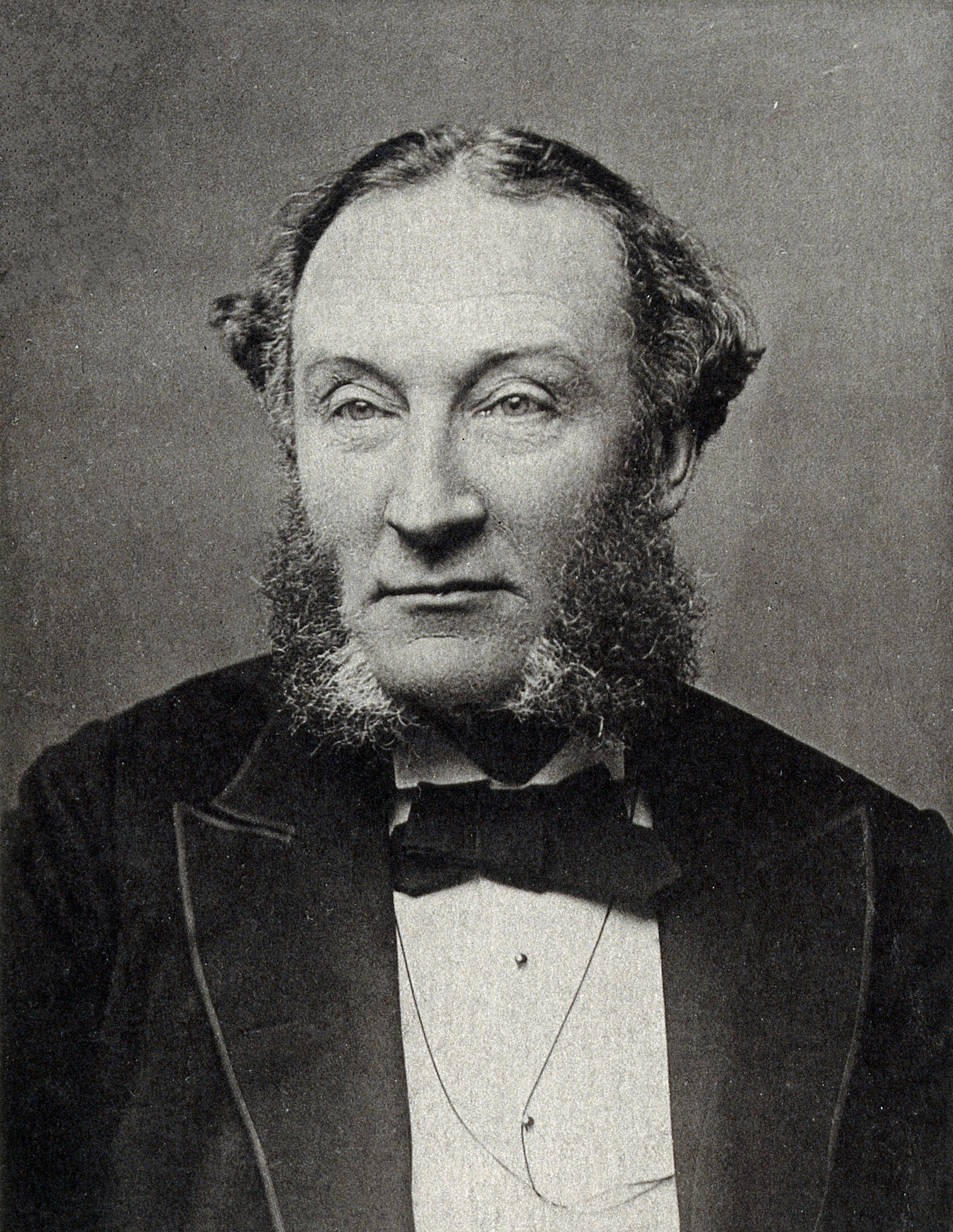
- Born: 29 May 1829; Wroughton
- Died: 19 September 1911 (aged 82); London
- Occupations: Physician, physiologist

Frederick William Pavy (29 May 1829 – 19 September 1911) was a British physician, physiologist, and the discoverer of the Pavy disease, a cyclic or recurrent physiologic albuminuria.

== Life ==
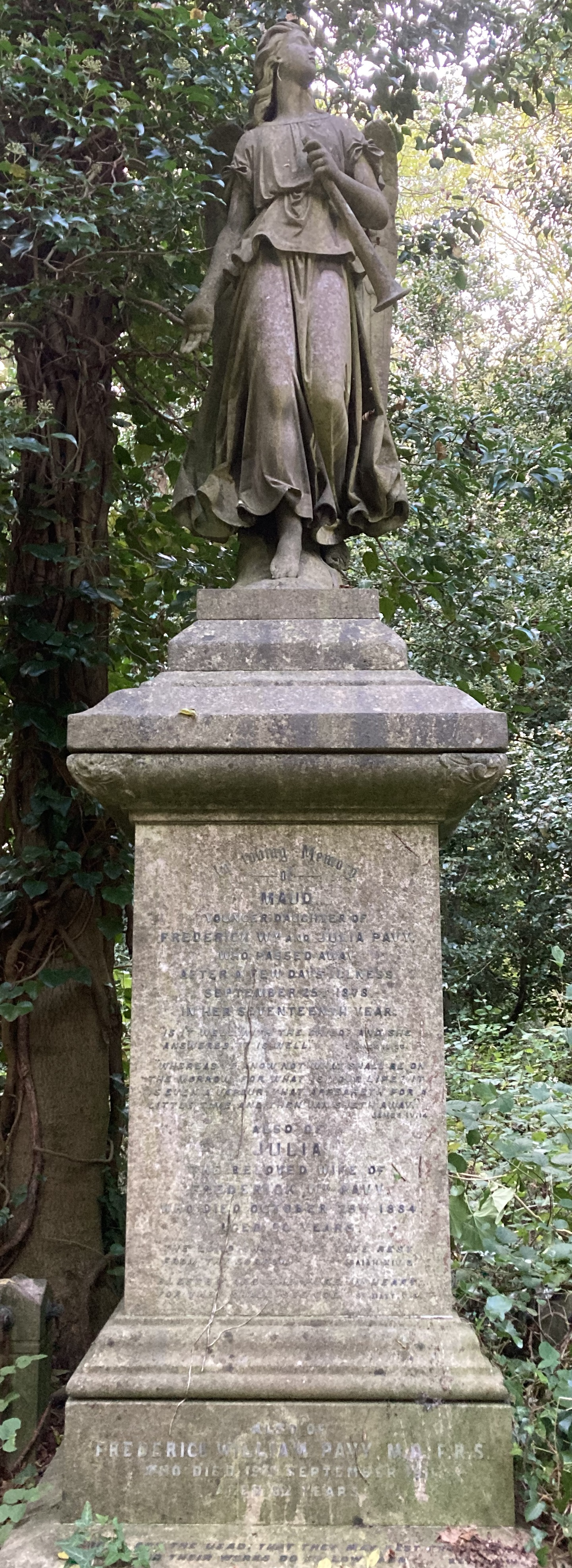
Family vault of Frederick William Pavy in Highgate Cemetery

Pavy was born in Wroughton and educated at Merchant Taylors' School. He entered Guy's Hospital in 1847 and worked with Richard Bright in the study of Bright's disease or kidney failure. He graduated as M.B. after five years from the University of London and M.D. the following year, then became Lecturer of Anatomy at Guy's in 1854 and of Physiology in 1856. In 1859, he was appointed Assistant Physician at Guy's and full Physician in 1871.

He was made President of the Pathological Society of London in 1893 and President of the Medical and Chirurgical Society of London in 1900. He delivered the Goulstonian Lectures in 1862 and the Croonian Lecture in 1878 and 1894 to the Royal College of Physicians. He was elected a Fellow of the Royal Society in 1863.

He had married Julia Oliver in London in 1855. They had two daughters, Florence Julia (1856–1902) and Maud (born 1862, predeceased her mother). Florence Pavy married Rev. Sir Borradaile Savory in 1881.

Pavy died on 19 September 1911 and was buried in a family vault on the western side of Highgate Cemetery.

== Diabetes ==
Pavy was a leading expert in diabetes, and spent almost 20 years trying to disprove Claude Bernard's theory of the glycogen-glucose metabolic cycle. His 1862 paper "Researches on the Nature and Treatment of Diabetes" was, for many years, the definitive guide to the condition.

Pavy studied carbohydrate metabolism and dietetic treatment for diabetes. In 1873, Pavy authored A Treatise on Food and Dietetics, which recommended almonds and nuts as bread substitutes, and promoted a low-carbohydrate diet to treat diabetes. His diet allowed all kinds of butcher's meat (except liver), cheese, eggs, fish and some green vegetables. All sugar was forbidden, including all kinds of fruit, pasta, and potatoes but he allowed spirits and wines that had not been sweetened.

== Selected publications ==
- A Treatise on the Function of Digestion (1869)
- Researches on the Nature and Treatment of Diabetes (1869)
- A Treatise on Food and Dietetics (1874)
- The Physiology of the Carbohydrates (1894)
- On Carbohydrate Metabolism (1906)

== See also ==
- List of honorary medical staff at King Edward VII's Hospital for Officers
