= T. C. Hope =

Name T. C. Hope may refer to:-

- Thomas Charles Hope - a Scottish physician and chemist.
- Theodore Cracraft Hope - a British born civil servant of the Government of India and also author of many books.
