= Charles Murchison =

Charles Murchison may refer to:

- Sir Charles Murchison (politician) (1872–1952), British Conservative Party politician
- Charles Murchison (physician) (1830–1879), British physician
