= James Hope (physician) =

English physician (1801–1841)

James Hope (1801–1841) was an English physician. He has been called "the first cardiologist in the modern sense". He is known for discovering the early diastolic murmur of mitral stenosis in 1829.

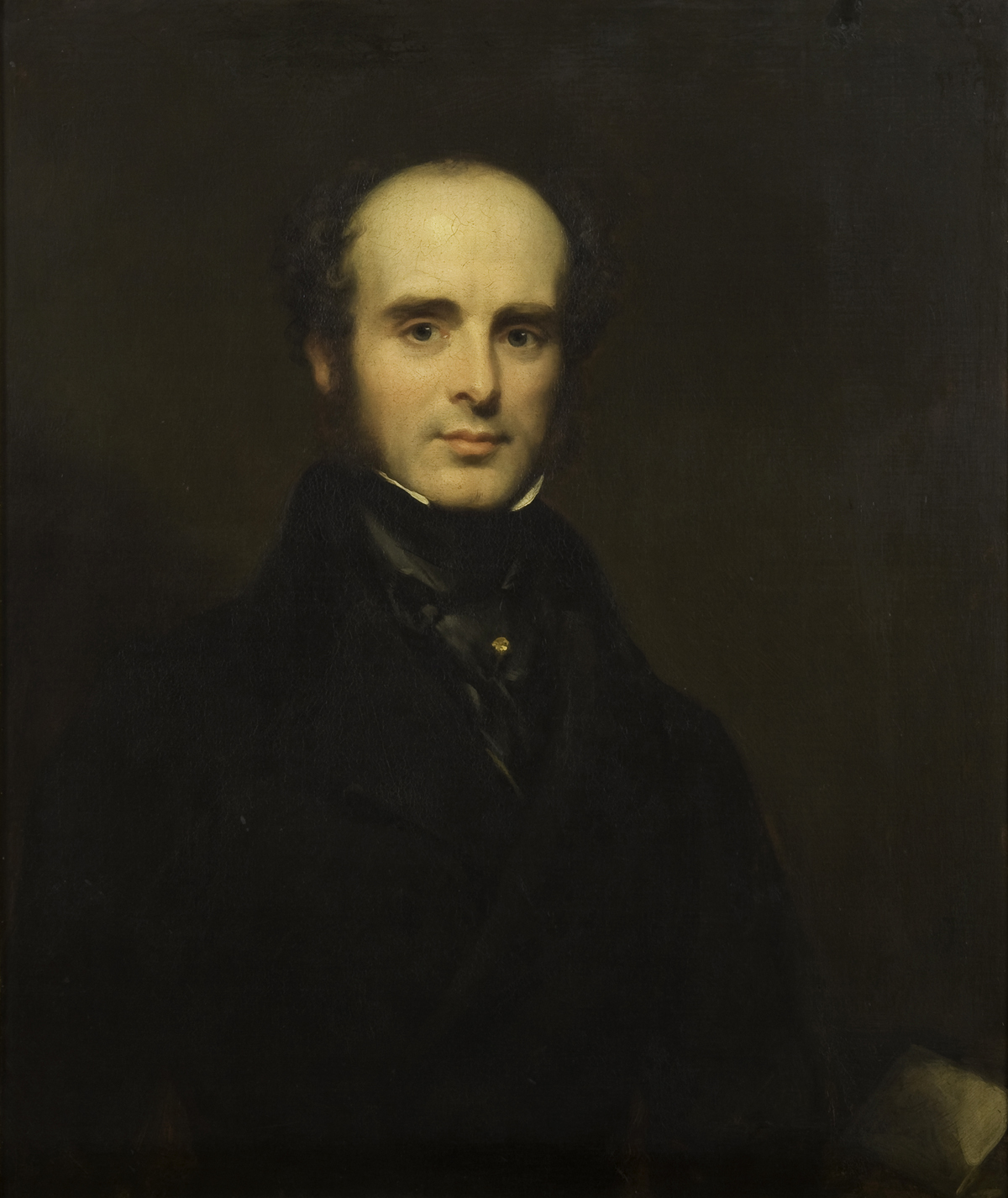
Thomas Phillips, James Hope, 1841, Royal College of Physicians

== Life ==
He was born at Stockport in Cheshire 23 February 1801, the son of Thomas Hope, merchant and manufacturer, of Prestbury Hall near Macclesfield. After four years (1815–18) at Macclesfield grammar school, James resided for about 18 months at Oxford, where his elder brother was then an undergraduate, but never became a member of the university.

In October 1820, Hope went as a medical student to Edinburgh University, where he studied for five years. The subject of his inaugural medical dissertation (August 1825) was aneurysm of the aorta, and he then began a collection of drawings of pathological specimens coming under his notice. A president of the Royal Medical Society of Edinburgh, he held the posts of house-physician and house-surgeon at the Edinburgh Royal Infirmary.

Leaving Edinburgh in December 1825, Hope became a medical student at St. Bartholomew's Hospital, London, and in the spring of 1826 obtained the diploma of the Royal College of Surgeons. That summer he left England for the continent, and stayed a year at Paris as one of the clinical clerks of Auguste François Chomel at the Hôpital de la Charité. He then visited Switzerland, Italy, Germany, and the Netherlands, and returned England in June 1828. In September he became a licentiate the Royal College of Physicians.

Hope went into medical practice in December 1828 in Lower Seymour Street, Portman Square, London, and entered himself as a pupil at St. George's Hospital, where he was one of the early champions of auscultation. "He described a soft early diastolic murmur due to mitral stenosis and was the first to distinguish it from the diastolic murmur of aortic reflux. It was once called Hope's murmur." In 1829 he established a private dispensary linked to the Portman Square and Harley Street district visiting societies. In 1831 he was elected physician to the Marylebone Infirmary, where he had charge of ninety beds. In the autumn of 1832 he delivered at his own home a course of lectures, intended for practitioners only, on diseases of the chest. He afterwards lectured at St. George's Hospital, where he was elected assistant physician in 1834, and at the Aldersgate Street School of Medicine.

Hope's investigations into the causes of heart sounds involved vivisection. A series of his experiments led in February 1835 to controversy with Charles James Blasius Williams. In July 1839, on the resignation of William Frederick Chambers, he was appointed full physician at St. George's Hospital, after some opposition from Williams. He then suffered spitting of blood, and his health began to decline. In July 1840 he was elected a fellow of the College of Physicians.

He was elected a fellow of the Royal Society in June 1832, and was a corresponding member of several foreign societies. When he retired, his professional income was £4,000 per year. He was a member of the Church of England, and had strong religious convictions.

Towards the end of 1840 Hope had to give up most duties, but he continued to see a few patients till he moved in March 1841 to Hampstead, where he died on 12 May of pulmonary consumption and was buried on the western side of Highgate Cemetery.

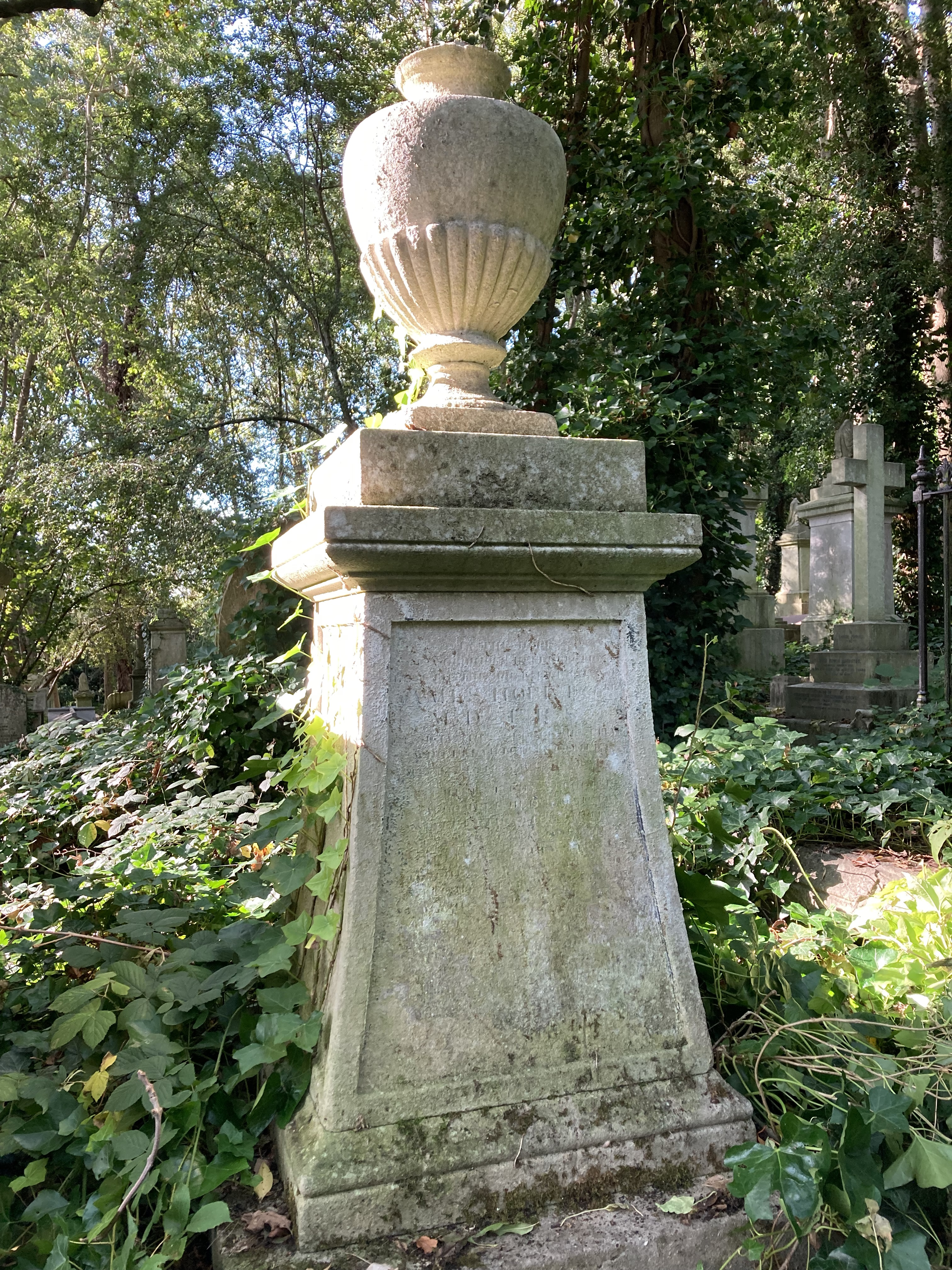
Grave of James Hope in Highgate Cemetery

== Works ==
In 1829 Hope began to publish a series of papers, building up to a projected work on the heart. Four papers on Aneurysms of the Aorta, based on Observations as House Physician and House Surgeon to the Royal Infirmary, Edinburgh, appeared in the London Medical Gazette, 1829, and in 1830 he sent to the same journal four papers relating especially to the sounds of the heart and the physiology of its action. He also wrote for the Cyclopædia of Practical Medicine about the same time the articles "Aorta, Aneurysm of", "Arteritis", "Dilatation of the Heart", "Heart, Diseases of", "Heart, Degeneration of", "Heart, Hypertrophy of", "Palpitation", "Pericarditis and Carditis", and "Valves of the Heart, Diseases of"; these were not published till 1833–1835.

Hope's major work came out at the end of 1831 (dated 1832) with the title A Treatise on the Diseases of the Heart and Great Vessels; comprising a new view of the Physiology of the Heart's Action, according to which the physical signs are explained. The book was well received internationally, and it was translated into German by an old Edinburgh friend, Ferdinand Wilhelm Becker. A third edition appeared in 1839, corrected and enlarged, and with the addition of plates; and a fourth edition in 1849, after his death, with additions and corrections, but without the plates, and in a cheaper form. Hope's conclusions about the sounds of the heart became widely accepted. His usage of the term "myosclerosis" was, however, unclear.

Hope also based a work about morbid anatomy on his own drawings. The first part appeared at the beginning of 1833, and the last at the end of the following year. With articles in medical periodicals, he contributed the article on Inflammation of the Brain to Alexander Tweedie's Library of Medicine. Notes on the Treatment of Chronic Pleurisy was finished days before his death (Medico-Chirurgical Review, vol. xxxv. 1841).

== Family ==
Hope married Anne Fulton on 10 March 1831. They had one child, Theodore Hope.
