= George David Pollock =

British surgeon

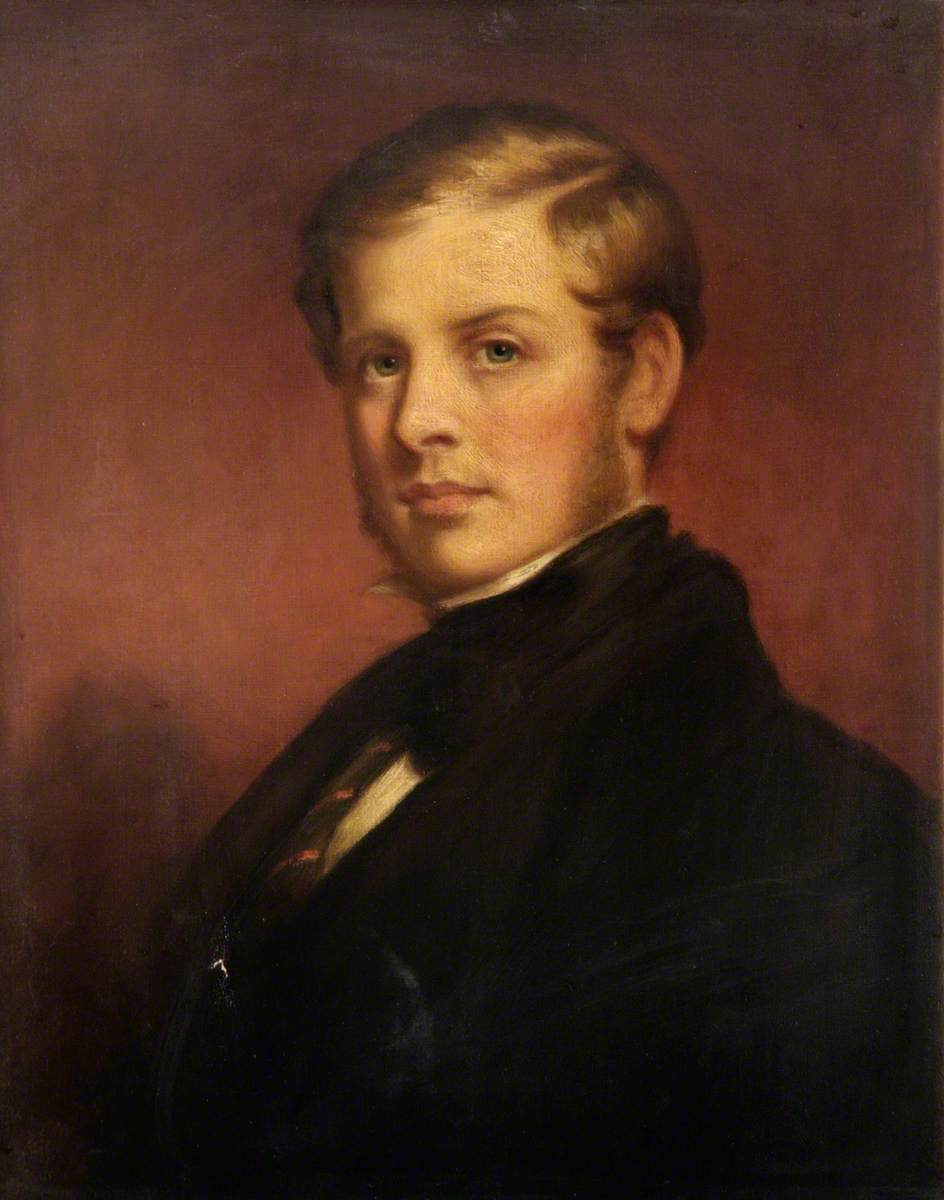
Image of George David Pollock

George David Pollock FRCS (1817 – 14 February 1897) was a British surgeon, known as a pioneer of skin grafts.

== Biography ==
Born in India as the second son of the British officer George Pollock, George David Pollock was sent to England for his early education and then apprenticed to a rural physician. He received medical education at St George's Hospital and was made M.R.C.S. in 1840. After serving at St George's Hospital as House Surgeon to Sir Benjamin Brodie, Pollock went to Canada in 1843 to serve in the post of Resident Physician to the Governor-General of Canada, Lord Metcalfe, who had cancer. In 1845 Lord Metcalfe, accompanied by Pollock, returned to England. After Lord Metcalfe died in 1846, Pollock became Assistant Surgeon at St George's Hospital and, with several promotions, served there until his retirement in 1880. Upon the retirement of Thomas Tatum in 1867, Pollock became the surgeon in charge of ophthalmic cases and operated for cataracts. Also at St George's Hospital he was Demonstrator of Anatomy under Prescott Hewett and succeeded him as lecturer on Anatomy. At the Hospital for Sick Children in Great Ormond Street, Pollock had an appointment as a Surgeon and performed cleft-palate operations.

He contributed the articles "Injuries of the Abdomen", "Diseases of the Mouth, Pharynx and Oesophagus", and "Diseases of the Intestines" in Holmes and Hulke's A System of Surgery: Theoretical and Practical, 3rd ed, 1883.

In 1846 Pollock was made F.R.C.S. He was President of the Pathological Society in 1875–1877 and President of the Royal Medical and Chirurgical Society for the years 1886 and 1887.

He married in 1850 and upon his death in 1897 was survived by his widow and three of his five children.

== The Pollock graft ==
In 1869 Jacques-Louis Reverdin developed a successful method for the allograft of human skin. Based upon Reverdin's work, Pollock in May 1870 performed the first such successful operation in the United Kingdom. Many British surgeons adopted the technique and for many years what was called the "Reverdin graft" or the "pinch graft" outside the UK was called the "Pollock graft" in the UK.
