= Thomas Bevill Peacock =

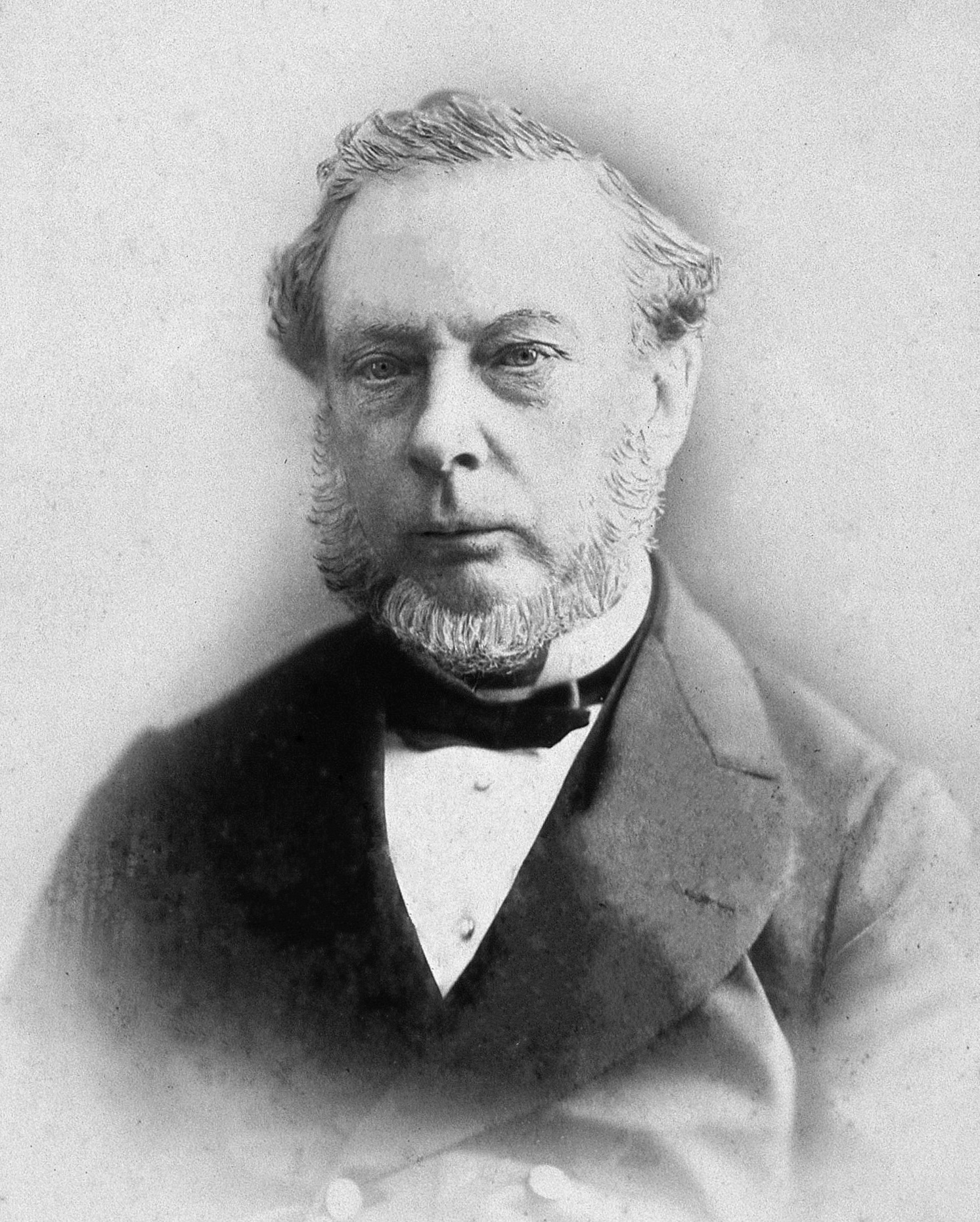
Thomas Bevill Peacock

Thomas Bevill Peacock (21 December 1812 – 31 May 1882) was a cardiologist in London remembered for founding the London Chest Hospital. He also greatly contributed to the understanding of aortic dissection by publishing several case series on the condition.

== Life ==
Peacock was the son of Thomas Peacock and his wife Sarah Bevill, who belonged to the Society of Friends; he was born at York on 21 December 1812. At the age of nine, he was sent to the boarding school of Samuel Marshall at Kendal. He was then apprenticed to John Fothergill, a medical practitioner at Darlington.

In 1833, Peacock went to London as a medical student at University College, also attending the surgical practice of St George's Hospital. In 1835, he became a member of the College of Surgeons and a licentiate of the Society of Apothecaries. He then traveled for his health, twice visiting Ceylon and studying in Paris. He spent 1838 as house-surgeon to the hospital at Chester, and in 1841 went to the University of Edinburgh Medical School, where in 1842 he took the degree of M.D. In 1843, he was the first to describe the link between eclampsia and the presence of protein in the urine.

In 1844, Peacock was admitted a licentiate of the Royal College of Physicians of London, and in 1849 was elected assistant physician to St. Thomas's Hospital. In 1850, he was elected a fellow of the College of Physicians, and in 1865 delivered the Croonian lectures there on Some of the Causes and Effects of Valvular Disease of the Heart. A dispensary that he began in Liverpool Street, London, ultimately grew into the Victoria Park Hospital for diseases of the chest, to which he was a physician from its foundation. He lectured at St. Thomas's Hospital and was one of the founders of the Pathological Society of London in 1846 and a contributor to its Transactions. He was its secretary in 1850, vice-president 1852–6, and president in 1865 and 1866.

The College of Surgeons gave Peacock a gold medal for his valuable additions to their museum. He lived at 20 Finsbury Circus, London, an area popular with physicians at the period. He had an attack of left hemiplegia in 1877 but returned to work; in 1881, he had a slight attack of right hemiplegia, from which he also recovered. On 30 May 1882, while walking in St. Thomas's Hospital, he became suddenly unconscious, fell in one of the corridors, was carried into a ward that was formerly under his care and died there the following day without having recovered consciousness.

== Works ==
In 1848, Peacock published a monograph On the Influenza or Epidemic Catarrh of 1847–8, and in 1858, a treatise On Malformations of the Human Heart; with his Croonian lectures and a short book On the Prognosis in Cases of Valvular Disease of the Heart (1877), these were his major works. He also wrote papers in the Transactions of the Medico-Chirurgical Society and of the Pathological Society, in the Monthly Journal of Medical Science, the British and Foreign Medico-Chirurgical Review, the Transactions of the Clinical Society, and the St. Thomas's Hospital Reports. He wrote in 1865 On the weight of the Brain in the Negro in the Memoirs of the Anthropological Society of London.

== Family ==
In 1850, Peacock married Cornelia Walduck, a Quaker, who died childless in 1869.
