= Charles Theodore Williams =

English physician (1838–1912)

C. Theodore Williams
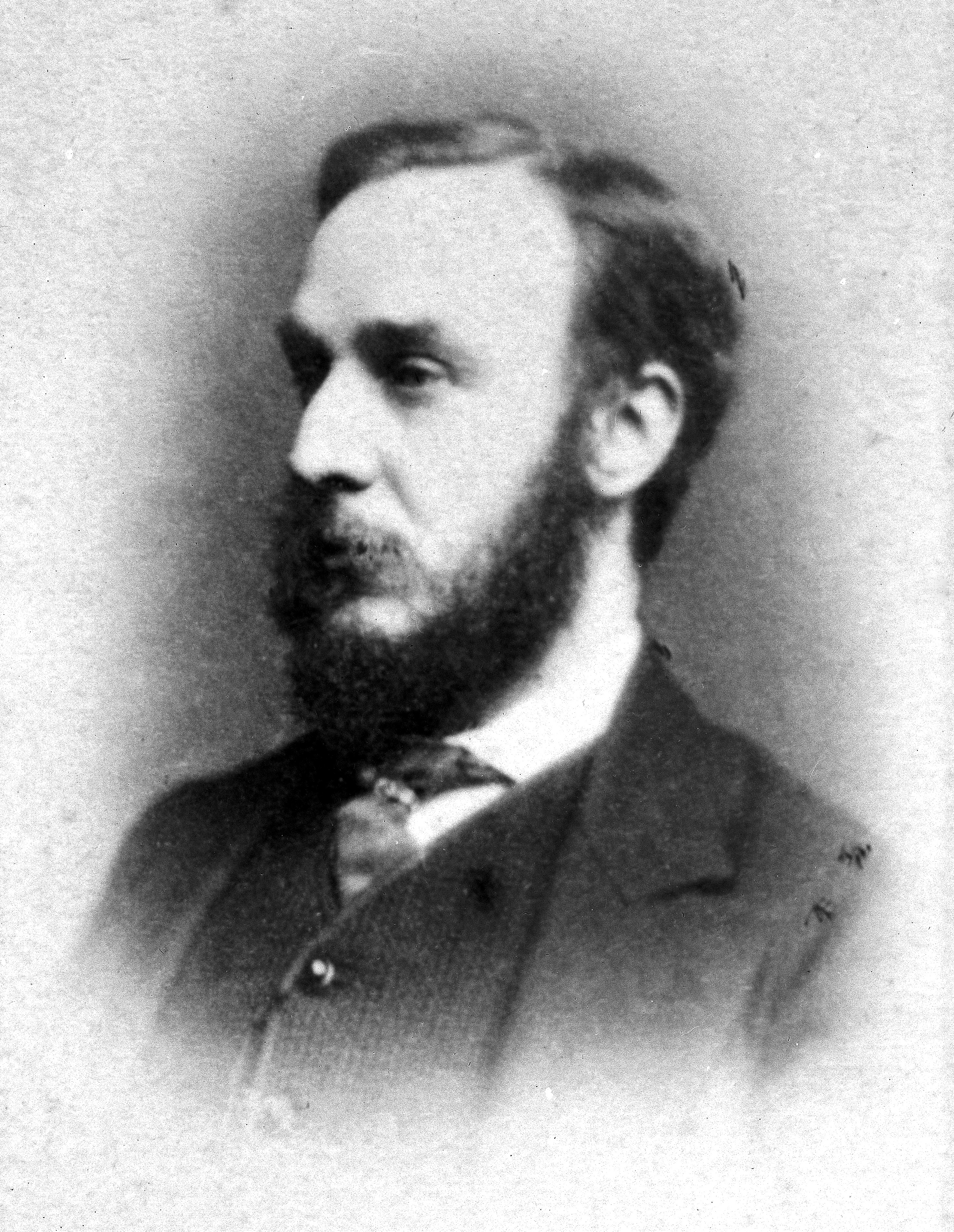
- Born: 29 August 1838
- Died: 15 December 1912 (aged 74)
- Occupation: Physician

Charles Theodore Williams FRCP, MVO (29 August 1838 – 15 December 1912) was an English physician, known as a leading authority on pulmonary tuberculosis.

== Biography ==
Charles Theodore, son of the famous physician C. J. B. Williams, was educated at Harrow School and Pembroke College, Oxford, where he received his bachelor's degree in 1860 and his M.A. in 1862. He studied medicine at St George's Hospital, Wandsworth and in Paris, receiving his M.B. in 1864. At Brompton Hospital, he became Assistant Physician in 1867, Physician in 1871, and resigned from the active staff in 1894, to become Consulting Physician. He was President of the Medical Society of London for the year 1889.

In 1868 he married Mary, daughter of John Gwyn Jeffreys.

== Honours ==
- 1871 — Lettsomian Lecturer
- 1893 — Lumleian Lecturer
- 1906 — M.V.O.
- 1911 — Harveian Orator

== Selected publications ==
- The climate of the south of France as suited to invalids: with notices of Mediterranean and other winter stations (2nd ed.). London: Longmans, Green, & Co. 1870.
- with Charles James Blasius Williams: Pulmonary consumption: its nature, varieties, and treatment, with an analysis of one thousand cases to exemplify its duration. London: Longmans, Green, & Co. 1871.
- Aero-therapeutics, or, The treatment of lung diseases by climate: being the Lumleian lectures for 1893 delivered before the Royal College of Physicians, with an address on the high altitudes of Colorado. Treatment of lung diseases by climate. London: Macmillan & Co. 1894.
- Harveian Oration on old and new views on the treatment of consumption, delivered before the Royal College of Physician of London on October 18, 1911. London: John Bale, Sons & Danielsson, Ltd. 1911.
