= William Howship Dickinson =

British doctor

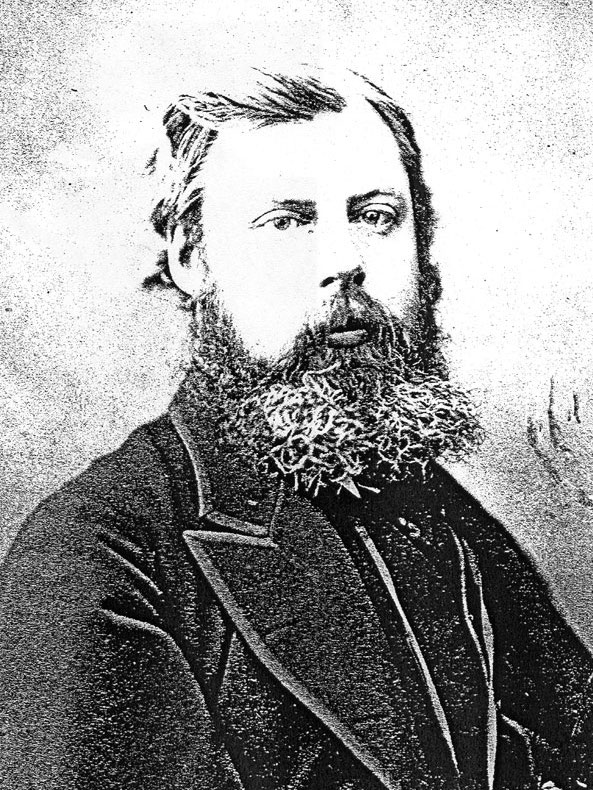
- Born: 9 June 1832; Brighton, East Sussex, England
- Died: 9 January 1913 (aged 80)
- Education: Cambridge, England
- Occupation: Doctor
- Known for: Kidney specialist

William Howship Dickinson (9 June 1832 – 9 January 1913) was a British doctor. He was educated at Cambridge and later trained at St George's Hospital.

He wrote one of the first accounts of familial kidney disease. Affected family members had proteinuria but did not have typical features of the condition known as Alport syndrome.

He worked at Great Ormond Street Hospital where he was particularly interested in children with neurological conditions. He also worked as a censor and curator of the museum at the Royal College of Physicians. He also served as an examiner in medicine to the Royal College of Surgeons, and to the universities of Cambridge, London and Durham.

He was President of the Pathological Society of London from 1889 to 1891 and President of the Royal Medical and Chirurgical Society in 1896.

He was the author of King Arthur in Cornwall; Longmans, 1900.
