= Anne Hope =

English historian (1809–1887)

- Born: 1809; Calcutta, British India
- Died: 1887 (aged 77–78)

Anne Hope (1809 – 1887), née Anne Fulton, was an English historian.

== Life ==
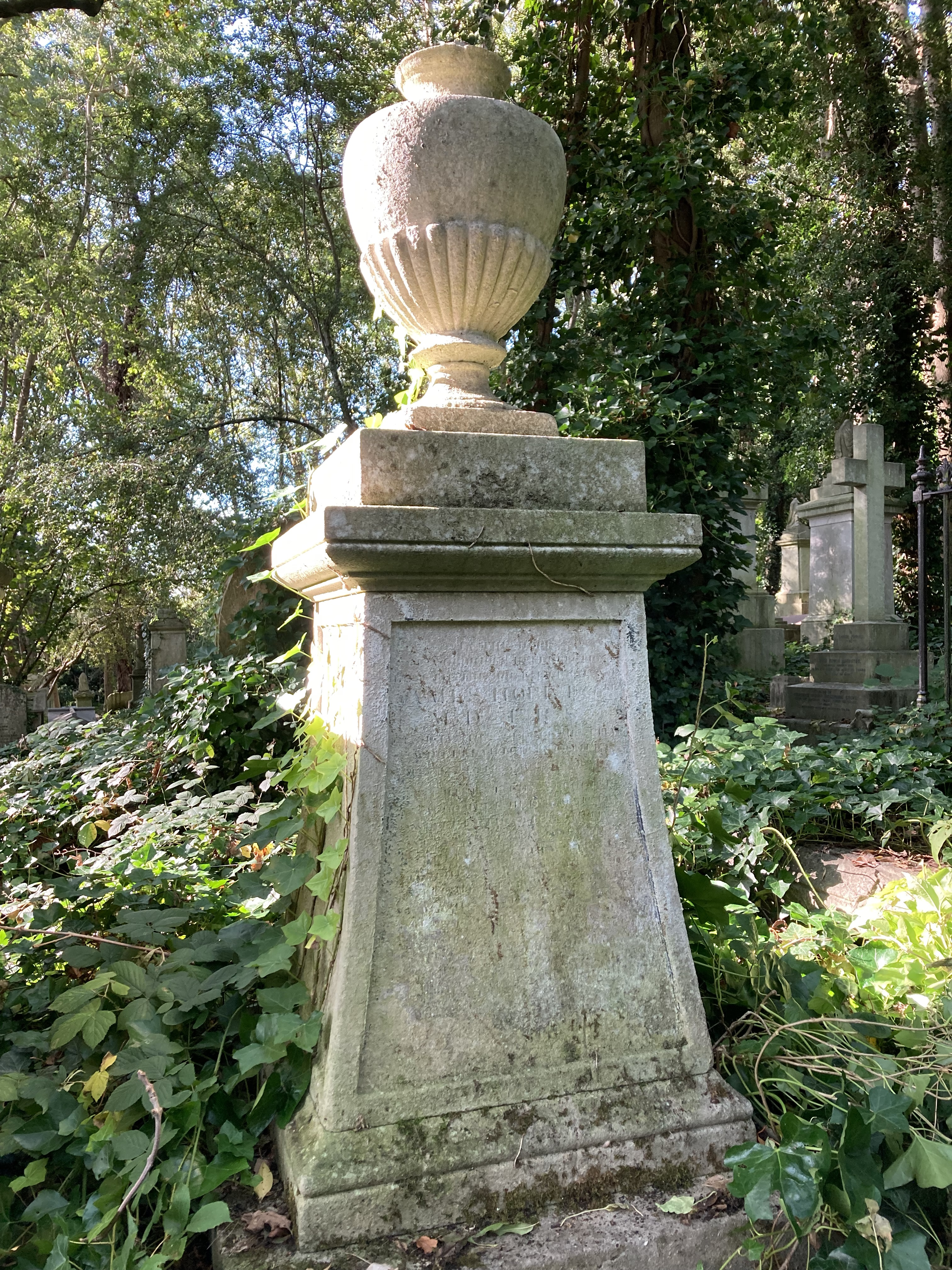
Grave of Anne Hope in Highgate Cemetery

She was born in Calcutta, where her father, John Williamson Fulton (1769–1830), was at the time a prosperous merchant; her mother was Anne, daughter of Robert Robertson, and widow of Captain John Hunt of the Bengal army, and she was the second of four daughters. At an early age she was sent from India to Lisburn, County Antrim, where her father's family resided. On her parents' return home, she settled with them in Upper Harley Street, London.

In London, Fulton met her father's friends, Daniel O'Connell, John Lawless, and other Irish parliamentary leaders. She married in 1831, and was widowed in 1841. Her health led her to spend time in Madeira between 1842 and 1850. There she studied church history, and in November 1850 she became a Roman Catholic.

Making the acquaintance of W. G. Ward and John Dobree Dalgairns, Hope lived for a time at Edgbaston, so as to be near the latter and John Henry Newman at the Birmingham Oratory. She later settled at Torquay. Although permanently disabled by a spinal complaint, she continued to write.

She died at St. Mary-church, Torquay, on 2 February 1887 and was buried with her husband James on 17 February in a family grave (plot no.316) on the western side of Highgate Cemetery.

== Works ==
Anne Hope assisted her husband in some of his publications. After his death in 1841 she prepared a memoir of him, which Dr. Klein Grant edited (1844); it went to four editions. A series of letters on self-education which she addressed to her son was published in 1842 and reissued in 1846.

In 1850 Hope completed, but did not publish, a work on the early Christian church in the first three centuries AD. She published in 1855 The Acts of the Early Martyrs, based on Pedro de Ribadeneira's Flores Sanctorum, and intended for the use of the schools connected with the Birmingham Oratory. It passed through five editions. In 1859 appeared her life of St. Philip Neri, which soon reached a third edition.

Hope completed a life of St. Thomas à Becket in 1868, and a scholarly work on the Conversion of the Teutonic Race 1872 (2 vols.); for both works Dalgairns wrote a preface. She wrote articles in the Dublin Review between 1872 and 1879, replying there to James Anthony Froude's attack on St. Thomas à Becket in 1876. Her Franciscan Martyrs in England appeared in 1878.

In 1894 Francis Aidan Gasquet edited from Hope's manuscript her First Divorce of Henry VIII.

== Family ==
In 1831 Anne Fulton married James Hope, who died in 1841. in 1843 she published a 22-page memoir of her husband. Theodore Hope was their only son.
