= Sir Andrew Clark, 1st Baronet =

Scottish physician and pathologist

Sir Andrew Clark, 1st Baronet FRS FRCPE
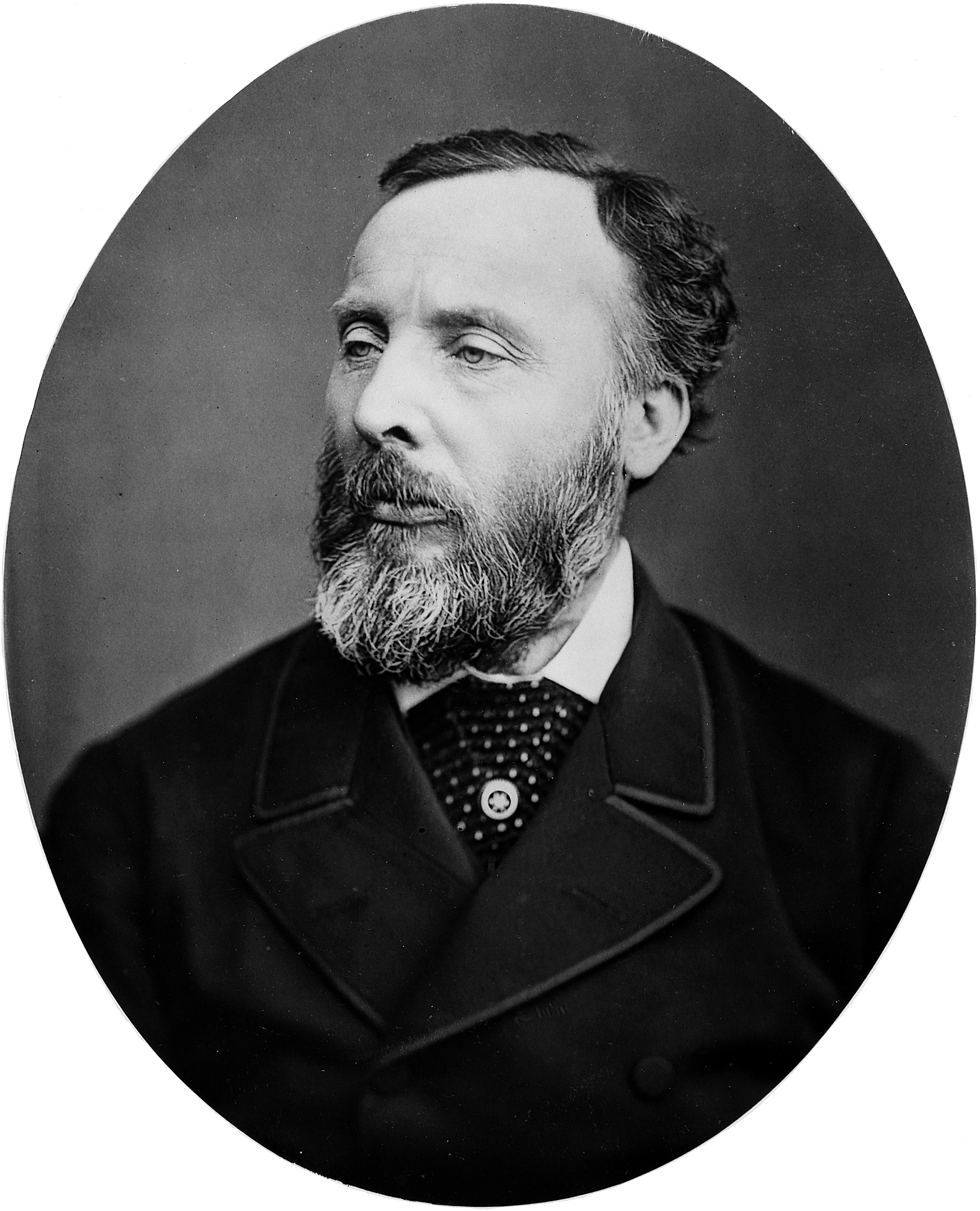
- Born: Andrew Clark; 28 October 1826; Aberdeen, Scotland
- Died: 6 November 1893 (aged 67); London,England
- Burial place: Essendon, Hertfordshire, England
- Education: High School of Dundee, University of Aberdeen
- Occupations: physician, pathologist
- Known for: President of the Clinical Society of London; President of the Royal Medical and Chirurgical Society
- Notable work: pathologist to the Haslar Hospital
- Parents: Andrew Clark (father); Amelia Anderson (mother)
- Awards: member and fellow, Royal College of Physicians

Sir Andrew Clark, 1st Baronet FRS FRCPE (28 October 1826 – 6 November 1893), was a Scottish physician and pathologist.

== Early life and education ==
Clark was born in Aberdeen, Scotland, on 28 October 1826. He was the illegitimate son of Amelia Anderson and Andrew Clark, a physician. His mother died at his birth, and his father died when Clark was seven years old. His guardians were then two wealthy uncles.

After attending school in Aberdeen, Clark was sent to Dundee to attend the High School of Dundee. He then apprenticed to a pharmacist. On returning to Aberdeen, Clark began his medical studies at the University of Aberdeen.

Soon afterward, Clark went to Edinburgh, where in the extra-academical school he had a student's career of the most brilliant description, ultimately becoming assistant to John Hughes Bennett in the Pathology Department of the Edinburgh Royal Infirmary and assistant demonstrator of anatomy to Robert Knox. However, symptoms of tuberculosis brought his academic life to a close and, in the hope that the sea might benefit his health, he joined the medical department of the Royal Navy in 1848.

== Career ==
In 1849, he became pathologist to the Haslar Hospital where Thomas Henry Huxley was one of his colleagues. In 1853, he was the successful candidate for the newly instituted post of curator to the museum of the London Hospital. There he intended to devote all his energies to pathology, but circumstances brought him into active medical practice.

In 1854, the year in which he took his doctor's degree at Aberdeen, the post of assistant physician to the hospital became vacant, and he was prevailed upon to apply for it. He was fond of telling how his tuberculosis tendencies gained him the appointment. "He is only a poor Scotch doctor," it was said, "with but a few months to live; let him have it." He had it, and two years before his death publicly declared that of those who were on the staff of the hospital at the time of his selection he was the only one remaining alive.

In 1854, he became a member of the Royal College of Physicians, and in 1858 a fellow. He subsequently held a series of offices within the college, becoming president in 1888, a position he held until his death. After his appointment as assistant physician to the London Hospital, he built one of the largest medical practices in London. Due to the high volume of patients, his consultations and prescriptions often followed standard approaches; however, in serious cases, he was noted for the thoroughness of his diagnoses.

== Honours ==
Clark delivered the Lumleian Lectures in 1867 and the Croonian Lecture in 1885 to the Royal College of Physicians, both on the subject of pulmonary conditions. Clark was created a baronet in 1883 in recognition of his services to medical science. He was elected the same year president of the Clinical Society of London. In June 1885h, Clark was elected a Fellow of the Royal Society. He was elected president of the Royal Medical and Chirurgical Society in 1892.

== Writing ==
Despite the claims of his practice, Clark wrote many books, in the precise and polished style on which he used to pride himself. Doubtless owing largely to personal reasons, lung diseases and especially lung fibrosis formed his favourite theme, but he also discussed other subjects, such as kidney failure, anemia, constipation, etc.

== Personal life ==
In 1891, Clark's daughter Mary Kane married zoologist Oldfield Thomas.

Clark died in London after a paralytic stroke. He was buried at Essendon, Hertfordshire, near his country house at Hatfield, Hertfordshire.

Baronetage of the United Kingdom
New creation	Baronet (of Cavendish Square); 1883–1893	Succeeded by James Richardson Andrew Clark
