= James Copland (physician) =

Scottish physician and medical writer

James Copland (1791–1870) was a Scottish physician and prolific medical writer.

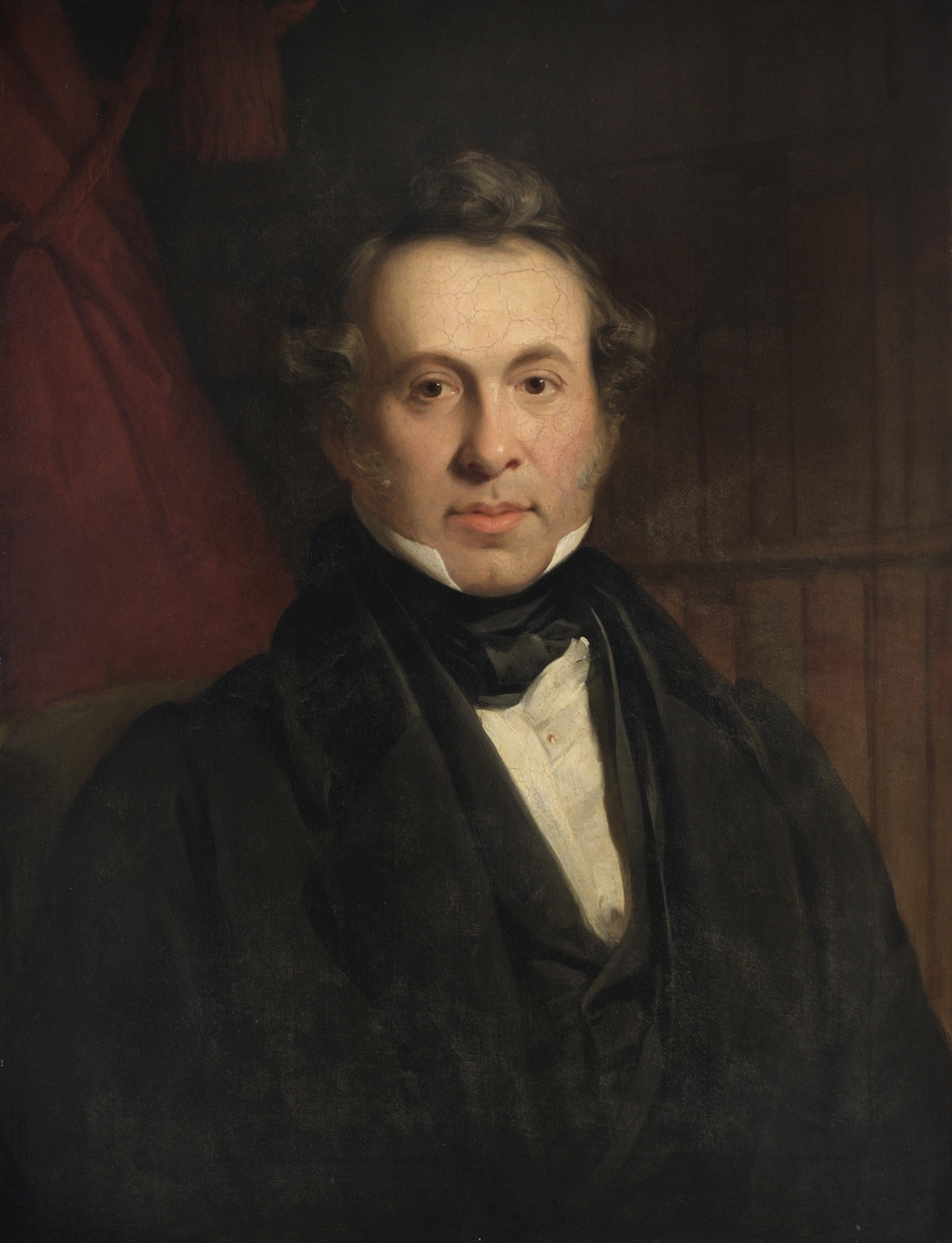
James Copland about 1835, portrait by Henry Room

== Life ==
He was born in November 1791 in Orkney, the eldest of nine children. He went to school at Lerwick, and in November 1807 entered the University of Edinburgh. His studies were at first in theology, but he graduated M.D. in 1815. He went to London, but finding no work that suited him, after eighteen months, he took a post in the Gold Coast as medical officer to the settlements of the African Company.

Copland landed at Goree, Senegal, and later in The Gambia, and Sierra Leone, studying the tropical diseases. On leaving Sierra Leone, three-quarters of the ship's crew went down with fever; and a gale carried away the masts. Copland then landed and made his way along the coast, sometimes on foot, sometimes in small trading vessels or in canoes, till he reached Cape Coast Castle, where he lived for some months.

In 1818 Copland returned to England, but shortly started on travels through France and Germany. In 1820 he became a licentiate of the College of Physicians of London, and settled in Walworth. In 1822 he took a house in Jermyn Street. In 1825 he lectured on medicine at a medical school then in Little Dean Street, and somewhat later at the Middlesex Hospital.

Copland was elected Fellow of the Royal Society in 1833, and of the College of Physicians in 1837. He attained a good practice. Among his patients was Dyce Sombre. In 1845, he was elected as a member of the American Philosophical Society. and in 1853, he was elected President of the Royal Medical and Chirurgical Society.

Copland was president of the Pathological Society, but without the respect of some of the practical morbid anatomists who attended its meetings. He was Croonian lecturer 1844, 1845, 1846; Lumleian lecturer 1854, 1855, and Harveian orator 1857. He gave up practice about a year before his death, which took place at Kilburn 12 July 1870.

== Works ==
Physicians of the time often wrote to raise their professional profile; Copland became known rather as a compiler. He began by writing on the medical topography of West Africa (Quarterly Journal of Foreign Medicine, 1820), on human rumination, on yellow fever, on hydrophobia, on cholera (London Medical Repository, 1821), and then engaged in a discussion (London Medical and Physical Journal) on chronic peritonitis (the question disputed was how to determine whether such cases were due to tubercle or merely to chronic inflammation). In 1822 he became editor of The London Medical Repository, and wrote in that journal on many subjects. John Conolly assisted him on the Repository; and John Darwall was brought in also. Robley Dunglison worked particularly on reviews.

In 1825 Copland issued a prospectus for an Encyclopædia of Medicine. In 1828 and 1829 he again issued proposals for an encyclopædia, without success. The scheme was adopted by Messrs. Longman the publishers, and in 1832 the first part was issued. The work, as the Dictionary of Practical Medicine, was ultimately finished by Copland in three volumes, with double columns, on 3,509 closely printed pages. An abridgment was published by the author in 1866. The Dictionary advocated circumcision, and argued seriously for socialism as a possible cause of insanity. Manustupration (attributed to the Dictionary as a neologism) could reduce life expectancy.

Copland was one of the noted opponents of phrenology of the 1820s and 1830s. In 1825 he published notes to the De Lys translation of Anthelme Richerand's Elements of Physiology. In his appendix to the 1829 edition he commented on the doctrines of Franz Joseph Gall. Writing later in "Insanity" in the Dictionary, Copland noted that he had undergone a phrenological reading and thought little of it.

In 1832 the dictionary article on cholera was published as a separate book, Pestilential Cholera, its Nature, Prevention, and Curative Treatment. Copland was a supporter of contingent contagionism, an attempted compromise between the view that cholera was a contagious disease, and its outright opponents. He took part in the 1849 debate with John Snow the contagionist. In 1857 he wrote on drainage and sewage.

Copland wrote in 1850 a small book On the Causes, Nature, and Treatment of Palsy and Apoplexy, and in 1861 The Forms, Complications, Causes, Prevention, and Treatment of Consumption and Bronchitis, covering also the causes and prevention of scrofula.

== Notes ==
Attribution

This article incorporates text from a publication now in the public domain: "Copland, James". Dictionary of National Biography. London: Smith, Elder & Co. 1885–1900.
