= Clinical Society of London =

The Clinical Society of London was founded in London in 1868 and merged in 1907 with the Royal Medical and Chirurgical Society of London to form the Royal Society of Medicine (RSM).

The founding of the Clinical Society was mainly due to Drs. Edward Headlam Greenhow and John Burdon Sanderson who convened a meeting to discuss the formation of a society "for the cultivation and promotion of practical medicine and surgery by the collection of cases, especially such as bear upon undetermined questions in pathology and therapeutics". Sir Thomas Watson was appointed first president and some 110 members recruited and the first general meeting held on 10 January 1868. Ordinary meetings were then held twice a month from October to May, at which short papers were submitted and discussed. The specific medical cases discussed were drawn from all branches of medicine. An annual general meeting was held at which officers were elected. Presidents served for two years.

In 1896 the society invited Professor Silvanus Phillips Thompson to demonstrate the new x-ray machine before 400 members.

When in 1907 the society merged with the RSM it numbered 572 ordinary members and 16 honorary members.

== Presidents ==
Source:Clinical Society

- 1905 Henry Hugh Clutton (last president)
- 1903 Frederick Taylor
- 1901 Howard Marsh
- 1899 Sir Richard Powell, 1st Baronet
- 1897 John Langton
- 1895 Thomas Buzzard
- 1893 John Whitaker Hulke
- 1891 Sir Dyce Duckworth
- 1889 Christopher Heath
- 1887 Sir William Henry Broadbent
- 1885 Thomas Bryant
- 1883 Sir Andrew Clark, 1st Baronet
- 1881 Joseph Lister, 1st Baron Lister
- 1879 Edward Headlam Greenhow
- 1877 George William Callender
- 1875 Sir William Jenner, 1st Baronet
- 1873 Sir Prescott Gardner Hewett, 1st Baronet
- 1871 Sir William Withey Gull, Baronet
- 1869 Sir James Paget, 1st Baronet
- 1867 Sir Thomas Watson, 1st Baronet (first president)
