= Charles James Blasius Williams =

English doctor

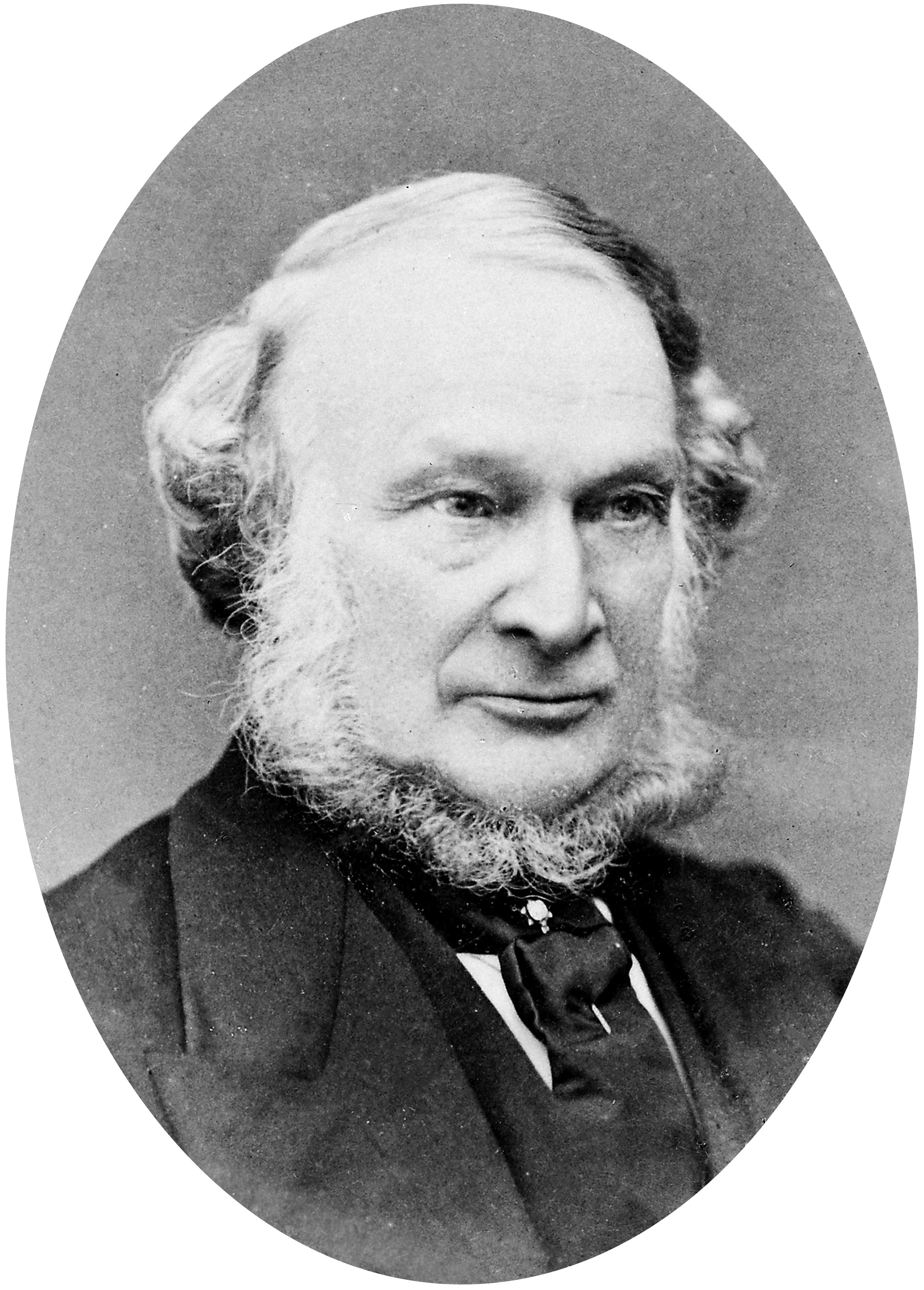
Charles James Blasius Williams in 1873

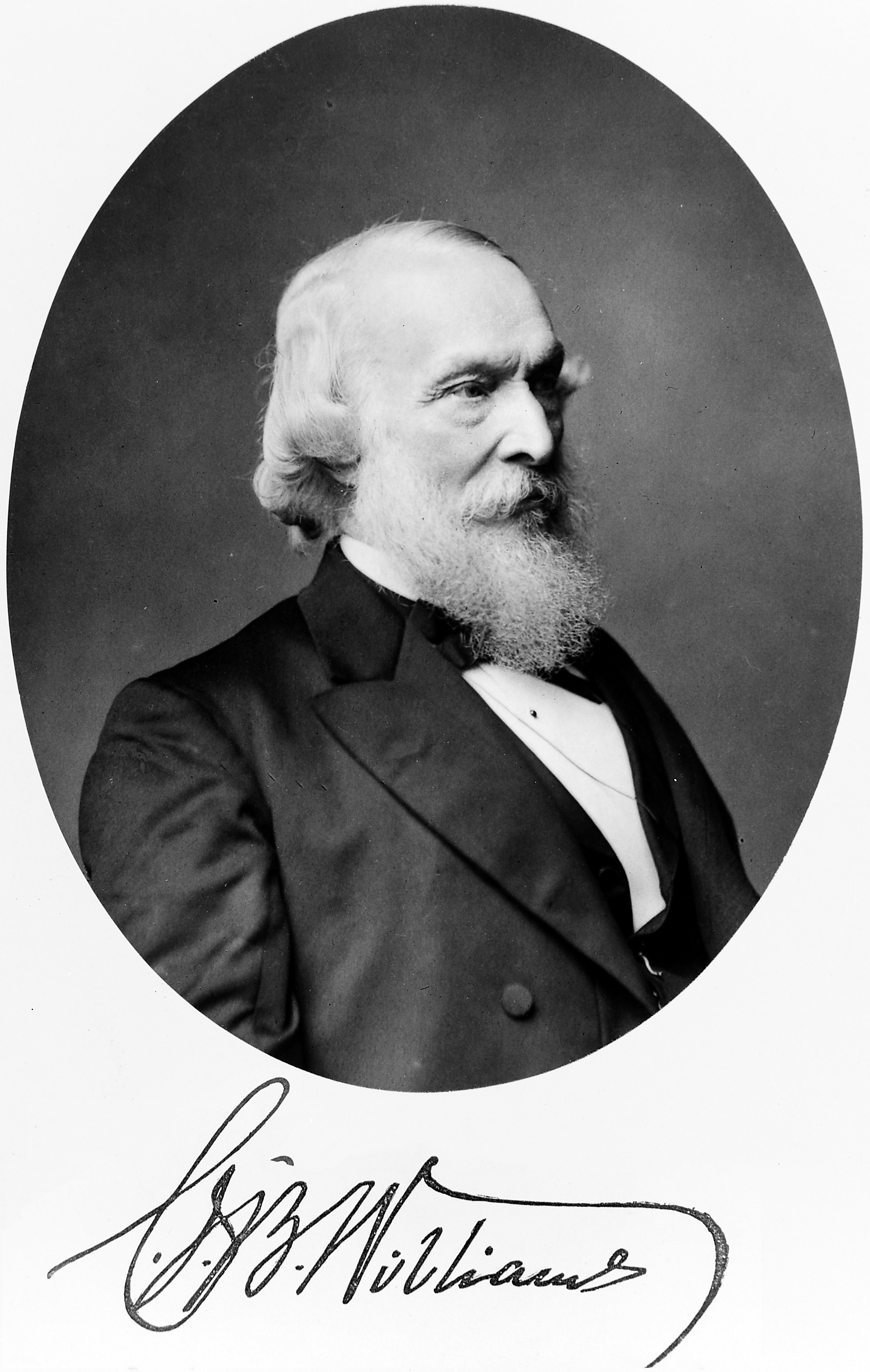
Charles James Blasius Williams.

Charles James Blasius Williams (3 February 1805 – 24 March 1889) was an English physician. He was an early adopter of new techniques of physical examination, and became known as a specialist in diseases of the chest.

== Life ==
He was the eighth child of the Rev. David Williams (1751–1836), born in the Hungerford almshouse in Wiltshire; his father, an uncle of John Williams (1792–1858) the archdeacon of Cardigan, was warden of the almshouse and curate of Heytesbury. His mother, whose maiden name was also Williams, was daughter of a surgeon in Chepstow, Monmouthshire. His father was a successful private tutor, and educated him at home; he entered the University of Edinburgh in 1820. He was there a resident pupil of Dr. John Thomson (1765–1846), and was influenced in his reading by Dr. Robert Herbert Brabant of Devizes, then living in Edinburgh. His inaugural dissertation for the degree of M.D., which he took in 1824, was On the Blood and its Changes by Respiration and Secretion.

Williams went to London, but in 1825 travelled to Paris, where he worked at drawing as well as at medicine. He attended René Laennec's clinic at the Hôpital de la Charité, and acquired the new methods of physical examination of the chest. While he was not the first British physician to use the stethoscope, which was used earlier by Thomas Davies, Williams became an important pioneer in auscultation, and was led to research heart and lung sounds, going further than Laennec. In 1827 he came back to London; he travelled with Gilbert Elliot, 2nd Earl of Minto, to Switzerland, and on his return married, in 1830, Harriet Williams Jenkins, daughter of James Jenkins of Chepstow.

Having received the license of the College of Physicians of London, Williams began practice in Half Moon Street. and in 1835 was elected a Fellow of the Royal Society. He lectured in 1836 at the anatomical school in Kinnerton Street, on diseases of the chest. In 1839 he succeeded John Elliotson as professor of medicine and physician to University College London, and moved to Holles Street, Cavendish Square.

In 1840 Williams was elected a fellow of the College of Physicians. A reformer in the medical world, soon after his admission he tried to alter the constitution of the College, but received little support. He became a censor in 1846 and 1847, and delivered the Lumleian lectures on Successes and Failures in Medicine in 1862.

Williams took part in 1841 in founding the Consumption Hospital at Brompton, and continued to support it. When the Pathological Society was formed in 1846 he was elected its first president. He moved to 24 Upper Brook Street, where he was in practice for many years, a specialist in diseases of the chest. From 1873 to 1875 he was president of the Royal Medical and Chirurgical Society, and in 1874 was appointed physician extraordinary to the queen.

In 1875 Williams gave up practice and retired to Cannes. Before leaving London he made an attempt to alter the constitution of the Royal Society. A committee was appointed to consider his views, but reported against them. He died on 24 March 1889 at Cannes.

== Works ==
While a student Williams published in the Annals of Philosophy for July 1823 a paper on the low combustion of a candle. He published in 1828 Rational Exposition of the Physical Signs of the Diseases of the Lungs and Pleura, dedicated to Sir Henry Halford, of which a third edition appeared in 1835. He wrote in 1833 ten articles for the Cyclopædia of Practical Medicine; and in 1840 the part on diseases of the chest in Alexander Tweedie's Library of Medicine. Williams collaborated during the early 1830s with James Hope the cardiologist in research on heart sounds. They worked on donkeys; both published, but the relationship soured.

In 1843 Williams published a concise Principles of Medicine, of which a second edition appeared in 1848, and a third in 1856. When in 1869 the Duchess of Somerset, disturbed by the death of her son Ferdinand Seymour, Earl St. Maur from aneurysm of the aorta, printed for private circulation an account of the illness, suggesting malpractice by Williams, he brought an action for libel. The suggestions were withdrawn. Williams was widely supported by professionals, and he himself published an Authentic Narrative of the circumstances, which reached a second edition. In 1871 with his son, Dr. Charles Theodore Williams, he published a general treatise on pulmonary consumption.

He published his autobiography, entitled Memoirs of Life and Work, in 1884. A complete list of his works was in the Catalogue of the Library of the Surgeon-general's Office, United States Army, vol. xvi.
