= Scottish Medical Journal =

- Discipline: Medicine
- Language: English
- Edited by: Professor Ghulam Nabi

Publication details
- Former names: Glasgow Medical Journal, Edinburgh Medical Journal
- History: 1822–present
- Publisher: SAGE Publications (Scotland)
- Frequency: Quarterly

Standard abbreviations
- ISO 4: Scott. Med. J.

Indexing
- ISSN: 0036-9330 (print); 2045-6441 (web)
- OCLC no.: 1765290

Links
- Journal homepage; Online access; Online archive

The Scottish Medical Journal is a general medical journal, which publishes original research in all branches of medicine, review articles, history of medicine articles, and clinical memoranda. The editor-in-chief is Ghulam Nabi (University of Dundee).

== History ==
The journal obtained its current form in 1956 after a merger of the Glasgow Medical Journal and the Edinburgh Medical Journal, which were themselves founded in 1822 and 1855, respectively. It is published by SAGE Publications and is supported and sponsored by a number of learned societies and colleges.

=== Edinburgh Medical Journal ===
The Edinburgh Medical Journal was the successor of the Edinburgh Medical and Surgical Journal (1805–1855) which in turn had predecessors that can be traced back to the 1733 Medical Essays and Observations. It was the house journal of the Edinburgh College of Physicians and focused on scholarly papers such as articles and reviews, including translated extracts from German and French works, while also reporting on the meetings of medical societies. By 1874 it was widely distributed in England.
