= Sir Thomas Watson, 1st Baronet =

British physician (1792–1882)

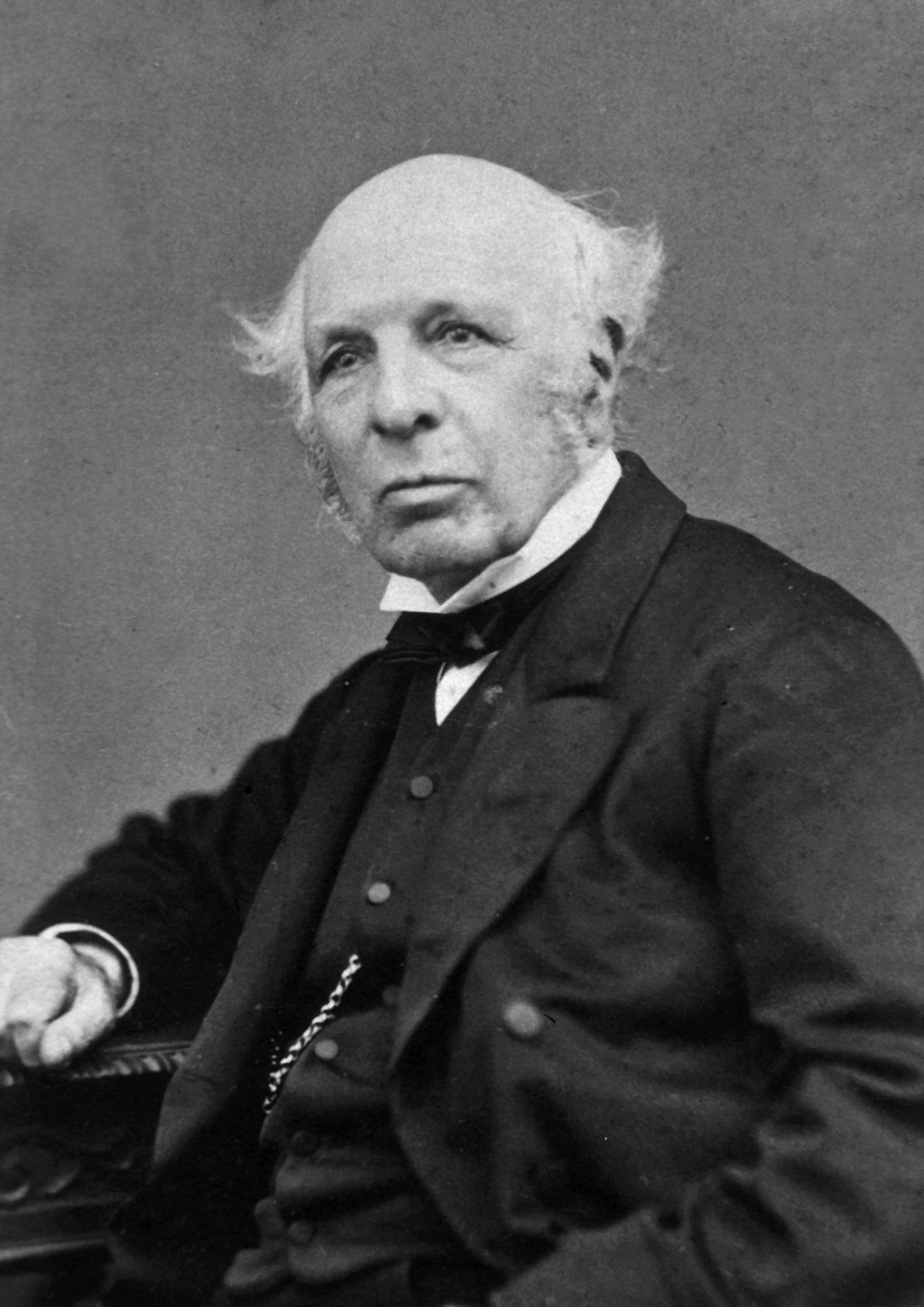
Thomas Watson

Sir Thomas Watson, 1st Baronet (1792 – 11 December 1882) was an English physician who is primarily known for describing the water hammer pulse found in aortic regurgitation in 1844. He was president of the Royal College of Physicians from 1862 to 1866.

He was born in 1792, the son of Joseph Watson, in Kentisbeare near Honiton, East Devon, and educated at Bury St Edmunds Grammar School. He entered St John's College, Cambridge, graduating in 1815. He was elected a fellow of the Royal College of Physicians in 1826 and delivered the Gulstonian Lecture in 1827 and the Lumleian lecture in 1831.

He studied medicine at St Bartholomew's Hospital and Edinburgh and graduated M.D. from Cambridge University in 1825. He was appointed physician to the Middlesex hospital in 1827 and was professor of clinical medicine at the University of London for a year before transferring to King's College as professor of Forensic Medicine and later professor of Principles and Practice of Medicine.

In 1833, Dominic Corrigan, a British physician, first described the visible abrupt distention and collapse of carotid arteries in patients with aortic insufficiency. Watson went on to investigate the palpable pulse in these patients and, following his elaboration, the clinical sign is also referred to as Watson's pulse.

He resigned his chair at King's College in 1840 and his post in the Middlesex hospital in 1843 and in 1859 was appointed physician extraordinary to the queen. He was created a baronet in 1866 and in 1870 was appointed physician in ordinary to the queen.

In 1857 he was elected to serve for two years as president of the Pathological Society and in 1859 was elected a Fellow of the Royal Society, In 1868 he was elected president of the Clinical Society of London.

== Publications ==
- "Zymotic Disease", the origin of disease being due to contagion, Scientific American article, 7 July 1877, p. 5
