= Theodore Hope =

British-born civil servant in the government of India

Sir Theodore Cracraft Hope KCSI CIE
- Born: 9 December 1831
- Died: 4 July 1915 (aged 83)
- Burial place: Highgate Cemetery
- Citizenship: British
- Education: master's certificate
- Alma mater: Rugby School, Haileybury
- Occupations: Civil servant, writer
- Employer: East India Company
- Notable work: Gujarati Bhashanu Vyakaran (1858)
- Spouse: Josephine Fulton (m. 1861)
- Children: No
- Parents: James Hope (father); Anne Hope (mother)

Sir Theodore Cracraft Hope KCSI CIE (9 December 1831 – 4 July 1915), often referred to as T. C. Hope, was a British born civil servant of the Government of India. His duties included Public Works, and he was an active layman of the Anglican Church.

== Life ==
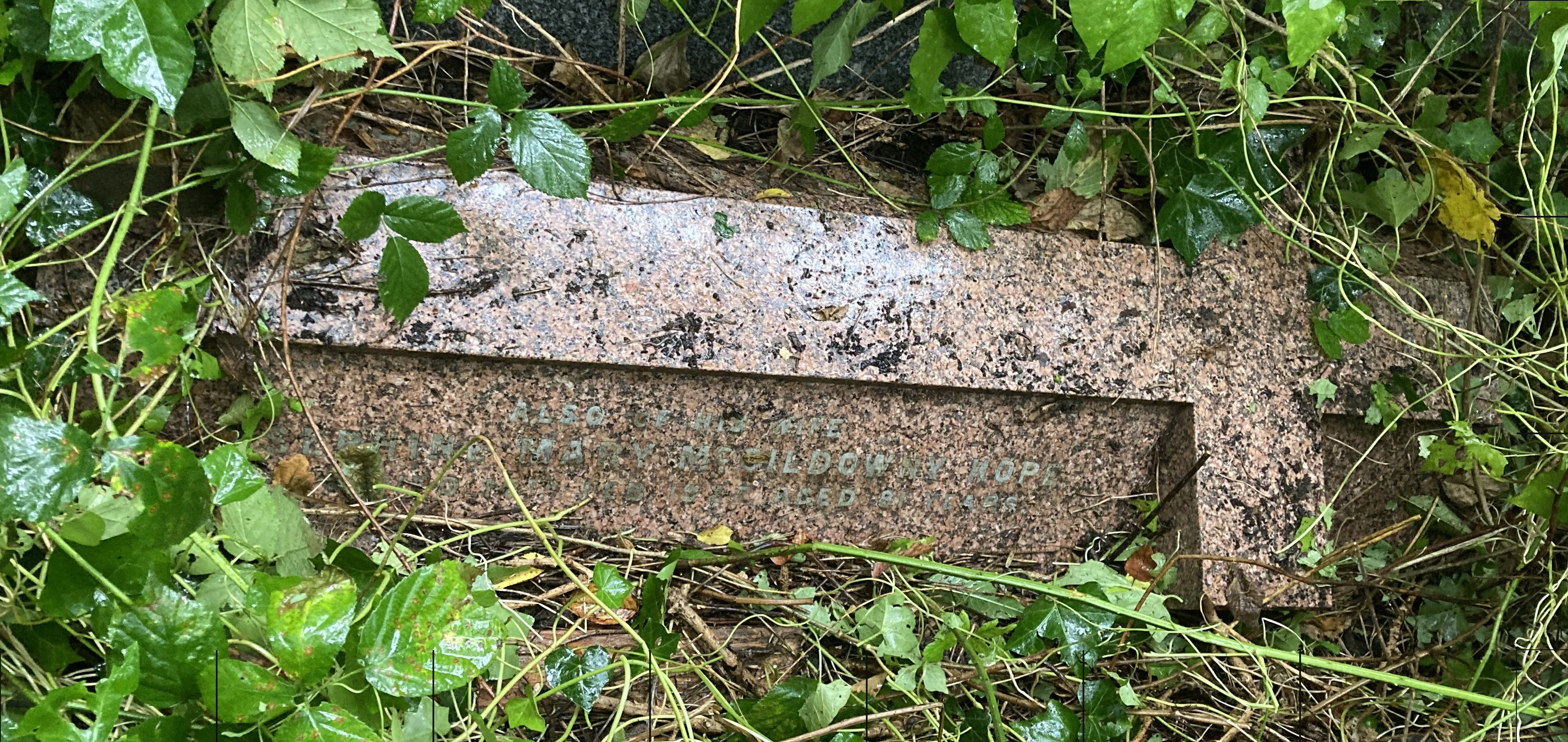
Grave of Theodore Hope in Highgate Cemetery

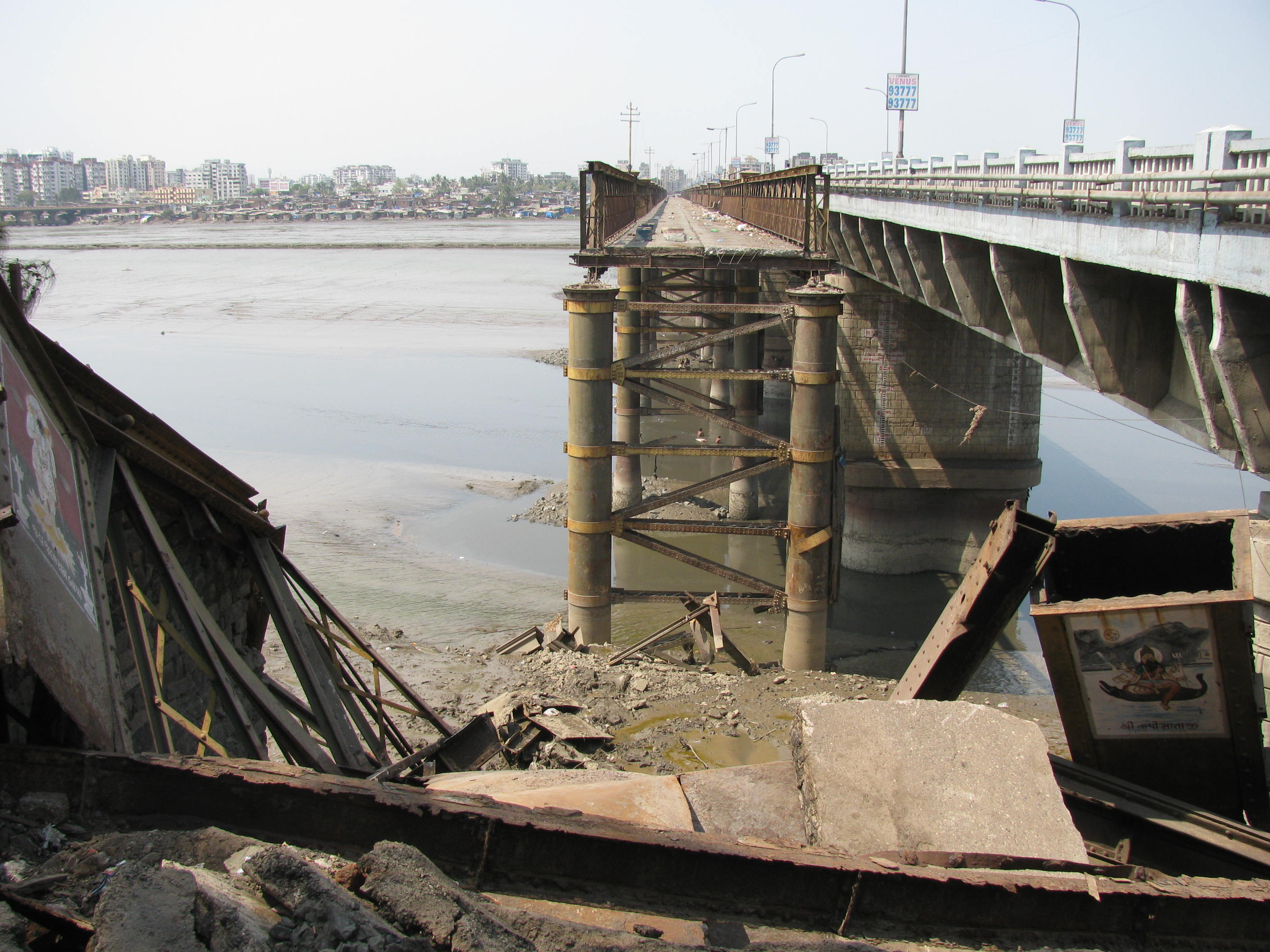
Hope Bridge of Surat was built on Tapi river when he was district collector and magistrate. The bridge's foundation was laid in 1874 and it was completed in 1877. The bridge was dismantled in 2015 and replaced by new bridge keeping the old design of Hope Bridge.

Born in 1831, Theodore Hope was the only child of Dr. James Hope, F.R.S., a wealthy physician at St George's Hospital, whose research in connection with heart disease was cut short by his death from consumption in middle life. Theodore's mother, Anne was an author. Hope was privately educated for the most part, with spells at Rugby School, and afterwards at Haileybury, then the East India Company's college. From frequent yachting practice abroad he was able to secure a master's certificate before he was 20; and when he joined the Bombay Civil Service in 1853 he spoke five European languages.

Within two years of landing Hope became Inspector in Gujarat, India for the newly formed Education Department. With native scholars such as Dalpatram, he prepared a series of Gujarati textbooks which later came to be known as Hope Vachanmala (Hope's Readers). Next he served Sir George Clerk, the Governor, as private secretary, and then was given charge of the Ahmedabad district, where he pursued his archeological hobbies, and when he came home on long leave in 1865-66 he published three large works of the architectural monuments of Ahmedabad, Bijapur, and Dharwar. Returning to India, he spent eight years as Collector of Surat, and in 1871 he was called to Bombay, to preside over a committee appointed to deal with the unsatisfactory state of municipal finance. For a time he filled the post of the Commissioner there.

He represented his province in the Viceregal Legislature in India and served also as secretary in the Revenue Department, and was made Secretary for Famine at the close of 1876. In 1880 he was appointed provisional member of the Bombay Government, but did not take up the post, as he was required at headquarters as Secretary of the Finance Department. In 1882 he became Public works Member of the Governor-General's Council and his 5½ years in that position were marked by a railway development which raised the open mileage from 8,000 to 14,000, and also by an advance of 20 per cent in the area of land brought under irrigation. He was made a C.I.E. in 1882, and a K.C.S.I. four years later. He left India in 1888.

Sir Theodore married in 1866 Josephine Fulton, the only daughter of Mr. J. W. Fulton, of Braidujle House, County Down. They had no children. He died on 4 July 1915 and is buried with his wife on the western side of Highgate Cemetery (plot no 29005).

== Books ==
He had published Gujarati Bhashanu Vyakaran (The grammar of Gujarati language) (1858) which was one of the earlier attempts to write grammar of Gujarati.

Another book is Surat, Broach and Other Old Cities of Goojerat.
