= Medical and Chirurgical Society of London =

Medical society

The Royal Medical and Chirurgical Society of London (RMCS), created in 1805 as the Medical and Chirurgical Society of London, was a learned society of physicians and surgeons, that received a Royal charter in 1834, and a supplement charter in 1907 to create the newly merged Royal Society of Medicine.

== Origins ==
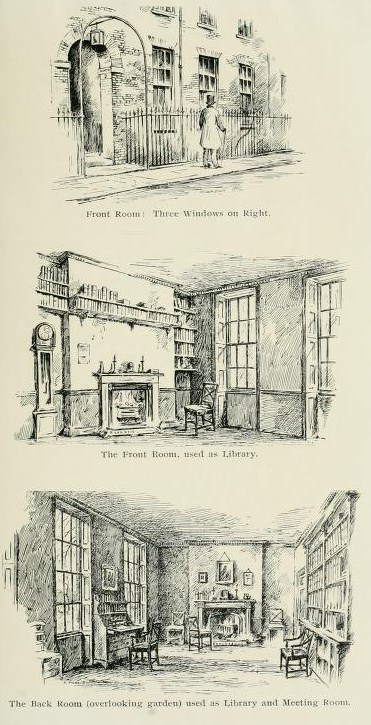
Initial premises of the Society, 1805–1810, in 2 Verulam Buildings, Gray's Inn.

The RMCS was founded in 1805 as the Medical and Chirurgical Society of London, by 26 medical men who left the Medical Society of London (founded 1773) in reaction to the autocratic style of its president, James Sims. Among its founders there were William Saunders (1743–1817), its first president; John Yelloly (1774–1842), Sir Astley Cooper (1768–1841), the first treasurer; Alexander Marcet (1770–1822) and Peter Mark Roget (1779–1869).

According to its charter, the Medical and Chirurgical Society of London was founded "for the purpose of conversation on professional subjects, for the reception of communications and for the formation of a library" and served "several branches of the medical profession". It first met on 22 May 1805 at Freemasons' Tavern on Great Queen Street.

== Royal Society of Medicine ==
In 1907 several specialist medical societies merged with the RMCS. On 12 June 1907, a supplement charter was granted by King Edward VII and the new amalgamation became the RSM. The 17 societies which merged with the Medical and Chirurgical Society to form the RSM were: (Note: Others list these as 15 societeies.)

- Pathological Society of London (1846–1907)
- Epidemiological Society of London (1850–1907)
- Odontological Society of Great Britain (1856–1907)
- Obstetrical Society of London (1858–1907)
- Clinical Society of London (1867–1907)
- Dermatological Society of London (1882–1907)
- British Gynaecological Society (1884–1907)
- Neurological Society of London (1886–1907)
- British Laryngological, Rhinological and Otological Association (1888–1907)
- Laryngological Society of London (1893–1907)
- Society of Anaesthetists (1893–1908)
- Dermatological Society of Great Britain and Ireland (1894–1907)
- British Balneological and Climatology Society (1895–1909)
- Otological Society of the United Kingdom (1899–1907)
- Society for the Study of Diseases in Children (1900–1908)
- British Electrotherapy Society (1901–1907)
- Therapeutical Society (1902–1907)

== Honorary fellows ==
Honorary Fellows of the society included Charles Darwin, Louis Pasteur, Edward Jenner and Sigmund Freud. Other presidents of note were the "three great from Guy's Hospital", Richard Bright (1837); Thomas Addison (1849) and Sir James Paget (1875), as well as Joseph Hodgson (1851) and Frederick William Pavy (1900).

== Presidents ==
- 1906 John Warrington Haward
- 1904 Richard Douglas Powell
- 1902 Alfred Willett
- 1900 Frederick William Pavy
- 1898 Thomas Bryant
- 1896 William Howship Dickinson
- 1894 Jonathan Hutchinson
- 1893 Sir William Church, 1st Baronet
- 1892 Sir Andrew Clark (died 1893)
- 1890 Timothy Holmes
- 1888 Edward Henry Sieveking
- 1886 George David Pollock
- 1884 George Johnson
- 1882 John Marshall
- 1881 Andrew Whyte Barclay
- 1879 John Eric Erichsen
- 1877 Charles West
- 1875 James Paget
- 1873 Charles James Blasius Williams
- 1871 Thomas Blizard Curling
- 1869 Sir George Burrows
- 1867 Samuel Solly
- 1865 James Alderson
- 1863 Richard Partridge
- 1861 Benjamin Guy Babington
- 1859 Frederic Carpenter Skey
- 1857 Sir Charles Locock
- 1855 Caesar Henry Hawkins
- 1853 James Copland
- 1851 Joseph Hodgson
- 1849 Thomas Addison
- 1847 James Moncrieff Arnott
- 1845 William Frederick Chambers
- 1843 Edward Stanley
- 1841 Robert Williams
- 1839 Sir Benjamin Collins Brodie
- 1837 Richard Bright
- 1835 Henry Earle
- 1833 John Elliotson
- 1831 Sir William Lawrence
- 1829 Peter Mark Roget
- 1827 Benjamin Travers
- 1825 George Birkbeck
- 1823 John Abernethy
- 1821 John Cooke
- 1819 Sir Astley Paston Cooper
- 1817 William Babington
- 1815 Henry Cline
- 1813 Sir Gilbert Blane
- 1810 Sir Henry Halford
- 1808 Matthew Baillie
- 1805 William Saunders

== See also ==
- List of the founding medical men of the Royal Medical and Chirurgical Society of London
