= Anthelme Richerand =

French Physician

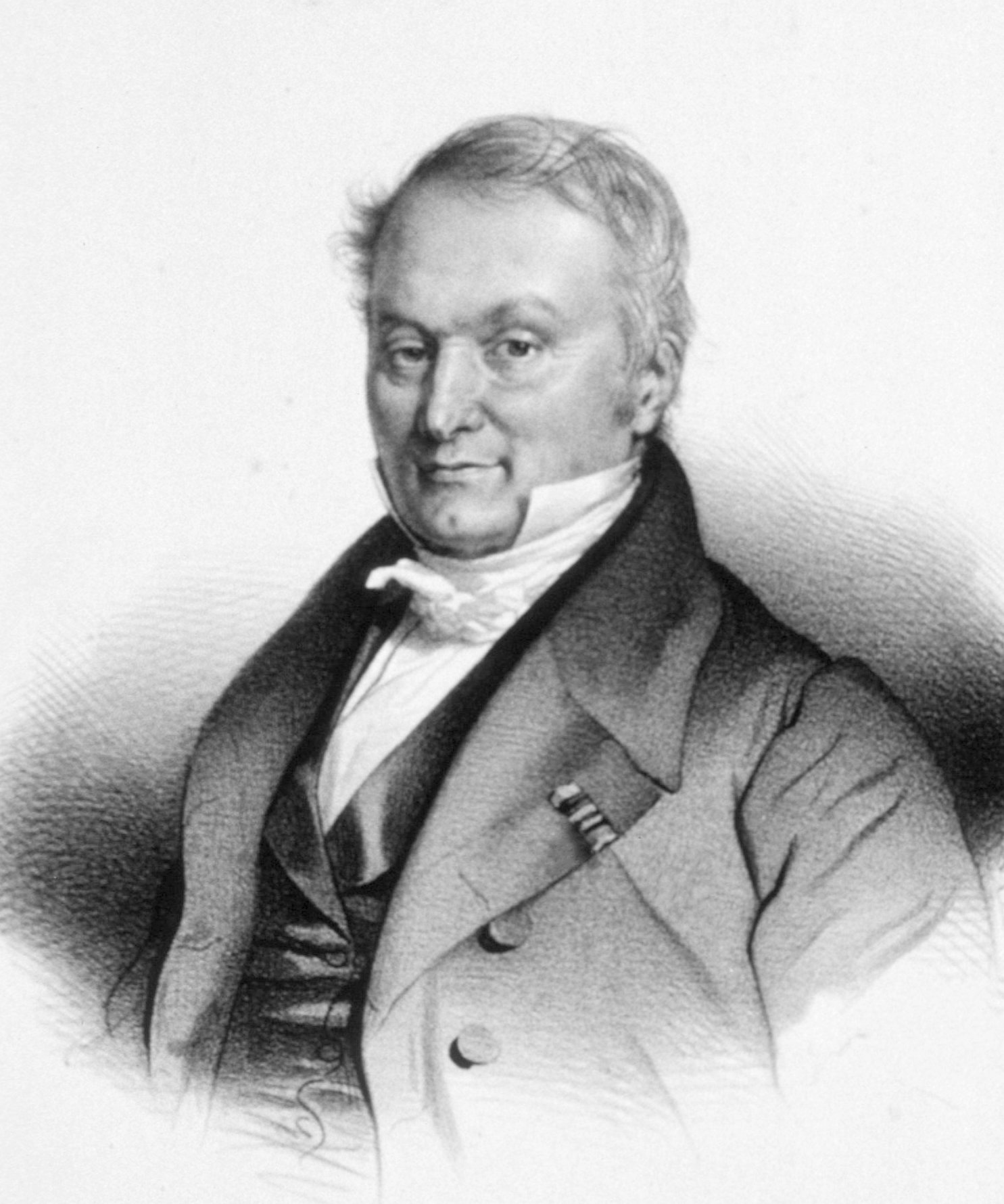
A lithograph of Anthelme Richerand from 1820

Anthelme Louis Claude Marie Richerand (also known as Anthelme-Balthasar Richerand), was born on February 4, 1779 in Belley and died on January 23, 1840 in Paris. He was a French surgeon, physiologist, and a member of the Academy of Medicine.

== Biography ==
Richerand's father was a fourth-generation lawyer/notary. His father died at a young age. His mother remarried after a few years of widowhood.

Richerand studied at the Collège de Belley, the boys' school and seminary where he was a classmate of Joseph Récamier. In 1794, he enrolled at the newly founded École de Santé in Paris, which was created in 1794 by the National Convention. He distinguished himself among the new students by his talent as a writer writing a critique of his professors entitled "Analyses raisonnées des leçons de ses maîtres" (Reasoned Analyses of the Lessons of His Teachers). In order to support himself through his studies, Richerand supported himself by giving anatomy and physiology lessons. On August 2, 1799, he defended his doctoral thesis in medicine on the fractures in the neck of the femur.

Thanks to the support of close acquaintances, he avoided military service and in 1801 he published "Nouveaux Éléments de Physiologie" (The New Elements of Physiology), which went through ten subsequent editions and was translated into several languages. This book provoked controversy at the time among the students of Xavier Bichat, a promenant physician who had recently died, since this book questioned certain principles of Bichat’s work "Traité des membranes (1800–1801)".

On December 19, 1800, Richerand was appointed assistant surgeon at the Hospice du Nord (the future Hôpital Saint-Louis). A year later, Richerand was named second-class surgeon. Between 1805 and 1806, he published his Traité de Nosographie chirurgicale in 3 volumes. Where he proposed the predominance of surgery over medicine. On July 24, 1806, he was appointed major surgeon of the Paris Guard. The following year in 1807, he was named the chair of surgical pathology by imperial decree. More concerned, at this time of his life, with his professional career than with political events, he nevertheless became friends with Cabanis and frequented the Société d'Auteuil with him.

On Thursday, April 11, 1811, he married Elisabeth Martin de Gibergues (1792–1868). The couple had three children: Anthelmine Marie (1814–1849), Vladimir, Baron Richerand (1816–1893), and Pierre Magloire Sosthène Richerand (1829–1915).

After the collapse of the Empire in 1814, Saint-Louis Hospital was repurposed as an extensive military infirmary. Both the hospital and Richerand were devoted to treating the wounded of all nationalities. Richerand distinguished himself during the Battle of Paris by continuing to care for the wounded. In August 1814, he was made a Chevalier of the Legion of Honor. Richerand devoted himself tirelessly to the of all patients and vigorously fought a typhus epidemic that arose due to the war. On February 16, 1815, he received letters of nobility from Louis XVIII, who later chose him as his personal surgeon (Richerand was later elevated to the hereditary nobility as a Baron in 1829).

His reputation now firmly established, his scholarly output flourished between 1815 and 1820. In 1820, the year of its founding, Richerand was elected a full member of the Académie nationale de médecine in the surgery section.

During this time, Richerand was a noted gourmand. He formed a lifelong friendship with Jean Anthelme Brillat-Savarin and is quoted in his book. Richerand was present at Brillat-Savarin's death.

In 1825, in his "Histoire des progrès récents de la chirurgie" (History of the Recent Progress of Surgery), he openly criticized several French surgeons, among them Guillaume Dupuytren, who was a notable person of the time. The dispute caused an uproar within the Academy and the Faculty of Medicine, where the mutual attacks shocked the medical world. In the same book, Richerand also expressed admiration for English science and its practitioners—an attitude that significantly contributed to his public discredit in France.

He turned away from the exercise of his profession to confine himself to literary studies: he lived most of the year in his country house in Villecresnes and received some members of the French Academy there. Upon his death in 1840, his funeral took place at Saint-Sulpice and he was buried at Villecresnes; according to his wishes, no speech was given

== Awards and honors ==
On the 7th of May 1851 a street in Paris was named after Richerand in the 10th arrondissement. It is located near the Hôpital Saint-Louis.

== Works ==
- Richerand, Anthelme (1815–1825). Ambroise Paré, le Plutarque français (in French).
- Richerand, Anthelme Balthasar (1798). Dissertation anatomico-chirurgicale sur les fractures du col du fémur (in French). Paris: Crapelet.
- Nouveaux élémens de physiologie, Paris, (1801).
- Richerand, Anthelme Balthasar baron (1837). Nouveaux éléments de physiologie (in French). Brussels: H. Dumont.
- Nosographie chirurgicale, Crapart, Caille et Ravier (Paris), 1805, (2 vol.).
- Richerand, Anthelme (1810). Des Erreurs populaires relatives à la Medecine (in French). Paris: Crapelet.
- Richerand, Anthelme (1815). Nosographie chirurgicale, ou nouveaux élémens de pathologie (in French). Paris: Caille et Ravier.
- Richerand, Anthelme (1812). Des erreurs populaires relatives à la médecine (in French) (deuxième édition ed.). Paris: Caille et Ravier.
- De l'enseignement actuel de la médecine et de la chirurgie (1816).
- Histoire d'une résection des côtes et de la plèvre, [Thèse], Caille et Ravier (Paris), 1818.
- Richerand, Anthelme Balthasar (1825). Histoire des progrès récens de la chirurgie (in French). Paris: Béchet jeune.
- "Des officiers de santé et des jurys médicaux". Gazette médicale de Paris (in French). 2, 2nd Series (5): 66–69. 1834.
- De la population dans ses rapports avec la nature des gouvernements (1837).

In collaboration:

- Lec̜ons sur les maladies des os, [rédigées en un traité complet de ces maladies par Anth. Richerand], avec Alexis Boyer, Mignerat (Paris), 1803.
- Histoire d'une résection des côtes et de la plèvre, avec Joseph François Louis Deschamps, Caille et Ravier (Paris), 1818.
