= Richard Bright (physician) =

British pathologist (1789–1858)

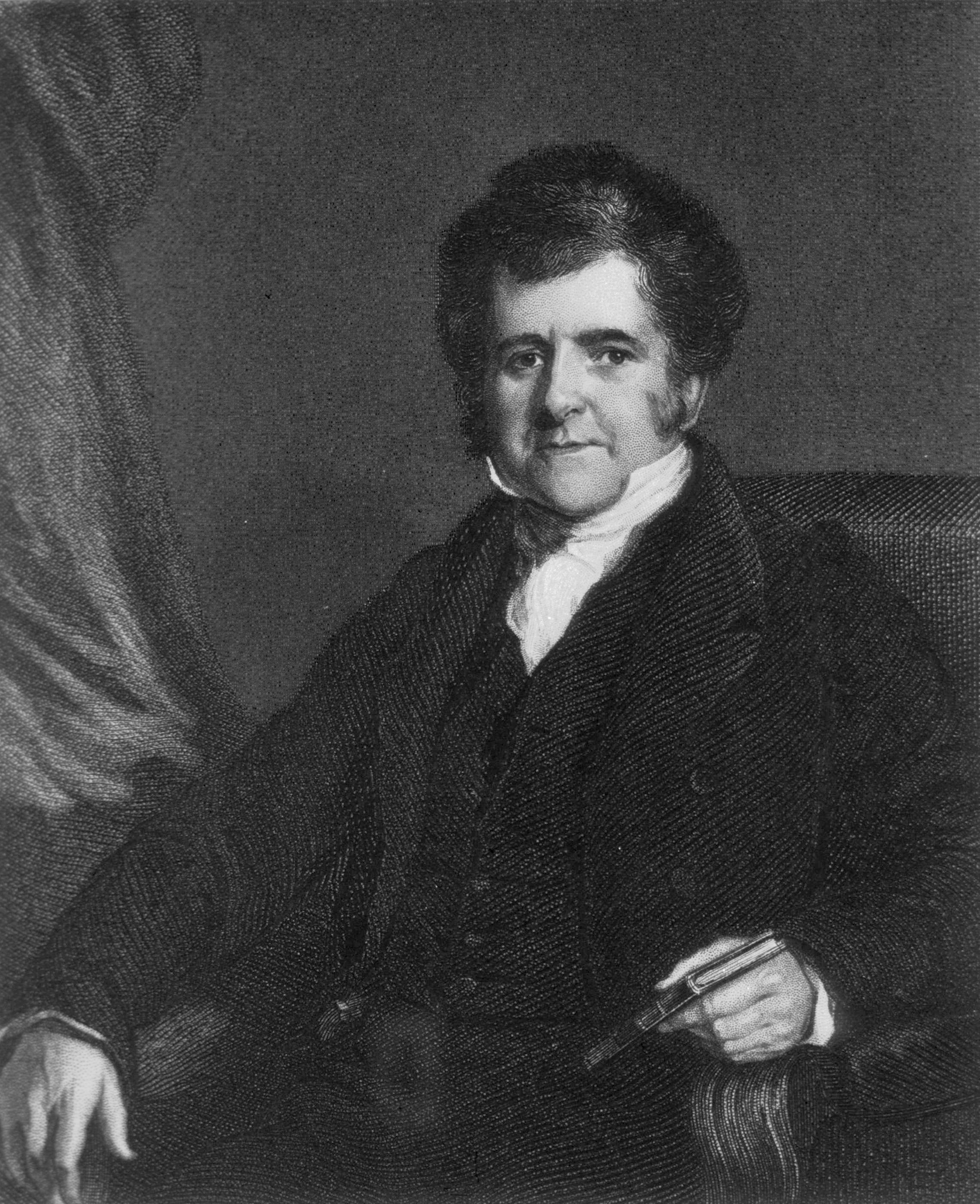
- Born: 3 April 1789; Bristol, England
- Died: 16 December 1858 (aged 69); London, England

Richard Bright (28 September 1789 – 16 December 1858) was an English physician and early pioneer in the research of kidney disease. He is particularly known for his description of Bright's disease.

== Biography ==
Richard Bright was born in Bristol, Gloucestershire, the third son of Sarah and Richard Bright Sr., a wealthy merchant and banker. Bright Sr. shared his interest in science with his son, encouraging him to consider it as a career. In 1808, Bright Jr. joined the University of Edinburgh to study philosophy, economics and mathematics, but switched to medicine the following year. In 1810, he accompanied Sir George Mackenzie on a summer expedition to Iceland where he conducted naturalist studies. Bright then continued his medical studies at Guy's Hospital in London and in September 1813 returned to Edinburgh to be granted his medical doctorate. His thesis was De erysipelate contagioso (On contagious erysipelas).

During the 1820s and 1830s Bright again worked at Guy's Hospital, teaching, practising and researching medicine. There he worked alongside two other celebrated medical pioneers, Thomas Addison and Thomas Hodgkin. His research into the causes and symptoms of kidney disease led to his identifying what became known as Bright's disease. For this, he is considered the "father of nephrology". He was elected a Fellow of the Royal Society in 1821. He was President of the Royal Medical and Chirurgical Society in 1837.

Bright had a special affection for Hungary and in 1815 he lived in Festetics Castle in Keszthely, where there is a large plaque: "To the memory of the English physician scientist and traveller who was one of the pioneers in the accurate description of Lake Balaton.”

He delivered the Lumleian Lectures in 1837 on "Disorders of the Brain" and the Gulstonian lectures in 1833 on the "Function of the Abdominal Viscera" at the Royal College of Physicians.

=== Death ===
On 11 December 1858, Bright became severely ill due to complications of heart disease and was unable to recover. He died in London aged 69 and was buried in Kensal Green Cemetery. A memorial to him lies within St James's Church, Piccadilly.

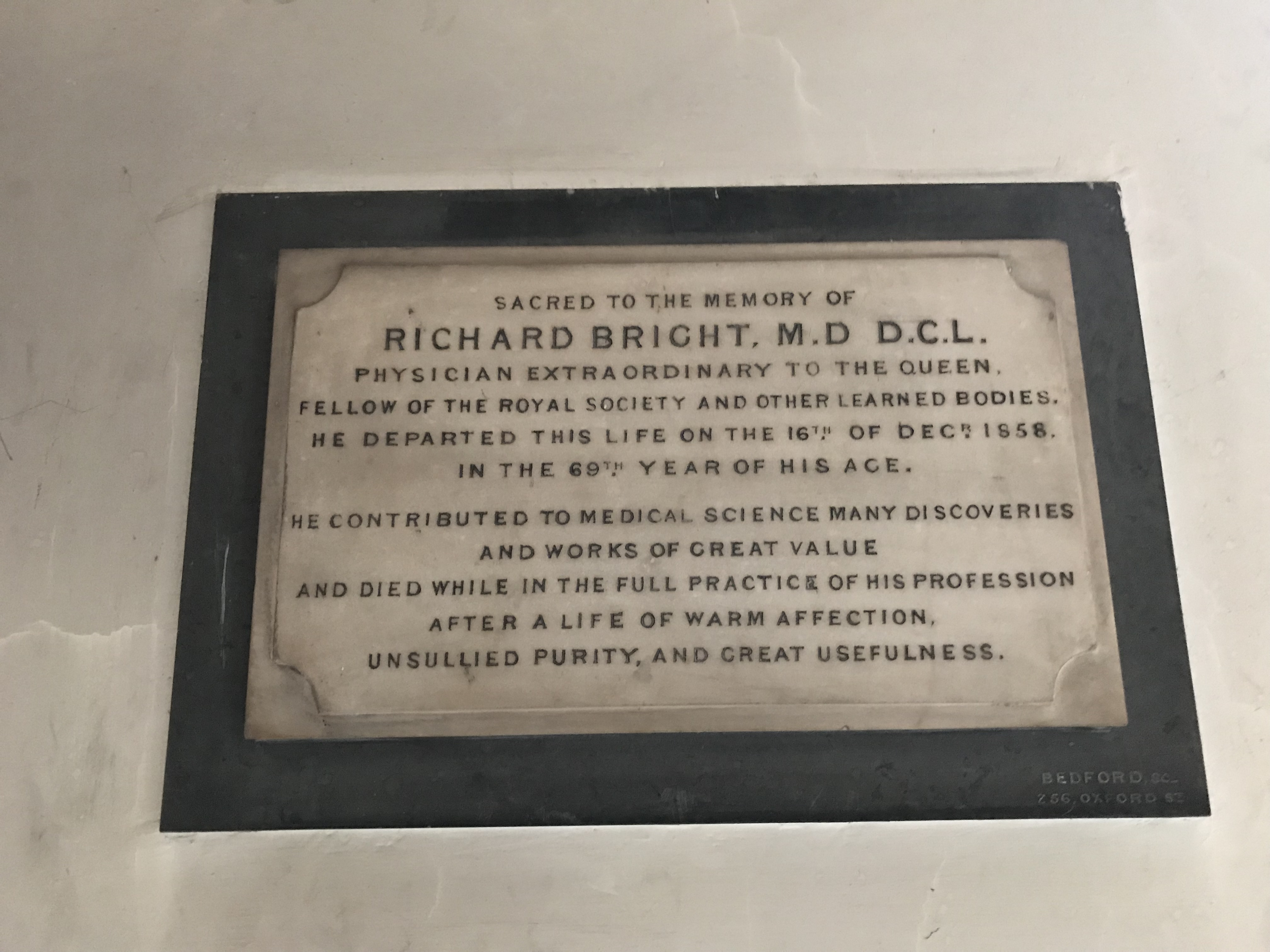
A memorial to Richard Bright in St James's Church, Piccadilly.

Bright had two sons. The younger also became a physician; the elder, James Franck Bright, a historian.

== Cultural references ==
When asked if he had ever been seriously ill, S. J. Perelman quipped, "Why, yes. I had Bright's disease. And he had mine."

He lived at 11 Savile Row, London, which is now commemorated by a blue plaque. This address was the filming location of the tailor's shop in the Kingsman films and the plaque can be seen outside.

== Artistic recognition ==
A bust of Bright is held at the Royal College of Physicians of Edinburgh.

== See also ==
- List of pathologists
