= George William Callender =

English surgeon

George William Callender (1830–1879) was an English surgeon.

== Life ==
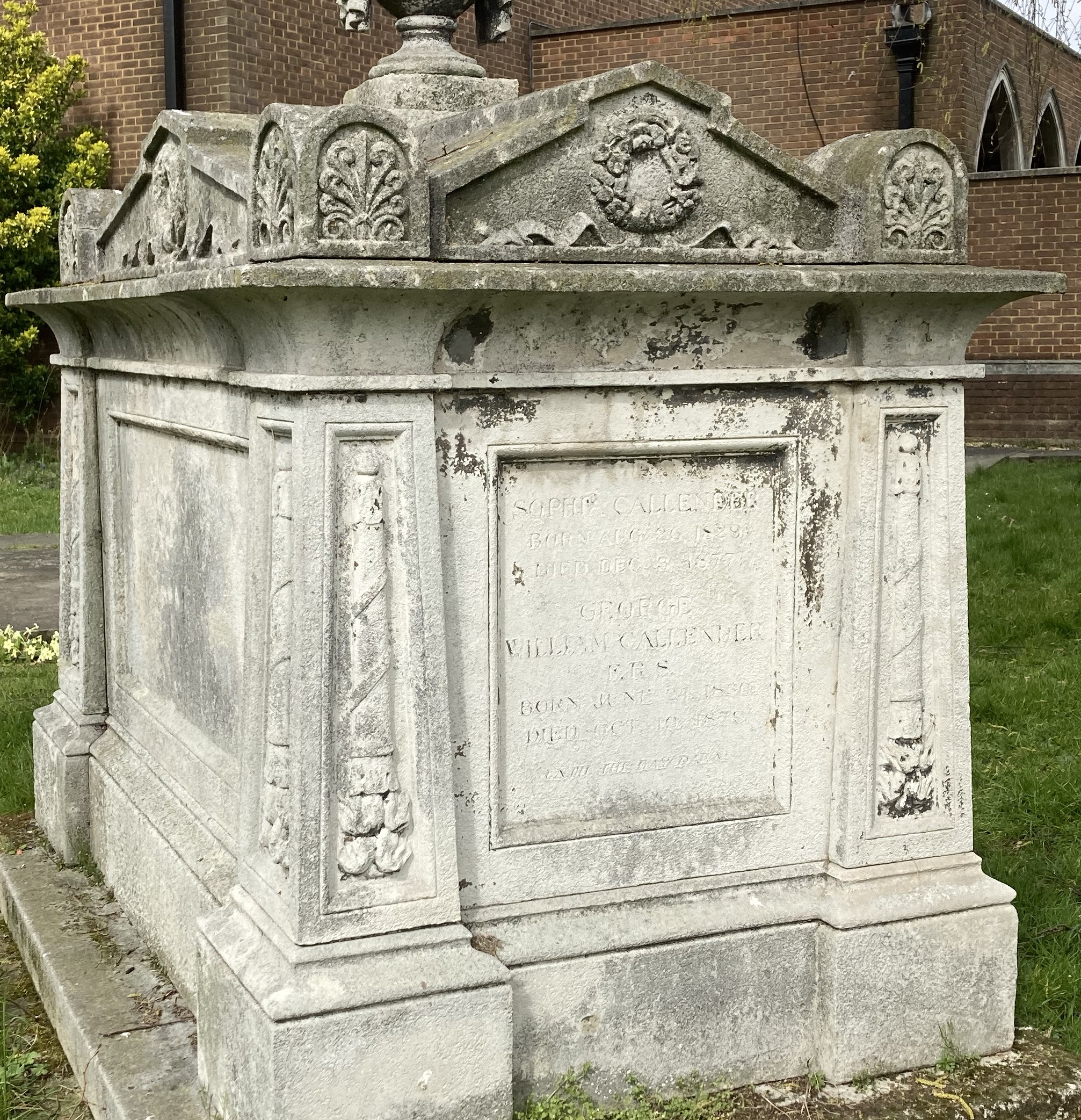
Grave of George William Callender in West Norwood Cemetery

Callender was born at Clifton, and, after education at a Bristol school, became a medical student at St. Bartholomew's Hospital in 1849. In 1852 he was a member of the Royal College of Surgeons, and a fellow in 1855.

Callnder was house-surgeon at St. Bartholomew's, was in 1861 elected assistant surgeon, and in 1871 surgeon to the hospital. At the same time he was a lateacher in the medical school, was registrar (1854), demonstrator of anatomy, lecturer on comparative anatomy and on anatomy (1865), and finally (1873) lecturer on surgery. For many years he was treasurer of the medical school.

Callender lived in Queen Anne Street, married Sophia Bousfield in 1859, and had several children. He died on 20 October 1879 of Bright's disease, at sea on his way back from America. He was buried at West Norwood Cemetery.

== Works ==
Callender published a paper on the Development of the Bones of the Face in Man in the Philosophical Transactions for 1869, which led to his election as Fellow of the Royal Society in 1871. In the Proceedings of the Royal Society there are abstracts of papers by him on the anatomy of the thyroid body and on the formation of the sub-axial arches of man. He also published papers in the Medico-Chirurgical Transactions, in the Transactions of the Clinical Society and of the Pathological Society, in the St. Bartholomew's Hospital Reports, in Timothy Holmes's System of Surgery, and in the medical journals. In 1863 he published a short book on the anatomy of the parts concerned in femoral rupture.

== Notes ==
Attribution

This article incorporates text from a publication now in the public domain: Stephen, Leslie, ed. (1886). "Callender, George William". Dictionary of National Biography. Vol. 8. London: Smith, Elder & Co.
