= List of fellows of the Royal Society M, N, O =

About 8,000 fellows have been elected to the Royal Society of London since its inception in 1660. Below is a list of people who are or were Fellow or Foreign Member of the Royal Society. The date of election to the fellowship follows the name. Dates in brackets relate to an award or event associated with the person. The Society maintains complete online list. This list is complete up to and including 2019.

List of Fellows and Foreign Members of the Royal Society
A, B, C	D, E, F	G, H, I	J, K, L	M, N, O	P, Q, R	S, T, U, V	W, X, Y, Z

== List of fellows ==
=== M ===
Name	Election date	Notes
Otto Maass	1940-03-14	8 July 1890 – 3 July 1961 Prof. of Physical Chemistry, Montreal
Alexander Macalister	1881-06-02	9 April 1844 – 2 September 1919
Archibald Byron Macallum	1906-05-03	10 April 1858 – 5 April 1934
Robert MacAndrew	1853-06-02	22 March 1801 – 22 May 1873
Justin Macarthy	1770-04-05	fl 1770
George Macartney, 1st Earl Macartney	1792-06-07	14 May 1737 – 31 March 1806
James Macartney	1811-02-21	8 March 1770 – 6 March 1843
Francis Sowerby Macaulay	1928-05-10	12 February 1862 – 9 February 1937
Thomas Babington Macaulay, Baron Macaulay	1849-11-22	25 October 1800 – 28 December 1859
Zachary Macaulay	1821-02-08	2 May 1768 – 13 May 1838
Forbes Macbean	1786-11-09	1725 – 11 November 1800
Ernest William MacBride	1905-05-11	12 December 1866 – 17 November 1940
James MacCullagh	1843-02-02	1809 – 24 October 1847
John MacCulloch	1820-05-18	6 October 1773 – 20 August 1835
Alan Graham MacDiarmid	2003-05-15	14 April 1927 – 7 February 2007
David Keith Chalmers Macdonald	1960-03-24	24 July 1920 – 28 July 1963 Physicist
Hector Munro Macdonald	1901-06-06	19 January 1865 – 16 May 1935
Ian Grant Macdonald	1979-03-15	11 October 1928 – 8 August 2023
James Ramsay MacDonald	1930-06-26	13 October 1866 – 9 November 1937 Statute
John MacDonald	1800-05-15	30 October 1759 – 16 August 1831 Military Engineer
John Denis Macdonald	1859-06-09	26 October 1826 – 7 February 1908 Surgeon
John Hay Athole Macdonald, Lord Kingsburgh	1888-05-03	28 December 1836 – 9 May 1919
John Smyth Macdonald	1917-05-03	28 April 1867 – 29 March 1941 Physiologist, Sheffield University
Georgina Mary Mace	2002-05-13	
William Mace	1745-05-23	17 December 1767
William Macewen	1895-06-13	22 June 1848 – 22 March 1924
Alexander MacFarlane	1747-02-19	23 August 1755 Judge, Jamaica
Robert Gwyn Macfarlane	1956-03-15	26 June 1907 – 26 March 1987
Alistair George James MacFarlane	1984-03-15	
James Gordon MacGregor	1900-06-14	31 March 1852 – 21 May 1913
John Machin	1710-11-30	9 June 1751
Charles Macintosh	1824-04-29	29 December 1766 – 25 July 1843
Frank Campbell MacIntosh	1954-03-18	24 December 1909 – 11 September 1992
Angus John Macintyre	1993-03-11	
Iain MacIntyre	1996-03-14	
George B. Mackaness	1976-03-18	20 August 1922 – 4 March 2007 Australian Microbiologist
Alan Lindsay Mackay	1988-03-17	
David John Cameron MacKay	2009-05-15	
George Mackay, 3rd Lord Reay	1698-11-09	1678 – 21 March 1748
Robert Sinclair MacKay	2000-05-11	
Trudy Frances Charlene Mackay	2006-05-18	
Andrew Mackenzie	2014-04-30	1956–
Andrew Peter Mackenzie	2015-05-01	1964 - Physicist
Chalmers Jack Mackenzie	1946-11-21	11 July 1888 – 26 February 1984
Charles Mackenzie	1815-06-01	fl 1815
Colin Mackenzie	1819-06-10	c. 1753 – 8 May 1821
Francis Humberston Mackenzie, 1st Baron Seaforth	1794-06-26	9 June 1754 – 11 January 1815
George Mackenzie, 1st Earl of Cromartie	1692-12-14	1630 – 17 August 1714
Sir George Steuart Mackenzie	1815-04-13	22 June 1780 – October 1848
James Mackenzie	1915-05-06	12 April 1853 – 26 January 1925
Kenneth Mackenzie, 1st Earl of Seaforth	1772-11-12	1744–1781
George Owen Mackie	1991-03-14	British biologist, Canada
John William Mackie	1817-05-15	c. 1788 – Chaplain to Duke of York
William Alexander Mackinnon	1827-06-14	2 August 1789 - 30 April 1870
Allan Roy Mackintosh	1991-03-14	22 January 1936 – 20 December 1995
James Mackintosh	1813-11-11	24 October 1765 – 30 May 1832
Nicholas John Mackintosh	1987-03-19	9 July 1935 - 8 February 2015 Psychologist
Gilbert Wakefield Mackmurdo	1839-05-30	c. 1788 – 26 August 1869
Sir Herbert Mackworth, 1st Baronet	1777-01-09	1 January 1737 – 25 October 1791 MP
Colin MacLaurin	1719-11-05	
Thomas Maclear	1831-12-08	17 March 1794 – 14 July 1879
David Herman MacLennan	1994-03-10	Canadian-born biochemist
Ian Calman Muir MacLennan	2012-04-19	
John James Rickard Macleod	1923-05-03	6 September 1876 – 16 March 1935
Norman Macleod	1791-03-24	4 March 1754 – General in Army
Percy Alexander MacMahon	1890-06-05	26 September 1854 – 25 December 1929
William Macmichael	1817-03-27	1784 – 10 January 1839
John (Jake) MacMillan	1978-03-16	13 September 1926 – 12 May 2014 Chemist
David W.C. MacMillan	2012-04-19	
Maurice Harold Macmillan	1962-05-31	10 February 1894 – 29 December 1986 Statute 12
John Benjamin Macneill	1838-04-05	c. 1793 – 2 March 1880
Enid Anne Campbell MacRobbie	1991-03-14	
James Ormiston MacWilliam	1848-06-09	1808 – 4 May 1862
John Alexander MacWilliam	1916-05-11	31 July 1857 – 13 January 1937
Paul Anthony Madden	2001-05-10	
Frederick Madden	1832-02-02	16 February 1801 - 08 Mar 1873
Ieuan Maddock	1967-03-16	29 March 1917 – 29 December 1988
John Royden Maddox	2000-05-11	Honorary
Simon Hugh Piper Maddrell	1981-03-19	
John Maddy	1817-06-12	c. 1765 – 17 June 1853
Scipione Maffei	1736-12-23	2 June 1675 – 11 February 1755
John Hyacinth de Magalhaens	1774-04-21	5 November 1722 – 7 February 1790
Lorenzo Magalotti	1709-05-04	? 23 October 1637 – ? 2 March 1711
William Magee, Archbishop of Dublin	1813-11-11	18 March 1766 – 18 August 1831
Philip D. Magnus	1985-03-21	
George Magrath	1819-06-24	1775 – 12 June 1857
Eleanor Anne Maguire	2016-04-29	27 March 1970 –
Lakshminarayanan Mahadevan	2016-04-29	
Prasanta Chandra Mahalanobis	1945-03-22	29 June 1893 – 28 June 1972
Panchanan Maheshwari	1965-03-18	9 November 1904 – 18 May 1966 Professor of Botany, Delhi Univ.
Kurt Mahler	1948-03-18	27 July 1903 – 25 February 1988, mathematician
Yadvinder Malhi	2017-05-05	
Charles Mahon, 3rd Earl Stanhope	1772-11-19	3 August 1753 – 15 December 1816
Philip Henry Mahon, 4th Earl Stanhope	1807-01-08	4 December 1781 – 2 March 1855
Philip Henry Mahon, 5th Earl Stanhope	1827-03-22	30 January 1805 – 24 December 1875
Yiu-Wing Mai	2008-05-16	
Joseph Henry Maiden	1916-05-11	25 April 1859 – 16 November 1925
John Paul Maier	1999-05-13	
Robert Main	1860-06-07	12 July 1808 – 9 May 1878
Henry James Sumner Maine	1874-06-04	15 August 1822 – 03
Philip Maini	2015-05-01	1959-10-16 - Professor of Mathematical Biology
Ravinder Nath Maini	2007-05-17	
Robert James Mair	2007-05-17	
Ebenezer Fuller Maitland	1829-03-28	c. 1780 – 1 November 1858 Landowner, MP for Wallingford
John Gorham Maitland	1847-04-15	1818 – 27 April 1863 Barrister & civil servant
Samuel Roffey Maitland	1839-04-18	7 January 1792 – 19 January 1866 clergyman
William Maitland	1733-04-12	c. 1693 – 16 July 1757 Historian, Writer
Peter Michael Maitlis	1984-03-15	
Montague Maizels	1961-03-16	30 September 1899 – 10 February 1976
Ashhurst Majendie	1821-06-28	24 April 1784 – 7 October 1867
John James Majendie	1768-04-14	1709 – 7 August 1783 Clergyman
Lewis Majendie	1794-07-03	1838 Army Officer & Antiquary
Charles Immanuel Forsyth Major	1908-05-07	15 August 1843 – 25 March 1923
Tak Wah Mak	1994-03-10	
Roger Mellor Makins, 1st Baron Sherfield	1986-06-26	3 February 1904 – 9 February 1996
John Malcolm	1824-02-26	2 May 1769 – 30 April 1833
John Grant Malcolmson	1840-04-30	17 November 1802 – 23 March 1844 geologist
John Christian Malet	1882-06-08	25 December 1847 – 9 April 1901 Prof of Mathematics, Queens College, Cork
Charles Warre Malet	1806-01-23	? 1753 – 15 December 1815 Diplomat, Governor of Bombay
Michael Henry Malim	2007-05-17	
John William Mallet	1877-06-07	10 October 1832 – 7 November 1912
Robert Mallet	1854-06-01	3 June 1810 – 5 November 1881
John Malliet	1767-04-02	1786
Henry Reginald Arnulph Mallock	1903-06-11	12 March 1851 – 26 June 1933 Mechanic
Paul Jacques Malouin	1753-03-01	29 June 1701 – ? 31 December 1777
Marcello Malpighi	1669-03-04	10 March 1628 – ? 30 November 1694
Edward Maltby	1824-02-19	6 April 1770 – 3 July 1859
Thomas Robert Malthus	1818-03-05	? 17 February 1766 – 23 December 1834
Jean Paul de Gua de Malves	1743-03-10	c. 1714 – 2 June 1785
Charles Manby	1853-06-02	5 February 1804 – 31 July 1884
George William Manby	1831-05-12	28 November 1765 – 18 November 1854
Joel Mandelstam	1971-03-18	
Stanley Mandelstam	1962-03-15	theoretical physicist
Lewis Norman Mander	1990-03-15	
Xaverius Manetti	1756-11-11	1723 – 19 November 1785
Eustachio Manfredi	1728-10-24	20 September 1674 – 15 February 1739
James Mangles	1825-01-20	1786 – 18 November 1867 Royal Navy
Frederick George Mann	1947-03-20	29 June 1897 – 29 March 1982
Nicholas Mann	1738-01-26	24 November 1753 Antiquary
Stephen Mann	2003-05-15	
Thaddeus Robert Rudolph Mann	1951-03-15	4 December 1908 – 27 November 1993
Theodore Augustine Mann	1788-04-03	22 June 1735 – 23 February 1809
Ian Manners	2011-05-19	
Owen Manning	1767-12-10	11 August 1721 – 9 September 1801 Vicar of Godalming
Richard Manningham	1720-03-10	1690 – 11 May 1759
David Eusthatios Manolopoulos	2011-05-19	
Anton Adam Mansberg	1727-03-09	fl 1727
James Mansergh	1901-06-06	29 April 1834 – 15 June 1905
Eric Harold Mansfield	1971-03-18	
Peter Mansfield	1987-03-19	
Terence Arthur Mansfield	1987-03-19	
Patrick Manson	1900-06-14	3 October 1844 – 9 April 1922
Gideon Algernon Mantell	1825-11-24	4 February 1790 – 10 November 1852
Ernst Christoph von Manteuffel	1748-03-24	1676 – 30 January 1749
Irene Manton	1961-03-16	17 April 1904 – 31 May 1988
Nicholas Stephen Manton	1996-03-14	
Sidnie Milana Manton	1948-03-18	4 May 1902 – 2 January 1979
John Mapletoft	1676-02-10	15 June 1631 – 10 November 1721
Leslie William Mapson	1969-03-20	17 November 1907 – 3 December 1970
Richard Marais	2018-05-09	
Alexander John Gaspard Marcet	1808-06-02	1770 – 19 October 1822
Francis Marcet	1836-01-28	25 May 1803 – 12 April 1883
William Marcet	1857-06-11	13 May 1828 – 4 March 1900
Alfred Le Marchant	1819-11-25	fl 1819
Giovanni Giacomo Marinoni	1746-03-20	1676 – 10 January 1755
Leo Edmond Marion	1961-03-16	22 March 1899 – 16 July 1979
Roy Markham	1956-03-15	29 January 1916 – 16 November 1979
Clements Robert Markham	1873-06-12	20 July 1830 – 30 January 1916
George Markham	1708-04-07	1666 – 16 June 1736 Barrister
James Heywood Markland	1816-03-28	7 December 1788 – 28 December 1864
Vladimir Markovic	2014-04-30	Mathematician, California Institute of Technology
Paul Jacob Marperger	1715-06-09	3 October 1683 – 20 November 1767
Jens Marklof	2015-05-01	German mathematician
John Edward Marr	1891-06-04	14 June 1857 – 1 October 1933
Philippa Charlotte Marrack	1997-05-15	
Guy Frederic Marrian	1944-03-16	3 March 1904 – 24 July 1981
Frederick Marryat	1819-05-13	10 July 1792 – 9 August 1848
Charles David Marsden	1983-03-17	15 April 1938 – 29 September 1998
Jerrold Eldon Marsden	2006-05-18	17 August 1942 – 21 September 2010 Prof of Engineering, Caltech
Ernest Marsden	1946-03-21	20 February 1889 – ? 14 December 1970 Fellow 1946-03-21
William Marsden	1783-01-23	16 November 1754 – 6 October 1836
Herbert Marsh, Bishop of Peterborough	1801-01-08	10 December 1757 – 1 May 1839
James Ernest Marsh	1906-05-03	5 July 1860 – 13 April 1938 Chemist
Arthur Milnes Marshall	1885-06-04	8 June 1852 – 31 December 1893
Barry James Marshall	1999-05-13	
Christopher John Marshall	1995-03-09	
Francis Hugh Adam Marshall	1920-05-13	11 July 1878 – 5 February 1949
Guy Anstruther Knox Marshall	1923-05-03	20 December 1871 – 8 April 1959
Hugh Marshall	1904-05-05	7 January 1868 – 6 September 1913
John Marshall	1857-06-11	11 September 1818 – 1 January 1891 Surgeon
John Charles Marshall	2008-05-16	
Norman Bertram Marshall	1970-03-19	6 February 1915 – 13 February 1996 Zoologist
Robin Marshall	1995-03-09	
Sheina Macalister Marshall	1963-03-21	20 April 1896 – 7 April 1977
Walter Charles Marshall, Baron Marshall of Goring	1971-03-18	6 March 1932 – 20 February 1996
Charles Marsham, 1st Earl of Romney	1776-03-14	28 September 1744 – 1 March 1811
Robert Marsham	1780-03-09	c. 1707 – 4 September 1797
Robert Marsham, 1st Baron Romney	1723-11-21	17 September 1685 – 28 November 1724
Robert Marsham, 2nd Baron Romney	1757-05-19	22 August 1717 – 16 November 1793
Thomas Nelson Marsham	1986-03-20	10 November 1923 – 12 October 1989
Luigi Ferdinand, Count Marsigli	1691-11-25	? 10 July 1658 – 1 November 1730
Giovanni Marsili	1758-04-06	1773
Hedley Ralph Marston	1949-03-17	26 August 1900 – 25 August 1965
Robert A. Martienssen	2006-05-18	
Alan Douglas Martin	2004-05-27	
Archer John Porter Martin	1950-03-16	1 March 1910 – 28 July 2002
Cathie Martin	2018-05-09	1955
Charles James Martin	1901-06-06	10 January 1866 – 15 February 1955
George Steven Martin	1998-05-14	
Henry Newell Martin	1885-06-04	1 July 1848 – 27 October 1896
James Ranald Martin	1845-02-13	1793 – 27 November 1874
Leslie Harold Martin	1957-03-21	22 December 1900 – 1 February 1983
Matthew Martin	1794-07-10	1748 – 20 November 1838 Merchant of Exeter
Sidney Harris Cox Martin	1895-06-13	8 April 1860 – 22 September 1924
Thomas John Martin	2000-05-11	
George Martine	1740-12-11	1700 – ? April 1741
David Forbes Martyn	1950-03-16	27 June 1906 – 5 March 1970
John Martyn	1727-03-30	12 September 1699 – 29 January 1768
Thomas Martyn	1786-05-18	23 September 1735 – 3 June 1825
Martin van Marum	1798-04-19	20 March 1750 – 26 December 1837
Francis Maseres	1771-05-02	15 December 1731 – 19 May 1824
Raghunath Anant Mashelkar	1998-05-14	
Ernest John Maskell	1939-03-16	2 February 1895 – 20 December 1958
Nevil Maskelyne	1758-04-27	6 October 1732 – 9 February 1811
Basil John Mason	1965-03-18	
Charles Mason	1742-06-24	c. 1699 – 18 December 1771 Clergyman, Geologist
Paul James Mason	1995-03-09	
Ronald Mason	1975-03-20	Prof of Chemistry, Sussex University
Stephen Finney Mason	1982-03-18	Physical Chemist
Thomas Godfrey Mason	1937-05-06	24 July 1890 – 22 October 1959 Plant physiologist, Trinidad
David William Masser	2005-05-26	
Victor Ame Philippe Ferrero de Fiesque Masseran	1770-01-11	1777
Richard Myddleton Massey	1712-10-23	c. 1678 – 27 March 1743
Harrie Stewart Wilson Massey	1940-03-14	16 May 1908 – 27 November 1983
Vincent Massey	1977-03-17	28 November 1926 – 26 August 2002
Jean Masson	1743-12-08	fl 1743 Chevalier de Besse
David Orme Masson	1903-06-11	13 January 1858 – 10 August 1937
James Irvine Orme Masson	1939-03-16	3 September 1887 – 22 October 1962
Arthur Thomas Masterman	1915-05-06	10 April 1869 – 10 February 1941 Fellow 1915-05-06
Maxwell Tylden Masters	1870-06-02	15 April 1833 – 30 May 1907
Thomas Guy Masters	2005-05-26	
Yoshio Masui	1998-05-14	
Antonio Matani	1763-03-10	27 July 1730 – 21 June 1779
Gerhard Theodor Materlik	2011-05-19	
Cotton Mather	1713-07-27	13 February 1663 – 13 February 1728
Robert Mather	1729-05-08	c. 1700 – 6 January 1730
Kenneth Mather	1949-03-17	22 June 1911 – 21 March 1990
Thomas Mather	1902-06-05	15 December 1856 – 23 June 1937
Nicholas James Sutherland Matheson	1846-02-19	1796 – 31 December 1878 Jardine Matheson Bank
William Mathew	1720-03-10	30 September 1752
George Ballard Mathews	1897-06-03	24 February 1861 – 19 March 1922
Thomas James Mathias	1795-03-19	? 1754 – August 1835
William George Maton	1800-06-26	31 January 1774 – 30 March 1835
Iain William Mattaj	1999-05-13	
William Diller Matthew	1919-05-15	20 February 1871 – 24 September 1930
Drummond Hoyle Matthews	1974-03-21	6 February 1931 – 20 July 1997
Leonard Harrison Matthews	1954-03-18	12 June 1901 – 27 November 1986
Paul Taunton Matthews	1963-03-21	20 November 1919 – 26 February 1987
Peter Bryan Conrad Matthews	1973-03-15	
Richard Ellis Ford Matthews	1974-03-21	
Bryan Harold Cabot Matthews	1940-03-14	14 June 1906 – 22 July 1986
Philip Matthews	1671-03-23	c. 1642 – ? December 1685
George Matthey	1879-06-12	9 May 1825 – 14 February 1913 Refiner, Johnson & Matthey
Augustus Matthiessen	1861-06-06	2 January 1831 – 6 October 1870
Matthew Maty	1751-12-19	17 May 1718 – 2 July 1776
Paul Henry Maty	1771-05-16	1745 – 16 January 1787
John Maud	1738-04-20	8 June 1782 Chemist
Israel Mauduit	1751-06-13	1708 – 14 June 1787
Pierre Louis Moreau de Maupertuis	1728-06-27	? 17 July 1698 – 27 July 1759
Douglas Mawson	1923-05-03	5 May 1882 – ? 15 October 1958
King of Bavaria, Maximilian I	1802-03-04	27 May 1756 – 13 October 1825 Royal
Joseph Maximilian, Archduke of Austria	1819-01-21	1782–1863 Royal
James Clerk Maxwell	1861-06-06	13 June 1831 – 5 November 1879, physicist
James Rankin Maxwell	1997-05-15	
Herbert Eustace Maxwell	1898-01-27	8 January 1845 – 30 October 1937
John Maxwell	1829-02-26	12 May 1791 – 6 June 1865
Murray Maxwell	1819-02-18	10 September 1775 – 26 June 1831
Charles May	1854-06-01	1800 – 10 August 1860 Civil engineer
Michael David May	1991-03-14	
Robert McCredie May, Baron May of Oxford	1979-03-15	
Christian Mayer	1765-12-19	20 August 1719 – ? 16 April 1783
David Quinn Mayne	1985-03-21	
John Thomas Mayne	1818-01-29	fl 1818
William Valentine Mayneord	1965-03-18	15 February 1902 – 10 August 1988
Mark Mayer	2019-04-16	
Charles Mayo	1827-03-01	24 March 1767 – 10 December 1858 Prof. of Anglo-Saxon, Oxford
Herbert Mayo	1828-04-17	? 3 April 1796 – 15 May 1852
Paul Jose de Mayo	1975-03-20	8 August 1924 – 26 July 1994
Thomas Mayo	1835-06-04	24 January 1790 – 13 January 1871
John Mayow	1678-11-30	24 May 1640 – October 1679
Guillaume Mazeas	1752-05-28	2 August 1720 – 13 September 1775
James William McBain	1923-05-03	22 March 1882 – 12 March 1953
Alex McBratney	2026-05-27	
Robert Alexander McCance	1948-03-18	9 December 1898 – 5 March 1993
Andrew McCance	1943-03-18	30 March 1889 – 11 June 1983
John Vincent McCanny	2002-05-09	
Frank McClean	1895-06-13	13 November 1837 – 8 November 1904
John Robinson McClean	1869-06-03	1813 – 13 July 1873
John Alexander McClelland	1909-05-06	1 December 1870 – 13 April 1920
Sir Francis Leopold McClintock	1865-06-01	8 July 1819 – 17 November 1907
James Desmond Caldwell McConnell	1987-03-19	3 July 1930 – 2 January 2026
Francis Patrick McCormick	1996-03-14	
William Symington McCormick	1928-06-21	30 April 1859 – 23 March 1930 Statute
Frederick McCoy	1880-06-03	1823 – ? 13 May 1899
William Hunter McCrea	1952-03-20	13 December 1904 – 25 April 1999
Peter McCullagh	1994-03-10	
Ernest A McCulloch	1999-05-13	
Malcolm Thomas McCulloch	2010-05-20	
Arthur Bruce McDonald	2009-05-15	
Robert McDonnell	1865-06-01	15 March 1828 – 6 May 1889 Surgeon
Trevor John McDougall	2012-04-19	
William McDougall	1912-05-02	22 June 1871 – 28 November 1938
Dusa McDuff	1994-03-10	
James Dwyer McGee	1966-03-17	17 December 1903 – 28 February 1987 Physicist
Simon McGillivray	1838-03-29	9 June 1840
Ian Alexander McGregor	1981-03-19	26 August 1922 – 1 February 2007 Immunologist
James McGrigor	1816-03-14	9 April 1771 – 2 April 1858
William Carmichael McIntosh	1877-06-07	10 October 1838 – 1 April 1931
Michael Edgeworth McIntyre	1990-03-15	1939-7 July 2022
John Gray McKendrick	1884-06-12	12 August 1841 – 2 January 1926
Alexander McKenzie	1916-05-11	6 December 1869 – 11 June 1951 Prof of Chemistry, Univ College, Dundee
Andrew N. J. McKenzie	2017-05-05	
Dan Peter McKenzie	1976-03-18	
Murdoch McKenzie	1774-05-19	? October 1797
James McKernan	2011-05-19	1964-
Thomas Fulton Wilson McKillop	2005-05-26	CEO, AstroZeneca
Gareth H. McKinley	2019-04-16	
Andrew David McLachlan	1989-03-16	
Robert McLachlan	1877-06-07	10 April 1837 – 23 May 1904 Botanist & Entomologist
Anne Laura McLaren	1975-03-20	biologist, Foreign Secretary for the Royal Society (1991-6)
Digby Johns McLaren	1979-03-15	11 December 1919 – 8 December 2004
Keith Alan McLauchlan	1992-03-12	
Angela McLean	2009-05-15	
Irwin McLean	2014-04-30	Geneticist, Dundee University
Alexander McLeay	1809-01-19	24 June 1767 – 18 July 1848
John Cunningham McLennan	1915-05-06	14 April 1867 – 9 October 1935
Thomas Charles Buckland McLeish	2011	
Herbert McLeod	1881-06-02	20 February 1841 – 1 October 1923 Chemist, Royal Indian Eng.Coll.
James Walter McLeod	1933-05-11	2 January 1887 – 11 March 1978 Prof. of Bacteriology
John Bryce McLeod	1992-03-12	
Andrew Paul McMahon	2007-05-17	
Charles Alexander McMahon	1898-06-09	24 March 1830 – 21 February 1904 Geologist
Harvey Thomas McMahon	2008-05-16	Molecular Biologist, Cambridge
Andrew James McMichael	1992-03-12	Molecular Biologist, MRC
John McMichael	1957-03-21	25 July 1904 – 3 March 1993
David Roberts McMurtry	2011-05-19	
John Michael McNamara	2012-04-19	
James McFadyen McNeill	1949-03-17	19 August 1892 – 24 July 1964
Bryan Austin McSwiney	1944-03-16	20 May 1894 – 8 March 1947
Gilean Alistair Tristram McVean	2016-04-29	
John Graham McWhirter	1999-05-13	
Richard Mead	1703-11-30	11 August 1673 – 16 February 1754
Samuel Mead	1739-03-08	11 October 1776
Thomas Wilson Meade	1996-03-14	
Pierre François Andre Méchain	1789-04-30	? 16 April 1744 – ? 20 September 1805
Peter Brian Medawar	1949-03-17	28 February 1915 – 2 October 1987
Henry Benedict Medlicott	1877-06-07	3 August 1829 – 6 April 1905
Gerard Meerman	1760-04-24	6 December 1722 – 15 December 1771
Charles Edward Kenneth Mees	1939-03-16	26 May 1882 – 15 August 1960
Goverdhan Mehta	2005-05-26	
Raphael Meldola	1886-06-04	19 July 1849 – 16 November 1915, chemist
Charles Meldrum	1876-06-01	19 October 1821 – 28 August 1901
John Mellanby	1929-05-02	12 June 1878 – 15 July 1939
Edward Mellanby	1925-05-07	8 April 1884 – 30 January 1955
Pierre de Mellarede	1713-06-11	c. 1659 – 19 March 1730
Martinho de Mello e Castro	1757-04-21	fl 1757
Sebastian Joseph de Carvalho e Marquis of Pombal Mello	1740-05-15	13 May 1699 – 8 May 1782
Joseph William Mellor	1927-05-12	9 July 1869 – 24 May 1938
James Cosmo Melvill	1841-01-14	1792 – 23 July 1861 Secretary to East India Co
Robert Melvill	1775-02-16	12 October 1723 – 29 August 1809 General in British Army
Alexander Melville	1827-02-01	14 October 1790 – 16 September 1840 Supt East India Co Mint
Harry Work Melville	1941-03-20	27 April 1908 – 15 June 2000 Professor of Chemistry
Bruno Mendel	1957-03-21	3 November 1897 – 23 August 1959
Kurt Alfred Georg Mendelssohn	1951-03-15	7 January 1906 – 18 September 1980, German-born British medical physicist cryogenic engineering
Diego de Mendoca	1736-02-05	fl 1736
Joseph Mendoza y Rios	1793-04-11	? 15 September 1762 – ? 3 March 1815
Francisco Xavier de Menezes	1738-11-02	fl 1738
Johann Burchard Menkenius	1699-11-30	27 March 1675 – 1 April 1732
Mambillikalathil Govind Kumar Menon	1970-03-19	
James Woodham Menter	1966-03-17	22 August 1921 – 18 July 2006
Alexander Danilovich Menzicoff	1714-07-29	? 1673 – ? 12 November 1729
Robert Gordon Menzies	1965-06-03	20 December 1894 – 15 May 1978, twelfth Prime Minister of Australia
Nicholas Mercator	1666-11-14	c. 1620 – ? February 1687
Frank Brian Mercer	1984-03-15	22 December 1927 – 22 November 1998
James Mercer	1922-05-11	15 January 1883 – 21 February 1932
John Mercer	1852-06-03	22 February 1791 – 30 November 1866
Roger Meredith	1681-04-06	1637 – 17 February 1701
William George Meredith	1830-03-18	c. 1804 – August 1831
John Meres	1724-03-12	1726 Apothecary
John Meres	1719-03-12	22 February 1736
Thomas Meres	1686-12-08	c. 1662 -
John Merewether	1838-05-03	1797 – 4 April 1850
Christopher Merrett	1663-05-20	? 16 February 1614 – 19 August 1695 Original Fellow 1664-05-20
Charles Watkins Merrifield	1863-06-04	20 October 1827 – 1 January 1884
John Merrill	1745-03-21	fl 1745 Mathematician
Alexander Walter Merrison	1969-03-20	21 March 1924 – 19 February 1989
Patrick Anthony Merton	1979-03-15	8 October 1920 – 13 June 2000
Thomas Ralph Merton	1920-05-13	12 January 1888 – 10 October 1969
Rudolf Messel	1912-05-02	14 January 1848 – 18 April 1920
Charles Messier	1764-12-06	26 June 1730 – ? 12 April 1817
Leon Mestel	1977-03-17	astronomer
Donald Metcalf	1983-03-17	
Philip Metcalfe	1790-11-04	c. 1733 – 26 August 1818
Friedrich Christian Meuschen	1764-04-05	1719 -
Edward Meyrick	1904-05-05	24 November 1854 – 31 March 1938
James Meyrick	1800-06-19	? 1748 – 27 November 1818
Owen Putland Meyrick	1776-05-09	c. 1752 – 24 March 1825
Louis Compton Miall	1892-06-02	13 September 1842 – 21 February 1921
John David Michaelis	1789-04-30	1717 – 22 August 1791
Anthony George Maldon Michell	1934-05-03	21 June 1870 – 17 February 1959
John Michell	1760-06-12	1724 – 21 April 1793
John Henry Michell	1902-06-05	26 October 1863 – 3 February 1940
Richard Michell	1774-05-12	1728–1789
Robert Hall Michell	1986-03-20	
Pietro Antonio Michelotti	1718-12-11	1680 – 1 January 1740
James Mickleton	1718-07-03	fl 1718
Charles Stewart Middlemiss	1921-05-12	22 November 1859 – 11 June 1945
Benjamin Middleton	1687-12-14	fl 1668–1712
Christopher Middleton	1737-04-07	12 February 1770
Thomas Hudson Middleton	1936-06-25	32 August 1863 – 14 May 1943 Statute Bishop of Calcutta
Thomas Fanshawe Middleton	1814-05-19	26 January 1769 – 8 July 1822
Paul Midgley	2014-04-30	Materials Scientist, Cambridge University
John Edwin Midwinter	1985-03-21	Prof of Electronic Eng, University College, London
John Miers	1843-03-09	25 August 1789 – 17 October 1879
Henry Alexander Miers	1896-06-04	25 May 1858 – 10 December 1942
Gero Miesenböck	2015-05-01	1965-07-15 - Neuroscientist
Gerard James Milburn	2017-05-05	
Ricardo Miledi	1970-03-19	
Arnold Ashley Miles	1961-03-16	21 March 1904 – 11 February 1988 Fellow 1961-03-16
Henry Miles	1743-06-09	3 June 1698 – 10 February 1763
Mervyn John Miles	2011-05-19	
Thomas Miles	1722-03-15	9 December 1767 Clergyman & Headmaster
Andrew Millar (scientist)	2012-04-19	
David Andrew Barclay Miller	1995-03-09	
Frederick Robert Miller	1932-05-05	2 May 1881 – 11 November 1967 Prof of Physiology, Univ of W.Ontario
George Miller	1827-05-24	? November 1849 Lt-Col in Army
Jacques Francis Albert Pierre Miller	1970-03-19	
John Fletcher Miller	1850-06-06	20 June 1816 – 14 July 1856
Joseph Miller	1843-03-30	? 1798 – 23 February 1860 Marine Engineer
Philip Miller	1730-01-22	1691 – 18 December 1771
Roger Ervin Miller	2005-05-26	
Stewart Crichton Miller	1996-03-14	2 July 1934 – 7 August 1999
William Allen Miller	1845-02-06	17 December 1817 – 30 September 1870
William Hallowes Miller	1838-02-08	6 April 1801 – 20 May 1880
Daniel Milles	1675-01-14	1626–1689
Edward Milles	1746-06-19	7 February 1776 Fellow 1747-06-19
Jeremiah Milles	1775-02-23	c. 1751 – ? November 1796
Jeremiah Milles	1742-04-01	c. 1714 – 13 February 1784
Thomas Milles	1708-04-07	19 June 1671 – 13 May 1740
Langford Millington	1802-05-06	9 May 1807
Abraham Mills	1799-05-30	c. 1750 – 2 March 1828 Mineralogist
Anne Mills	2013-05-02	
Bernard Yarnton Mills	1963-03-21	
Edmund James Mills	1874-06-04	8 December 1840 – 21 April 1921
Ian Mark Mills	1996-03-14	
John Mills	1766-02-13	c. 1717 – ? 1796
Walter Mills	1682-07-12	1654 – 7 January 1726 Physician
William Hobson Mills	1923-05-03	6 July 1873 – 22 February 1959
Francis Milman	1772-05-07	31 August 1746 – 24 June 1821
Edward Arthur Milne	1926-05-06	15 February 1896 – 21 September 1950
John Milne	1887-06-09	30 December 1850 – ? 30 July 1913
Malcolm Davenport Milne	1978-03-16	22 May 1915 – 3 April 1991
Arthur David Milner	2011-05-19	
Arthur John Robin Gorell Milner	1988-03-17	13 January 1934 – 20 March 2010 Computer Scientist, Cambridge
Brenda Atkinson Milner	1979-03-15	
Isaac Milner	1780-06-15	11 January 1750 – 1 April 1820
Samuel Roslington Milner	1922-05-11	22 August 1875 – 12 August 1958
Richard Monckton Milnes, 1st Baron Houghton	1868-12-10	19 June 1809 – 11 August 1885
César Milstein	1975-03-20	8 October 1927 – 24 March 2002, medicine, Nobel Prize (1984)
Edward Milward	1742-01-14	c. 1712 – 26 August 1757
Edward Alfred Minchin	1911-05-04	22 February 1866 – 30 September 1915
George Minchin Minchin	1895-06-13	25 May 1845 – 23 March 1914
Daniel Minet	1767-06-18	25 January 1790
David Michael Patrick Mingos	1992-03-12	
Andrew Mitchell	1736-02-26	15 April 1708 – 28 January 1771 Diplomat
Edgar William John Mitchell	1986-03-20	25 September 1925 – 30 October 2002
George Francis Mitchell	1973-03-15	15 October 1912 – 25 November 1997
George Hoole Mitchell	1953-03-19	31 December 1902 – 11 March 1976
John Mitchell	1748-12-15	14 April 1711 – 29 February 1768
John Francis Brake Mitchell	2004-05-27	
John Wesley Mitchell	1956-03-15	NZ physicist
Joseph Stanley Mitchell	1952-03-20	22 July 1909 – 22 February 1987
Peter Chalmers Mitchell	1906-05-03	23 November 1864 – 2 July 1945
Peter Dennis Mitchell	1974-03-21	29 September 1920 – 10 April 1992
John Murdoch Mitchison	1978-03-16	15 June 1922 – 17 March 2011
Nicholas Avrion Mitchison	1967-03-16	
Timothy John Mitchison	1997-05-15	
William Mitford	1749-04-13	1787 Clerk of Chancery Court
Ashesh Prosad Mitra	1988-03-17	
Sisir Kumar Mitra	1958-03-20	24 October 1890 – 13 August 1963
St. George Jackson Mivart	1869-06-03	30 November 1827 – 1 April 1900
Henry Keith Moffatt	1986-03-20	
James Reid Moir	1937-05-06	13 June 1879 – 24 February 1944 Archaeologist
Abraham de Moivre	1697-11-30	26 May 1667 – 27 November 1754
Coote Molesworth	1731-03-18	? 1695 – 29 November 1782
Richard Molesworth	1786-05-04	1737 – 29 September 1799
Richard Molesworth, 3rd Viscount Molesworth	1722-03-15	1680 – 12 October 1758
Robert Molesworth, 1st Viscount Molesworth	1698-03-23	7 September 1656 – 22 May 1725
William Molesworth	1835-11-26	23 May 1810 – 22 October 1855
Pietro Paolo Molinelli	1749-04-20	2 March 1702 – 11 October 1764
Patrick Loudon Mollison	1968-03-21	17 March 1914 – 26 November 2011 Haematologist
John Dixon Mollon	1999-05-13	
Adam Gottlob Moltke	1764-04-05	10 November 1710 – 25 September 1792
Daniel Molyneux	1736-02-19	1708–1738
Samuel Molyneux	1712-12-01	? 16 July 1689 – 13 April 1728
Thomas Molyneux	1686-11-03	14 April 1661 – 19 October 1733
William Molyneux	1686-02-03	17 April 1656 – 11 October 1698
Salvador Moncada	1988-03-17	
Andre Monceaux	1670-12-15	fl 1670
George Monck, 1st Duke of Albemarle	1665-01-09	6 December 1608 – 3 January 1670
Alexander Moncrieff	1871-06-08	17 April 1829 – 3 August 1906 Military Engineer
Alfred Moritz Mond, 1st Baron Melchett	1928-06-21	24 October 1868 – 27 December 1930 Statute, chemist
Ludwig Mond	1891-06-04	7 March 1839 – 11 December 1909, 1928, chemist
Robert Ludwig Mond	1938-03-17	9 September 1867 – 22 October 1938, chemist and archaeologist
William Taylor Money	1818-06-11	July 1834
Louis Guillaume Le Monnier	1745-02-07	27 June 1717 – 7 September 1799
Pierre Charles Le Monnier	1739-04-05	20 November 1715 – ? 31 May 1799
Alexander Monro	1723-06-27	8 September 1697 – 10 July 1767
Charles Monro	1821-05-17	c. 1757 – 25 September 1821
Donald Monro	1766-04-24	15 January 1728 – 9 June 1802
James Monson	1684-11-12	c. 1660 – ? 1688
Joseph de Montagny	1739-06-07	fl 1739
Charles Montagu, 1st Earl of Halifax	1695-11-30	16 April 1661 – 19 May 1715 Statute 12
Edward Montagu	1745-12-12	1775
Edward Wortley Montagu	1750-05-31	1713 – 29 April 1776
Edward Montagu, 1st Earl of Sandwich	1663-05-20	27 July 1625 – 28 May 1672 Original
Edward Montagu, 2nd Earl of Manchester	1665-05-10	1602 – 5 May 1671
Frederick Montagu	1792-02-16	July 1733 – 30 July 1800
George Montagu, 1st Duke of Montagu, 2nd creation	1749-12-07	26 July 1712 – 23 May 1790
John Montagu, 2nd Duke of Montagu	1718-03-13	29 March 1690 – 6 July 1749
John Montagu, 4th Earl of Sandwich	1740-03-20	3 November 1718 – 30 April 1792
Matthew Montagu	1795-03-05	fl 1795
Nicholas de Montaudouin	1749-02-16	fl 1749
Marques de Monte Leone	1716-04-05	fl 1716–1718
Moses Haim Montefiore	1836-06-16	24 October 1784 – 28 July 1885
John Lennox Monteith	1971-03-18	3 September 1929 - 20 July 2012 Physicist
William Monteith	1845-02-13	22 June 1790 – 18 April 1864
Charles de Secondat Montesquieu	1730-02-26	18 January 1689 – 10 February 1755
Jean Baptiste Montesquieu	1744-12-06	10 December 1716 – 1796
Thomas George Montgomerie	1872-06-06	23 April 1830 – 31 January 1878
Charles Daniel Trudaine De Montigny	1766-01-23	3 January 1703 – 19 January 1769
Conde de Montijo	1732-11-16	fl.1732
Pierre Remond de Montmort	1715-06-09	27 October 1678 – 7 October 1719
Antoine Jean Baptiste Robert Auget Montyon, Baron de Montyon	1812-11-05	26 December 1733 – 29 December 1820
Philip Burton Moon	1947-03-20	17 May 1907 – 9 October 1994
Edward Moor	1806-05-01	1771 – 26 February 1848
Robert Michael Moor	1994-03-10	
Stephen Erwin Moorbath	1977-03-17	
Benjamin Moore	1912-05-02	14 January 1867 – 3 March 1922
Brian Cecil Joseph Moore	2002-05-09	Prof of Auditory Perception, Cambridge
Charles Moore	1768-02-25	c. 1722 – 18 May 1775 antiquary
Daniel Moore	1810-06-28	c. 1760 – 6 January 1828 barrister
Derek William Moore	1990-03-15	Prof of Maths, Imperial College
George Moore	1835-04-02	c. 1777 – 8 November 1859
John Moore	1715-11-10	fl 1715–1734
John Arthur Moore	1846-02-26	1791 – 7 July 1860 Major, East India Co.
John Carrick Moore	1856-06-05	14 February 1805 – 12 February 1898
Michael Arthur Moore	1989-03-16	
Jonas Moore	1680-03-12	? 1681 Surveyor-general of Ordnance (son)
Jonas Moore	1674-12-03	9 February 1617 – 25 August 1679 Surveyor-general of Ordnance (father)
Patrick Alfred Caldwell Moore	2001-05-10	4 March 1923 – 9 December 2012 Honorary
Stephen Moore, 3rd Earl Mount Cashell	1847-04-22	20 May 1792 – 10 October 1883
Thomas Edward Lawes Moore	1854-06-01	1819 – 1 May 1872 Naval (magnetic) surveyor
Patrick Alfred Pierce Moran	1975-03-20	14 July 1917 – 19 September 1988
Jean François Clement Morand	1769-06-01	28 April 1726 – 13 August 1784
Sauveur François Morand	1729-01-09	2 April 1697 – 21 July 1773
Robert Moray	1660-11-28	1608 – 4 July 1673
Henry Mordaunt, 2nd Earl of Peterborough	1663-11-18	? October 1624 – 19 June 1697
Thomas Osbert Mordaunt	1796-04-14	c. 1729 – 13 February 1809 Lt-General in Army
Louis Joel Mordell	1924-05-15	28 January 1888 – 12 March 1972
Henry More	1664-05-25	October 1614 – 1 September 1687
Robert More	1730-02-05	1703 – January 1780 Botanist
Cesar Moreau	1827-02-08	1791 – 28 November 1861
Thomas Morell	1768-06-16	18 March 1703 – 19 February 1784 Garrison chaplain, Portsmouth, librettist
Henry John Reynolds Moreton, 3rd Earl of Ducie	1855-02-22	25 June 1827 – 28 October 1921
Thomas Reynolds-Moreton, 1st Earl of Ducie	1814-06-09	31 August 1776 – 22 June 1840
Giambattista Morgagni	1722-11-30	26 February 1682 – ? 6 December 1771
Anthony Morgan	1663-05-20	1621 – c. November 1668 Original Soldier & MP
Arthur Morgan	1835-04-02	1801 – 10 March 1870 Actuary
Campbell Greig De Morgan	1861-06-06	22 November 1811 – 12 April 1876
Charles Octavius Swinnerton Morgan	1832-02-02	15 September 1803 – 5 August 1888
Conwy Lloyd Morgan	1899-06-01	7 February 1852 – 6 March 1936
David Owen Morgan	2012-04-19	
John Morgan	1765-03-07	10 June 1735 – 15 October 1789
Michael John Morgan	2005-05-26	
Charles Morgan	1816-05-30	5 February 1760 – 5 December 1846
Gilbert Thomas Morgan	1915-05-06	22 September 1870 – 1 February 1940
Morien Bedford Morgan	1972-03-16	20 December 1912 – 4 April 1978
Walter Thomas James Morgan	1949-03-17	5 October 1900 – 10 February 2003
William Morgan	1790-05-06	June 1750 – 4 May 1833
James Justinian Morier	1819-02-04	c. 1780 – 19 March 1849
William Morison	1842-03-03	15 May 1851
Benjamin Morland	1707-03-12	c. 1653 – 9 October 1733 Schoolmaster
Joseph Morland	1703-11-30	c. 1671–1716 Author & Physician
Samuel Morland	1704-11-30	1722
Samuel Morland	1722-05-24	1734
George Morley	1666-11-28	27 Feb 1597 – 29 October 1684
John Morley, 1st Viscount Morley of Blackburn	1892-12-15	24 December 1838 – 23 September 1923 MP
Leslie Sydney Dennis Morley	1992-03-12	16 June 2011
Lorenzo Morosini	1763-03-10	fl 1763
Hervey Redmond Morres, 2nd Viscount Mountmorres	1793-12-12	c. 1746 – 18 August 1797
Corbyn Morris	1757-05-19	24 December 1779 Commissioner of Customs
Edward Morris	1812-06-18	c. 1769 – 13 April 1815 MP for Newport, Cornwall
Gareth Alun Morris	2014-04-30	
George Paulet Morris	1805-02-14	c. 1760 – 17 September 1837 Physician
Howard Redfern Morris	1988-03-17	
John Carnac Morris	1831-03-10	16 October 1798 – 2 August 1858 Civil Servant
John Gareth Morris	1988-03-17	
Matthew Robinson Morris, 2nd Baron Rokeby	1746-11-27	? April 1713 – 30 November 1800
Michael Morris	1764-04-05	1791 Army Physician
Richard Graham Michael Morris	1997-05-15	
Robert Hunter Morris	1755-06-12	c. 1700 – 27 January 1764 Governor of Pennsylvania
Peter John Morris	1994-03-10	
Russell Morris	2016-04-29	Materials chemist
William Richard Morris, Viscount Nuffield	1939-06-08	11 October 1877 – 22 August 1963 Statute
Robert Morrison	1825-05-12	5 January 1782 – 1 August 1834
Henton Morrogh	1964-03-19	29 September 1917 – 20 September 2003
Leonard Morse	1766-05-15	31 January 1808
Robert Morse	1789-11-12	30 February 1743 – 28 January 1818 Military Engineer
Clifford Hiley Mortimer	1958-03-20	27 February 1911 – 11 May 2010 Biologist, Wisconsin
Cromwell Mortimer	1728-06-27	c. 1699 – 7 January 1752
John Mortimer	1705-11-30	c. 1656–1736 Author, Merchant, Agriculturalist
Charles Morton	1752-01-16	1716 – 10 February 1799
John Morton	1703-11-30	c. 1670 – 18 July 1726 Naturalist
John Morton	2011-05-19	Psychologist
Richard Alan Morton	1950-03-16	22 September 1899 – 21 January 1977 Spectroscopist
Henry Moseley	1839-02-07	9 July 1801 – 20 January 1872
Henry Nottidge Moseley	1877-06-07	14 November 1844 – 10 November 1891
Charles Moss	1752-05-28	1711 – 13 April 1802
Joseph William Moss	1830-02-18	1803 – 23 May 1862
William Branks Motherwell	2004-05-27	Professor of Chemistry, University College
Basil Mott	1932-05-05	16 September 1859 – 7 September 1938
Frederick Walker Mott	1896-06-04	23 October 1853 – 8 June 1926
Nevill Francis Mott	1936-05-07	30 September 1905 – 8 August 1996
Allen Moulin	1683-07-18	c. 1653–1690 aka Mullen
Jacques du Moulin	1667-12-05	c. 1686
George Moult	1689-11-30	1727
John Fletcher Moulton, Baron Moulton	1880-06-03	18 November 1844 – 9 March 1921
Pierre Moultou	1780-04-27	27 July 1821
James Mounsey	1750-03-08	1700 – 2 February 1773
William Mountaine	1751-03-14	2 May 1779
Louis Mountbatten, 1st Earl Mountbatten of Burma	1966-05-19	26 June 1900 – 27 August 1979 Statute
Arthur Ernest Mourant	1966-03-17	11 April 1904 – 29 August 1994
Edward Richard Moxon	2007-05-17	
Joseph Moxon	1678-11-30	8 August 1627 – 28 February 1691
John Mudge	1777-05-29	1721 – 26 March 1793
Richard Zachary Mudge	1822-12-05	6 September 1790 – 24 September 1854
William Mudge	1798-06-28	1 December 1762 – 17 April 1820
Ferdinand Jacob Heinrich Mueller	1861-06-06	30 June 1825 – 9 October 1896, botanist
Isabella Helen Mary Muir	1977-03-17	20 August 1920 – 28 November 2005
Robert Muir	1911-05-04	5 July 1864 – 30 March 1959
Thomas Muir	1900-06-14	25 August 1844 – 21 March 1934
Alexander Muirhead	1904-05-05	26 May 1848 – 13 December 1920
Gerhard Friedrich Muller	1730-12-10	1705–1783
Hugo Muller	1866-06-07	29 July 1833 – 23 May 1915
Benjamin von Munchausen	1684-04-30	fl 1684
Jan de Munck	1748-01-21	fl 1748
Nicholas Munckley	1749-01-26	c. 1721 – 20 February 1770
Anthony John Mundella	1882-03-09	28 March 1825 – 21 July 1897
Sean Munro	2011-05-19	
Ludovico Antonio Muratori	1717-11-14	21 October 1673 – 23 January 1750
Charles Murchison	1866-06-07	26 July 1830 – 23 April 1879
Roderick Impey Murchison	1826-04-06	20 February 1792 – 22 October 1871
Patrick Murdoch	1746-03-20	October 1774
Thomas Murdoch	1805-07-04	1758–1846
Robert Murphy	1834-06-05	1806 – 12 March 1843
David William Murray, 3rd Earl of Mansfield	1802-05-20	8 March 1777 – 18 February 1840
David Murray, 4th Viscount Stormont	1666-08-29	24 July 1668
George Murray	1823-06-19	7 February 1772 – 28 July 1846
George Robert Milne Murray	1897-06-03	11 November 1858 – 16 December 1911
James Murray	1779-06-24	c. 1722 – 19 April 1794
James Alexander Murray	1925-05-07	25 November 1873 – 20 November 1950 Director, Imp. Cancer Relief Fund
James Dickson Murray	1985-03-21	
James Murray, 1st Baron Glenlyon	1818-04-09	29 May 1782 – 12 October 1837
John Murray, 4th Duke of Atholl	1780-11-09	30 June 1755 – 29 September 1830
John Murray	1896-06-04	3 March 1841 – 16 March 1914
Kenneth Murray	1979-03-15	30 December 1930 – 7 April 2013
Mungo Murray (clergyman)	1661-09-11	12 October 1599 – 1670
Noreen Elizabeth Murray	1982-03-18	
Robin MacGregor Murray	2010-05-20	
John Norman Murrell	1991-03-14	2 March 1932 - 25 January 2016 Theoretical chemist
Samuel Musgrave	1760-06-12	29 September 1732 – 4 July 1780
William Musgrave	1774-03-17	8 October 1735 – 3 January 1800 Barrister
William Musgrave	1684-03-19	4 November 1655 – ? December 1721
William Musgrave	1722-03-15	c. 1696 – November 1724 Physician
Elon Musk	2018-05-09	28 June 1971
Pieter van Musschenbroek	1734-11-14	14 March 1692 – 19 September 1761
John Myddleton	1739-03-08	1685 - 9 April 1747
Charles Samuel Myers	1915-05-06	13 March 1873 – 12 October 1946
Robert Mylne	1767-05-21	4 January 1734 – 5 May 1811
Robert William Mylne	1860-06-07	14 June 1817 – 2 July 1890
William Chadwell Mylne	1826-03-16	? 5 April 1781 – 25 December 1863
John Mytton	1767-02-26	1769

=== N ===
Names	Election date	Notes
Frank Reginald Nunes Nabarro	1971-03-18	7 March 1916 – 20 July 2006, British-South African physicist
Kiyoshi Nagai	2000-05-11	
Werner Nahm	2011-05-19	
Edward Nairne	1776-06-20	1726 – 1 September 1806
James H. Naismith	2014-05-01	Professor of Chemical Biology, University of St Andrews
William Naper	1679-12-01	? 1683
Henry Edward Napier	1820-05-18	5 March 1789 – 13 October 1853
James Robert Napier	1867-06-06	12 September 1821 – 13 December 1879
Macvey Napier	1817-06-12	12 April 1776 – 11 February 1847
Robert Cornelis Napier, 1st Baron Napier of Magdala	1869-12-16	6 December 1810 – 14 January 1890
James Napier	1775-03-30	c. 1710 – 21 December 1799 Insp-Gen. of N.American hospitals
Roddam Narasimha	1992-03-12	
Mudumbai Seshachalu Narasimhan	1996-03-14	
Ramesh Narayan	2006-05-18	Prof of Astrophysics, Harvard-Smithsonian
Robert Nares	1804-05-10	9 June 1753 – 23 March 1829
George Strong Nares	1875-06-03	24 April 1831 – 15 January 1915
John Narrien	1840-06-18	1782 – 30 March 1860
Joseph Nash	1778-04-09	16 October 1782
Kim Ashley Nasmyth	1989-03-16	
Sir James Naesmyth, Bt	1767-02-12	c. 1704 – 4 February 1779 MP Peeblesshire, botanist
Lorenz Natter	1757-11-24	21 March 1705 – ? December 1763
Philip Naude	1738-02-23	18 October 1684 – 17 January 1745
Louis Jouard de La Nauze	1732-01-27	27 March 1696 – 2 May 1773
George Nayler	1826-06-01	c. 1764 – 28 October 1831
Thomas Neale	1664-06-01	? October 1641 – December 1699
Richard Neave	1785-06-16	22 November 1731 – 28 January 1814
Thomas Neave	1814-05-05	11 November 1761 – 11 April 1848
Caspar Needham	1663-05-20	c. 1622 – 31 October 1679 Original
Dorothy Mary Moyle Needham	1948-03-18	22 September 1896 – 22 December 1987
John Turberville Needham	1747-01-22	10 September 1713 – 30 December 1781
Joseph Needham	1941-03-20	9 December 1900 – 25 March 1995
Roger Michael Needham	1985-03-21	10 February 1935 – 28 February 2003 Fellow 1985-03-21
Walter Needham	1667-06-20	
Paul Neile	1660-11-28	? May 1613 – ? January 1686 Founder
William Neile	1663-05-20	7 December 1637 – 24 August 1670 Original
James Beaumont Neilson	1846-01-15	22 June 1792 – 18 January 1865
Arthur Charles Neish	1971-03-18	4 July 1916 – 7 September 1973, Canadian plant biochemist
John Ashworth Nelder	1981-03-19	8 October 1924 – 7 August 2010 Biomathematician, Rothamsted
Richard John Nelmes	2003-05-15	
Jenny K. Nelson	2014-04-30	
Robert Nelson	1680-04-01	22 June 1656 – 16 January 1715
Edward Nelthorpe	1666-06-27	? 1604 – c. 1685
Evan Nepean	1820-05-04	1751 – 2 October 1822
Robert Nesbitt	1725-04-15	c. 1697 – 27 May 1761 physician
Edward Nettleship	1912-05-02	3 March 1845 – 30 October 1913
Albert Neuberger	1951-03-15	15 April 1908 – 14 August 1996, chemical pathologist
David Neuberger, Baron Neuberger of Abbotsbury	2017-05-05	Honorary fellow
Michael Samuel Neuberger	1993-03-11	biochemist
Bernhard Hermann Neumann	1959-03-19	15 October 1909 – 21 October 2002
Caspar Neumann	1725-12-09	11 July 1683 – 20 October 1737
Peter Le Neve	1712-03-20	? January 1662 – 24 September 1729
Edmund Neville Nevill	1908-05-07	27 August 1849 – 14 January 1940
Anne Neville	2017-05-05	
Francis Henry Neville	1897-06-03	2 December 1847 – 5 June 1915
Hugh Frank Newall	1902-06-05	22 June 1857 – 22 February 1944
Robert Stirling Newall	1875-06-03	27 May 1812 – 21 April 1889
Thomas John Newbold	1842-01-06	9 February 1807 – 29 May 1850
John Newburgh	1664-11-02	1630–1692
Peter Newcome	1743-02-24	1779
John Newey	1696-11-30	4 December 1664 – 13 September 1735
Dudley Maurice Newitt	1942-03-19	28 April 1894 – 14 March 1980
Maxwell Herman Alexander Newman	1939-03-16	8 February 1897 – 22 February 1984
Ronald Charles Newman	1998-05-14	
William Newmarch	1861-06-06	28 January 1820 – 23 March 1882
George Newport	1846-03-26	4 July 1803 – 7 April 1854
John Michael Newsom-Davis	1991-03-14	
Robert Newstead	1912-05-02	12 September 1859 – 17 February 1947
Alfred Newton	1870-06-02	11 June 1829 – 7 June 1907
Edwin Tulley Newton	1893-06-01	4 May 1840 – 28 January 1930
Henry Newton	1709-05-04	18 August 1651 – 29 July 1715 Advocate, Diplomat
Ian Newton	1993-03-11	
Isaac Newton	1672-01-11	25 December 1642 – 20 March 1727, PRS 1703–1727, natural philosopher, mathematician, astronomer, physicist
William Nicholas	1742-04-01	1750
Sir John Nicholl	1806-03-20	16 March 1759 – 26 August 1838
Whitlock Nicholl	1830-02-18	1786 – 3 December 1838
David G. Nicholls	2019-04-16	
Frank Nicholls	1728-05-02	1699 – 7 January 1788
John Nicholls	1744-03-08	? 1710 – 11 January 1745 Merchant
John Graham Nicholls	1988-03-17	
Colin Nichols	2014-04-30	Biochemist, Washington University in St. Louis
Henry Nicholson	1716-04-05	c.1681 - 1733 Irish Physician
Henry Alleyne Nicholson	1897-06-03	11 September 1844 – 19 January 1899
John William Nicholson	1917-05-03	1 November 1881 – ? 3 October 1955
Robert Nicholson	1807-06-04	fl.1807
Francis Nicholson	1706-12-04	1660 – 5 March 1728
Robin Buchanan Nicholson	1978-03-16	
Joseph Arthur Colin Nicol	1967-03-16	5 December 1915 – 20 December 2004
Antonio Nicolini, Marchese di Ponsacco	1747-03-26	1700–1769
Alexander Nicoll	1826-02-23	3 April 1793 – 24 September 1828
John Nicoll	1765-02-28	fl 1765
William Nicolson	1705-11-30	3 June 1655 – 14 February 1727
James Nihill	1742-04-01	1705 – 1 June 1759
Robert Adam Nisbet-Hamilton	1833-04-18	9 June 1877
Charles Niven	1880-06-03	14 September 1845 – 11 May 1923
William Davidson Niven	1882-06-08	24 March 1842 – 29 March 1917
Louis Jules Barbon Mancini Mazarini Nivernois	1763-02-10	16 December 1716 – 98
John Nixon	1744-11-15	May 1777
John Forster Nixon	1994-03-10	
Robert Nixon	1801-06-11	1759 – 5 November 1837 Clergyman
Henry Minchin Noad	1856-06-05	22 June 1815 – 23 July 1877
Alison Noble	2017-05-05	
Denis Noble	1979-03-15	
Andrew Noble	1870-06-02	13 September 1831 – 22 October 1915
Stephen Robert Nockolds	1959-03-19	11 May 1909 – 7 February 1990
George Henry Noehden	1820-05-04	23 January 1770 – 14 March 1826
Henry Noel-Fearn	1842-04-14	1811 – 11 March 1868 alias Henry Christmas, Clergyman
John Anthony Noguier	1809-04-13	fl.1809
Frederick Nolan	1833-02-07	9 February 1784 – 16 September 1864 Clergyman, theologian
Gustaf Adam von Nolcken	1777-05-08	17 September 1733 – 16 December 1812
Jean Antoine Nollet	1735-01-23	19 November 1700 – 24 April 1770
John Mervin Nooth	1774-03-03	? September 1737 – 3 May 1828
Frederic Lewis Norden	1741-01-08	22 October 1708 – 22 September 1742, Danish naval captain and explorer
Alfred Merle Norman	1890-06-05	29 August 1831 – 26 October 1918
Richard Oswald Chandler Norman	1977-03-17	27 April 1932 – 6 June 1993
Edward Norris	1698-11-09	1663 – 22 July 1726 Physician
Ronald George Wreyford Norrish	1936-05-07	9 November 1897 – 7 June 1978
Frederick North, 5th Earl of Guilford	1794-02-06	7 February 1766 – 14 October 1827
George Augustus North, 3rd Earl of Guilford	1782-01-17	11 September 1757 – 20 April 1802
Richard Alan North	1995-03-09	
Ford North	1900-06-21	10 January 1830 – 12 October 1913
William North, 6th Baron North and 2nd Lord Grey	1720-06-30	22 December 1678 – 31 October 1734
Donald Henry Northcote	1968-03-21	27 December 1921 – 8 January 2004
Stafford Henry Northcote, 1st Earl of Iddesleigh and Viscount St Cyres	1875-02-18	27 October 1818 – 12 January 1887
Douglas Geoffrey Northcott	1961-03-16	31 December 1916 – 8 April 2005
William Northey	1753-06-21	1721 – 24 December 1770 Commissioner & MP gor Calne, Maidstone & Bedwin
Fletcher Norton, 1st Baron Grantley	1776-04-18	23 June 1716 – 1 January 1789
Gustav Joseph Victor Nossal	1982-03-18	biologist
Thomas Nott	1663-05-20	? December 1606 – 18 December 1681 Original
Edward Nourse	1728-10-24	1701 – 13 May 1761 Surgeon
Thomas Novell	1681-04-06	1686
Konstantin Sergeevich Novoselov	2011-05-19	aka Kostya Novoselov
Christopher Nugent	1768-04-14	12 October 1775 Physician
Paul Maxime Nurse	1989-03-16	
Phillip Sadler Nutman	1968-03-21	10 October 1914 – 5 May 2004
George Henry Falkiner Nuttall	1904-05-05	5 July 1862 – 16 December 1937
John Frederick Nye	1976-03-18	
Peter Hague Nye	1987-03-19	16 September 1921 – 13 February 2009 Soil Chemist
Ronald Sydney Nyholm	1958-03-20	29 January 1917 – 4 December 1971

=== O ===
Name	Election date	Notes
Lucius Henry O'Brien	1773-05-27	1731 – 15 January 1795
Paul O'Brien	2013-05-02	
Anne O'Garra	2008-05-16	
James O'Hara, 2nd Baron Tyrawley	1748-01-07	1690 – 14 July 1773
Michael John O'Hara	1981-03-19	
Peter O'Hearn	2018-05-09	13 July 1963 –
John Michael O'Keefe	1992-03-12	Cognitive neuroscientist
Hugh O'Neill	2012-04-19	Experimental Petrologist/Thermodynamicist
Luke O'Neill	2016-04-29	Biochemist
Robert Keith O'Nions	1983-03-17	
William Brooke O'Shaughnessy	1843-03-16	October 1809 – 10 January 1889
Cornelius O'Sullivan	1885-06-04	20 December 1841 – 8 January 1907
Sylvia Onora O'Niell, Baroness O’Neill of Bengarve	2007-05-17	Honorary
Stephen Patrick O’Rahilly	2003-05-15	
Charles Henry Oakes	1835-04-02	25 November 1810 – 16 May 1864
Cyril Leslie Oakley	1957-03-21	20 June 1907 – 27 March 1975
Charles William Oatley	1969-03-20	15 February 1904 – 11 March 1996
John Richard Ockendon	1999-05-13	
William Odling	1859-06-09	5 September 1829 – 17 February 1921 Prof of Chemistry, Guy's Hospital
Albert Cyril Offord	1952-03-20	9 June 1906 – 4 June 2000
Raymond William Ogden	2006-05-18	
Bridget Margaret Ogilvie	2003-05-15	
James Ogilvy, 1st Earl of Seafield and 4th Earl of Findlater	1698-11-09	11 July 1663 – 15 August 1730
James Adey Ogle	1826-02-02	22 October 1792 – 25 September 1857
James Edward Oglethorpe	1749-11-09	22 December 1696 – 1 July 1785
Alexander George Ogston	1955-03-17	30 January 1911 – 29 June 1996
Takeshi Oka	1984-03-15	
Heinrich Wilhelm Matthäus Olbers	1804-04-12	11 October 1758 – 2 March 1840
Henry Oldenburg	1663-04-22	c. 1617 – ? September 1677 Original
John Oldershaw	1786-11-16	27 May 1754 – 31 January 1847
Richard Dixon Oldham	1911-05-04	31 July 1858 – 15 July 1936
Thomas Oldham	1848-06-09	4 May 1816 – 17 July 1878
Charles Oliphant	1713-06-11	c. 1666–1720
Marcus Laurence Elwin Oliphant	1937-05-06	8 October 1901 – 14 July 2000
David Ian Olive	1987-03-19	
Benjamin Oliveira	1835-06-04	c. 1807 – 28 September 1865
Daniel Oliver	1863-06-04	7 February 1830 – 21 December 1916
Francis Wall Oliver	1905-05-11	10 May 1864 – 14 September 1951
William Oliver	1730-01-22	4 August 1695 – 17 March 1764
William Oliver	1703-11-30	1659 – 4 April 1716 Army Physician
William David Ollis	1972-03-16	22 December 1924 – 13 June 1999
Erasmus Ommanney	1868-06-04	22 May 1814 – 21 December 1904
Charles Savill Onley	1819-02-18	? 1757 – 31 August 1843
Edward Onslow	1780-01-27	9 April 1758 – 18 October 1829
Sir Henry John Oram	1912-05-02	19 June 1858 – 5 May 1939
Craven Ord	1787-05-03	1756 – ? January 1832
John Ord	1780-06-01	c. 1729 – 6 June 1814
Ralph Ord	1723-11-30	1724
Robert Ord	1724-03-12	? 12 February 1778
Christine Anne Orengo	2019-04-16	22 June 1955 –
Leslie Eleazer Orgel	1962-03-15	12 January 1927 - 27 October 2007
Barnaba Oriani	1795-04-16	17 July 1752 – 12 November 1832
Louis Philippe Albert d'Orleans, Count of Paris	1865-04-27	24 August 1838 – 8 September 1894
Edward Latham Ormerod	1872-06-06	27 August 1819 – 18 March 1873 Physician & Entomologist
George Ormerod	1819-02-25	20 October 1785 – 9 October 1873
H. Alexander Ormsby	1839-04-11	fl 1839
Egon Orowan	1947-03-20	2 August 1902 – 3 August 1989
William McFadden Orr	1909-05-06	2 May 1866 – 14 August 1934
Andrew Orr-Ewing	2017-05-05	
Giovanni Giuseppe, Marquis Orsi	1716-11-30	19 June 1652 – 21 December 1733
Casimiro Gómez Ortega	1777-06-05	4 March 1740 – 30 August 1818
Jose Arcadio de Ortega	1753-03-08	1761
James Herbert Orton	1948-03-18	12 March 1884 – 2 February 1953
Kennedy Joseph Previté Orton	1921-05-12	21 January 1872 – 16 March 1930
Jean Jacques d'Ortous de Mairan	1735-01-23	27 November 1678 – 20 February 1771
John Osborn	1777-04-17	16 July 1743 – 12 January 1814 Diplomat
Sherard Osborn	1870-06-02	25 April 1822 – 6 May 1875
Francis Osborne, 5th Duke of Leeds	1773-04-01	29 January 1751 – 31 January 1799
Thomas Osborne, 4th Duke of Leeds	1739-12-20	6 November 1713 – 23 March 1789
Anne Elisabeth Osbourn	2019-04-16	
Oscar I, King of Sweden and Norway	1826-12-21	4 July 1799 – 8 July 1859 Royal
Abraham Follett Osler	1855-06-07	22 March 1808 – 26 April 1903
William Osler	1898-06-09	12 July 1849 – 29 December 1919
Charles Barry Osmond	1984-03-15	
Il Cavaliere Osorio	1748-04-21	fl 1748
Ronald Harry Ottewill	1982-03-18	
Alexander Ouchterlony	1734-03-07	13 April 1758
Nicholas Oudart	1667-11-21	December 1681
Gore Ouseley	1817-12-18	24 June 1770 – 18 November 1844
Benjamin Fonseca Outram	1838-05-03	1775 – 16 February 1856
David J. Owen	2017-05-05	
David Roger Jones Owen	2009	
Henry Owen	1755-06-12	1716 – 14 October 1795
John Joseph Thomas Owen	1988-03-17	
Paul Robert Owen	1971-03-18	24 January 1920 – 11 November 1990
Richard Owen	1834-12-18	20 July 1804 – 18 December 1892
Ernest Ronald Oxburgh, Baron Oxburgh of Liverpool in the County of Merseyside	1978-03-16	
George D'Oyly	1815-03-16	31 October 1778 – 8 January 1846 Clergyman

== Foreign members ==
=== M ===
Names	Election date	Notes
Heinrich Gustav Magnus	1863-04-30	2 May 1802 – 4 April 1870
Ho-kwang (David) Mao	2008-05-16	
Rudolph Arthur Marcus	1987-06-25	Canadian-born U.S. chemist, Nobel Prize (1992)
Emmanuel Marie Pierre Martin Jacquin de Margerie	1931-06-25	11 November 1862 – ? 20 December 1953
Jean Charles Galissard de Marignac	1881-05-12	24 April 1817 – 15 April 1894
Hubert Simon Markl	2002-05-09	
Peter Robert Marler	2008-05-16	
Gail Roberta Martin	2015	1944 - American biologist
Carl Friedrich Philipp von Martius	1838-12-20	17 April 1794 – 13 December 1868
Eleuthere Elie Nicolas Mascart	1892-05-19	21 February 1837 – ? 24 August 1908
Ernst Mayr	1988-06-30	5 July 1904 – 3 January 2005
Barbara McClintock	1989-06-29	16 June 1902 – 2 September 1992
Elmer Verner McCollum	1961-04-27	3 March 1879 – 15 November 1967
Hugh O'Neill McDevitt	1994-06-09	
Marcia McNutt	2017-05-05	
Johann Friedrich Meckel	1833-06-06	? 17 October 1781 – 31 October 1833
Lise Meitner	1955-04-28	7 November 1878 – 27 October 1968, Austrian-born Swedish physicist nuclear fission
Macedonio Melloni	1839-05-30	11 April 1798 – 11 August 1854
Dmitri Ivanovich Mendeleeff	1892-05-19	? 7 February 1834 – 2 February 1907 Foreign Member
Matthew Stanley Meselson	1984-06-28	U.S. molecular biologist
Elias Metchnikoff	1895-12-12	? 15 May 1845 – 15 July 1916, aka Ilya Ilyich Mechnikov, Ukrainian-born Russian French scientist, Nobel Prize for Medicine (1908)
Otto Fritz Meyerhof	1937-06-17	12 April 1884 – 6 October 1951, German-born U.S. scientist, Nobel Prize (1922)
Elliot Martin Meyerowitz	2004-05-27	U.S. plant biologist
Hartmut Michel	2005-05-26	
Albert A. Michelson	1902-11-27	19 December 1852 – 9 May 1931, Polish-born U.S. physicist, Nobel Prize (1907)
William Hughes Miller	2015	16/03/41 - American chemist
Henri Milne-Edwards	1848-03-30	23 October 1800 – 29 July 1885
Charles-François Brisseau de Mirbel	1837-04-27	27 March 1776 – 12 September 1854
Silas Weir Mitchell	1908-06-04	16 February 1829 – 4 January 1914
Eilhard Mitscherlich	1828-05-15	7 January 1794 – ? 28 August 1863
Gösta Mittag-Leffler	1896-11-26	16 March 1846 – 7 July 1927
Hugo von Mohl	1868-03-26	8 April 1805 – 1 April 1872
Henri Moissan	1905-05-11	28 September 1852 – 20 February 1907, French chemist, artificial diamonds, Nobel Prize (1906)
Jacques Lucien Monod	1968-04-25	10 February 1910 – 31 May 1976
Ginés Morata	2017-05-05	19 April 1945 – Spanish biologist
Thomas Hunt Morgan	1919-06-26	25 September 1866 – 4 December 1945
Domenico Pini Morichini	1827-03-08	23 September 1773 – 19 November 1836
Kurt Albin Mothes	1971-04-22	3 November 1900 – 12 February 1983
Vernon Benjamin Mountcastle	1996-03-14	
Hermann Joseph Muller	1953-04-23	21 December 1890 – 5 April 1967
Johannes Muller	1840-06-04	14 July 1801 – 28 April 1858
Robert Sanderson Mulliken	1967-04-20	7 June 1896 – 31 October 1986
David Mumford	2008-05-16	
Walter Heinrich Munk	1976-04-08	19 October 1917 – 8 February 2019, Austrian-born U.S. geophysicist

=== N ===
Name	Election date	Notes
Carl Wilhelm von Nägeli	1881-05-12	27 March 1817 – ? 11 May 1891
Louis Eugène Félix Néel	1966-04-21	22 November 1904 – 14 November 2000
Erwin Neher	1994-06-09	
Hermann Walther Nernst	1932-06-02	25 June 1864 – ? 19 November 1941
Aleksandr Nikolaevich Nesmeyanov	1961-04-27	9 September 1899 – 17 January 1980
Franz Ernst Neumann	1862-06-19	11 September 1798 – 23 May 1895
Georg Balthasar von Neumayer	1899-06-01	21 June 1826 – 25 May 1909
Simon Newcomb	1877-12-13	12 March 1835 – 11 July 1909
Hubert Anson Newton	1892-05-19	19 March 1830 – 12 August 1896
Jerzy Neyman	1979-04-26	16 April 1894 – 5 August 1981
Kyriacos Costa Nicolaou	2013-05-02	
Yasutomi Nishizuka	1990-06-28	12 July 1932 – 4 November 2004
Niels Erik Nørlund	1938-05-19	26 October 1885 – 4 July 1981
Ryōji Noyori	2005-05-26	
Shosaku Numa	1986-06-26	8 February 1929 – 15 February 1992
Christiane Nüsslein-Volhard	1990-06-28	

=== O ===
Name	Election date	Notes
Giuseppe Paolo Stanislao Occhialini	1974-04-25	1907 – 30 December 1993
Severo Ochoa	1965-04-08	24 September 1905 – 1 November 1993
Hans Christian Ørsted	1821-04-12	14 August 1777 – 9 March 1851
Georg Simon Ohm	1842-05-05	? 16 March 1787 – ? 7 July 1854
George Olah	1997	Hungarian-born U.S. chemist, Nobel Prize (1994)
Jean Baptiste Julien d'Omalius d'Halloy	1873-11-27	17 February 1783 – 15 January 1875 Foreign Member
Heike Kamerlingh Onnes	1916-03-23	22 September 1853 – 21 February 1926 Foreign Member
Lars Onsager	1975-04-24	27 November 1903 – 5 October 1976
Jan Hendrik Oort	1959-04-23	28 April 1900 – 5 November 1992
J. Robert Oppenheimer	1962-05-03	23 April 1904 – 18 February 1967 Foreign Member, U.S. Physicist
Henry Fairfield Osborn	1926-04-29	8 August 1857 – 6 November 1935
Jeremiah Ostriker	2007-05-17	
