= John Freke (surgeon) =

English surgeon

- Born: 1688; England
- Died: 1756 (aged 67–68); England
- Occupation: Surgeon

John Freke (1688–1756) was an English surgeon. Together with Percival Pott he was instrumental in separating the profession of surgeon from that of barber.

Freke was the son of a rural minister from Ockford Fitzpaine, Dorset. At the age of 17 he was apprenticed to a prominent London surgeon, Richard Blundell.

He became an assistant surgeon at St Bartholomew's Hospital (known as Barts) in 1726, and one year later was put in charge of the anatomical and surgical preparations. In 1727 the Governors of Barts had decided that there was a requirement for some surgeons to be specialists, and Freke was appointed to deal with diseases of the eye, becoming the first ophthalmic surgeon.

He was a surgeon at Barts from 1729 to 1755 and was a Governor of the hospital from 1736 to 1756. He trained Edward Nourse who in turn trained Percival Pott. In 1745 he established the Company of Surgeons. He designed several medical instruments including an improved obstetric forceps. He was the first to record the genetic error that causes fibrodysplasia ossificans progressiva, and his 1748 Essay on the Art of Healing identified points of interest of breast cancer and referred to the danger of not removing infected lymphatic tissue.

The Murder Act 1752 allowed the bodies of convicted murderers to be dissected for the study of anatomy, and in his role overseeing anatomical preparations, Freke was able to take advantage of the increase in the number of available specimens. The hospital hired a house in Cock Lane to which the bodies were delivered.

He had scientific interests outside medicine. He was elected as a Fellow of the Royal Society in 1729 and contributed various articles to their journal, Philosophical Transactions of the Royal Society. In 1746 he wrote a treatise on electricity, An Essay to shew the Cause of Electricity and why some things are Non-Electricable, in which is also considered its Influence in the Blasts on Human Bodies, in the Blights on Trees, in the Damps in Mines, and as it may affect the Sensitive Plants (republished in 1752 with the more concise title Treatise on the Nature and Property of Fire), expressing the belief that lightning and electricity were the same. He is mentioned in Tom Jones and as a friend of William Hogarth may have been the model for the president of the College of Surgeons in Reward of Cruelty, the final plate of his series The Four Stages of Cruelty. His friendship with Samuel Richardson meant he was one of select group who were able to read the manuscript of Clarissa before it was published.

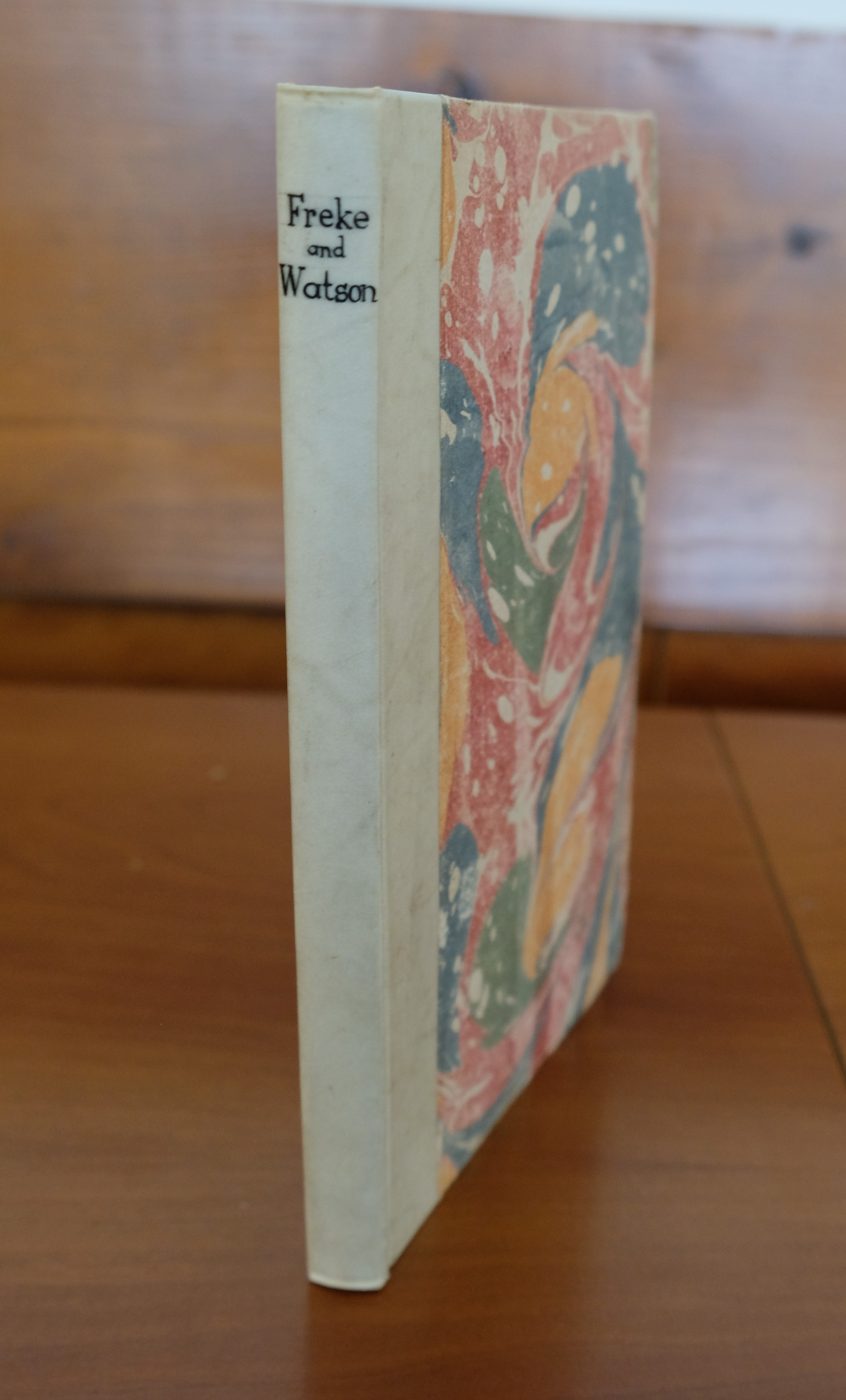
1746 copy of Freke's "An essay to shew the cause of electricity, and why some things are non-electricable"

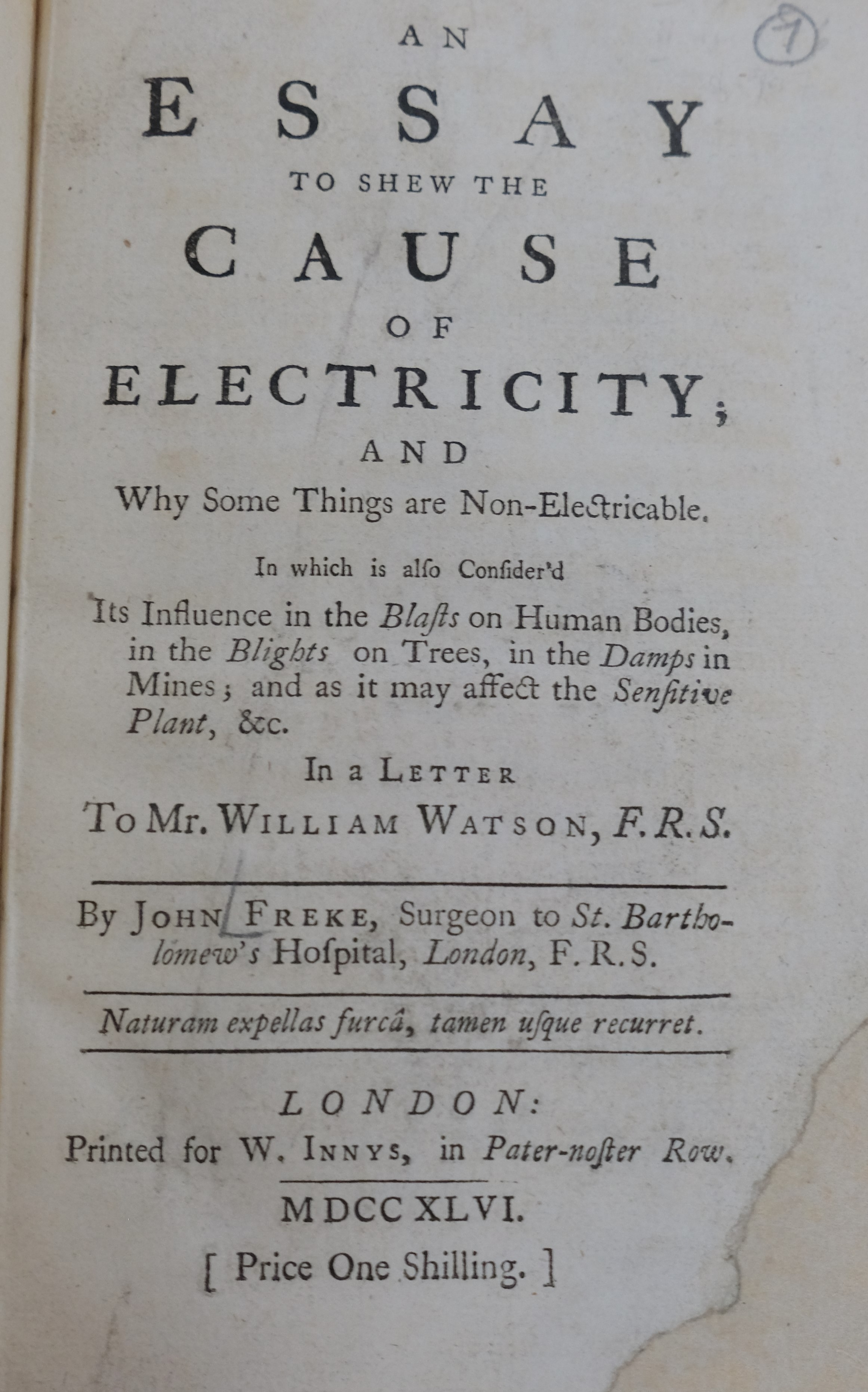
Title page to "An essay to shew the cause of electricity, and why some things are non-electricable"

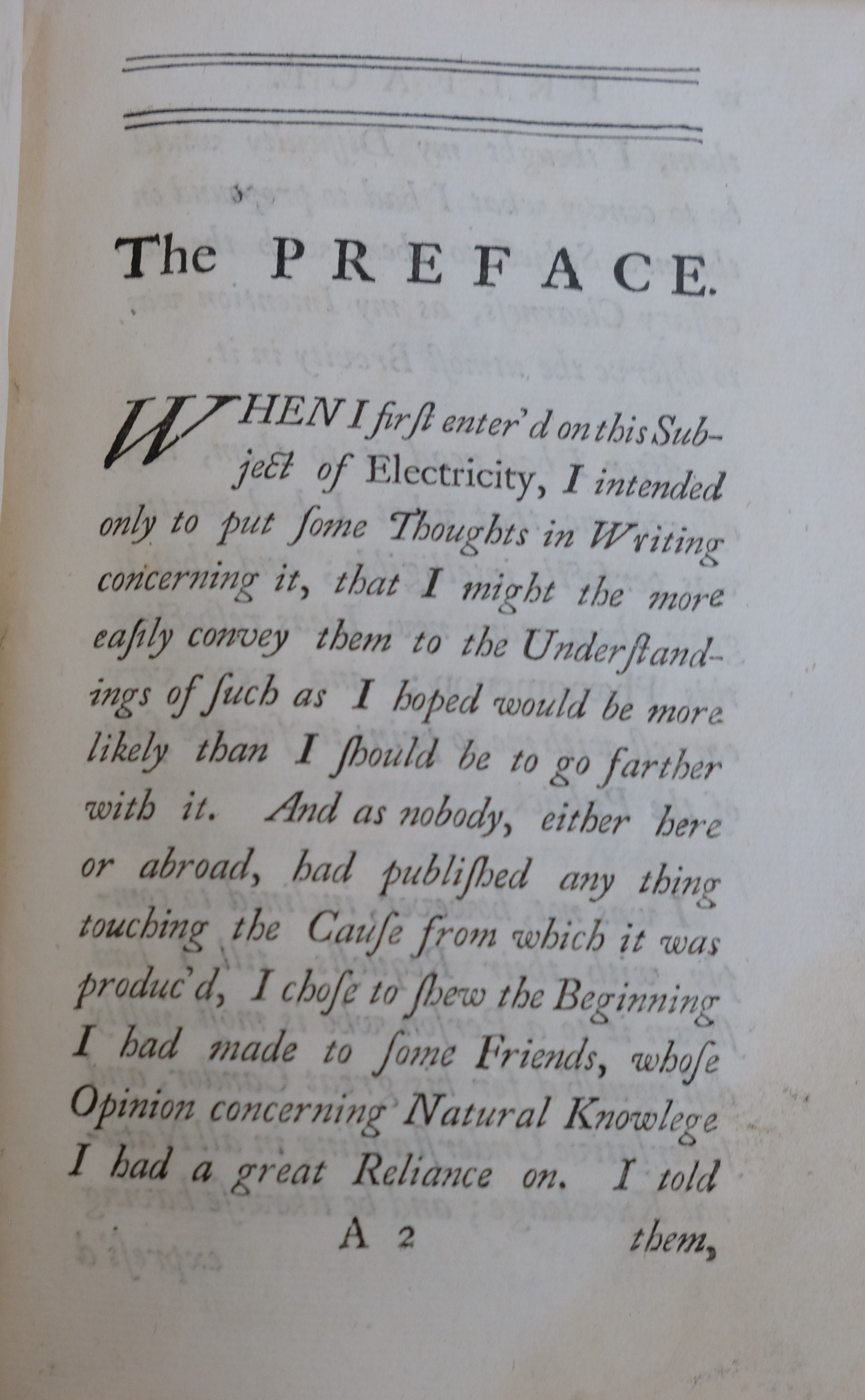
Preface to "An essay to shew the cause of electricity, and why some things are non-electricable"

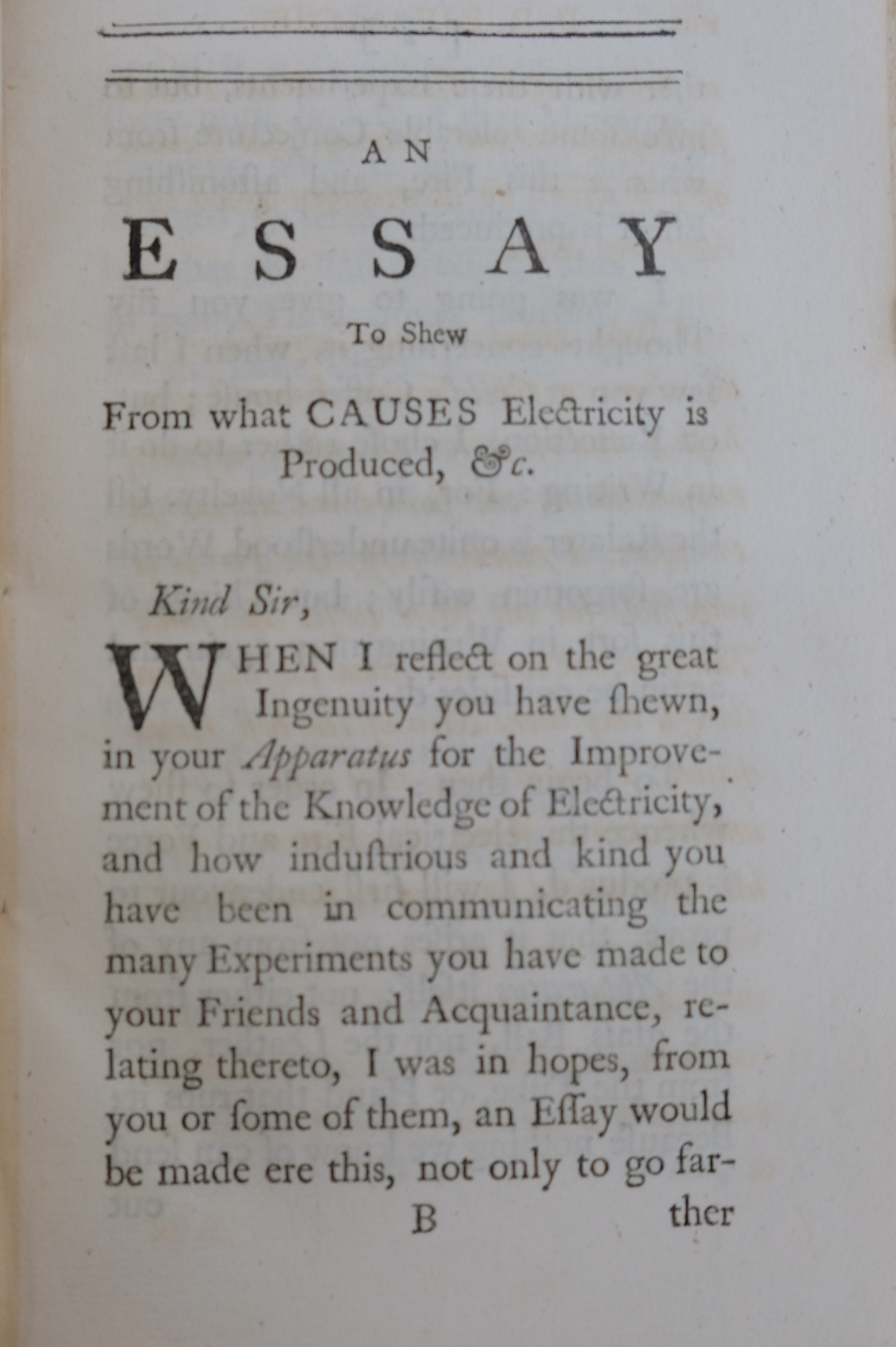
First page of "An essay to shew the cause of electricity, and why some things are non-electricable"
