= Edward Nourse =

Edward Nourse may refer to:

- Edward Everett Nourse (1863–1929), American Congregational theologian
- Edward Nourse (surgeon) (1701–1738), surgeon and member of the Royal Society
