= Derek J. S. Robinson =

British Mathematician

Derek John Scott Robinson (born 25 September 1938 in Montrose, Scotland) is a British mathematician, specialising in group theory and homological algebra.

== Education and career ==
Robinson graduated in 1960 with a bachelor's degree from the University of Edinburgh and in 1963 with a Ph.D. from the University of Cambridge. His Ph.D. thesis Theory of Subnormal Subgroups was supervised by Philip Hall. As a postdoc, Robinson was from 1963 to 1965 an instructor at the University of Illinois Urbana-Champaign. From 1965 to 1968 he was a lecturer at Queen Mary College (now named Queen Mary University of London). At the University of Illinois Urbana-Champaign he was an assistant professor from 1968 to 1969, an associate professor from 1969 to 1974, and a full professor from 1974 to 2007, when he retired as professor emeritus. He held visiting appointments in Switzerland, Italy, Germany, and Singapore.

Robinson's 1964 paper on T-groups has over 250 citations. At Edinburgh he was awarded The Napier Medal in Mathematics in 1960, in 1970 the Sir Edmund Whittaker Memorial Prize, and received in 1979 a Humboldt Prize.

== Books ==
- with S. Cruz Rambaud, J. García Pérez, and R.A. Nehmer: Algebraic models for accounting systems, World Scientific, Singapore, 2010. ISBN 981-4287-11-3
- A course in linear algebra with applications, World Scientific, 1991 ISBN 9810205686; 2nd edition 2006
- An introduction to abstract algebra, De Gruyter 2003 ISBN 3-11-017544-4; Abstract algebra: an introduction with applications, 3rd edition 2022
- with John C. Lennox: Theory of infinite soluble groups, Clarendon Press, Oxford 2004 ISBN 0-19-850728-3
- A course in the theory of groups, Springer Verlag, 1982, 2nd edition 1996 ISBN 0-387-94461-3
- Finiteness conditions and generalized soluble groups, Parts I & II, Springer Verlag 1972
- Infinite soluble and nilpotent groups, London 1968
- as editor with Phillip Griffith: The mathematical legacy of Reinhold Baer: a collection of articles in honor of the centenary of the birth of Reinhold Baer, University of Illinois, Urbana-Champaign, 2004 ISBN 0974698601
