= Sir Edmund Whittaker Memorial Prize =

Award of the Edinburgh Mathematical Society

The Sir Edmund Whittaker Memorial Prize is awarded every four years by the Edinburgh Mathematical Society to an outstanding young mathematician having a specified connection with Scotland. It is named after Sir Edmund Whittaker.

== History ==
After the death of Sir Edmund Whittaker in 1956, his son John Macnaghten Whittaker donated on behalf of the Whittaker Family the sum of £500 to the Edinburgh Mathematical Society to establish a prize for mathematical work in memory of his father. As of 2009, the award money remains £500.

== Winners ==
- 2023 Jonathan Fraser (University of St Andrews)
- 2021 Ben Davison (University of Edinburgh)
- 2019 Michela Ottobre (Heriot-Watt University)
- 2016 Arend Bayer (University of Edinburgh)
- 2013 Stuart White (University of Glasgow)
- 2009 Agata Smoktunowicz (University of Edinburgh)
- 2005 Tom Bridgeland (University of Sheffield)
- 2001 Michael McQuillan and J A Sherratt
- 1997 Alan D Rendall (Max-Planck-Institut für Gravitationsphysik)
- 1993 Mitchell A. Berger and Alan W. Reid
- 1989 A A Lacey and Michael Röckner
- 1985 John Mackintosh Howie
- 1981 John M. Ball (University of Oxford)
- 1977 Gavin Brown and C A Stuart
- 1973 A M Davie (University of Edinburgh)
- 1970 Derek J S Robinson (University of Illinois)
- 1965 John Bryce McLeod (University of Oxford)
- 1961 A G Mackie and Andrew H. Wallace

== See also ==
- List of mathematics awards
