= Gillian Slater =

British mathematician and academic administrator

Gillian Lesley Slater FIMA (née Filtness) is a retired British mathematician and academic administrator, the former vice chancellor of Bournemouth University.

== Education ==
Slater read mathematics in St Hugh's College, Oxford, where she served as secretary of the Oxford University Liberal Democrats in 1969. She completed a DPhil at the University of Oxford in 1973, with the dissertation Some Topics in Functional–Differential Equations supervised by John Bryce McLeod.

== Career ==
Slater became a mathematics instructor at South Bank Polytechnic (now London South Bank University) and at Sheffield City Polytechnic (now Sheffield Hallam University). She moved into academic administration as dean of science and technology at Manchester Polytechnic, and then after it became Manchester Metropolitan University, as pro-vice-chancellor.

Her next step was to become vice chancellor of Bournemouth University, in 1994, succeeding the university's first vice chancellor, Bernard MacManus. She came under pressure from the UK's Labour government in 2004 for taking a stand against the government's push to institute differential fees for different universities, and retired in 2005, replaced as vice chancellor by atmospheric scientist Paul Curran.
