= Alan Reid (mathematician) =

American mathematician

Alan William Reid
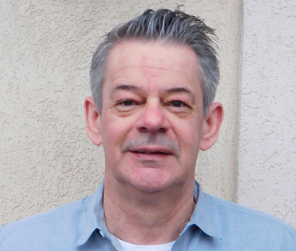
- Born: June 14, 1962 (age 64); Scotland
- Education: University of Aberdeen
- Scientific career
- Fields: Mathematics
- Workplaces: Rice University; University of Texas, Austin
- Thesis: Arithmetic Kleinian Groups and their Fuchsian Subgroups (1988)
- Doctoral advisor: Colin Maclachlan

Alan William Reid (born June 14, 1962) is a Scottish-American mathematician working primarily with arithmetic hyperbolic 3-manifolds. He is the Edgar Odell Lovett Chair of mathematics at Rice University, 2017—present.

== Biography ==
Reid grew up in Buckie, Scotland. He obtained his doctorate from the University of Aberdeen, supervised by Colin Maclachlan, on the topic of Arithmetic Kleinian Groups and their Fuchsian Subgroups. He was a Royal Society University Research Fellow at Cambridge 1992–96. He was awarded the Sloan Research Fellowship in 1997, and became one of the (inaugural) Fellows of the American Mathematical Society in 2013.

== Research ==
Alan Reid's research primarily focusses on low-dimensional topology, hyperbolic manifolds and profinite groups. He proved that the figure-eight knot is the only knot whose complement is an arithmetic hyperbolic 3-manifold. With Martin Bridson, Ben McReynolds and Ryan Spitler, he found the first examples of non-elementary Kleinian groups which are determined by their finite quotients among finitely generated residually finite groups.

He has published more than 100 papers, and supervised 21 PhD students to completion as of 2023.

=== Notable publications ===
- MacLachlan, Colin; Reid, Alan W. (2003). The Arithmetic of Hyperbolic 3-Manifolds. Graduate Texts in Mathematics. Vol. 219. doi:10.1007/978-1-4757-6720-9. ISBN 978-1-4419-3122-1. with Colin Maclachlan.

== Awards and honours ==
- Speaker at the 2018 International Congress of Mathematicians, Rio de Janeiro.
- Pennzoil Company Regents Professor of Mathematics, University of Texas, Austin, 2011–2016.
- Sir Edmund Whittaker Prize in 1993.
