= List of fellows of the Royal Society elected in 1992 =

This is a list of fellows of the Royal Society elected in 1992.

== Fellows ==
1. Jerry McKee Adams
2. James Greig Arthur
3. Elizabeth Blackburn
4. Sir Colin Blakemore
5. Geoffrey Boulton
6. Suzanne Cory
7. Rodney Deane Davies
8. Peter Neville Goodfellow
9. Ian Philip Grant
10. Geoffrey Wilson Greenwood
11. Richard Langton Gregory (1923–2010)
12. Charles Nicholas Hales (1935–2005)
13. Paul H. Harvey
14. Sir David Jack (1924–2011)
15. Alwyn Jones
16. Peter George Lecomber
17. David Graham Lloyd
18. Raymond Douglas Lund
19. Keith Alan McLauchlan
20. John Bryce McLeod
21. Andrew James McMichael
22. Michael Mingos
23. Leslie Sydney Dennis Morley (1924–2011)
24. Roddam Narasimha
25. John O'Keefe
26. Bernard Ephraim Julius Pagel (1930–2007)
27. Godfrey Stuart Pawley
28. David N. Payne
29. Gordon Plotkin
30. Robert Ramage
31. Sir Alan Rudge
32. Andrew N. Schofield
33. David John Sherratt
34. Alain Townsend
35. Endel Tulving
36. James Johnson Turner
37. Daniel Frank Walls (1942–1999)
38. Nigel Weiss
39. William Joseph Whelan
40. John Raymond Willis

== Foreign members ==
1. Paul Berg
2. Luigi Luca Cavalli-Sforza
3. Masao Ito
4. William Platt Jencks
5. Chen-Ning Yang
