= Howard Morris (biochemist) =

British biochemist

Howard Morris FRS
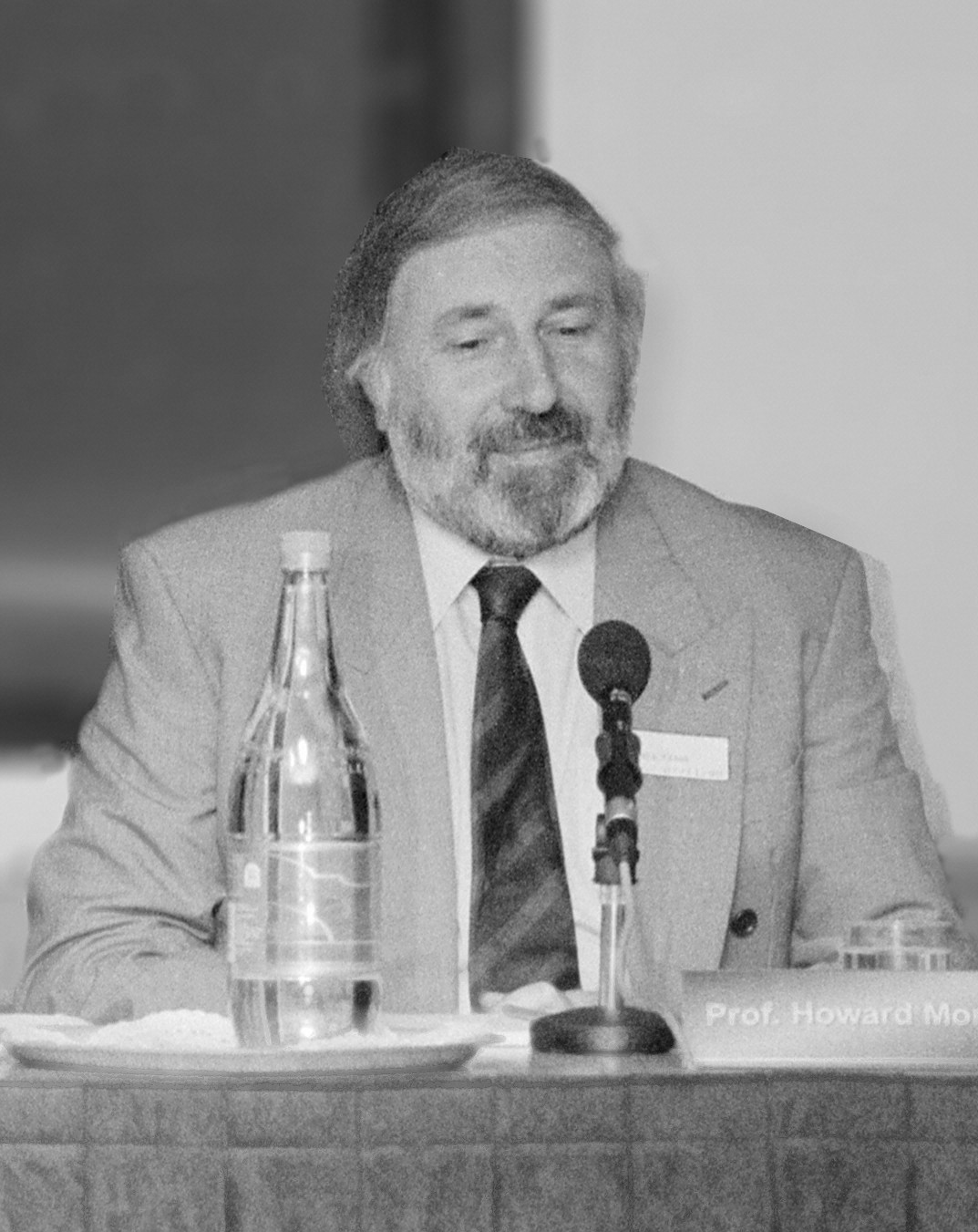
- Morris at the 'Endogenous Opiates' Witness Seminar in November 1995
- Born: Howard Redfern Morris; Bolton, Lancashire, United Kingdom
- Occupation: Biochemist
- Employer: Imperial College

Howard Redfern Morris FRS is a British biochemist.

He worked at Imperial College as a lecturer from 1975 to 1978, as a Reader in Protein Chemistry from 1978 to 1980, and as professor (later emeritus) of biological chemistry, from 1980.

He is president and CSO, BiopharmaSpec Ltd and serves as a member of the audit committee, of the Institute of Cancer Research.

He was elected a Fellow of the Royal Society in 1988, and in 2014 received the Society's Royal Medal:

For his pioneering work in biomolecular mass spectrometry including strategy and instrument design and for outstanding entrepreneurship in biopharmaceutical characterisation.
