= William George Meredith =

William George Meredith (1804–1831) was an English historian. He was elected a Fellow of the Royal Society in 1830.

== Life ==
He was the son of George Meredith (1762–1831) of London; his father was an architect. Meredith's father and uncle, who was also named William George Meredith (c. 1756–1831), were the patrons of Thomas Taylor, a prolific neoplatonist translator and the first to translate many important Ancient Greek works into English. The Meredith family were neighbours in Bloomsbury of the family of Isaac D'Israeli, and William was a close friend of the young Benjamin Disraeli.

Meredith matriculated at Brasenose College, Oxford in 1821, aged 17, graduating B.A. in 1824, and M.A.in 1829. While at Oxford, he had come to an unofficial understanding of engagement with Disraeli's sister Sarah; it became official in mid-1830, as he and Disraeli set off on a tour of the Eastern Mediterranean, but IT was cut short by Meredith's death.

In 1828 Meredith undertook a journey to Scandinavia. In 1830 he attended a scientific lecture at the Royal Institution, which he found puzzling; and asked Sir Anthony Carlisle for support for election to the Royal Society. Later in the year, he was successful in standing there.

Meredith's last journey, with Disraeli, began in May 1830. They spent time in Spain. At Malta, which they reached at the end of August they met James Clay, with whom they were both acquainted, Meredith from Balliol. They sailed east in Clay's yacht to Corfu, at the end of September, called in at Yanina, and cruised in the Ionian Sea, reaching Athens on 24 November. At the end of December Meredith left the others in Constantinople to travel in Asia Minor. They joined up again in Alexandria, where Clay and Disraeli arrived on 12 March 1831.

As a return to England was planned at the end of June, in Cairo, Meredith fell ill with smallpox. He died there on 19 July 1831. His uncle had died just ten days prior (9 July 1831), and his father also died the same year.

== Works ==
In 1829, Meredith published Memorials of Charles John, King of Sweden and Norway. He wrote also, with Benjamin Disraeli, a version of the Rumpelstiltskin fairy tale, a verse melodrama under the title Rumpel Stilts Kin.

An account of a tour in 1824 with Isaac D'Israeli and Benjamin on the River Rhine was published privately by Meredith, as A Tour on the Rhine. He left two commonplace books, for 1828 and 1829–30. The latter contains anecdotes and encounters with various people, including George Cumberland, William Blake and Thomas Taylor, and shows the role in Meredith's life of the house of his wealthy uncle W. G. Meredith the elder. He left also a manuscript journal of his 1830–1 travels in Spain and eastwards with Disraeli, ex libris of Sir Philip Rose, 1st Baronet, together with copies of letters he had sent to his sister Georgiana Meredith.
