= Nicholas Oudart =

Flemish government official

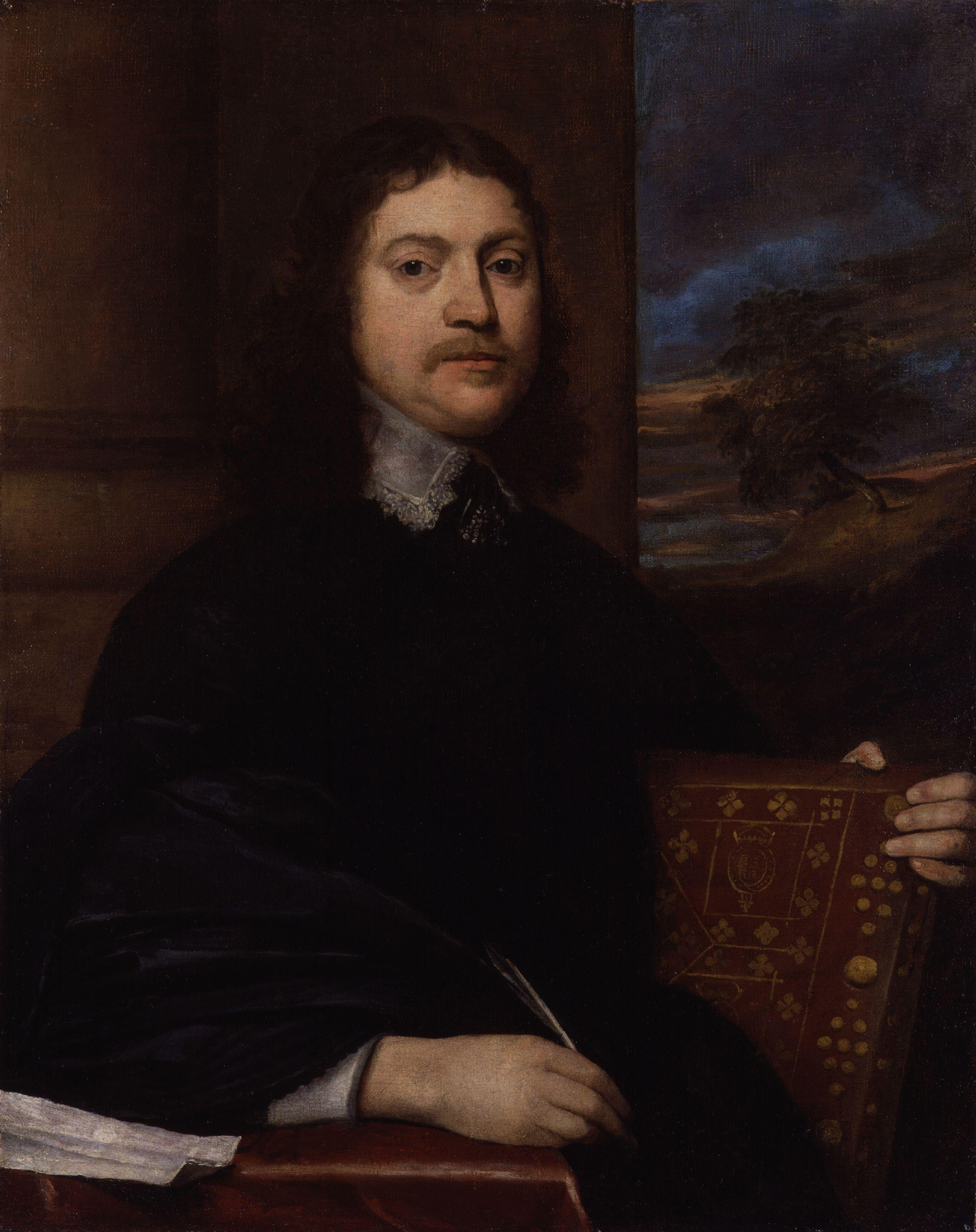
Nicholas Oudart, supposed portrait by William Dobson

Nicholas Oudart (died 1681) was a Flemish career official and courtier, who acted as secretary to Charles I and Charles II of England, and to William of Orange in the Netherlands.

== Life ==
Oudart was born in Mechelin, and was brought to England by Sir Henry Wotton for his household. He was created M.A. at Oxford on 13 August 1636, and was incorporated at Cambridge in 1639. He went on to study medicine and was created M.B. at Oxford on 31 January 1642.

In 1640, Oudart was at The Hague as secretary to Sir William Boswell, the English ambassador; in 1641 he became assistant secretary to Sir Edward Nicholas, Secretary of State. Sir Edward left England in 1646, but Oudart remained, sending Sir Edward letters with secret messages that used lemon juice as invisible ink. In August 1647, Oudart was acting as amanuensis to Charles I; he attended the king in the conferences with the parliamentary commissioners at Newport, Isle of Wight, and wrote the king's despatch to his son Charles.

Around 1651, Oudart became secretary to Princess Mary of Orange, a post he held until her death in 1661. Nicholas declared (about 1655) that Oudart's preferments had made him conceited. Returning to England, Oudart was admitted gentleman of the privy chamber on 18 November 1662; on 13 July 1666 he became Latin secretary to Charles II in succession to Sir Richard Fanshawe, and held the position to the end of his life. He made frequent journeys to the Netherlands. In February 1666 a warrant was ordered for the payment to Sir George Downing and his secretary Oudart of their expenses during their imprisonment in Holland, which had occurred when they were caught up in tit-for-tat of the Second Anglo-Dutch War.

Oudart was made a Fellow of the Royal Society in 1667, and knew John Evelyn and Samuel Pepys. He died in Little Dean's Yard, Westminster, and was buried in the west cloister of Westminster Abbey on 21 December 1681. His will, dated 5 March 1671–2, was proved on 13 July 1682 by his widow.

== Works ==
Francis Peck printed in his Desiderata Curiosa Oudart's eye-witness account of the Treaty of Newport negotiations of 1648 between King and Parliament. A copy of Eikon Basilike, in the handwriting of Oudart, was used by the printer Richard Royston.

== Family ==
Oudart married in 1655 Eva, daughter of John François Tortarolis, a wealthy gentlewoman of Leyden whom Oudart married about 1655. Of three daughters of the marriage, Barbara married at the Temple Church, London in 1677 William Foster; Amelia Isabella married in 1689 Bartholomew Van Sittert; and Dorothy is not known to have married.
