= John Bryce McLeod =

British mathematician

- Born: 23 December 1929; Aberdeen
- Died: 20 August 2014 (aged 84)
- Education: University of Aberdeen; Christ Church, Oxford
- Awards: Sir Edmund Whittaker Memorial Prize; Keith Medal; Naylor Prize and Lectureship; Fellow of the Royal Society of Edinburgh; Fellow of the Royal Society
- Scientific career
- Fields: Differential equations
- Institutions: University of Oxford; University of Edinburgh
- Thesis: Some Problems in the Theory of Eigenfunction Expansions (1959)
- Doctoral students: Gillian Slater

John Bryce McLeod, FRS FRSE (23 December 1929 – 20 August 2014) was a British mathematician, who worked on linear and nonlinear partial and ordinary differential equations.

== Life and education ==
McLeod was born in Aberdeen, Scotland, on 23 December 1929. He was educated at Aberdeen Grammar School; the University of Aberdeen, where he took a first in Mathematics and Natural Philosophy in 1950; and Christ Church, Oxford, where he took a first in Mathematics in 1952. He was a Harmsworth Senior Scholar at Merton College, Oxford, from 1955 to 1956. He obtained his PhD in 1959 under the supervision of Edward Charles Titchmarsh at the University of Oxford.

He was a junior lecturer in Mathematics at the University of Oxford from 1956 to 1958, and a lecturer in mathematics at the University of Edinburgh from 1958 to 1960. He then returned to Oxford to take up a Fellowship in Pure Mathematics at Wadham College. He remained in Oxford until 1988, becoming a university lecturer in 1970, and a senior research fellow of the Science and Engineering Research Council from 1986 to 1991. In 1988 McLeod took up a professorship at the University of Pittsburgh, where he remained until his retirement in 2007.

McLeod married Eunice Third in 1956; they had three sons and a daughter. He died in England on 20 August 2014, aged 84.

== Awards and honours ==
In 1965, he was awarded the Sir Edmund Whittaker Memorial Prize. he was elected a Fellow of the Royal Society of Edinburgh in 1974, and received the Society's Keith Medal in 1987. He was elected a Fellow of the Royal Society (FRS) in 1992.

In 2011 he was awarded the Naylor Prize and Lectureship.
