= Whitlock Nicoll =

English physician

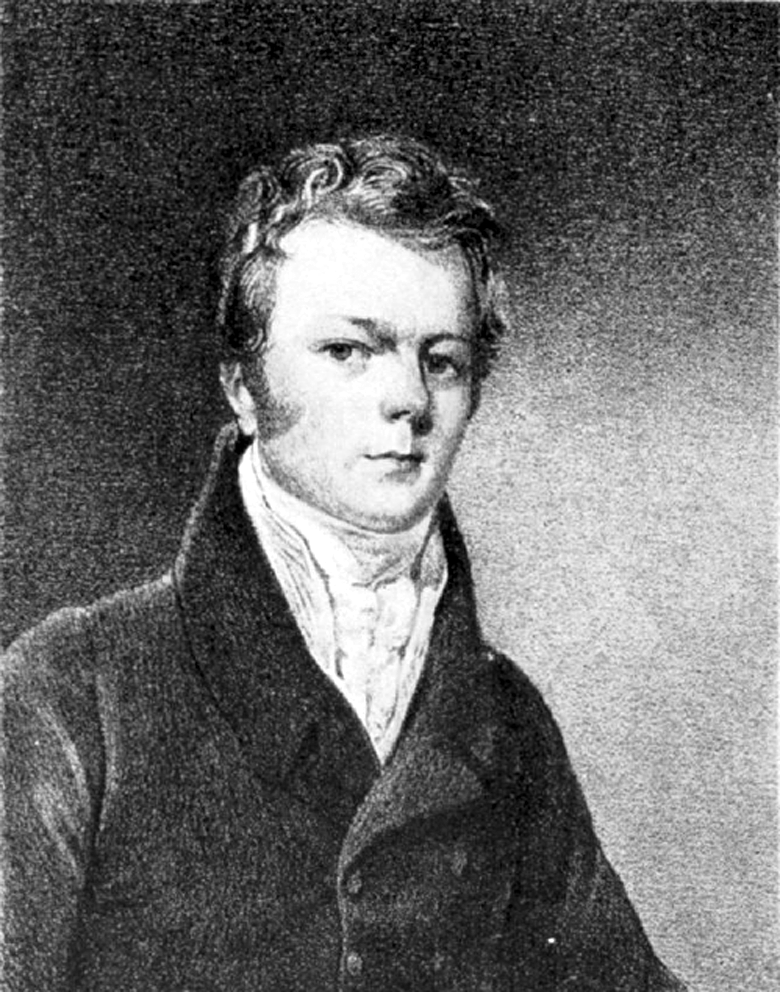
Whitlock Nicoll.

Whitlock Nicoll or Nicholl (1786–1838) was an English physician. Known in his lifetime as a medical and theological writer, he was also responsible in his capacity as physician to Michael Faraday for the term "electrode", a fact not known until well into the 20th century.

== Life ==
The son of the Rev. Iltyd Nicoll, he was born at Treddington, Worcestershire. His father was rector of the parish, and died before Nicoll was two years old; his mother was Ann, daughter of George Hatch of Windsor. He was educated by the Rev. John Nicoll, his uncle, and placed in 1802 to live with John Bevan, a medical practitioner at Cowbridge, Glamorgan.

In 1806 Nicoll became a student at St George's Hospital, and in 1809 received the diploma of membership of the College of Surgeons of England. He then became partner of his former teacher Bevan at Cowbridge, and engaged in general practice. He went to live in Ludlow, Shropshire, took an M.D. degree 17 May 1816 at Marischal College, Aberdeen, and was admitted an extra-licentiate of the College of Physicians of London 8 June 1816. He commenced physician, and received in 1817 the degree of M.D. from the Archbishop of Canterbury. He became a member of the Royal Irish Academy.

On 17 March 1826 Nicoll graduated M.D. at Glasgow University, then moved to London, and was admitted a licentiate of the College of Physicians on 26 June 1826. He attained some success in practice, and was elected Fellow of the Royal Society on 18 February 1830. Around 1834 when Michael Faraday was looking to introduce terminology for electrolysis, he took up suggestions of Nicoll and William Whewell.

In 1835 Nicoll gave up practice, and settled at Wimbledon, Surrey, where he died on 3 December 1838.

== Works ==
Nicoll began to write aon medicine in the London Medical Repository in 1819; his first separate publication, Tentamen Nosologicum had already appeared there, a general classification of diseases based upon their symptoms. The History of the Human Œconomy appeared in 1819, and suggests a general physiological method of inquiry in clinical medicine. Primary Elements of Disordered Circulation of the Blood was also published in 1819. General Elements of Pathology’ appeared in 1820, and in 1821 Practical Remarks on the Disordered States of the Cerebral Structures in Infants. This was first read before an association of physicians in Ireland on 6 December 1819; he proposed that erethism of the cranial brain is due to impressions on the anticerebral extremities of nerves, but this theory went beyond his actual observations. He published two ophthalmic—one of imperfection of vision, the other of colour-blindness—in the Medico-Chirurgical Transactions, vols. vii. and ix.

The taste for Hebrew and for theology which he acquired in boyhood from the learned uncle who educated him remained through life. Influenced by his uncle, Nicoll published five theological treatises during his lifetime:

- An Analysis of Christianity, London, 1823; ‘
- Nugæ Hebraicæ and Nature the Preacher, 1837;
- Remarks on the Breaking and Eating of Bread and Drinking of Wine in Commemoration of the Passion of Christ, London, 1837;
- An Inquiry into the Nature and Prospects of the Adamite Race, London, 1838.

He left theological works in manuscript, which were published in 1841, with a short sketch of his life.

== Family ==
Nicoll married:

- in 1812, Margaret, daughter of Rev. Robert Rickards, who died 1831;
- in 1832, Charlotte, daughter of James Deacon Hume, who died of puerperal fever.
