= Guillaume Mazeas =

French physicist (1720–1775)

Father Guillaume Mazeas
- Born: 2 August 1720; Vannes
- Died: 13 September 1775 (aged 55); Vannes
- Scientific career
- Fields: physics, chemistry, geology
- Patrons: Adrien Maurice de Noailles

Father Guillaume Mazeas (French: Abbé Guillaume Mazéas; 2 August 1720 – 13 September 1775) was a translator of English scientific works into French, a corresponding member of the French Academy of Sciences and a fellow of the Royal Society. He was canon of the cathedral of Vannes, France. He corresponded with Stephen Hales on scientific matters, including his experiences with the lightning rod invented by Benjamin Franklin. His investigations of red dyeing in the East Indies and their improvement in France were of significant industrial value.
