= Mark Mayer =

American medical researcher

Mark Mayer FRS
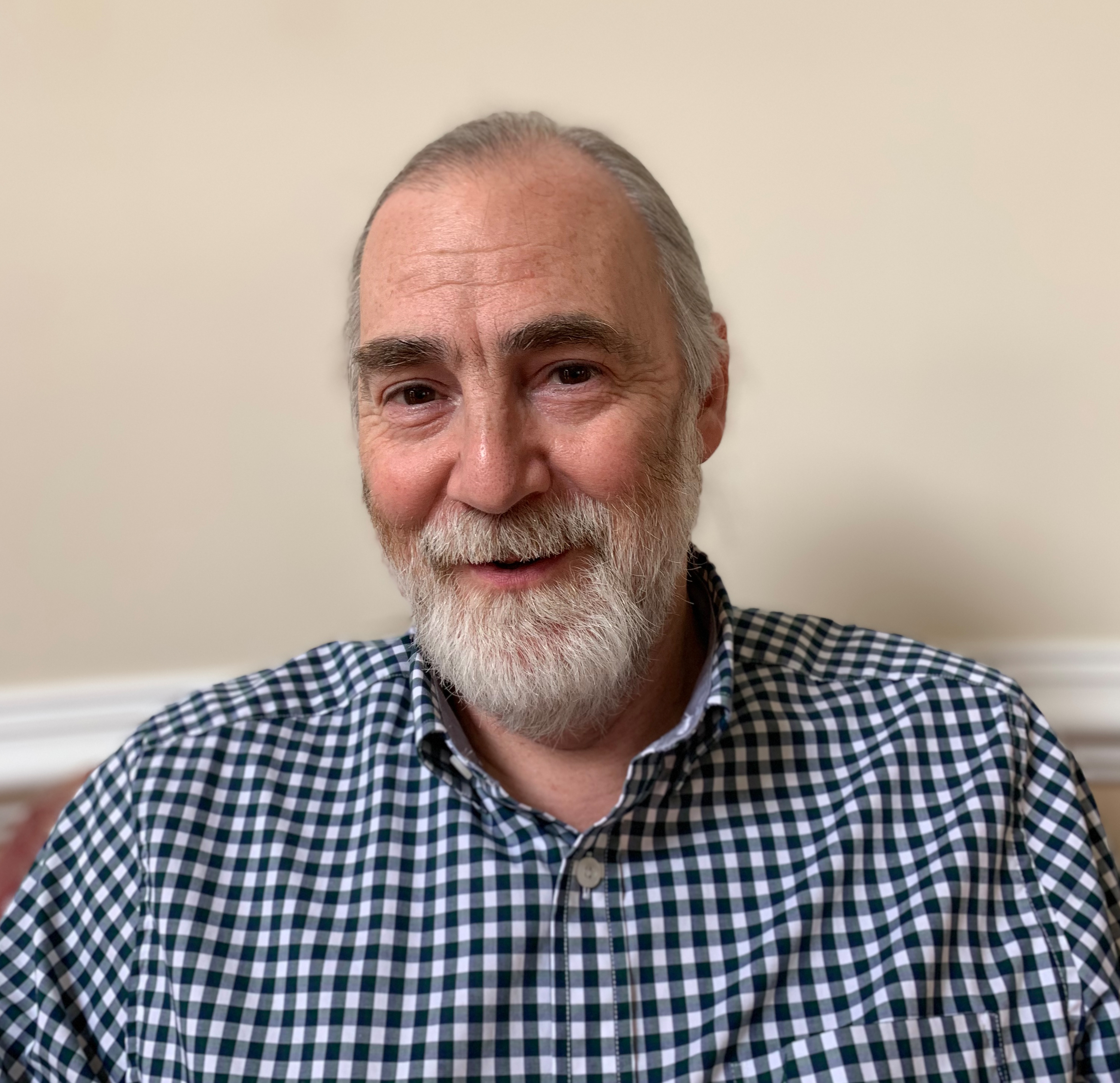
- Born: Mark Lee Mayer
- Education: University of Bristol (BSc); University of London (PhD)
- Awards: Harkness Fellowship
- Scientific career
- Fields: Biophysics; Ion channels Structural biology Glutamate receptors
- Workplaces: National Institutes of Health
- Thesis: Inhibitory synaptic mechanisms and transmitter candidates in the rostral hypothalamus of the rat (1980)
- Website: irp.nih.gov/pi/mark-mayer

Mark Lee Mayer FRS is scientist emeritus at the National Institutes of Health (NIH). His research investigates glutamate receptor ion channels, the major mediators of excitatory synapses in the brain. He has made numerous observations that have changed our view of receptor function and neurotransmission in the brain. Major findings include discovery of the block of NMDA receptors by extracellular Mg and their high Ca permeability; analysis of the permeation and block of Ca permeable AMPA and kainate receptors by cytoplasmic polyamines; and structural studies on ligand binding, allosteric modulation, and gating using X-ray diffraction and cryoelectron microscopy.

== Education ==
Mayer was educated at the University of Bristol, graduating with a BSc 1st class Hons in Pharmacology in 1977, and the University of London where he was awarded a PhD in Neuropharmacology in 1980. He did postdoctoral training in biophysics at the NIH, and spent a year at Columbia University New York training in structural biology with Eric Gouaux.

== Career and research ==
Mayer's research interests are in Biophysics, Glutamate receptors, Structural biology and Ion channels.

=== Awards and honours ===
Mayer was awarded a Harkness Fellowship in 1980, a Beit Memorial Fellowship in 1982, and the Society for Neuroscience young investigator award in 1979. He was elected a Fellow of the Royal Society (FRS) in 2019 for "substantial contribution to the improvement of natural knowledge".
