= Leslie Sydney Dennis Morley =

Professor Les Morley FRS FREng FRAeS
- Born: Leslie Sydney Dennis Morley; May 23, 1924
- Died: June 16, 2011 (aged 87)
- Awards: FRS (1992); FREng; FRAeS
- Scientific career
- Institutions: Brunel University London

Leslie Sydney Dennis Morley (23 May 1924 — 16 June 2011) was a Professorial Research fellow at the Brunel Institute of Computational Mathematics (BICOM) in London and the author of the book Skew plates and structures.

== Awards and honours ==
Morley was elected a Fellow of the Royal Society (FRS) in 1992. His certificate of election reads:

Distinguished and internationally recognised for his extensive researches in structural analysis, particularly in the field of aeronautics. He is known especially for his pioneering work in shell and plate theory as exemplified by the widely known Morely shell equations and the fundamentally intriguing Morley plate triangle. His numerous researches also range over such topics as the finite element method, 'practical tensors', variational principles and skewness in structures, in all of which he has made important and practically significant advances.

Morley was also elected a fellow of the Royal Academy of Engineering and Royal Aeronautical Society.
