= Edward Nourse (surgeon) =

English surgeon

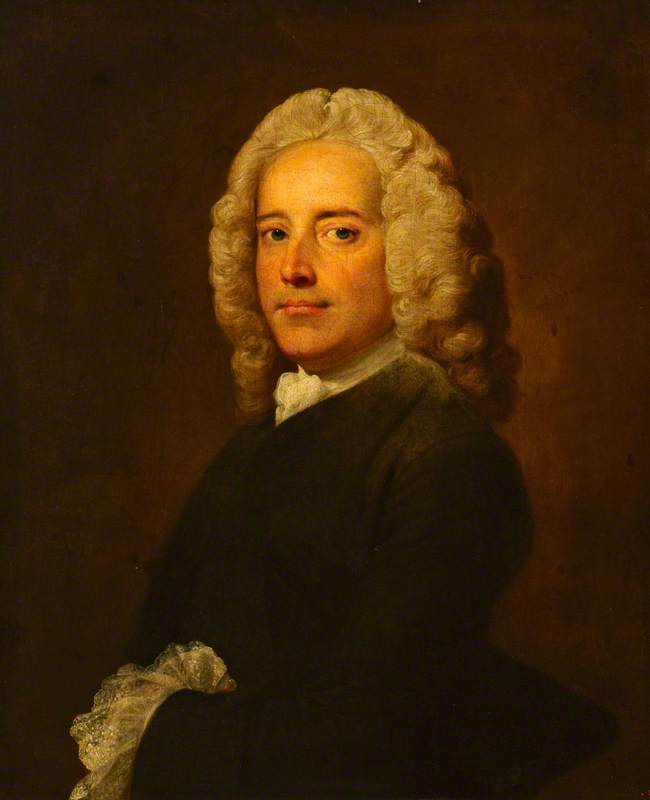
Edward Nourse the Younger, painting attributed to Joseph Highmore

Edward Nourse, FRS (1701–1761) was an English surgeon.

== Family ==
His father, also called Edward Nourse (d. 1738) was a surgeon in Oxford. His mother was Elizabeth Towersey (1680–1740). His brother was John Nourse the bookseller. Another brother, Charles Nourse, was a doctor in Oxford who took over their father's practice in that town.

== Career ==
On 2 December 1717, he was apprenticed until 1725 to John Dobyns, an assistant surgeon at St Bartholomew's Hospital, London. Nourse became an Assistant Surgeon himself in 1731 and Surgeon in 1745.

He was elected to the Royal Society on 24 October 1728.

He was a member of the Barber-Surgeons' Company in which he was a Demonstrator in Anatomy from 1731 until 1734.
