= Mayo (surname) =

Mayo is an English and Spanish surname. Notable people with the surname include:

- Abdul Ghafoor Khan Mayo, provincial minister in Punjab
- Aimee Mayo (born 1971), American songwriter
- Americus Mayo (died 1891), American politician, state legislator in Arkansas
- Archie Mayo (1891–1968), American movie director and stage actor
- Arthur Mayo (naval officer) (1840–1920), recipient of the Victoria Cross
- Arthur Mayo (politician) (1936–2015), American politician
- Barry Mayo, radio executive
- Bernard Mayo (1921–2000), philosopher
- Bertram Chapman Mayo (1865–1920), American newspaper promoter
- Bill Mayo, American college football player
- Bob Mayo (1951–2004), American musician
- Brad Mayo (born 1980), American politician
- Brooke Mayo, American soccer assistant referee
- Charles Mayo (disambiguation)
- Christine Mayo (1884–1963), American silent film actress
- Coby Mayo (born 2001), American baseball player
- Danny Mayo (1950–1999), American songwriter
- David Mayo (born 1991), American football player
- Deron Mayo (born 1988), American football player
- Dysin Mayo (born 1996), Canadian ice hockey player
- E. L. Mayo (1904–1979), American poet
- Ed Mayo, Secretary General of Co-operatives UK
- Eddie Mayo (1910–2006), American baseball player
- Edith Mayo (born 1940), American historian
- Elton Mayo (1880–1949), Australian psychologist and sociologist
- Frank Mayo (stage actor) (1839–1896), American actor and comedian
- Frank Mayo (film actor) (1889–1963), American silent screen actor
- Frank R. Mayo (1908–1987), polymer chemist, known for Mayo–Lewis equation
- Gabby Mayo (born 1989), American sprinter
- George Mayo (1807–1894), Australian medical practitioner
- Gilmar Mayo (born 1969), Colombian high jumper
- Gypie Mayo John Phillip Cawthra (1951–2013), English guitarist and songwriter
- Helen Mayo (1878–1967), Australian women's health pioneer
- Henry Mayo (cricketer) (1847–1891), English cricketer
- Henry Mayo (minister) (1733–1793), English dissenting minister and tutor
- Henry T. Mayo (1856–1937), American admiral
- Herbert Mayo (1796–1888), British physiologist, anatomist and medical writer
- Herbert Mayo (judge) (1885–1972), South Australian jurist
- Iban Mayo (born 1977), bicycle racer
- Isaac Mayo (1794–1861), United States Navy officer
- Isaac Mayo (Surfman USCG), 19th century junior surfman in the US Life-Saving Service, a predecessor of the Coast Guard
- Isabella Fyvie Mayo (1843–1914), Scottish poet, novelist
- Jalen Mayo, American football player
- Janet Mayo (1915–1995), South Australian activist for war widows
- Jerod Mayo (born 1986), American football coach and former player
- Joaquín Loyo Mayo (1945–2014), Mexican tennis player
- John Mayo (disambiguation)
- Josh Mayo (born 1987), American basketball player
- Katherine Mayo (1867–1940), American writer and journalist
- Lewis Mayo (politician) (1828–1907), American physician, lawyer, and politician
- Lewis Mayo (footballer) (born 2000), Scottish football player
- Lito Mayo (1955–1983), Philippine artist
- Margaret Mayo (playwright) (1882–1951), American playwright and actress
- Margaret Mayo (children's author), (1935 — 2022), English children's literature and folktales writer
- Margaret Mayo (novelist) (born 1936), English romance novelist
- Margarita de Mayo Izarra (1889–1969), Spanish writer
- Matthew P. Mayo, American fiction and non-fiction writer
- Michael Mayo (disambiguation)
- O. J. Mayo (born 1987), American basketball player
- Paige Mayo (born 1986), American wrestling personality
- Patrick Mayo (born 1973), South African football player
- Paul Mayo (born 1981), English football player
- Rahn Mayo, American politician
- Ron Mayo (born 1950) American football player
- Richard Mayo (disambiguation)
- Robert Murphy Mayo (1836–1896), American politician from Virginia
- Robert H. Mayo, British aircraft designer of the Short Mayo Composite aircraft
- Sarah Jim Mayo (1858–1918), Washoe basket weaver
- Sardar Tufail Ahmad Khan Mayo (born 1943), Pakistani politician
- Tariq Shabbir Khan Mayo, Pakistani legislator
- Thomas Mayo (disambiguation), several people
- Simon Mayo (born 1958), disc jockey
- Virginia Mayo (1920–2005), American actress
- Whitman Mayo (1930–2001), American actor
- William Mayo (disambiguation)
- Zeke Mayo, American college basketball player

== See also ==
- Arthur Mayo-Robson (1853–1933), English surgeon
- Richmond Mayo-Smith (1854–1901), American economist
