= John Mayo =

John Mayo may refer to:

- John Mayo (minister) (died 1676), Puritan minister in pre-revolutionary Boston, Massachusetts
- John Mayo (physician) (1761–1818), English doctor
- John Mayo (cricketer) (1822–1899), English cricketer
- John C. C. Mayo (1864–1914), American entrepreneur, educator and politician
- John S. Mayo (born 1930), American engineer
- John "Gypie" Mayo (1951–2013), British musician
