= Charles Mayo =

Charles Mayo may refer to:

- Charles Horace Mayo (1865–1939), American physician
- Charles Herbert Mayo (1845–1929), English antiquarian
- Charles William Mayo (1898–1968), American surgeon
- Charles Mayo (cricketer) (1903–1943), Canadian-born English cricketer
- Charles Mayo (Anglo-Saxon scholar) (1767–1858), Rawlinson and Bosworth Professor of Anglo-Saxon at the University of Oxford
- Charles Mayo (golfer), English professional golfer
