= Diableries =

19th-century French satirical stereoscopic photographs

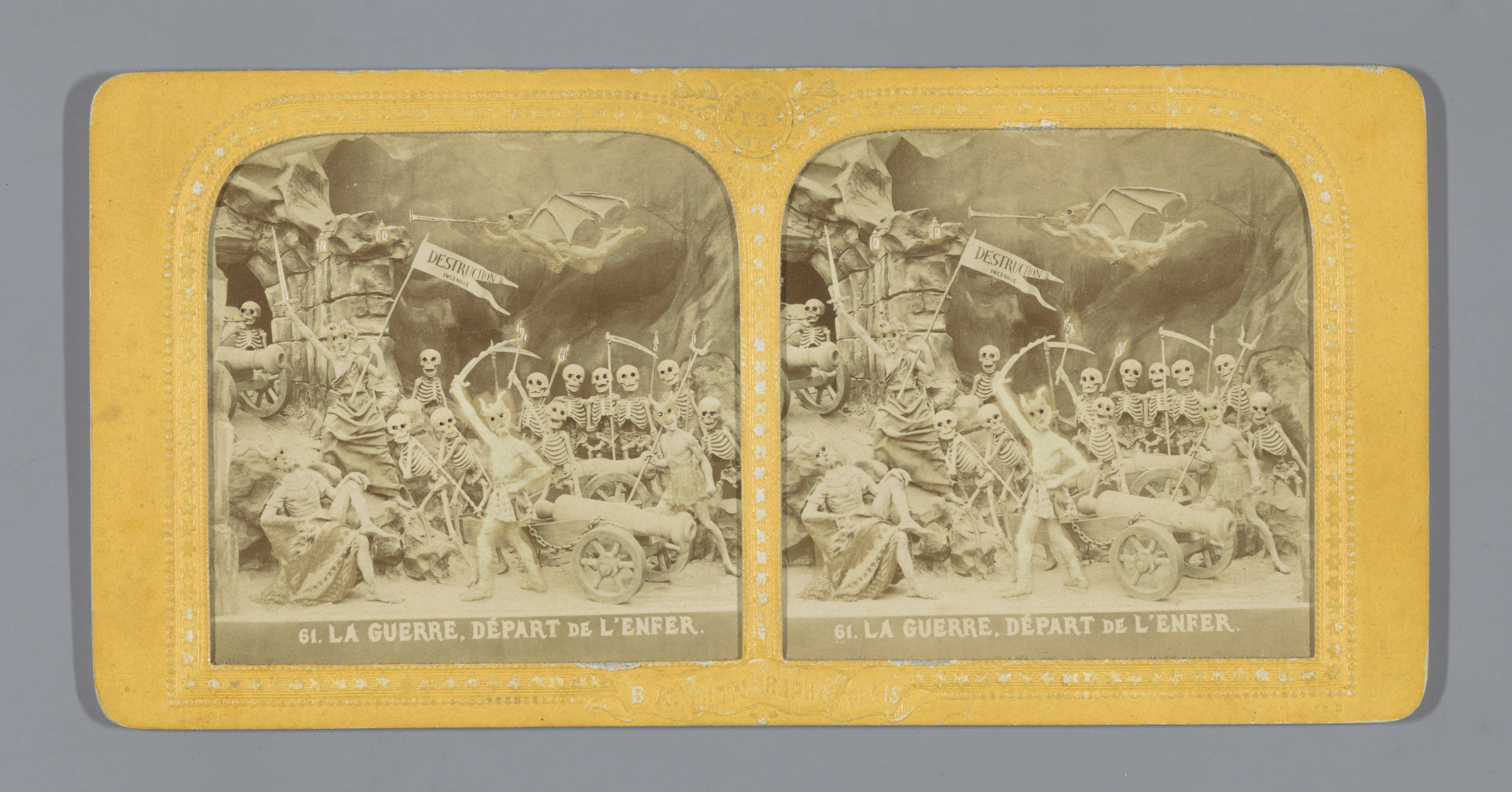
Stereoview number 61, La Guerre, départ de l'Enfer (War, Departure from Hell)

Diableries is a series of stereoscopic photographs published in Paris during the 1860s. The photographs, known as stereoviews, portray sculpted clay vignettes depicting scenes of daily life in hell. Much of the subject matter was satirical and mirrored the corruption and excess of Paris during the Second Empire. Napoleon III's authoritarian rule was repeatedly the subject of criticism, as was the decadent lifestyle of the bourgeoisie.

== Creation and publication ==
At least three sculptors are known to have created vignettes for the series: Louis Alfred Habert, Pierre Adolph Hennetier, and Louis-Edmond Cougny. The series was originally published by François Benjamin Lamiche but was later taken over and expanded by the publisher Adolphe Block. A total of 72 scenes were published by Block. Many similar stereoviews, though of lesser quality, were published by Block's competitor Jules Marinier.

== Construction ==
The photographs were reverse colored by hand, then backed with a layer of tissue paper and sandwiched between two double window cardboard mattes. This format of stereoview is known as a "tissue view" or "hold-to-light view" and is similar to modern slides or transparencies. For added effect, the eyes of the skeletons and various other creatures were pierced and dabbed with colored gelatin, causing their eyes to glow red. The final product was then viewed through a stereoscope which produced a realistic 3D effect.

== Gallery ==
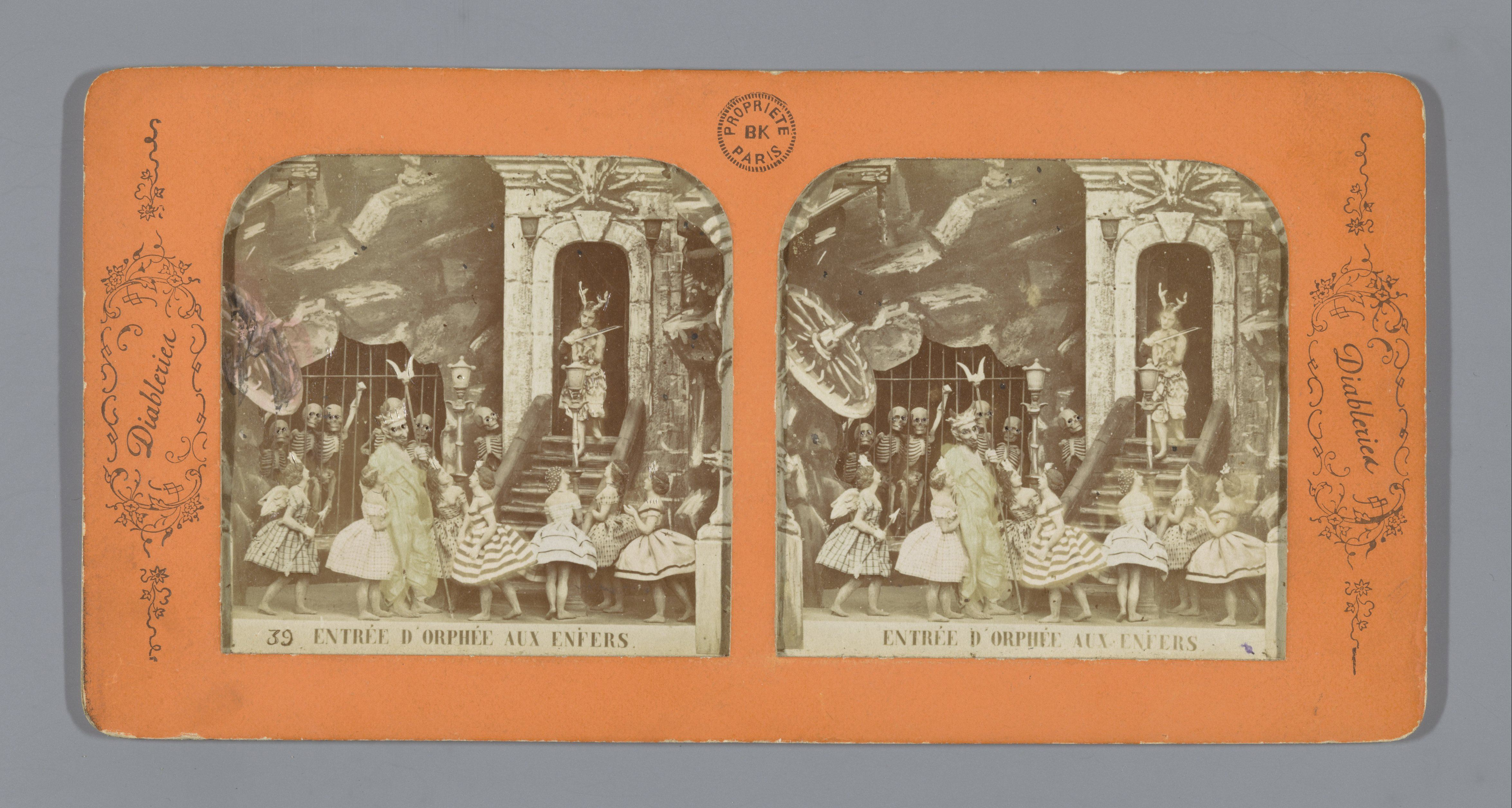
« 39. Entrée d'Orphée aux Enfers »
("Orpheus's Entrance to Hell")

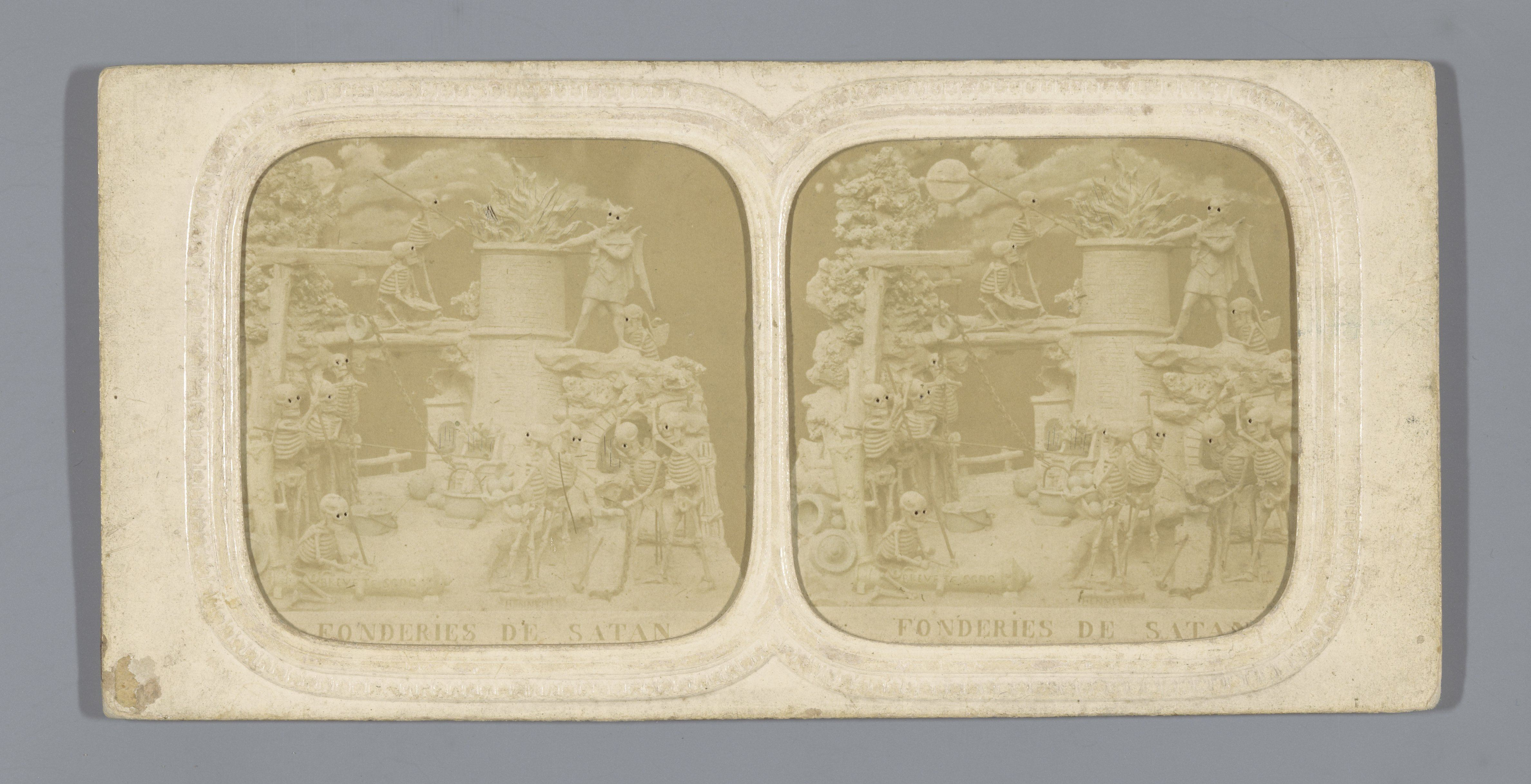
« Fonderies de Satan »
("Satan's Foundries")

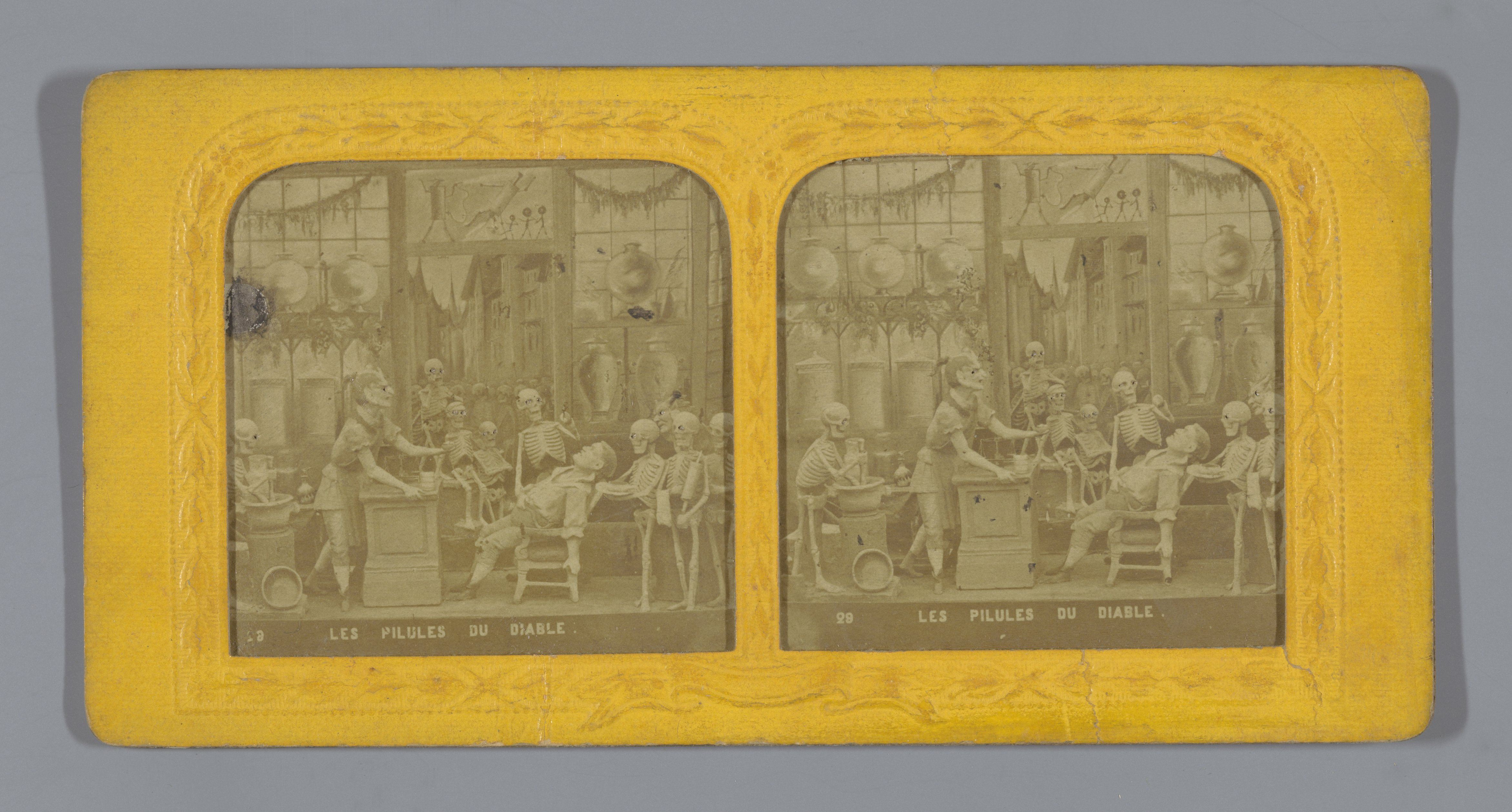
« 29. Les Pilules du Diable »
("The Devil's Pills")

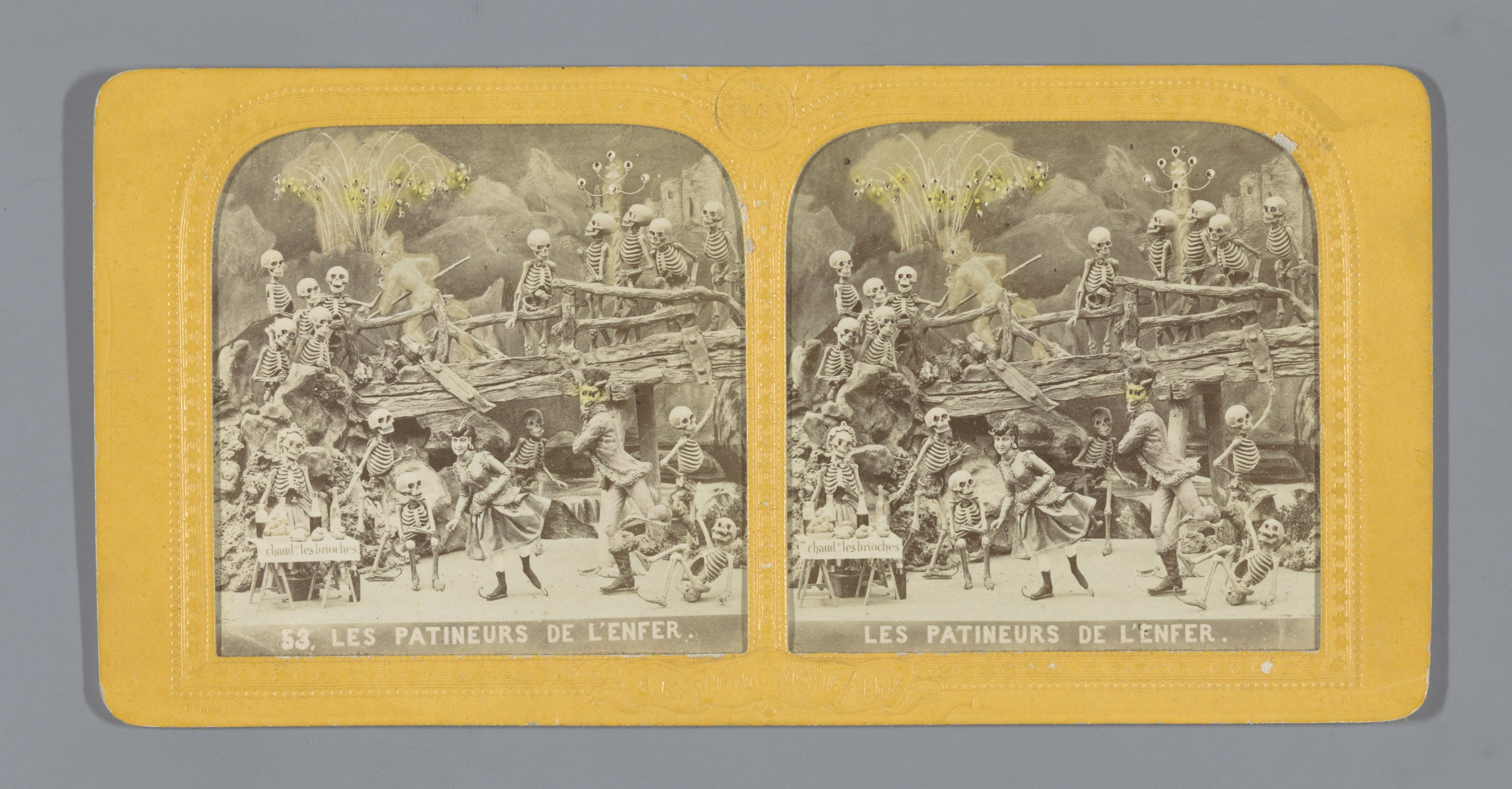
« 53. Les Patineurs de l'Enfer »
("The Skaters of Hell")

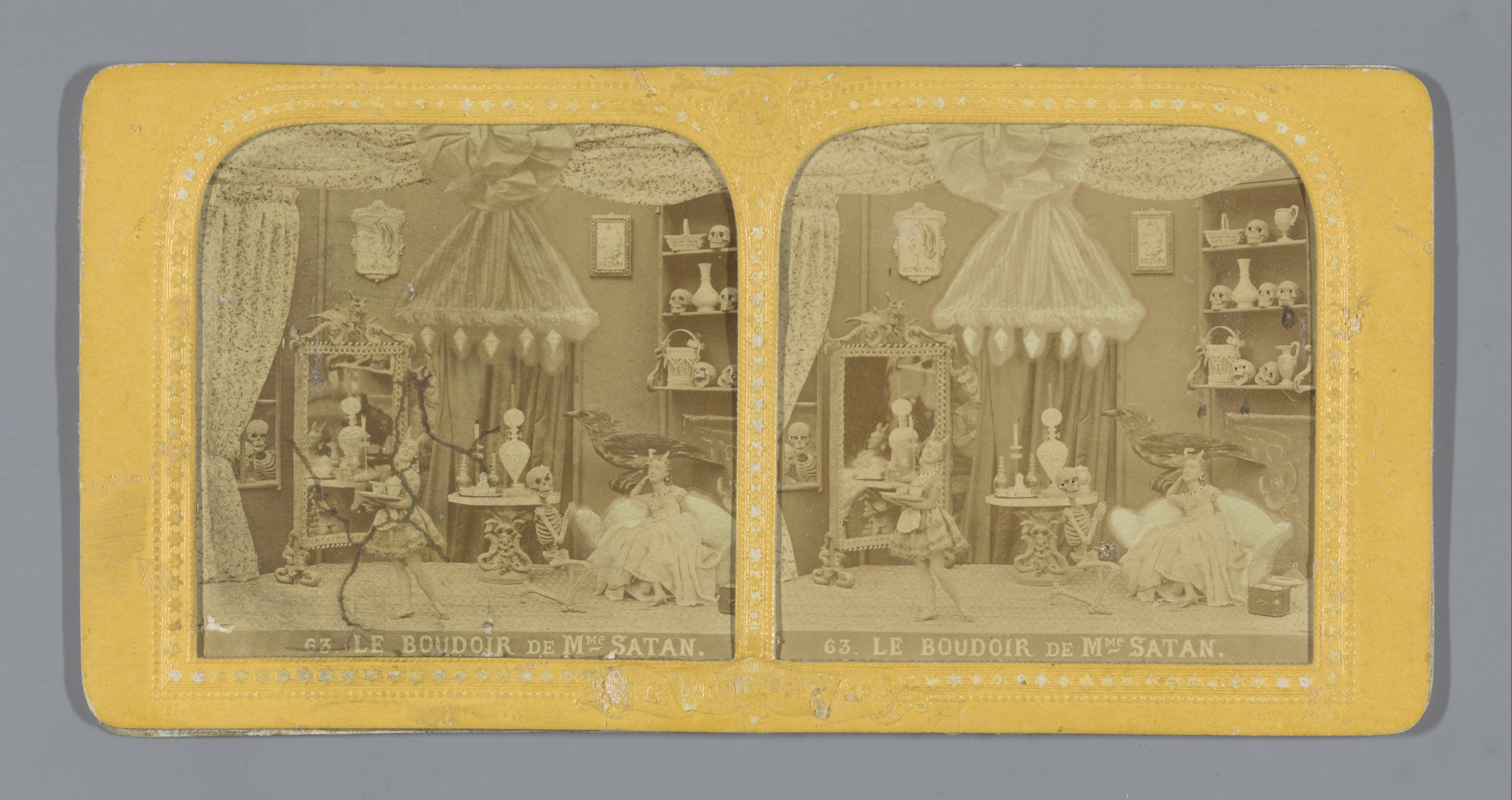
« 63. Le Boudoir de Mme Satan »
("The Boudoir of Mrs. Satan")

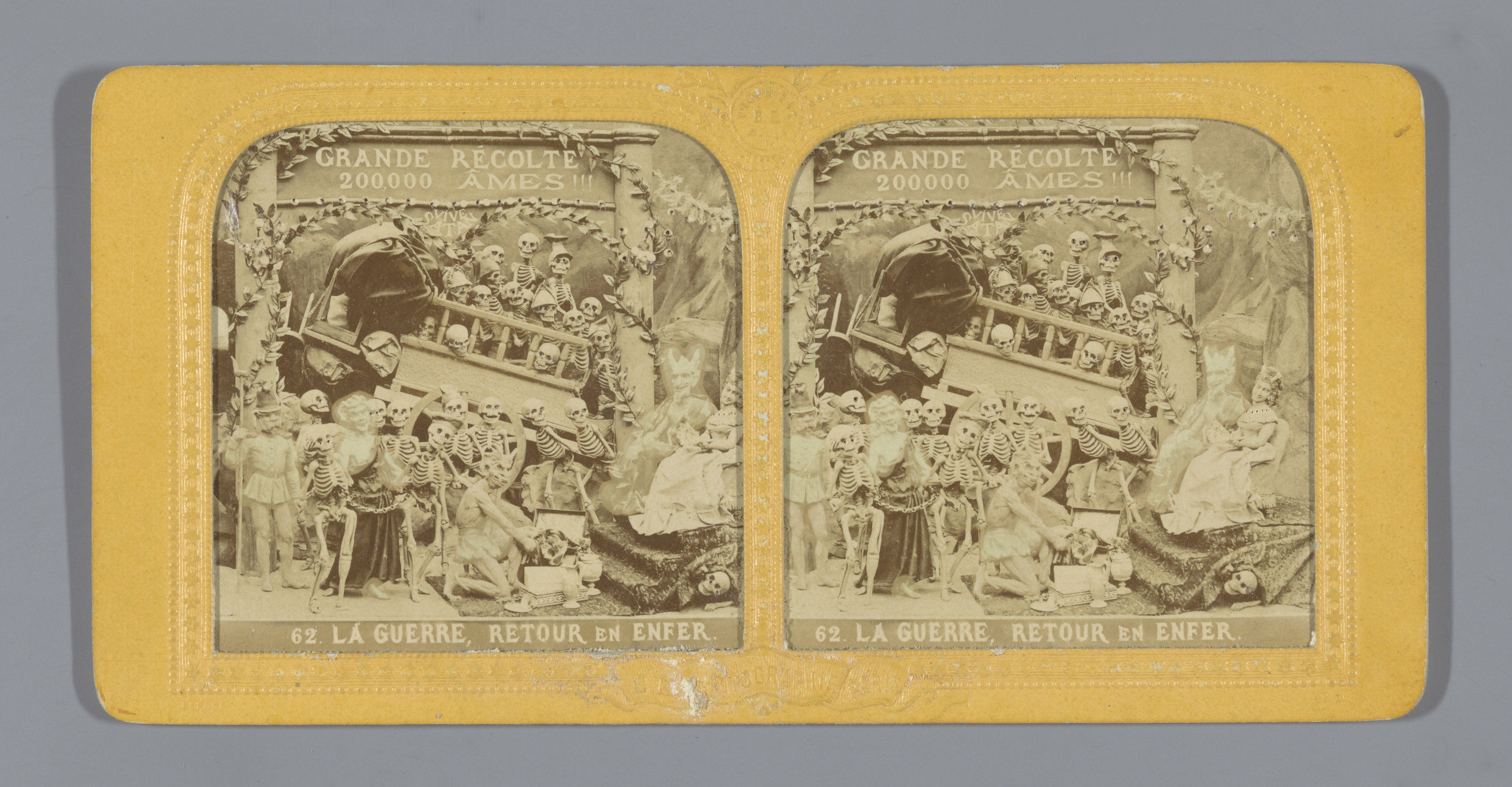
« 62. La Guerre, retour en Enfer »
("War, Return to Hell")

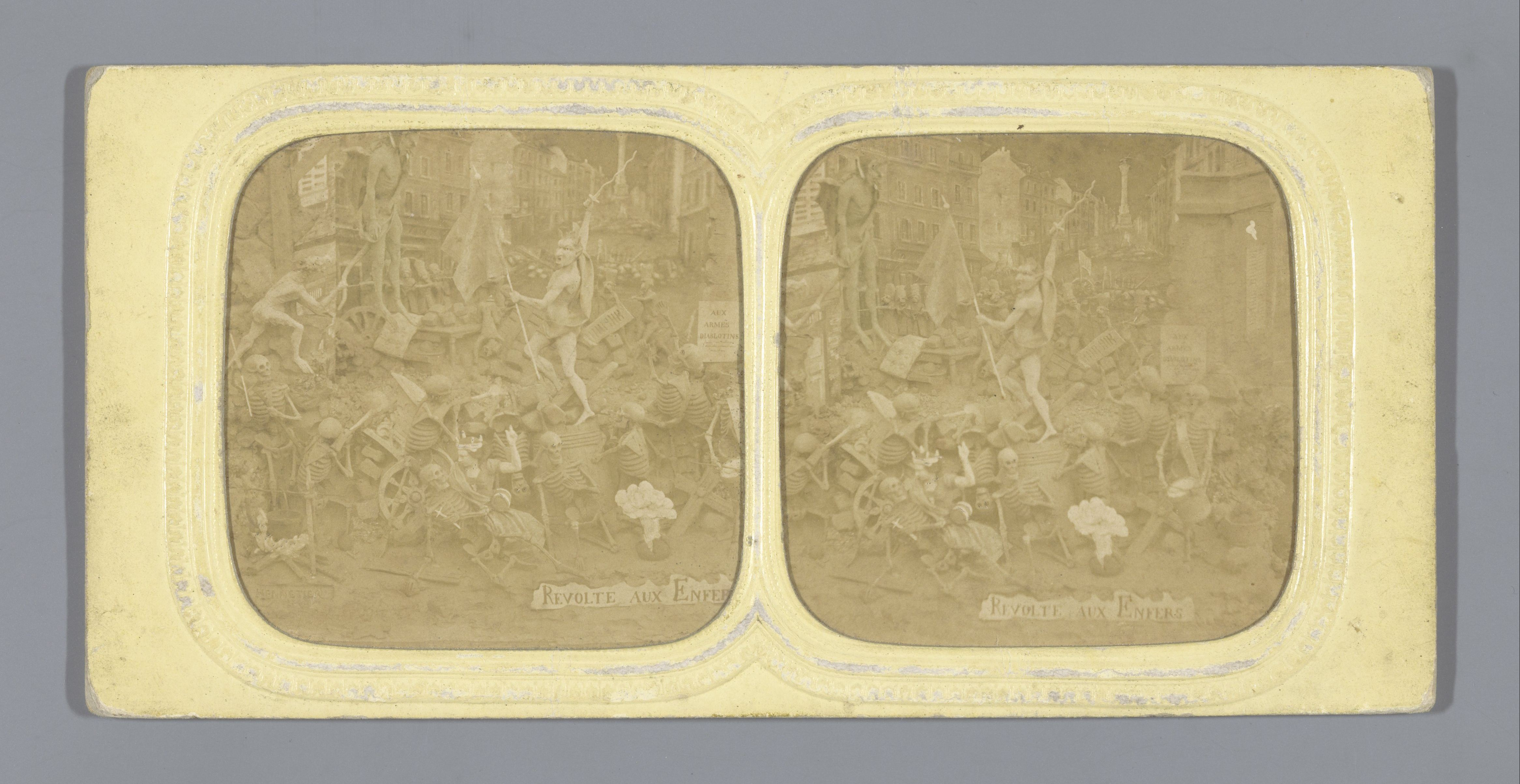
« Révolte aux Enfers »
("Revolt in Hell")

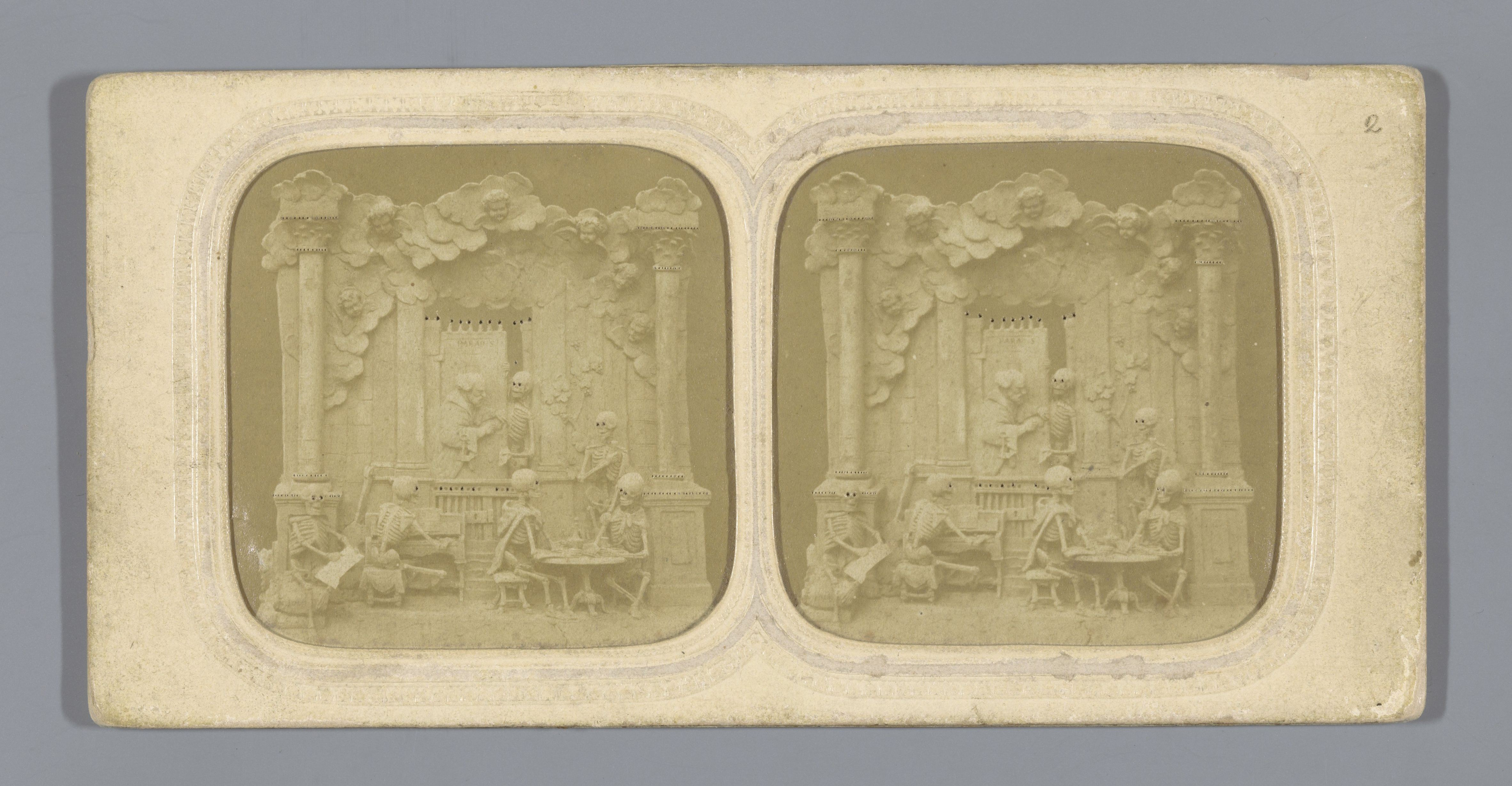
Untitled (card players and musicians)
