= Thomas Mayo =

Thomas Mayo may refer to:

- Thomas Mayo (gridiron football) (born 1990), American football wide receiver
- Thomas Mayo (author), Indigenous Australian campaigner for the Indigenous Voice to Parliament
- Thomas Mayo (physician) (1790–1871), British physician
