= William Mayo =

William Mayo may refer to:

- William Benson Mayo (1866–1944), chief power engineer of the Ford Motor Company
- Two of the co-founders of the Mayo Clinic:
  - William Worrall Mayo (1819–1911), British-American medical doctor and chemist, father of William James Mayo
  - William James Mayo (1861–1939), American physician and surgeon
- William Starbuck Mayo (1812–1895), American doctor, traveler and writer
- William Mayo (civil engineer) (c. 1685–1744), who laid out the city of Richmond, Virginia
- William B. Mayo (politician), American doctor, businessman, and politician from Vermont

== See also ==
- Bill Mayo (born 1963), American football player
