= Richard Mayo =

Richard Mayo may refer to:

- Richard W. Mayo (1902–1996), American modern pentathlete, brigadier general, and city manager
- Richard Mayew (died 1516), also written Richard Mayo, Bishop of Hereford
- Richard Mayo (minister) (1631–1695), nonconformist pastor
- Richard Bourke, 6th Earl of Mayo (1822–1872)
