= John Mayo (physician) =

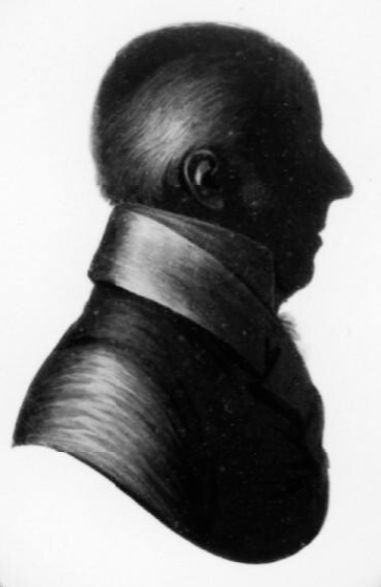
John Myers, 1818 silhouette

John Mayo (1761–1818) was an English physician.

== Life ==
The son of Thomas Mayo, and grandson of Charles Mayo of Hereford, he was born in Hereford 10 December 1761. He matriculated at Oxford in 1778 at Brasenose College, and graduated B.A. 1782. He was elected Fellow of Oriel College 16 April 1784, and proceeded M.A. 1785, M.B. 1787, and M.D. 1788.

Mayo became Fellow of the Royal College of Physicians of London 30 September 1789, and was censor in 1790, 1795, 1804, and 1808. He was Harveian orator in 1795. He served as physician to the Foundling Hospital from July 1787 to 1809, to the Middlesex Hospital 6 November 1788 until 11 January 1803, and was also physician in ordinary to the Princess of Wales. From 1802 the Middlesex Hospital made him physician extraordinary to their cancer ward.

Coming to divide his time between London and Tunbridge Wells, Mayo resided at the latter during the summer months, where he was the leading physician. On resigning his hospital appointments in 1817, he settled at Tunbridge Wells, and dying 29 November 1818, was buried at Speldhurst, Kent.

== Works ==
Mayo published The Information and Complaint made to the Court at the Hospital for the Maintenance and Education of exposed and deserted Children, 1790. His eldest son Thomas published Remarks on Insanity, founded on the Practice of John Mayo, M.D., 1817. Mayo had been physician to Ticehurst House Hospital, and Thomas continued in the post.

== Family ==
Mayo married twice. With his first wife, Jane, daughter of Thomas Cock, esq., of Tottenham, he had three sons: Thomas, a physician; John, in holy orders; and Herbert. His second wife was Frances Lavinia, daughter of William Fellowes of Ramsey Abbey, Member of Parliament for Ludlow and Andover.
