= Charles Mayo (cricketer) =

Canadian-English cricketer

Personal information
- Full name: Charles Thomas Worsfold Mayo
- Born: 5 February 1903; Victoria, British Columbia, Canada
- Died: 10 April 1943 (aged 40) near Alexandria, British Egypt
- Batting: Right-handed

Domestic team information
- Years: Team
- 1928: Somerset

Career statistics
Competition	First-class
Matches	6
Runs scored	193
Batting average	21.44
100s/50s	–/1
Top score	60
Catches/stumpings	3/–
- Source: CricketArchive, 14 October 2011

Charles Thomas Worsfold Mayo (5 February 1903 – 10 April 1943) was a Canadian-born British cricketer who played six first-class matches for Somerset in 1928.

Educated at Eton College, where he was in the cricket team alongside Gubby Allen, Mayo was a right-handed batsman who featured in the Somerset middle order in six matches in the early part of the 1928 season. He made 35 and 60, his highest score, in his first match against Nottinghamshire at Trent Bridge. And in the next game, against Warwickshire at Edgbaston, he made 48. But he was not successful in his other games and did not appear in first-class cricket again.

He was killed during the North African campaign in the Second World War.
