= John Mayo (cricketer) =

English cricketer and British Army officer

Personal information
- Full name: John Pole Mayo
- Born: 12 August 1822; Wotton, Surrey, England
- Died: 23 March 1899 (aged 76); Notting Hill, Middlesex, England

Domestic team information
- Years: Team
- 1850: Middlesex
- 1850–1851: Marylebone Cricket Club

Career statistics
Competition	First-class
Matches	6
Runs scored	63
Batting average	6.30
100s/50s	–/–
Top score	22
Catches/stumpings	2/–
- Source: Cricinfo, 19 September 2021

John Pole Mayo (12 August 1822 — 23 March 1899) was an English first-class cricketer and British Army officer.

Mayo was born in August 1822 at Tankurst Park near Wotton, Surrey. He made his debut in first-class cricket for Middlesex against Surrey at The Oval in 1850. Mayo played in a further five first-class matches in 1850 and 1851, all for the Marylebone Cricket Club, playing three against the varsity sides Oxford and Cambridge, as well as a match each against Middlesex and the Surrey Club. He scored 63 runs in his six first-class matches, with a highest score of 22. Besides playing first-class cricket, Mayo also served in the British Army, having purchased the rank of ensign in the 18th Regiment of Foot. He transferred to the 74th Regiment of Foot in June 1845, at which point he was promoted to lieutenant. Mayo was also a member of the Royal Geographical Society, being elected as a fellow in May 1858. Mayo died at Notting Hill in March 1899.
