= Thomas Mayo (physician) =

British physician (1790–1871)

Thomas Mayo (24 January 1790 – 13 January 1871) was a British physician.

He was born in London, the son of John Mayo, MD. After three years of private tuition and eighteen months at Westminster School, he was again privately tutored for Oriel College, Oxford, where he qualified MB in 1815 and MD in 1818. He took over his father's successful practice in Tunbridge Wells, but in 1835 removed to London where he acted for many years as physician at the Marylebone Infirmary.

He was elected a Fellow of the Royal College of Physicians in 1819 and delivered their Lumleian lectures in 1839 and 1842, their Harveian oration in 1841, and their Croonian Lecture in 1853. From 1857 to 1862 he was president of the college.

He was elected a Fellow of the Royal Society in 1835.

He died in 1871 in Corsham, Wiltshire.

== Bibliography ==
- Remarks on Insanity, founded on the practice of John Mayo, M.D., and tending to illustrate the physical symptoms and treatment of the disease. 8vo. Lond. 1817.
- An Essay on the Influence of Temperament in modifying Dyspepsia or Indigestion. 8vo. Lond. 1831.
- Elements of the Pathology of the Human Mind. 12mo. Lond. 1838.
- Clinical Facts and Reflections, with Remarks on the Impunity of Murder in some cases of presumed Insanity. 8vo. Lond. 1847.
- Outlines of Medical Proof. 8vo. Lond. 1848.
- Sequel to Outlines of Medical Proof. 8vo. Lond. 1848.
- Outlines of Medical Proof revised, with Remarks on its application to certain forms of Irregular Medicine. 12mo. Lond. 1850.
- Medical Testimony and Evidence in Cases of Lunacy, being the Croonian lectures for 1853, with an Essay on the Conditions of Mental Soundness. 12mo. Lond. 1854.
- Medical Examinations and Physicians’ Requirements considered. 8vo. Lond. 1857.
