= Herbert Mayo =

British physiologist, anatomist and medical writer

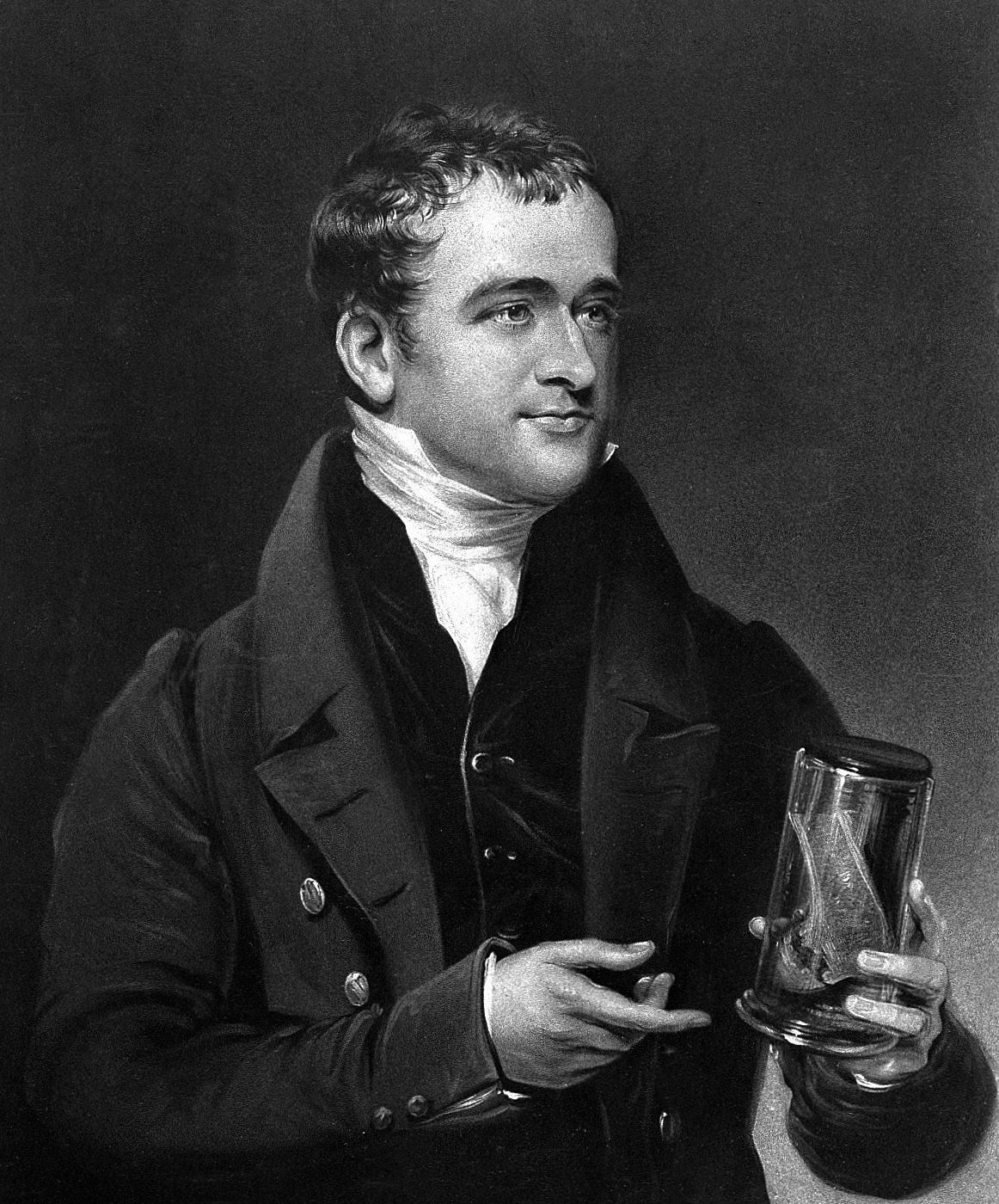
- Herbert Mayo c. 1830
- Born: 3 April 1796; London, United Kingdom
- Died: 15 May 1852 (aged 56); Bad Weilbach, Germany
- Occupation: Physician
- Known for: Medical writings

Herbert Mayo, M.D. (3 April 1796 – 28 June 1852), was a British physiologist, anatomist and medical writer.

== Biography ==
Mayo was born in Queen Anne Street, London, the third son of John Mayo. He entered Middlesex Hospital as a surgical pupil on 17 May 1814, and was a pupil of Sir Charles Bell (1812–15). He also studied at the Leyden University, where he graduated with a D.M. degree. He became house-surgeon at Middlesex Hospital in 1818, and M.R.C.S. in 1819.

In August 1822, the first part of the Anatomical and Physiological Commentaries appeared, a work containing Mayo's assertion of his discovery of the real function of the nerves of the face, and his account of the experiments which proved it. This was the starting point of a bitter and prolonged controversy with Sir Charles Bell, the discoverer of the distinction between sensory and motor nerves. Dr. Whewell, in a letter to the London Medical Gazette dated 11 December 1837, describes the discovery as having been made by Bell, Mayo, and Majendie, the two latter physiologists having corrected and completed the researches of the former. His claim was elaborated by Dr. Druitt:

Mayo was the first in enunciating the positive doctrine that the portio dura is the nerve of voluntary motion for the face, and the fifth nerve, the nerve of common sensation to the same. It is true there are certain passages in Sir Charles Bell's treatise in 1821 which make it difficult to conceive how he could have missed the truth, whilst there are other passages which show positively that he did miss it. Meanwhile Mayo's statement and claim in 1822 were clear, precise, and unmistakable

While lecturer on anatomy in the Medical School, Great Windmill Street, Mayo published, on 1 January 1827, the first edition of Outlines of Human Physiology based on lectures delivered at that school. He was surgeon of the Middlesex Hospital from 1827 until 1842, professor of anatomy and surgery to Royal College of Surgeons 1828 and 1829, F.R.S. 1828, F.G.S. 1832, and his name appears in the first list of fellows of the Royal College of Surgeons in 1843. On the establishment of King's College London in 1830 he received the appointment of professor of anatomy, and he became professor of physiology and pathological anatomy in 1836. He resided at 19 George Street, Hanover Square.

Mayo's ill-judged and unsuccessful candidature in 1836 for a vacant professorship at University College necessitated his withdrawal from King's College. He thereupon founded the Medical School at the Middlesex Hospital, which has since attained great practical reputation. In 1843 gradually increasing rheumatic gout reduced him to a state of helplessness, and compelled his retirement from his duties as lecturer on surgery at the Middlesex Hospital, after six years' tenure of the post. Finding relief in Germany from hydropathic treatment, he became physician in a hydropathic establishment at Boppart, and afterwards at Bad Weilbach, where he died 15 May 1852. In the later years of his life he had thrown himself into the hands of the mesmerists, and his work on the Truths contained in Popular Superstitions is an ably written exposition of his views regarding the supposed cause of mesmeric and kindred phenomena. He married Jessica Matilda, daughter of Samuel James Arnold, the dramatist, and had one son and two daughters with her.

== Writings ==
- Anatomical and Physiological Commentaries, 1822–3.
- Course of Dissections for Students, 1825.
- Outlines of Human Physiology, four editions, 1827–1837.
- A Series of Engravings of Brain and Spinal Cord in Man, 1827.
- Observations on Injuries and Diseases of the Rectum, 1833.
- Outlines of Human Pathology, 1836.
- Management of Organs of Digestion, 1837 and 1840.
- Powers of the Roots of the Nerves in Health and in Disease, 1837.
- Philosophy of Living, 1837 and 1851.
- Treatise on Syphilis, 1840.
- Nervous System and its Functions, 1842.
- The Cold Water Cure, 1845.
- Letters on Truths in Popular Superstitions, 1848 and 1851.
